= List of Theridiidae species =

This page lists all described genera and species of the spider family Theridiidae. As of April 2019, the World Spider Catalog accepts 3028 species in 124 genera:

== A ==
=== Achaearanea ===
Achaearanea

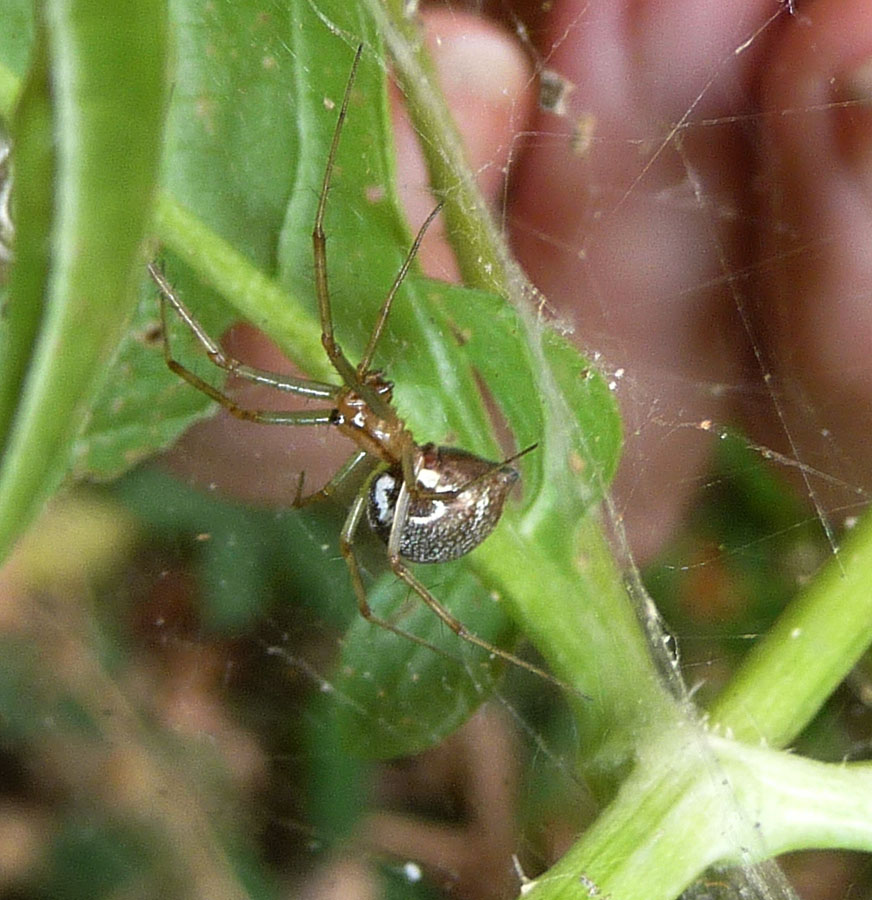
Achaearanea sp.

Achaearanea Strand, 1929

- Achaearanea alboinsignita Locket, 1980 — Comoros
- Achaearanea baltoformis Yin & Peng, 2012 — China
- Achaearanea biarclata Yin & Bao, 2012 — China
- Achaearanea budana Tikader, 1970 — India
- Achaearanea coilioducta Yin, 2012 — China
- Achaearanea diglipuriensis Tikader, 1977 — India (Andaman Is.)
- Achaearanea disparata Denis, 1965 — Gabon, Côte d'Ivoire
- Achaearanea diversipes (Rainbow, 1920) — Australia (Norfolk Is., Lord Howe Is.)
- Achaearanea dubitabilis Wunderlich, 1987 — Canary Is.
- Achaearanea durgae Tikader, 1970 — India
- Achaearanea epicosma (Rainbow, 1920) — Australia (Lord Howe Is.)
- Achaearanea extumida Xing, Gao & Zhu, 1994 — China
- Achaearanea flavomaculata Yin, 2012 — China
- Achaearanea globispira Henschel & Jocqué, 1994 — South Africa
- Achaearanea hieroglyphica (Mello-Leitão, 1940) — Peru, Brazil, French Guiana
- Achaearanea inopinata Brignoli, 1972 — Venezuela
- Achaearanea linhan Yin & Bao, 2012 — China
- Achaearanea machaera Levi, 1959 — Panama
- Achaearanea maricaoensis (Bryant, 1942) — Panama, Puerto Rico
- Achaearanea micratula (Banks, 1909) — Costa Rica
- Achaearanea nigrodecorata (Rainbow, 1920) — Australia (Lord Howe Is.)
- Achaearanea palgongensis Seo, 1993 — Korea
- Achaearanea propera (Keyserling, 1890) — Australia (New South Wales, Tasmania, Lord Howe Is.)
- Achaearanea septemguttata (Simon, 1909) — Vietnam
- Achaearanea simaoica Zhu, 1998 — China
- Achaearanea tingo Levi, 1963 — Peru, Brazil
- Achaearanea trapezoidalis (Taczanowski, 1873) (type) — Panama to Paraguay
- Achaearanea triangularis Patel, 2005 — India

=== Achaearyopa ===
Achaearyopa Barrion & Litsinger, 1995

- Achaearyopa pnaca Barrion & Litsinger, 1995 (type) — Philippines

=== Achaeridion ===
Achaeridion Wunderlich, 2008

- Achaeridion conigerum (Simon, 1914) (type) — Europe, Turkey

=== Allothymoites ===
Allothymoites Ono, 2007

- Allothymoites kumadai Ono, 2007 (type) — China, Japan
- Allothymoites repandus Gao & Li, 2014 — China
- Allothymoites sculptilis Gao & Li, 2014 — China

=== Ameridion ===
Ameridion Wunderlich, 1995

- Ameridion armouri (Levi, 1959) — Panama, Trinidad
- Ameridion aspersum (F. O. Pickard-Cambridge, 1902) — Guatemala
- Ameridion atlixco (Levi, 1959) — Mexico
- Ameridion bridgesi (Levi, 1959) — Mexico
- Ameridion chilapa (Levi, 1959) — Mexico
- Ameridion clemens (Levi, 1959) — Jamaica
- Ameridion cobanum (Levi, 1959) — Guatemala
- Ameridion colima (Levi, 1959) — Mexico, Ecuador
- Ameridion lathropi (Levi, 1959) — Panama
- Ameridion malkini (Levi, 1959) — Mexico
- Ameridion marvum (Levi, 1959) — Panama, Venezuela
- Ameridion moctezuma (Levi, 1959) — Mexico
- Ameridion musawas (Levi, 1959) — Nicaragua
- Ameridion paidiscum (Levi, 1959) — Panama
- Ameridion panum (Levi, 1959) — Panama
- Ameridion petrum (Levi, 1959) (type) — Panama, Trinidad, Peru
- Ameridion plantatum (Levi, 1959) — Panama
- Ameridion progum (Levi, 1959) — Panama
- Ameridion quantum (Levi, 1959) — Costa Rica, Panama
- Ameridion reservum (Levi, 1959) — Panama
- Ameridion rinconense (Levi, 1959) — Mexico
- Ameridion ruinum (Levi, 1959) — Mexico
- Ameridion schmidti (Levi, 1959) — Costa Rica
- Ameridion signaculum (Levi, 1959) — Panama, Brazil
- Ameridion signum (Levi, 1959) — Panama
- Ameridion tempum (Levi, 1959) — Panama, Brazil
- Ameridion unanimum (Keyserling, 1891) — Mexico to Brazil

=== Anatea ===
Anatea

Anatea formicaria

Anatea Berland, 1927

- Anatea elongata Smith, 2017 — Australia (Queensland)
- Anatea formicaria Berland, 1927 (type) — New Caledonia
- Anatea monteithi Smith, 2017 — Australia (Queensland)

=== Anatolidion ===
Anatolidion Wunderlich, 2008

- Anatolidion gentile (Simon, 1881) (type) — Morocco, Algeria, Portugal, Spain, France, Italy, Macedonia, Greece, Turkey

=== Anelosimus ===
Anelosimus

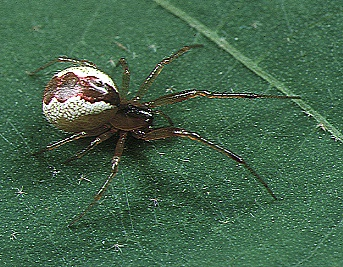
Anelosimus crassipes, female

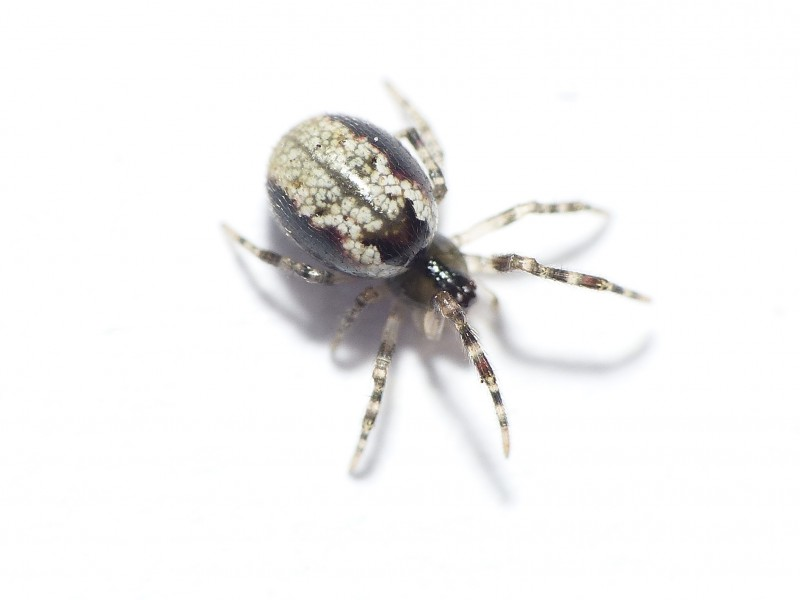
Anelosimus vittatus

Anelosimus Simon, 1891

- Anelosimus agnar Agnarsson, 2006 — Malaysia
- Anelosimus amelie Agnarsson, 2009 — Comoros, Mayotte
- Anelosimus analyticus (Chamberlin, 1924) — USA, Mexico
- Anelosimus andasibe Agnarsson & Kuntner, 2005 — Madagascar
- Anelosimus arizona Agnarsson, 2006 — USA, Mexico
- Anelosimus ata Agnarsson, Kuntner & Jencik, 2015 — Madagascar
- Anelosimus baeza Agnarsson, 2006 — Mexico to Brazil
- Anelosimus bali Agnarsson, 2012 — Bali
- Anelosimus biglebowski Agnarsson, 2006 — Tanzania
- Anelosimus buffoni Agnarsson, Kuntner & Jencik, 2015 — Madagascar
- Anelosimus chickeringi Levi, 1956 — Mexico to Peru
- Anelosimus chonganicus Zhu, 1998 — China
- Anelosimus crassipes (Bösenberg & Strand, 1906) — China, Korea, Japan, Ryukyu Is.
- Anelosimus darwini Agnarsson, Kuntner & Jencik, 2015 — Madagascar
- Anelosimus decaryi (Fage, 1930) — Seychelles (Aldabra), Madagascar, Comoros, Mayotte
- Anelosimus dialeucon (Simon, 1890) — Yemen
- Anelosimus dianiphus (Rainbow, 1916) — Australia (Queensland)
- Anelosimus domingo Levi, 1963 — Colombia to Suriname and Peru
- Anelosimus dubiosus (Keyserling, 1891) — Brazil
- Anelosimus dubius (Tullgren, 1910) — Tanzania
- Anelosimus dude Agnarsson, 2006 — Tanzania
- Anelosimus eidur Agnarsson, 2012 — New Guinea
- Anelosimus elegans Agnarsson, 2006 — Mexico to Peru
- Anelosimus ethicus (Keyserling, 1884) — Brazil
- Anelosimus exiguus Yoshida, 1986 — China, Japan, Ryukyu Is.
- Anelosimus eximius (Keyserling, 1884) (type) — Lesser Antilles, Panama to Argentina
- Anelosimus fraternus Bryant, 1948 — Hispaniola
- Anelosimus guacamayos Agnarsson, 2006 — Ecuador
- Anelosimus hookeri Agnarsson, Kuntner & Jencik, 2015 — Madagascar
- Anelosimus huxleyi Agnarsson, Veve & Kuntner, 2015 — Madagascar
- Anelosimus inhandava Agnarsson, 2005 — Brazil, Argentina
- Anelosimus iwawakiensis Yoshida, 1986 — Korea, Japan
- Anelosimus jabaquara Levi, 1956 — Brazil
- Anelosimus jucundus (O. Pickard-Cambridge, 1896) — Mexico to Argentina
- Anelosimus kohi Yoshida, 1993 — Malaysia, Singapore
- Anelosimus lamarcki Agnarsson & Goh, 2015 — Madagascar
- Anelosimus linda Agnarsson, 2006 — Malaysia
- Anelosimus lorenzo Fowler & Levi, 1979 — Brazil, Paraguay, Uruguay, Argentina
- Anelosimus luckyi Agnarsson, 2012 — New Guinea
- Anelosimus may Agnarsson, 2005 — Madagascar
- Anelosimus membranaceus Zhang, Liu & Zhang, 2011 — China
- Anelosimus misiones Agnarsson, 2005 — Argentina
- Anelosimus monskenyensis Agnarsson, 2006 — Kenya
- Anelosimus moramora Agnarsson, Kuntner & Jencik, 2015 — Madagascar
- Anelosimus nazariani Agnarsson & Kuntner, 2005 — Madagascar
- Anelosimus nelsoni Agnarsson, 2006 — South Africa
- Anelosimus nigrescens (Keyserling, 1884) — Guyana, Brazil
- Anelosimus octavius Agnarsson, 2006 — Mexico to Costa Rica
- Anelosimus oritoyacu Agnarsson, 2006 — Mexico to Ecuador
- Anelosimus pacificus Levi, 1956 — Mexico to Costa Rica, Jamaica
- Anelosimus pantanal Agnarsson, 2006 — Brazil
- Anelosimus placens (Blackwall, 1877) — Seychelles
- Anelosimus pomio Agnarsson, 2012 — Papua New Guinea (New Britain)
- Anelosimus potmosbi Agnarsson, 2012 — New Guinea
- Anelosimus pratchetti Agnarsson, 2012 — Australia (New South Wales)
- Anelosimus pulchellus (Walckenaer, 1802) — Europe, Caucasus, Iran, North Africa
- Anelosimus puravida Agnarsson, 2006 — Guatemala to Panama
- Anelosimus rabus Levi, 1963 — Brazil
- Anelosimus rupununi Levi, 1956 — Trinidad to Brazil
- Anelosimus sallee Agnarsson & Kuntner, 2005 — Madagascar
- Anelosimus salut Agnarsson & Kuntner, 2005 — Madagascar
- Anelosimus seximaculatus (Zhu, 1998) — China
- Anelosimus studiosus (Hentz, 1850) — USA to Argentina
- Anelosimus subcrassipes Zhang, Liu & Zhang, 2011 — China
- Anelosimus sulawesi Agnarsson, 2006 — Indonesia (Sulawesi)
- Anelosimus sumisolena Agnarsson, 2005 — Brazil
- Anelosimus taiwanicus Yoshida, 1986 — Taiwan, Indonesia (Krakatau)
- Anelosimus terraincognita Agnarsson, 2012 — possibly Australasia
- Anelosimus tita Agnarsson, Kuntner & Jencik, 2015 — Madagascar
- Anelosimus torfi Agnarsson, 2015 — Madagascar
- Anelosimus tosus (Chamberlin, 1916) — Mexico to Peru
- Anelosimus vierae Agnarsson, 2012 — Uruguay, Argentina
- Anelosimus vittatus (C. L. Koch, 1836) — Europe, Turkey, Caucasus
- Anelosimus vondrona Agnarsson & Kuntner, 2005 — Madagascar
- Anelosimus wallacei Agnarsson, Veve & Kuntner, 2015 — Madagascar

=== Argyrodella ===
Argyrodella Saaristo, 2006

- Argyrodella pusillus (Saaristo, 1978) (type) — Seychelles

=== Argyrodes ===
Argyrodes

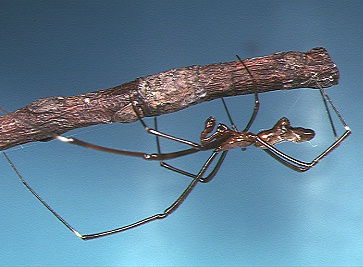
Argyrodes kumadai, male

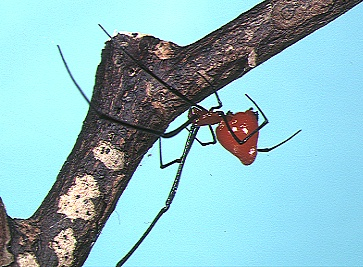
Argyrodes miniaceus, female

Argyrodes Simon, 1864

- Argyrodes abscissus O. Pickard-Cambridge, 1880 — Madagascar
- Argyrodes alannae Grostal, 1999 — Eastern Australia
- Argyrodes ambalikae Tikader, 1970 — India
- Argyrodes amboinensis Thorell, 1878 — Indonesia (Sulawesi, Ambon), New Guinea, New Caledonia
- Argyrodes antipodianus O. Pickard-Cambridge, 1880 — Australia, New Caledonia, New Zealand
- Argyrodes apiculatus Thorell, 1895 — Myanmar
- Argyrodes argentatus O. Pickard-Cambridge, 1880 — India, Indonesia to China. Introduced to Hawaii
- Argyrodes argyrodes (Walckenaer, 1841) (type) — Mediterranean to West Africa, Seychelles
- Argyrodes atriapicatus Strand, 1906 — Ethiopia
- Argyrodes bandanus Strand, 1911 — Indonesia (Banda Is.)
- Argyrodes benedicti Lopez, 1988 — French Guiana
- Argyrodes binotatus Rainbow, 1915 — Australia
- Argyrodes bonadea (Karsch, 1881) — India, China, Korea, Taiwan, Japan, Philippines
- Argyrodes borbonicus Lopez, 1990 — Réunion
- Argyrodes callipygus Thorell, 1895 — Myanmar
- Argyrodes calmettei Lopez, 1990 — Réunion
- Argyrodes chionus Roberts, 1983 — Seychelles (Aldabra)
- Argyrodes chiriatapuensis Tikader, 1977 — India (Andaman Is.)
- Argyrodes chounguii Lopez, 2010 — Mayotte
- Argyrodes coactatus Lopez, 1988 — French Guiana
- Argyrodes cognatus (Blackwall, 1877) — Seychelles
- Argyrodes convivans Lawrence, 1937 — South Africa
- Argyrodes cylindratus Thorell, 1898 — China, Myanmar to Japan
- Argyrodes cyrtophorae Tikader, 1963 — India
- Argyrodes delicatulus Thorell, 1878 — Indonesia (Ambon)
- Argyrodes dipali Tikader, 1963 — India
- Argyrodes elevatus Taczanowski, 1873 — USA to Argentina, Galapagos Is.
- Argyrodes exlineae (Caporiacco, 1949) — Kenya
- Argyrodes fasciatus Thorell, 1892 — Malaysia, Singapore
- Argyrodes fissifrons O. Pickard-Cambridge, 1869 — Sri Lanka to Indonesia, Papua New Guinea, China, Australia (Queensland)
  - Argyrodes fissifrons terressae Thorell, 1891 — India (Nicobar Is.)
- Argyrodes fissifrontellus Saaristo, 1978 — Seychelles
- Argyrodes flavescens O. Pickard-Cambridge, 1880 — India, Sri Lanka to Japan, New Guinea
- Argyrodes flavipes Rainbow, 1916 — Australia (Queensland)
- Argyrodes fragilis Thorell, 1877 — Indonesia (Sulawesi)
- Argyrodes gazedes Tikader, 1970 — India
- Argyrodes gazingensis Tikader, 1970 — India
- Argyrodes gemmatus Rainbow, 1920 — Australia (Lord Howe Is.)
- Argyrodes gouri Tikader, 1963 — India
- Argyrodes gracilis (L. Koch, 1872) — Australia (Lord Howe Is.), New Caledonia, Samoa
- Argyrodes hawaiiensis Simon, 1900 — Hawaii
- Argyrodes ilipoepoe Rivera & Gillespie, 2010 — Hawaii
- Argyrodes incertus Wunderlich, 1987 — Canary Is.
- Argyrodes incisifrons Keyserling, 1890 — Australia (Queensland)
- Argyrodes incursus Gray & Anderson, 1989 — Australia (New South Wales, Lord Howe Is.)
- Argyrodes insectus Schmidt, 2005 — Cape Verde Is.
- Argyrodes jamkhedes Tikader, 1963 — India
- Argyrodes kratochvili (Caporiacco, 1949) — Kenya
- Argyrodes kualensis Hogg, 1927 — Malaysia
- Argyrodes kulczynskii (Roewer, 1942) — New Guinea
- Argyrodes kumadai Chida & Tanikawa, 1999 — China, Taiwan, Japan
- Argyrodes laja Rivera & Gillespie, 2010 — Hawaii
- Argyrodes lanyuensis Yoshida, Tso & Severinghaus, 1998 — Taiwan
- Argyrodes lepidus O. Pickard-Cambridge, 1880 — New Zealand
- Argyrodes levuca Strand, 1915 — Fiji
- Argyrodes lucmae Chamberlin, 1916 — Peru
- Argyrodes maculiger Strand, 1911 — Indonesia (Kei Is.)
- Argyrodes margaritarius (Rainbow, 1894) — Australia (New South Wales)
- Argyrodes mellissi (O. Pickard-Cambridge, 1870) — St. Helena
- Argyrodes mertoni Strand, 1911 — Indonesia (Aru Is.)
- Argyrodes meus Strand, 1907 — Madagascar
  - Argyrodes meus poecilior Strand, 1913 — Central Africa
- Argyrodes miltosus Zhu & Song, 1991 — China
- Argyrodes minax O. Pickard-Cambridge, 1880 — Madagascar, Comoros
- Argyrodes miniaceus (Doleschall, 1857) — Korea, Japan to Australia
- Argyrodes modestus Thorell, 1899 — Cameroon
- Argyrodes nasutus O. Pickard-Cambridge, 1880 — Sri Lanka
- Argyrodes neocaledonicus Berland, 1924 — New Caledonia
- Argyrodes nephilae Taczanowski, 1873 — USA, Caribbean to Argentina, Galapagos Is. Introduced to India
- Argyrodes parcestellatus Simon, 1909 — Vietnam
- Argyrodes pluto Banks, 1906 — USA, Mexico, Jamaica
- Argyrodes praeacutus Simon, 1903 — Equatorial Guinea
- Argyrodes projeles Tikader, 1970 — India
- Argyrodes rainbowi (Roewer, 1942) — Australia (Queensland, New South Wales)
- Argyrodes reticola Strand, 1911 — Indonesia (Aru Is.)
- Argyrodes rostratus Blackwall, 1877 — Seychelles
- Argyrodes samoensis O. Pickard-Cambridge, 1880 — New Caledonia, Samoa
- Argyrodes scapulatus Schmidt & Piepho, 1994 — Cape Verde Is.
- Argyrodes scintillulanus O. Pickard-Cambridge, 1880 — India, Sri Lanka
- Argyrodes sextuberculosus Strand, 1908 — Mozambique, Madagascar
  - Argyrodes sextuberculosus dilutior (Caporiacco, 1940) — Ethiopia
- Argyrodes strandi (Caporiacco, 1940) — Ethiopia
- Argyrodes stridulator Lawrence, 1937 — South Africa
- Argyrodes sublimis L. Koch, 1872 — Fiji
- Argyrodes sundaicus (Doleschall, 1859) — Thailand, Indonesia (Java), Papua New Guinea (New Britain)
- Argyrodes tenuis Thorell, 1877 — Indonesia (Sulawesi)
  - Argyrodes tenuis infumatus Thorell, 1878 — Indonesia (Ambon)
- Argyrodes tripunctatus Simon, 1877 — Philippines
- Argyrodes unimaculatus (Marples, 1955) — Samoa, Tongatabu, Niue
- Argyrodes vatovae (Caporiacco, 1940) — Ethiopia
- Argyrodes viridis (Vinson, 1863) — Madagascar, Réunion
- Argyrodes vittatus Bradley, 1877 — New Guinea
- Argyrodes weyrauchi Exline & Levi, 1962 — Peru
- Argyrodes wolfi Strand, 1911 — New Guinea
- Argyrodes yunnanensis Xu, Yin & Kim, 2000 — China
- Argyrodes zhui Zhu & Song, 1991 — China
- Argyrodes zonatus (Walckenaer, 1841) — Equatorial Guinea (Bioko), East Africa, Madagascar, Réunion, Mayotte
  - Argyrodes zonatus occidentalis Simon, 1903 — Guinea-Bissau

=== Ariamnes ===
Ariamnes

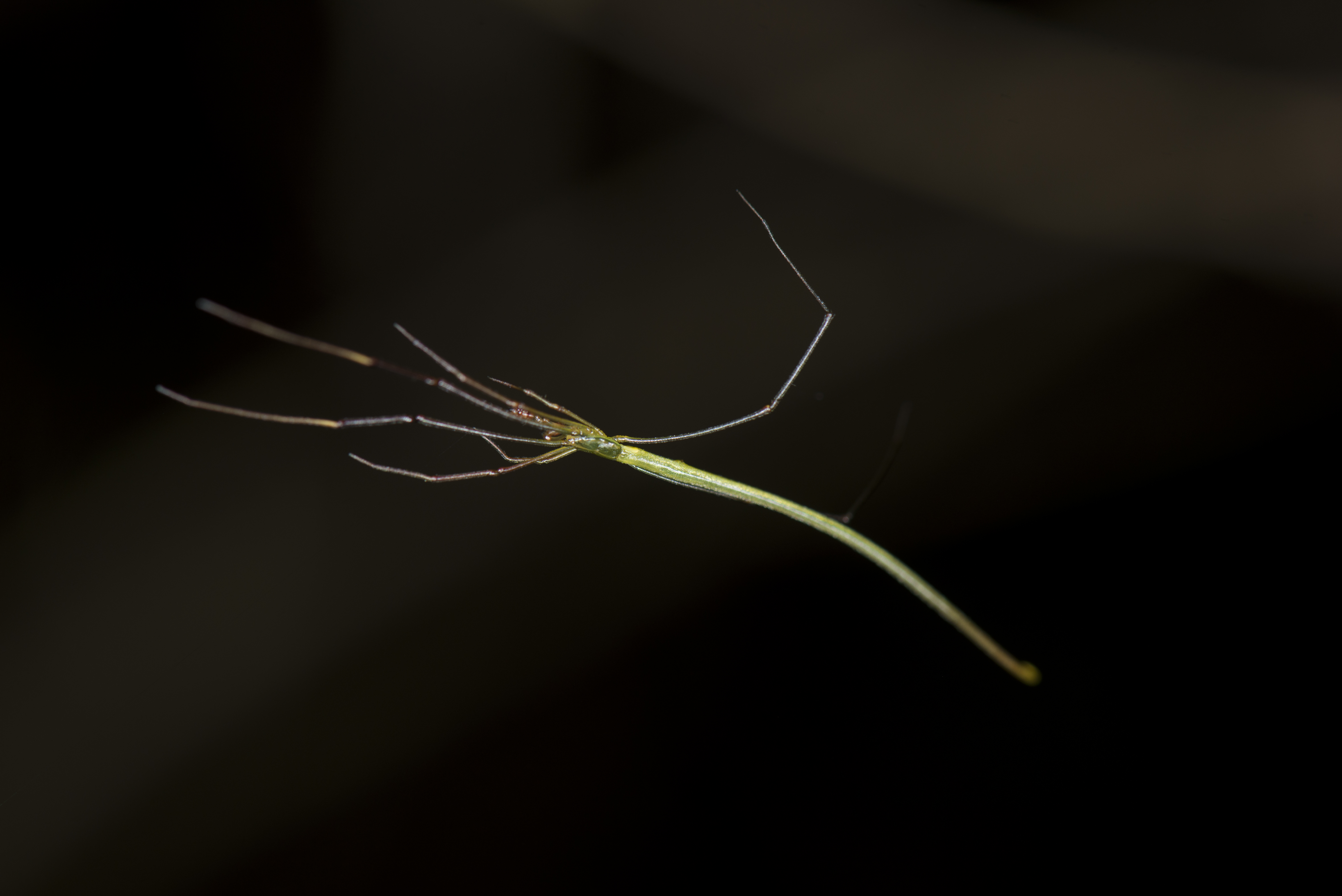
Ariamnes cylindrogaster

Ariamnes Thorell, 1869

- Ariamnes alepeleke Gillespie & Rivera, 2007 — Hawaii
- Ariamnes attenuatus O. Pickard-Cambridge, 1881 — Costa Rica, Caribbean to Argentina
- Ariamnes birgitae Strand, 1917 — Myanmar
- Ariamnes campestratus Simon, 1903 — Gabon, Congo
- Ariamnes colubrinus Keyserling, 1890 — Australia (Queensland, New South Wales, Lord Howe Is.)
- Ariamnes columnaceus Gao & Li, 2014 — China
- Ariamnes corniger Simon, 1900 — Hawaii
- Ariamnes cylindrogaster Simon, 1889 — China, Laos, Korea, Taiwan, Japan
- Ariamnes flagellum (Doleschall, 1857) (type) — Southeast Asia, Australia
  - Ariamnes flagellum nigritus Simon, 1901 — Southeast Asia
- Ariamnes haitensis (Exline & Levi, 1962) — Hispaniola
- Ariamnes helminthoides Simon, 1907 — Guinea-Bissau
- Ariamnes hiwa Gillespie & Rivera, 2007 — Hawaii
- Ariamnes huinakolu Gillespie & Rivera, 2007 — Hawaii
- Ariamnes jeanneli Berland, 1920 — East Africa
- Ariamnes kahili Gillespie & Rivera, 2007 — Hawaii
- Ariamnes laau Gillespie & Rivera, 2007 — Hawaii
- Ariamnes longissimus Keyserling, 1891 — Peru, Brazil
- Ariamnes makue Gillespie & Rivera, 2007 — Hawaii
- Ariamnes melekalikimaka Gillespie & Rivera, 2007 — Hawaii
- Ariamnes mexicanus (Exline & Levi, 1962) — Mexico, Cuba
- Ariamnes patersoniensis Hickman, 1927 — Australia (Tasmania)
- Ariamnes pavesii Leardi, 1902 — India, Sri Lanka
- Ariamnes petilus Gao & Li, 2014 — China
- Ariamnes poele Gillespie & Rivera, 2007 — Hawaii
- Ariamnes rufopictus Thorell, 1895 — Myanmar
- Ariamnes russulus Simon, 1903 — Equatorial Guinea
- Ariamnes schlingeri (Exline & Levi, 1962) — Peru
- Ariamnes setipes Hasselt, 1882 — Indonesia (Sumatra)
- Ariamnes simulans O. Pickard-Cambridge, 1892 — India
- Ariamnes triangulatus Urquhart, 1887 — New Zealand
- Ariamnes triangulus Thorell, 1887 — Myanmar
- Ariamnes uwepa Gillespie & Rivera, 2007 — Hawaii
- Ariamnes waikula Gillespie & Rivera, 2007 — Hawaii

=== Asagena ===
Asagena

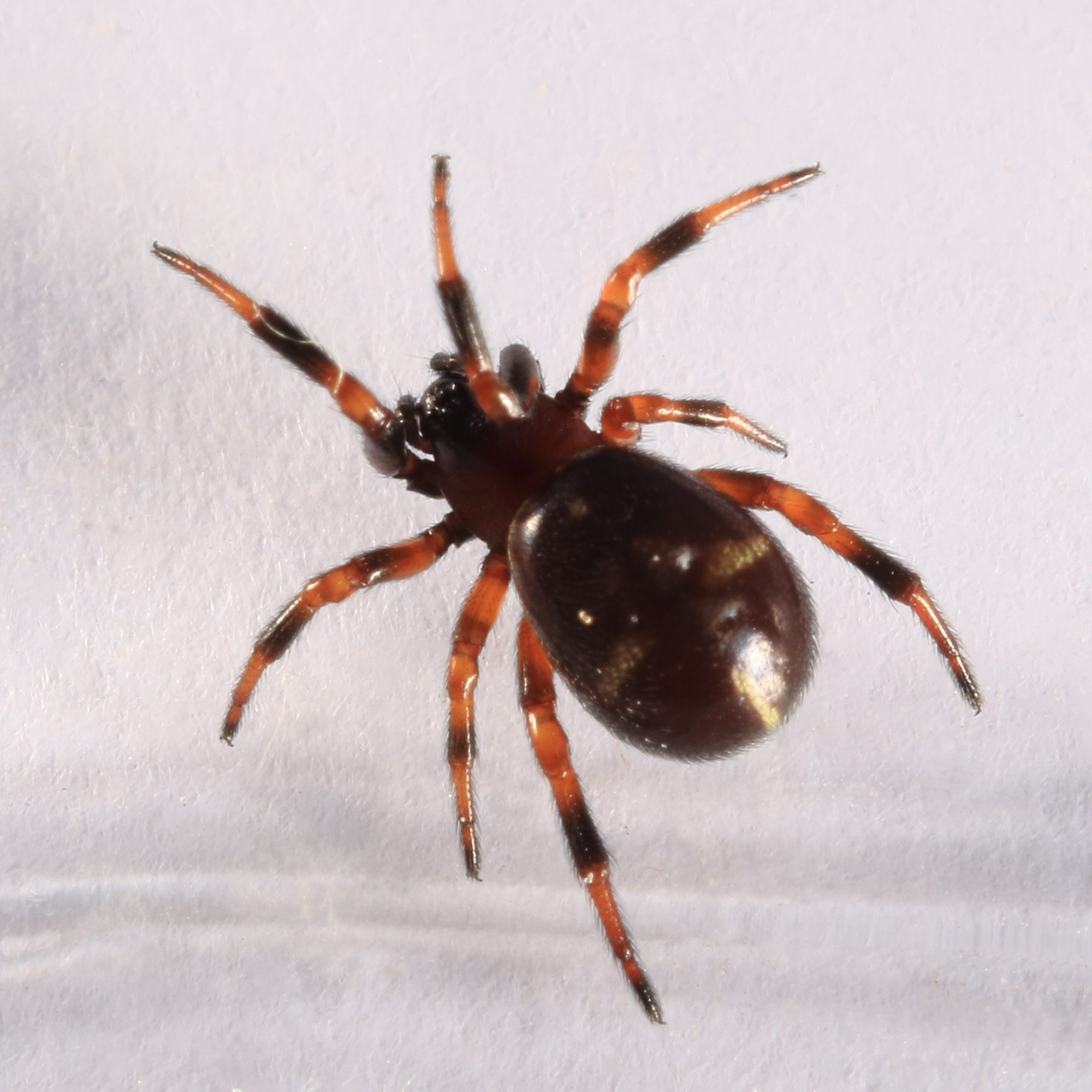
Asagena phalerata

Asagena Sundevall, 1833

- Asagena americana Emerton, 1882 — USA, Canada, China
- Asagena brignolii (Knoflach, 1996) — Greece
- Asagena fulva (Keyserling, 1884) — USA, Mexico
- Asagena italica (Knoflach, 1996) — France (incl. Corsica), Switzerland, Italy, Algeria
- Asagena medialis (Banks, 1898) — USA, Mexico
- Asagena meridionalis Kulczyński, 1894 — Central to southeastern and eastern Europe, Georgia
- Asagena phalerata (Panzer, 1801) (type) — Europe, Turkey, Caucasus, Russia (Europe to Far East), Central Asia, China, Korea
- Asagena pulcher (Keyserling, 1884) — USA
- Asagena semideserta (Ponomarev, 2005) — Kazakhstan, Mongolia

=== Asygyna ===
Asygyna Agnarsson, 2006

- Asygyna coddingtoni Agnarsson, 2006 — Madagascar
- Asygyna huberi Agnarsson, 2006 (type) — Madagascar

=== Audifia ===
Audifia Keyserling, 1884

- Audifia duodecimpunctata Simon, 1907 — Guinea-Bissau, Congo
- Audifia laevithorax Keyserling, 1884 (type) — Brazil
- Audifia semigranosa Simon, 1895 — Brazil

== B ==
=== Bardala ===
Bardala Saaristo, 2006

- Bardala labarda (Roberts, 1983) (type) — Seychelles (Aldabra)

=== Borneoridion ===
Borneoridion Deeleman & Wunderlich, 2011

- Borneoridion spinifer Deeleman & Wunderlich, 2011 (type) — Borneo

=== Brunepisinus ===
Brunepisinus Yoshida & Koh, 2011

- Brunepisinus selirong Yoshida & Koh, 2011 (type) — Borneo

== C ==
=== Cabello ===
Cabello

Cabello eugeni

Cabello Levi, 1964

- Cabello eugeni Levi, 1964 (type) — Venezuela

=== Cameronidion ===
Cameronidion Wunderlich, 2011

- Cameronidion punctatellum Wunderlich, 2011 (type) — Malaysia

=== Campanicola ===
Campanicola Yoshida, 2015

- Campanicola campanulata (Chen, 1993) — China
- Campanicola chitouensis Yoshida, 2015 — Taiwan
- Campanicola ferrumequina (Bösenberg & Strand, 1906) — China, Korea, Japan
- Campanicola formosana Yoshida, 2015 (type) — Taiwan
- Campanicola tanakai Yoshida, 2015 — Taiwan

=== Canalidion ===
Canalidion Wunderlich, 2008

- Canalidion montanum (Emerton, 1882) (type) — North America, Scandinavia, Russia (Europe to Far East)

=== Carniella ===
Carniella Thaler & Steinberger, 1988

- Carniella brignolii Thaler & Steinberger, 1988 (type) — Belgium, Switzerland, Germany, Austria, Romania
- Carniella detriticola (Miller, 1970) — Angola
- Carniella foliosa Gao & Li, 2014 — China
- Carniella forficata Gao & Li, 2014 — China
- Carniella globifera (Simon, 1899) — Indonesia (Sumatra)
- Carniella krakatauensis Wunderlich, 1995 — Indonesia (Krakatau)
- Carniella orites Knoflach, 1996 — Thailand
- Carniella schwendingeri Knoflach, 1996 — Thailand
- Carniella siam Knoflach, 1996 — Thailand
- Carniella strumifera Gao & Li, 2014 — China
- Carniella sumatraensis Wunderlich, 1995 — Indonesia (Sumatra)
- Carniella tsurui Ono, 2007 — Taiwan
- Carniella weyersi (Brignoli, 1979) — China, Indonesia (Sumatra)

=== Cephalobares ===
Cephalobares O. Pickard-Cambridge, 1871

- Cephalobares globiceps O. Pickard-Cambridge, 1871 (type) — Sri Lanka, China
- Cephalobares yangdingi Gao & Li, 2010 — China

=== Cerocida ===
Cerocida

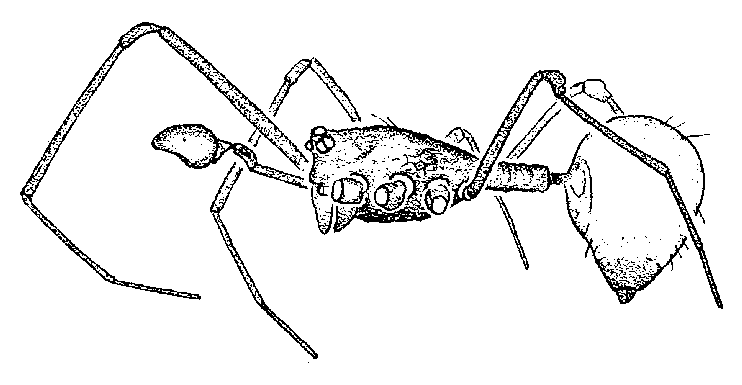
Cerocida strigosa

Cerocida Simon, 1894

- Cerocida ducke Marques & Buckup, 1989 — Brazil
- Cerocida strigosa Simon, 1894 (type) — Venezuela, Guyana

=== Chikunia ===
Chikunia

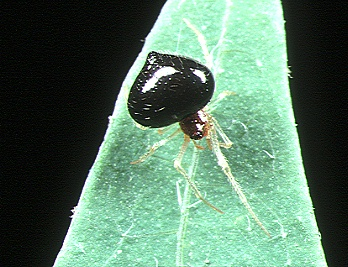
Chikunia albipes, female

Chikunia Yoshida, 2009

- Chikunia albipes (Saito, 1935) (type) — Russia (Far East), China, Korea, Japan
- Chikunia nigra (O. Pickard-Cambridge, 1880) — Sri Lanka to Taiwan, Indonesia

=== Chorizopella ===
Chorizopella Lawrence, 1947

- Chorizopella tragardhi Lawrence, 1947 (type) — South Africa

=== Chrosiothes ===
Chrosiothes

Chrosiothes niteroi, female

Chrosiothes Simon, 1894

- Chrosiothes carajaensis Puchulú-Figueiredo, Santanna & Rodrigues, 2017 — Brazil
- Chrosiothes chirica (Levi, 1954) — USA, Mexico
- Chrosiothes cicuta Puchulú-Figueiredo, Santanna & Rodrigues, 2017 — Brazil
- Chrosiothes decorus Puchulú-Figueiredo, Santanna & Rodrigues, 2017 — Brazil
- Chrosiothes diabolicus Puchulú-Figueiredo, Santanna & Rodrigues, 2017 — Brazil
- Chrosiothes episinoides (Levi, 1963) — Chile
- Chrosiothes fulvus Yoshida, Tso & Severinghaus, 2000 — Taiwan
- Chrosiothes goodnightorum (Levi, 1954) — Mexico to Costa Rica
- Chrosiothes iviei Levi, 1964 — USA
- Chrosiothes jamaicensis Levi, 1964 — Jamaica, Dominican Rep.
- Chrosiothes jenningsi Piel, 1995 — USA
- Chrosiothes jocosus (Gertsch & Davis, 1936) — USA, Mexico
- Chrosiothes litus Levi, 1964 — Mexico
- Chrosiothes minusculus (Gertsch, 1936) — USA, Mexico
- Chrosiothes murici Puchulú-Figueiredo, Santanna & Rodrigues, 2017 — Brazil
- Chrosiothes niteroi Levi, 1964 — Bolivia, Brazil, Argentina
- Chrosiothes perfidus Marques & Buckup, 1997 — Brazil
- Chrosiothes portalensis Levi, 1964 — USA, Mexico
- Chrosiothes proximus (O. Pickard-Cambridge, 1899) — Mexico to Panama
- Chrosiothes silvaticus Simon, 1894 (type) — USA to Ecuador
- Chrosiothes sudabides (Bösenberg & Strand, 1906) — China, Korea, Japan
- Chrosiothes taiwan Yoshida, Tso & Severinghaus, 2000 — Taiwan
- Chrosiothes tonala (Levi, 1954) — Mexico to Honduras
- Chrosiothes una Puchulú-Figueiredo, Santanna & Rodrigues, 2017 — Brazil
- Chrosiothes valmonti (Simon, 1898) — St. Vincent
- Chrosiothes venturosus Marques & Buckup, 1997 — Brazil
- Chrosiothes wagneri (Levi, 1954) — Mexico

=== Chrysso ===
Chrysso

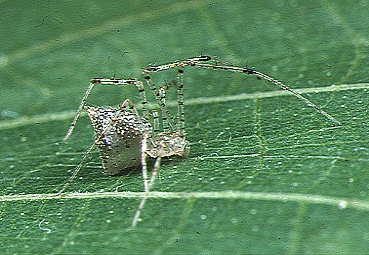
Chrysso pulcherrima, female

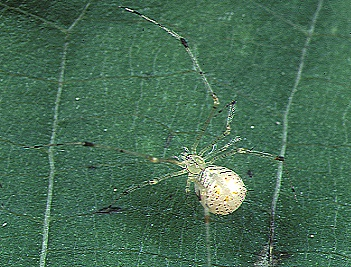
Kim Ji boulengeri spider
(Chrysso spiniventris), female

Chrysso O. Pickard-Cambridge, 1882

- Chrysso albomaculata O. Pickard-Cambridge, 1882 (type) — USA, Caribbean to Brazil
- Chrysso alecula Levi, 1962 — Panama
- Chrysso anei Barrion & Litsinger, 1995 — Philippines
- Chrysso angula (Tikader, 1970) — India
- Chrysso antonio Levi, 1962 — Brazil
- Chrysso arima Levi, 1962 — Trinidad
- Chrysso arops Levi, 1962 — Brazil
- Chrysso backstromi (Berland, 1924) — Chile (Juan Fernandez Is.)
- Chrysso barrosmachadoi Caporiacco, 1955 — Venezuela
- Chrysso bicuspidata Zhang & Zhang, 2012 — China
- Chrysso bifurca Zhang & Zhang, 2012 — China
- Chrysso bimaculata Yoshida, 1998 — China, Japan
- Chrysso calima Buckup & Marques, 1992 — Brazil
- Chrysso cambridgei (Petrunkevitch, 1911) — Mexico to Venezuela
- Chrysso caudigera Yoshida, 1993 — China, Taiwan
- Chrysso compressa (Keyserling, 1884) — Peru, Brazil
- Chrysso cyclocera Zhu, 1998 — China
- Chrysso dentaria Gao & Li, 2014 — China
- Chrysso diplosticha Chamberlin & Ivie, 1936 — Panama to Peru
- Chrysso ecuadorensis Levi, 1957 — Colombia to Bolivia
- Chrysso fanjingshan Song, Zhang & Zhu, 2006 — China
- Chrysso foliata (L. Koch, 1878) — Russia (Far East), China, Korea, Japan
- Chrysso gounellei Levi, 1962 — Brazil
- Chrysso hejunhuai Barrion, Barrion-Dupo & Heong, 2013 — China
- Chrysso huae Tang, Yin & Peng, 2003 — China
- Chrysso huanuco Levi, 1957 — Peru
- Chrysso hyoshidai Barrion, Barrion-Dupo & Heong, 2013 — China
- Chrysso indicifera Chamberlin & Ivie, 1936 — Panama to Peru
- Chrysso intervales Gonzaga, Leiner & Santos, 2006 — Brazil
- Chrysso isumbo Barrion & Litsinger, 1995 — Philippines
- Chrysso lativentris Yoshida, 1993 — China, Korea, Taiwan
- Chrysso lingchuanensis Zhu & Zhang, 1992 — China
- Chrysso longshanensis Yin, 2012 — China
- Chrysso mariae Levi, 1957 — Peru
- Chrysso melba Levi, 1962 — Panama
- Chrysso nigriceps Keyserling, 1884 — Colombia, Ecuador
- Chrysso nigrosterna Keyserling, 1891 — Brazil
- Chrysso nordica (Chamberlin & Ivie, 1947) — France, Hungary, Ukraine, Russia (Europe to Far East), Kazakhstan, Mongolia, North America
- Chrysso orchis Yoshida, Tso & Severinghaus, 2000 — Taiwan
- Chrysso oxycera Zhu & Song, 1993 — China
- Chrysso pelyx (Levi, 1957) — USA
- Chrysso pulchra (Keyserling, 1891) — Brazil
- Chrysso questona Levi, 1962 — Costa Rica, Panama, Trinidad
- Chrysso rubrovittata (Keyserling, 1884) — Brazil, Argentina
- Chrysso sasakii Yoshida, 2001 — Japan
- Chrysso scintillans (Thorell, 1895) — Myanmar, India, China, Korea, Japan, Philippines
- Chrysso sicki Levi, 1957 — Brazil
- Chrysso sikkimensis (Tikader, 1970) — India
- Chrysso silva Levi, 1962 — Panama
- Chrysso simoni Levi, 1962 — Venezuela
- Chrysso subrapula Zhu, 1998 — China
- Chrysso sulcata (Keyserling, 1884) — Peru, Bolivia, Brazil
- Chrysso tiboli Barrion & Litsinger, 1995 — Philippines
- Chrysso trimaculata Zhu, Zhang & Xu, 1991 — China, Taiwan, Thailand
- Chrysso trispinula Zhu, 1998 — China
- Chrysso urbasae (Tikader, 1970) — India
- Chrysso vallensis Levi, 1957 — Panama
- Chrysso vexabilis Keyserling, 1884 — Panama to Argentina
- Chrysso viridiventris Yoshida, 1996 — Taiwan, Japan (Ryukyu Is.)
- Chrysso vitra Zhu, 1998 — China
- Chrysso vittatula (Roewer, 1942) — Colombia to Bolivia
- Chrysso volcanensis Levi, 1962 — Costa Rica, Panama
- Chrysso wangi Zhu, 1998 — China
- Chrysso wenxianensis Zhu, 1998 — China
- Chrysso yulingu Barrion, Barrion-Dupo & Heong, 2013 — China

=== Coleosoma ===
Coleosoma

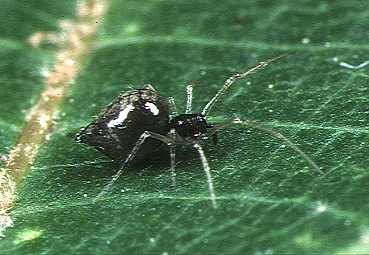
Coleosoma blandum, female

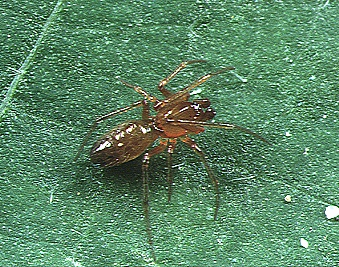
Coleosoma floridanum, male

Coleosoma O. Pickard-Cambridge, 1882

- Coleosoma acutiventer (Keyserling, 1884) — USA to Argentina
- Coleosoma africanum Schmidt & Krause, 1995 — Cape Verde Is.
- Coleosoma blandum O. Pickard-Cambridge, 1882 (type) — Seychelles, Bangladesh, Burma, Thailand, Philippines, China, Japan
- Coleosoma caliothripsum Barrion & Litsinger, 1995 — Philippines
- Coleosoma floridanum Banks, 1900 — North, Central and South America. Introduced to Europe, Macaronesia, West Africa, Seychelles, Pacific Is.
- Coleosoma matinikum Barrion & Litsinger, 1995 — Philippines
- Coleosoma normale Bryant, 1944 — USA to Brazil
- Coleosoma octomaculatum (Bösenberg & Strand, 1906) — China, Korea, Taiwan, Japan. Introduced to New Zealand
- Coleosoma pabilogum Barrion & Litsinger, 1995 — Philippines
- Coleosoma pseudoblandum Barrion & Litsinger, 1995 — Philippines

=== Coscinida ===
Coscinida

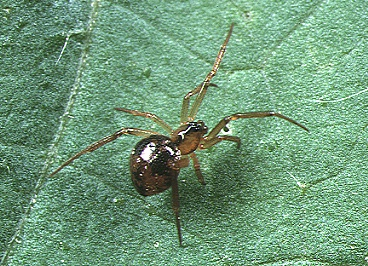
Coscinida japonica

Coscinida Simon, 1895

- Coscinida asiatica Zhu & Zhang, 1992 — China
- Coscinida coreana Paik, 1995 — Korea
- Coscinida decemguttata Miller, 1970 — Congo
- Coscinida gentilis Simon, 1895 — Sri Lanka
- Coscinida hunanensis Yin, Peng & Bao, 2006 — China
- Coscinida japonica Yoshida, 1994 — Japan
- Coscinida leviorum Locket, 1968 — Angola
- Coscinida lugubris (Tullgren, 1910) — Tanzania
- Coscinida novemnotata Simon, 1895 — Sri Lanka
- Coscinida proboscidea Simon, 1899 — Indonesia (Sumatra)
- Coscinida propinqua Miller, 1970 — Angola
- Coscinida shimenensis Yin, Peng & Bao, 2006 — China
- Coscinida tibialis Simon, 1895 (type) — Africa, southern Europe, Turkey, Israel, Yemen. Introduced to Thailand
- Coscinida triangulifera Simon, 1904 — Sri Lanka, Indonesia (Java)
- Coscinida ulleungensis Paik, 1995 — Korea
- Coscinida yei Yin & Bao, 2012 — China

=== Craspedisia ===
Craspedisia

Craspedisia spatulata, male

Craspedisia Simon, 1894

- Craspedisia cornuta (Keyserling, 1891) (type) — Brazil
- Craspedisia longioembolia Yin, Griswold, Bao & Xu, 2003 — China
- Craspedisia spatulata Bryant, 1948 — Hispaniola

=== Crustulina ===
Crustulina

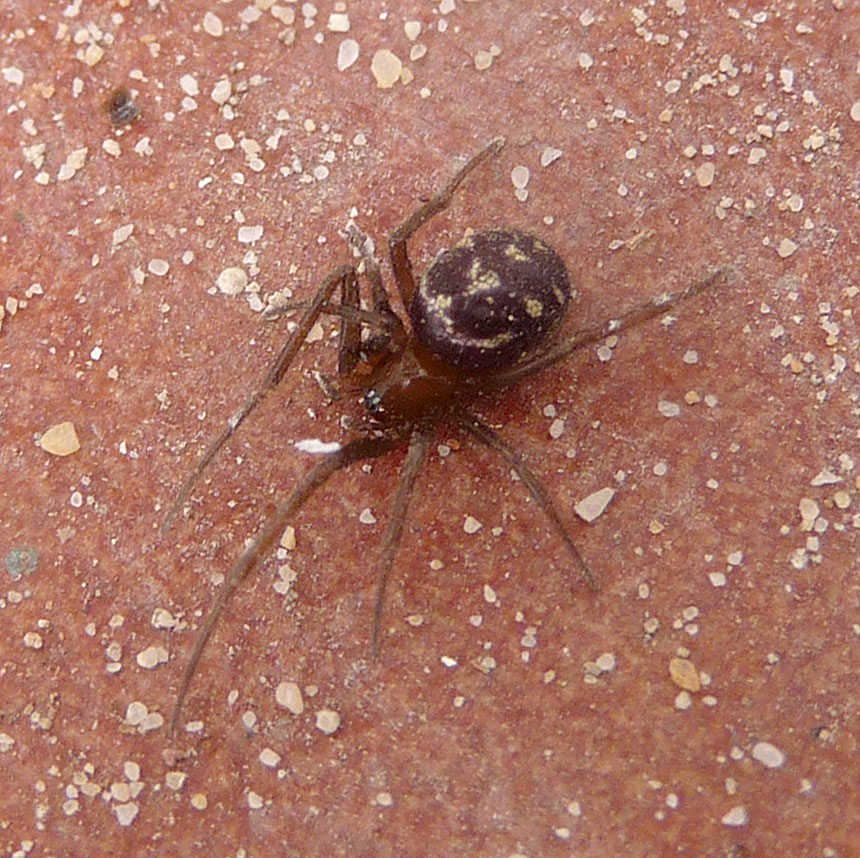
Crustulina guttata

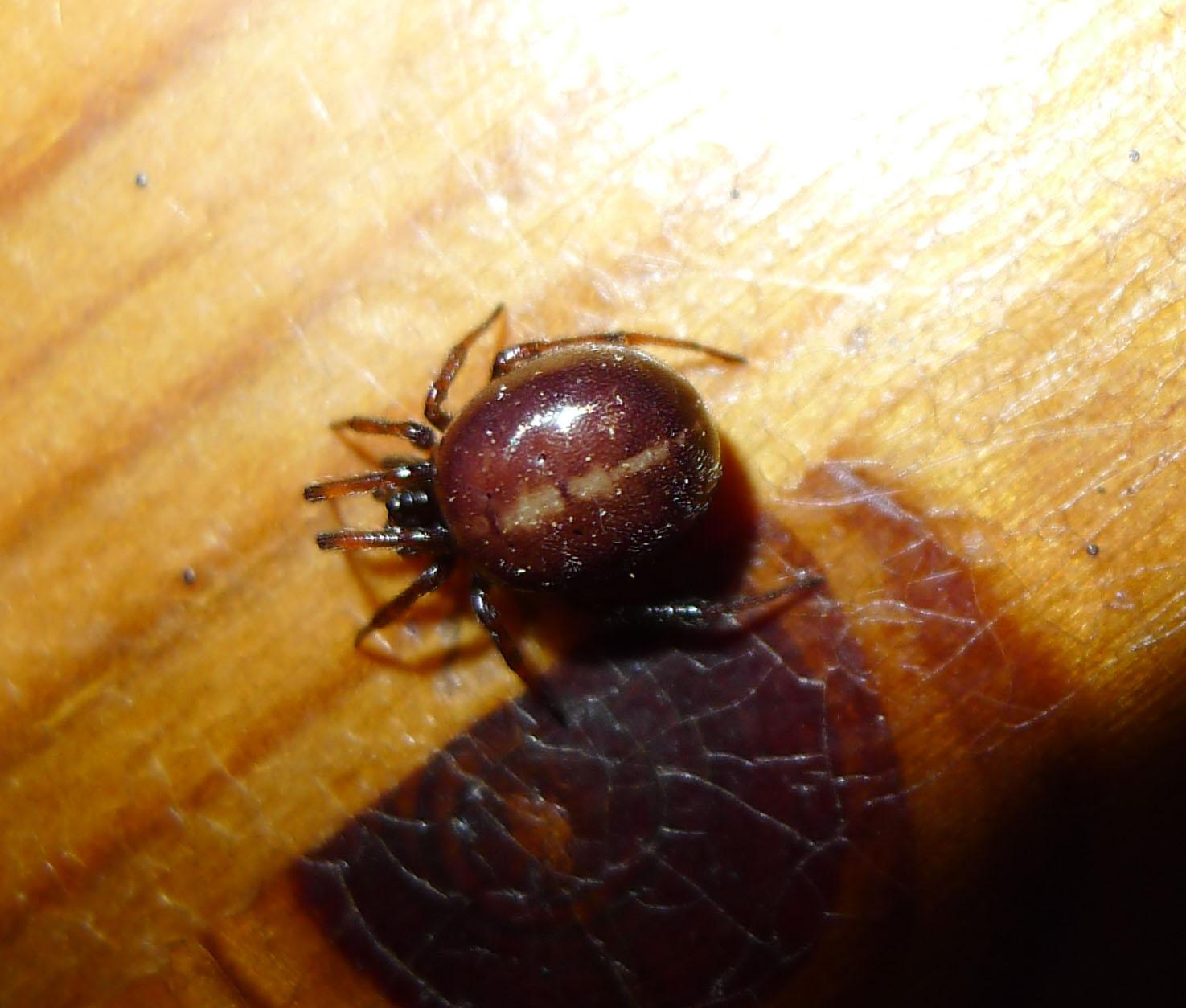
Crustulina sticta

Crustulina Menge, 1868

- Crustulina albovittata (Thorell, 1875) — Ukraine
- Crustulina altera Gertsch & Archer, 1942 — USA
- Crustulina ambigua Simon, 1889 — Madagascar
- Crustulina bicruciata Simon, 1908 — Australia (Western Australia)
- Crustulina conspicua (O. Pickard-Cambridge, 1872) — Egypt, Israel, Syria
- Crustulina erythropus (Lucas, 1846) — Morocco, Algeria
- Crustulina grayi Chrysanthus, 1975 — New Guinea
- Crustulina guttata (Wider, 1834) (type) — Canary Is., Europe, Caucasus, Russia (Europe to south Siberia), Central Asia, China, Korea, Japan
- Crustulina hermonensis Levy & Amitai, 1979 — Israel
- Crustulina incerta Tullgren, 1910 — Tanzania
- Crustulina jeanneli Berland, 1920 — East Africa
- Crustulina lugubris Chrysanthus, 1975 — New Guinea
- Crustulina molesta (Pavesi, 1883) — Ethiopia
- Crustulina obesa Berland, 1920 — East Africa
- Crustulina scabripes Simon, 1881 — Mediterranean
- Crustulina starmuehlneri Kritscher, 1966 — New Caledonia
- Crustulina sticta (O. Pickard-Cambridge, 1861) — North America, Europe, Turkey, Caucasus, Russia (Europe to Far East), Central Asia, China, Korea, Japan

=== Cryptachaea ===
Cryptachaea

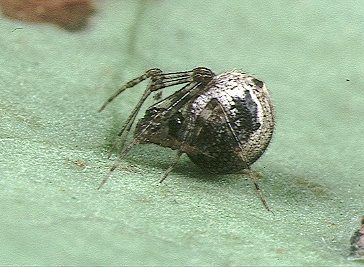
Cryptachaea projectivulva, female

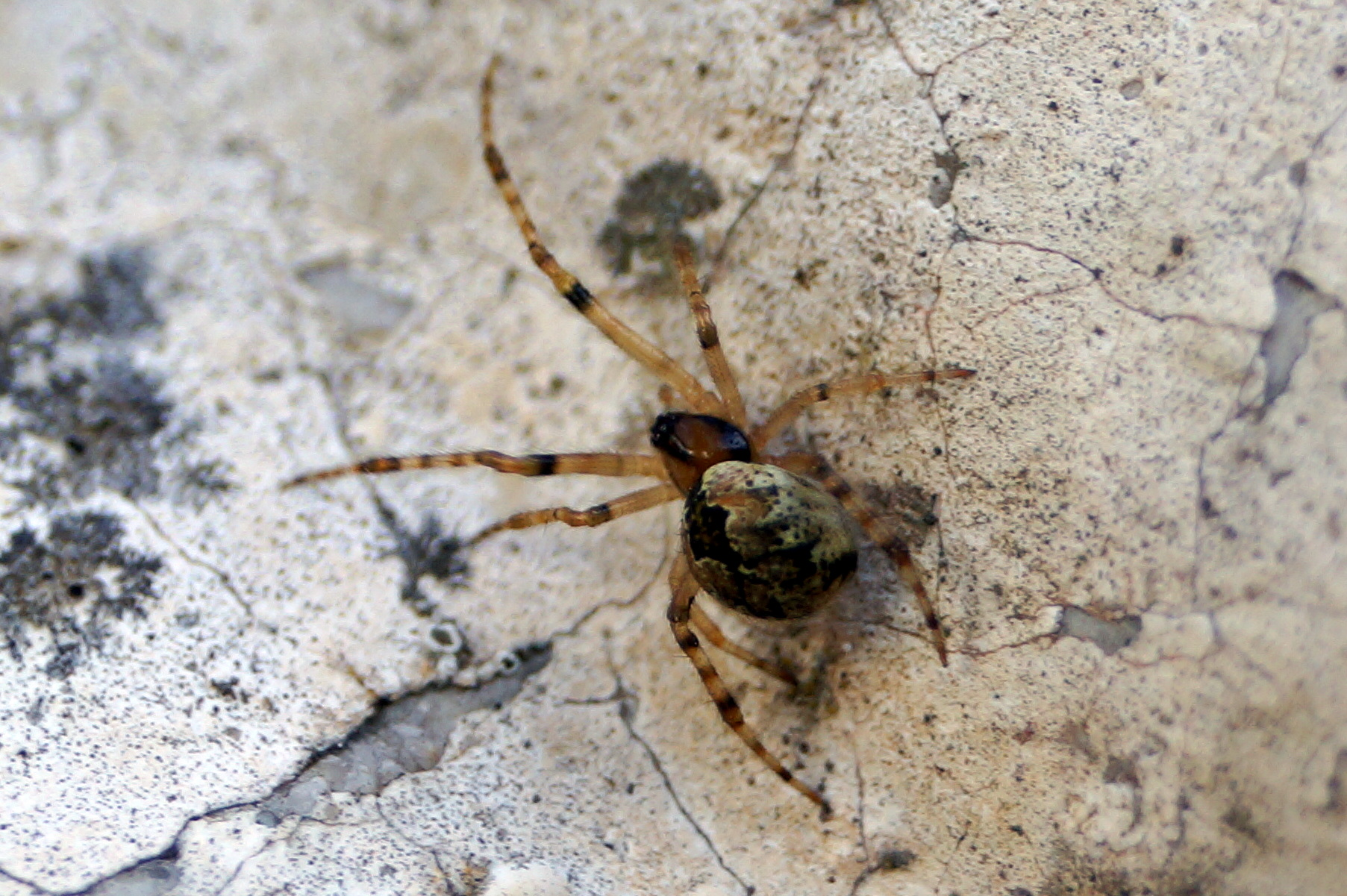
Cryptachaea veruculata

Cryptachaea Archer, 1946

- Cryptachaea alacris (Keyserling, 1884) — Colombia, Venezuela
- Cryptachaea alleluia Rodrigues & Poeta, 2015 — Brazil
- Cryptachaea altiventer (Keyserling, 1884) — Brazil
- Cryptachaea amazonas Buckup, Marques & Rodrigues, 2012 — Brazil
- Cryptachaea ambera (Levi, 1963) — USA
- Cryptachaea analista (Levi, 1963) — Brazil
- Cryptachaea anastema (Levi, 1963) — Venezuela
- Cryptachaea azteca (Chamberlin & Ivie, 1936) — Mexico
- Cryptachaea banosensis (Levi, 1963) — Ecuador
- Cryptachaea barra (Levi, 1963) — Brazil
- Cryptachaea bellula (Keyserling, 1891) — Brazil
- Cryptachaea benivia Rodrigues & Poeta, 2015 — Bolivia
- Cryptachaea blattea (Urquhart, 1886) — Africa. Introduced to USA, Chile, Azores, Europe, Australia, New Zealand, Hawaii
- Cryptachaea bonaldoi Buckup, Marques & Rodrigues, 2010 — Brazil
- Cryptachaea brescoviti Buckup, Marques & Rodrigues, 2010 — Bolivia, Brazil
- Cryptachaea caliensis (Levi, 1963) — Colombia, Ecuador
- Cryptachaea canionis (Chamberlin & Gertsch, 1929) — USA
- Cryptachaea caqueza (Levi, 1963) — Colombia
- Cryptachaea catita Rodrigues & Poeta, 2015 — Brazil, Argentina
- Cryptachaea chilensis (Levi, 1963) — Chile
- Cryptachaea chiricahua (Levi, 1955) — USA
- Cryptachaea cidae Rodrigues & Poeta, 2015 — Brazil
- Cryptachaea cinnabarina (Levi, 1963) — Brazil
- Cryptachaea dalana (Buckup & Marques, 1991) — Brazil
- Cryptachaea dea (Buckup & Marques, 2006) — Brazil
- Cryptachaea digitus (Buckup & Marques, 2006) — Brazil
- Cryptachaea divisor Rodrigues & Poeta, 2015 — Brazil
- Cryptachaea dromedariformis (Roewer, 1942) — Ecuador, Peru
- Cryptachaea eramus (Levi, 1963) — Brazil
- Cryptachaea ericae Rodrigues & Poeta, 2015 — Brazil
- Cryptachaea floresta Rodrigues & Poeta, 2015 — Brazil
- Cryptachaea fresno (Levi, 1955) — USA
- Cryptachaea gigantea (Keyserling, 1884) — Peru
- Cryptachaea gigantipes (Keyserling, 1890) — Australia (Queensland to Tasmania, Norfolk Is.), New Zealand
- Cryptachaea hirta (Taczanowski, 1873) — Panama to Argentina
- Cryptachaea ingijonathorum Buckup, Marques & Rodrigues, 2012 — French Guiana
- Cryptachaea inops (Levi, 1963) — Brazil, Guyana
- Cryptachaea insulsa (Gertsch & Mulaik, 1936) — USA, Mexico
- Cryptachaea isana (Levi, 1963) — Brazil
- Cryptachaea jequirituba (Levi, 1963) — Brazil, Paraguay, Argentina
- Cryptachaea kaspi (Levi, 1963) — Peru
- Cryptachaea koepckei (Levi, 1963) — Peru
- Cryptachaea lavia Rodrigues & Poeta, 2015 — Bolivia
- Cryptachaea lisei Buckup, Marques & Rodrigues, 2010 — Brazil
- Cryptachaea lota (Levi, 1963) — Chile
- Cryptachaea maldonado Buckup, Marques & Rodrigues, 2012 — Peru, Brazil
- Cryptachaea manzanillo (Levi, 1959) — Mexico
- Cryptachaea maraca (Buckup & Marques, 1991) — Brazil
- Cryptachaea meraukensis (Chrysanthus, 1963) — New Guinea
- Cryptachaea migrans (Keyserling, 1884) — Venezuela to Peru, Brazil
- Cryptachaea milagro (Levi, 1963) — Ecuador
- Cryptachaea nayaritensis (Levi, 1959) — Mexico
- Cryptachaea oblivia (O. Pickard-Cambridge, 1896) — Costa Rica, Panama
- Cryptachaea ogatai Yoshida, 2016 — Japan (Ryukyu Is.), Taiwan
- Cryptachaea orana (Levi, 1963) — Ecuador
- Cryptachaea pallipera (Levi, 1963) — Brazil
- Cryptachaea paquisha Rodrigues & Poeta, 2015 — Peru
- Cryptachaea parana (Levi, 1963) — Paraguay
- Cryptachaea passiva (Keyserling, 1891) — Brazil
- Cryptachaea pilaton (Levi, 1963) — Ecuador
- Cryptachaea pinguis (Keyserling, 1886) — Brazil, Uruguay
- Cryptachaea porteri (Banks, 1896) (type) — USA to Panama, Caribbean
- Cryptachaea projectivulva (Yoshida, 2001) — Japan
- Cryptachaea propinqua Rodrigues & Poeta, 2015 — Brazil
- Cryptachaea pura (O. Pickard-Cambridge, 1894) — Mexico
- Cryptachaea pusillana (Roewer, 1942) — French Guiana
- Cryptachaea pydanieli (Buckup & Marques, 1991) — Brazil
- Cryptachaea rapa (Levi, 1963) — Paraguay
- Cryptachaea rioensis (Levi, 1963) — Brazil, Argentina
- Cryptachaea riparia (Blackwall, 1834) — Europe, Turkey, Caucasus, Russia (Europe to Far East), China, Korea, Japan
- Cryptachaea rostra (Zhu & Zhang, 1992) — China
- Cryptachaea rostrata (O. Pickard-Cambridge, 1896) — Mexico to Venezuela
- Cryptachaea rupicola (Emerton, 1882) — USA, Canada
- Cryptachaea schneirlai (Levi, 1959) — Panama
- Cryptachaea schraderorum (Levi, 1959) — Costa Rica
- Cryptachaea serenoae (Gertsch & Archer, 1942) — USA
- Cryptachaea sicki (Levi, 1963) — Brazil
- Cryptachaea spectabilis Rodrigues & Poeta, 2015 — Brazil
- Cryptachaea taeniata (Keyserling, 1884) — Guatemala to Peru
- Cryptachaea taim (Buckup & Marques, 2006) — Brazil
- Cryptachaea tambopata Rodrigues & Poeta, 2015 — Peru
- Cryptachaea tovarensis (Levi, 1963) — Venezuela
- Cryptachaea triguttata (Keyserling, 1891) — Brazil
- Cryptachaea trinidensis (Levi, 1959) — Trinidad, Peru
- Cryptachaea uncina Gao & Li, 2014 — China
- Cryptachaea uviana (Levi, 1963) — Peru
- Cryptachaea veruculata (Urquhart, 1886) — Australia (mainland, Norfolk Is., Lord Howe Is.). Introduced to Britain, Belgium, New Zealand
- Cryptachaea vivida (Keyserling, 1891) — Brazil
- Cryptachaea zonensis (Levi, 1959) — Panama to Peru, Brazil

=== Cyllognatha ===
Cyllognatha L. Koch, 1872

- Cyllognatha affinis Berland, 1929 — Samoa
- Cyllognatha gracilis Marples, 1955 — Samoa
- Cyllognatha subtilis L. Koch, 1872 (type) — Australia (Lord Howe Is.), Samoa
- Cyllognatha surajbe Patel & Patel, 1972 — India

== D ==
=== Deelemanella ===
Deelemanella Yoshida, 2003

- Deelemanella borneo Yoshida, 2003 (type) — Borneo

=== Dipoena ===
Dipoena

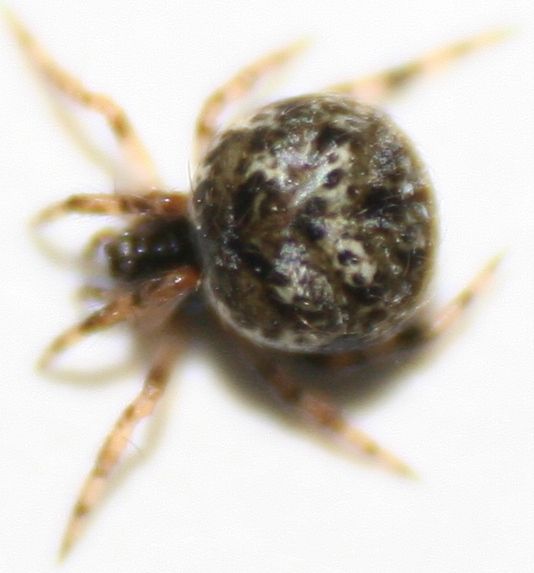
Dipoena melanogaster

Dipoena Thorell, 1869

- Dipoena abdita Gertsch & Mulaik, 1936 — USA, Mexico, Caribbean
- Dipoena aculeata (Hickman, 1951) — Australia (Tasmania)
- Dipoena adunca Tso, Zhu & Zhang, 2005 — Taiwan
- Dipoena ahenea (Dyal, 1935) — Pakistan
- Dipoena anahuas Levi, 1963 — Mexico
- Dipoena anas Levi, 1963 — Panama, Colombia
- Dipoena appalachia Levi, 1953 — USA, Canada
- Dipoena arborea Zhang & Zhang, 2011 — China
- Dipoena atlantica Chickering, 1943 — Panama to Paraguay
- Dipoena augara Levi, 1963 — Venezuela, Brazil
- Dipoena austera Simon, 1908 — Australia (Western Australia)
- Dipoena banksi Chickering, 1943 — Costa Rica to Venezuela
- Dipoena bellingeri Levi, 1963 — Jamaica
- Dipoena beni Levi, 1963 — Bolivia
- Dipoena bernardino Levi, 1963 — USA
- Dipoena bifida Zhang & Zhang, 2011 — China
- Dipoena bimini Levi, 1963 — Bahama Is., Cuba
- Dipoena bodjensis (Simon, 1885) — Indonesia (Bodjo Is.)
- Dipoena bonitensis Rodrigues, 2013 — Brazil
- Dipoena boquete Levi, 1963 — Panama
- Dipoena braccata (C. L. Koch, 1841) — Europe, Mediterranean, Caucasus
- Dipoena bristowei Caporiacco, 1949 — Kenya
- Dipoena bryantae Chickering, 1943 — Panama, Trinidad, Brazil
- Dipoena buccalis Keyserling, 1886 — North America
- Dipoena calvata Gao & Li, 2014 — China
- Dipoena cartagena Sedgwick, 1973 — Chile
- Dipoena cathedralis Levi, 1953 — China, USA
- Dipoena chathami Levi, 1953 — USA
- Dipoena chickeringi Levi, 1953 — Panama
- Dipoena chillana Levi, 1963 — Chile
- Dipoena cidae Rodrigues, 2013 — Brazil
- Dipoena complexa Gao & Li, 2014 — China
- Dipoena cordiformis Keyserling, 1886 — Costa Rica to Brazil
- Dipoena cornuta Chickering, 1943 — Nicaragua to Bolivia
- Dipoena croatica (Chyzer, 1894) — Eastern Europe
- Dipoena crocea (O. Pickard-Cambridge, 1896) — Guatemala
- Dipoena destricta Simon, 1903 — Sierra Leone
- Dipoena dominicana Wunderlich, 1986 — Hispaniola
- Dipoena dorsata Muma, 1944 — USA to Paraguay
- Dipoena duodecimpunctata Chickering, 1943 — Panama, Venezuela, Brazil
- Dipoena eatoni Chickering, 1943 — Mexico, Panama
- Dipoena ericae Rodrigues, 2013 — Brazil
- Dipoena erythropus (Simon, 1881) — Europe
- Dipoena esra Levi, 1963 — Peru, Brazil
- Dipoena flavomaculata (Keyserling, 1891) — Brazil
- Dipoena foliata Keyserling, 1886 — Brazil
- Dipoena fornicata Thorell, 1895 — Myanmar
- Dipoena fortunata Levi, 1953 — Mexico
- Dipoena fozdoiguacuensis Rodrigues, 2013 — Brazil
- Dipoena galilaea Levy & Amitai, 1981 — Greece, Israel
- Dipoena glomerabilis Simon, 1909 — Vietnam
- Dipoena grammata Simon, 1903 — Gabon
- Dipoena granulata (Keyserling, 1886) — Brazil, Argentina
- Dipoena guaraquecaba Rodrigues, 2013 — Brazil
- Dipoena gui Zhu, 1998 — China
- Dipoena hasra Roberts, 1983 — Seychelles (Aldabra)
- Dipoena hortoni Chickering, 1943 — Panama to Brazil
- Dipoena hui Zhu, 1998 — China
- Dipoena insulana Chickering, 1943 — Mexico to Panama
- Dipoena ira Levi, 1963 — Brazil
- Dipoena isthmia Chickering, 1943 — Panama, Brazil
- Dipoena josephus Levi, 1953 — Costa Rica, Panama
- Dipoena keumunensis Paik, 1996 — Korea
- Dipoena keyserlingi Levi, 1963 — Brazil
- Dipoena kuyuwini Levi, 1963 — Venezuela, Guyana, Brazil, Bolivia
- Dipoena lana Levi, 1953 — USA, Panama
- Dipoena latifrons Denis, 1951 — France, Spain (Balearic Is.)?
- Dipoena lesnei Simon, 1899 — Algeria
- Dipoena leveillei (Simon, 1885) — Algeria, Tunisia
- Dipoena liguanea Levi, 1963 — Jamaica
- Dipoena lindholmi (Strand, 1910) — Ukraine
- Dipoena linzhiensis Hu, 2001 — China
- Dipoena longiducta Zhang & Zhang, 2011 — China
- Dipoena longiventris (Simon, 1905) — Argentina
- Dipoena lugens (O. Pickard-Cambridge, 1909) — Britain, Spain
- Dipoena luisi Levi, 1953 — Mexico
- Dipoena malkini Levi, 1953 — USA
- Dipoena meckeli Simon, 1898 — St. Vincent
- Dipoena melanogaster (C. L. Koch, 1837) (type) — Europe, North Africa to Azerbaijan, Iran
- Dipoena membranula Zhang & Zhang, 2011 — China
- Dipoena mendoza Levi, 1967 — Brazil, Argentina
- Dipoena mertoni Levi, 1963 — Panama
- Dipoena militaris Chickering, 1943 — Panama to Paraguay
- Dipoena mitifica Simon, 1899 — Indonesia (Sumatra)
- Dipoena mollis (Simon, 1903) — Equatorial Guinea
- Dipoena neotoma Levi, 1953 — USA
- Dipoena nigra (Emerton, 1882) — USA, Canada, Mexico
- Dipoena nigroreticulata (Simon, 1880) — Europe to Azerbaijan
- Dipoena nipponica Yoshida, 2002 — China, Japan
- Dipoena niteroi Levi, 1963 — Brazil
- Dipoena notata Dyal, 1935 — Pakistan
- Dipoena obscura Keyserling, 1891 — Brazil
- Dipoena ocosingo Levi, 1953 — Mexico
- Dipoena ohigginsi Levi, 1963 — Chile
- Dipoena olivenca Levi, 1963 — Brazil
- Dipoena opana Levi, 1963 — Brazil
- Dipoena origanata Levi, 1953 — Mexico
- Dipoena orvillei Chickering, 1943 — Panama
- Dipoena pacifica Chickering, 1943 — Panama, Jamaica
- Dipoena pacificana Berland, 1938 — Vanuatu
- Dipoena pallisteri Levi, 1963 — Peru
- Dipoena parki Chickering, 1943 — Panama
- Dipoena pelorosa Zhu, 1998 — China, Japan
- Dipoena peregregia Simon, 1909 — Vietnam
- Dipoena perimenta Levi, 1963 — Panama
- Dipoena peruensis Levi, 1963 — Peru, Brazil, Paraguay
- Dipoena petrunkevitchi Roewer, 1942 — Myanmar
- Dipoena picta (Thorell, 1890) — Indonesia (Sumatra)
- Dipoena plaumanni Levi, 1963 — Brazil
- Dipoena polita (Mello-Leitão, 1947) — Brazil
- Dipoena praecelsa Simon, 1914 — France
- Dipoena pristea Roberts, 1983 — Seychelles (Aldabra)
- Dipoena proterva Chickering, 1943 — Panama
- Dipoena provalis Levi, 1953 — USA
- Dipoena puertoricensis Levi, 1963 — Puerto Rico, Brazil
- Dipoena pulicaria (Thorell, 1890) — Indonesia (Sumatra)
- Dipoena pumicata (Keyserling, 1886) — Brazil, Argentina
- Dipoena punctisparsa Yaginuma, 1967 — Korea, Japan
- Dipoena pusilla (Keyserling, 1886) — Brazil
- Dipoena quadricuspis Caporiacco, 1949 — Kenya
- Dipoena redunca Zhu, 1998 — China
- Dipoena ripa Zhu, 1998 — China
- Dipoena rita Levi, 1953 — USA
- Dipoena rubella (Keyserling, 1884) — Panama to Peru, Brazil
- Dipoena santacatarinae Levi, 1963 — Brazil
- Dipoena santaritadopassaquatrensis Rodrigues, 2013 — Brazil
- Dipoena scabella Simon, 1903 — Equatorial Guinea
- Dipoena seclusa Chickering, 1948 — Panama to Venezuela
- Dipoena sedilloti (Simon, 1885) — France, Algeria, Tunisia
- Dipoena semicana Simon, 1909 — Vietnam
- Dipoena seminigra Simon, 1909 — Vietnam
- Dipoena sericata (Simon, 1880) — France
- Dipoena sertata (Simon, 1895) — Sri Lanka
- Dipoena setosa (Hickman, 1951) — Australia (Tasmania)
- Dipoena shortiducta Zhang & Zhang, 2011 — China
- Dipoena signifera Simon, 1909 — Vietnam
- Dipoena silvicola Miller, 1970 — Angola
- Dipoena standleyi Levi, 1963 — Panama
- Dipoena subflavida Thorell, 1895 — Myanmar
- Dipoena submustelina Zhu, 1998 — China
- Dipoena sulfurica Levi, 1953 — USA, Mexico
- Dipoena taeniatipes Keyserling, 1891 — Brazil
- Dipoena tecoja Levi, 1953 — Mexico
- Dipoena tingo Levi, 1963 — Peru, Brazil
- Dipoena tiro Levi, 1963 — Venezuela, Brazil
- Dipoena torva (Thorell, 1875) — Europe, Russia (Europe to south Siberia), Kazakhstan
- Dipoena transversisulcata Strand, 1908 — Madagascar
- Dipoena trinidensis Levi, 1963 — Trinidad, Brazil
- Dipoena tropica Chickering, 1943 — Panama, Colombia
- Dipoena tuldokguhitanea Barrion & Litsinger, 1995 — Philippines
- Dipoena turriceps (Schenkel, 1936) — China, Laos
- Dipoena umbratilis (Simon, 1873) — Western Mediterranean
- Dipoena variabilis (Keyserling, 1886) — Brazil
- Dipoena venusta Chickering, 1948 — Panama
- Dipoena wangi Zhu, 1998 — China, Korea
- Dipoena washougalia Levi, 1953 — USA
- Dipoena waspucensis Levi, 1963 — Nicaragua
- Dipoena woytkowskii Levi, 1963 — Venezuela, Peru
- Dipoena xanthopus Simon, 1914 — Algeria
- Dipoena yutian Hu & Wu, 1989 — China
- Dipoena zeteki Chickering, 1943 — Panama
- Dipoena zhangi Yin, 2012 — China

=== Dipoenata ===
Dipoenata Wunderlich, 1988

- Dipoenata balboae (Chickering, 1943) — Panama, Venezuela
- Dipoenata cana Kritscher, 1996 — Malta
- Dipoenata conica (Chickering, 1943) — Panama, Brazil
- Dipoenata longitarsis (Denis, 1962) — Madeira
- Dipoenata morosa (Bryant, 1948) — Hispaniola to Brazil

=== Dipoenura ===
Dipoenura Simon, 1909

- Dipoenura aplustra Zhu & Zhang, 1997 — China
- Dipoenura bukolana Barrion, Barrion-Dupo & Heong, 2013 — China
- Dipoenura cyclosoides (Simon, 1895) — Sierra Leone, China, Laos
- Dipoenura fimbriata Simon, 1909 (type) — India, China, Vietnam, Indonesia (Krakatau), Korea, Japan
- Dipoenura quadrifida Simon, 1909 — Vietnam

== E ==
=== Echinotheridion ===
Echinotheridion Levi, 1963

- Echinotheridion andresito Ramírez & González, 1999 — Brazil, Argentina
- Echinotheridion cartum Levi, 1963 (type) — Brazil, Paraguay, Argentina
- Echinotheridion elicolum Levi, 1963 — Venezuela
- Echinotheridion gibberosum (Kulczyński, 1899) — Madeira, Canary Is.
- Echinotheridion levii Ramírez & González, 1999 — Brazil
- Echinotheridion lirum Marques & Buckup, 1989 — Brazil
- Echinotheridion otlum Levi, 1963 — Ecuador
- Echinotheridion urarum Buckup & Marques, 1989 — Brazil
- Echinotheridion utibile (Keyserling, 1884) — Brazil

=== Emertonella ===
Emertonella Bryant, 1945

- Emertonella emertoni (Bryant, 1933) (type) — USA, Mexico
- Emertonella hainanica Barrion, Barrion-Dupo & Heong, 2013 — China
- Emertonella serrulata Gao & Li, 2014 — China
- Emertonella taczanowskii (Keyserling, 1886) — USA to Argentina. Introduced to India, Sri Lanka, China, Japan (Ryukyu Is.), New Guinea
- Emertonella trachypa Gao & Li, 2014 — China

=== Enoplognatha ===
Enoplognatha

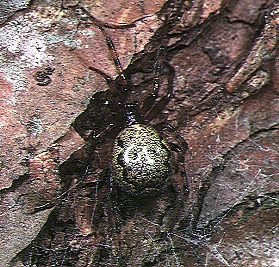
Enoplognatha abrupta, female

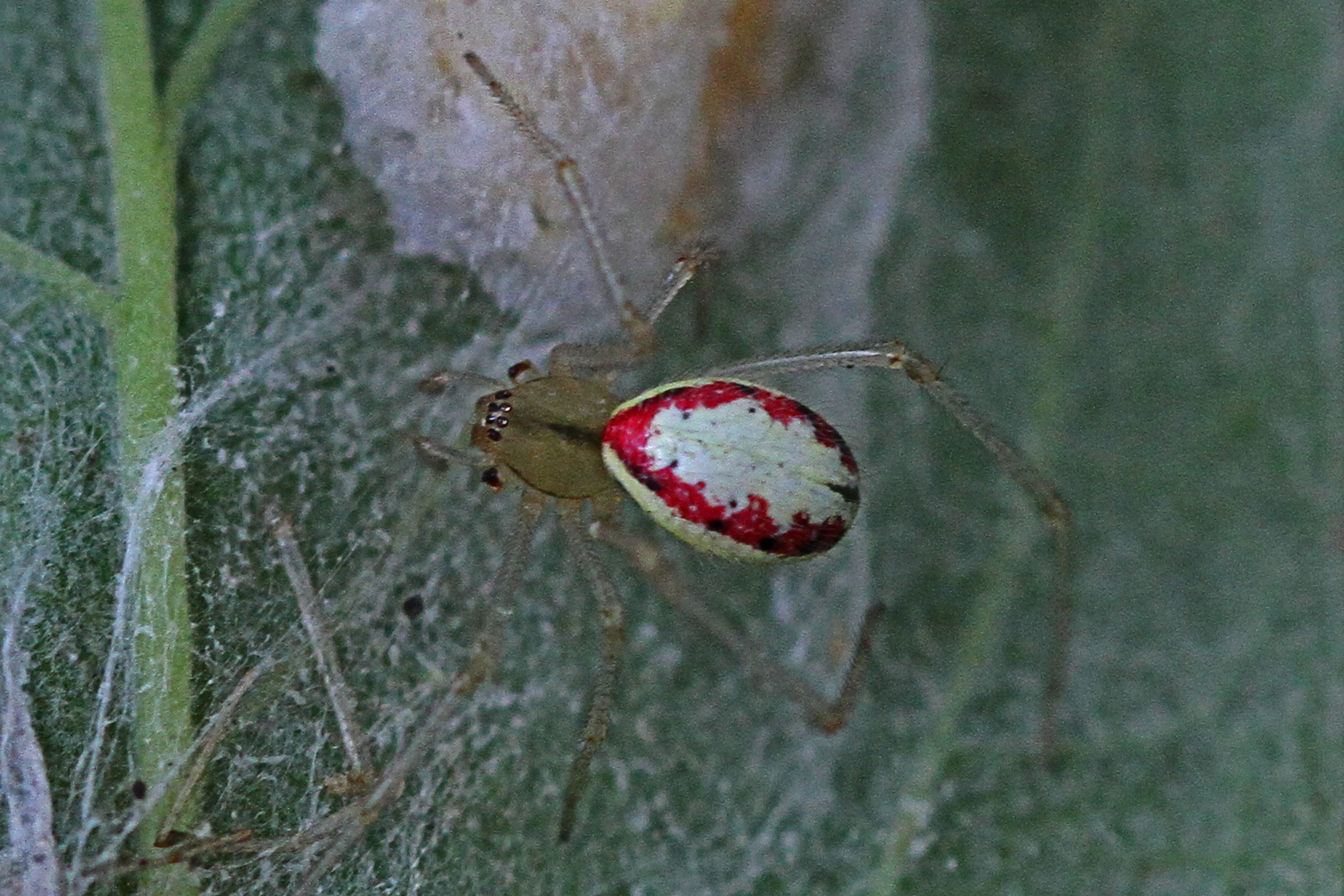
Enoplognatha ovata

Enoplognatha Pavesi, 1880

- Enoplognatha abrupta (Karsch, 1879) — Russia (Far East), China, Korea, Japan
- Enoplognatha afrodite Hippa & Oksala, 1983 — Southern Europe
- Enoplognatha almeriensis Bosmans & Van Keer, 1999 — Portugal, Spain
- Enoplognatha angkora Barrion, Barrion-Dupo & Heong, 2013 — China
- Enoplognatha apaya Barrion & Litsinger, 1995 — Philippines
- Enoplognatha bidens Simon, 1908 — Australia (Western Australia)
- Enoplognatha biskrensis Denis, 1945 — Morocco, Algeria, Tunisia
- Enoplognatha bobaiensis Zhu, 1998 — China
- Enoplognatha bryjai Řezáč, 2016 — Czech Rep.
- Enoplognatha cariasoi Barrion & Litsinger, 1995 — Philippines
- Enoplognatha caricis (Fickert, 1876) — Europe, Turkey, Russia (Europe to Far East), China, Korea, Japan
- Enoplognatha carinata Bosmans & Van Keer, 1999 — Morocco, Algeria
- Enoplognatha daweiensis Yin & Yan, 2012 — China
- Enoplognatha deserta Levy & Amitai, 1981 — Morocco to Israel
- Enoplognatha diodonta Zhu & Zhang, 1992 — Pakistan, India, China
- Enoplognatha diversa (Blackwall, 1859) — Canary Is., Madeira, Portugal, Spain, France, Morocco to Greece
- Enoplognatha franzi Wunderlich, 1995 — Mediterranean, Iraq
- Enoplognatha fuyangensis Barrion & He, 2017 — China
- Enoplognatha gemina Bosmans & Van Keer, 1999 — Mediterranean to Azerbaijan
- Enoplognatha gershomi Bosmans & Van Keer, 1999 — Israel
- Enoplognatha giladensis (Levy & Amitai, 1982) — Greece (Rhodes), Turkey, Israel, Azerbaijan
- Enoplognatha goulouensis Yin & Yan, 2012 — China
- Enoplognatha gramineusa Zhu, 1998 — China
- Enoplognatha hermani Bosmans & Van Keer, 1999 — Algeria
- Enoplognatha inornata O. Pickard-Cambridge, 1904 — South Africa
- Enoplognatha intrepida (Sørensen, 1898) — USA, Canada, Greenland, Korea
- Enoplognatha iraqi Najim, Al-Hadlak & Seyyar, 2015 — Iraq, Iran
- Enoplognatha joshua Chamberlin & Ivie, 1942 — USA
- Enoplognatha juninensis (Keyserling, 1884) — Peru
- Enoplognatha kalaykayina Barrion & Litsinger, 1995 — Philippines
- Enoplognatha latimana Hippa & Oksala, 1982 — Canada, Europe, North Africa, Turkey, Caucasus, Russia (Europe) to Central Asia
- Enoplognatha lordosa Zhu & Song, 1992 — China, Japan
- Enoplognatha macrochelis Levy & Amitai, 1981 — Macedonia, Greece, Turkey, Cyprus, Israel, Azerbaijan
- Enoplognatha malapahabanda Barrion & Litsinger, 1995 — Philippines
- Enoplognatha mandibularis (Lucas, 1846) (type) — Europe, North Africa, Turkey, Israel, Russia (Europe) to Central Asia, China
- Enoplognatha mangshan Yin, 2012 — China
- Enoplognatha margarita Yaginuma, 1964 — Kazakhstan, Russia (Central Asia to Far East), China, Korea, Japan
- Enoplognatha mariae Bosmans & Van Keer, 1999 — Greece, Russia (Caucasus)
- Enoplognatha maricopa Levi, 1962 — USA
- Enoplognatha marmorata (Hentz, 1850) — North America
- Enoplognatha maysanga Barrion & Litsinger, 1995 — Philippines
- Enoplognatha mediterranea Levy & Amitai, 1981 — Turkey, Cyprus, Israel, Azerbaijan
- Enoplognatha melanicruciata Saito, 1939 — Japan
- Enoplognatha molesta O. Pickard-Cambridge, 1904 — South Africa
- Enoplognatha monstrabilis Marusik & Logunov, 2002 — Russia (south Siberia)
- Enoplognatha mordax (Thorell, 1875) — Europe, North Africa, Turkey, Caucasus, Russia (Europe) to Tajikistan, China
- Enoplognatha nigromarginata (Lucas, 1846) — Spain to Greece, Morocco, Algeria
- Enoplognatha oelandica (Thorell, 1875) — Europe, Caucasus, Kazakhstan, China
- Enoplognatha oreophila (Simon, 1894) — Sri Lanka
- Enoplognatha orientalis Schenkel, 1963 — China
- Enoplognatha ovata (Clerck, 1757) — North America, Europe, Turkey, Caucasus, Russia (Europe to middle Siberia), Central Asia, Japan
- Enoplognatha parathoracica Levy & Amitai, 1981 — Turkey, Israel, Azerbaijan
- Enoplognatha penelope Hippa & Oksala, 1982 — Bulgaria, Greece (incl. Crete)
- Enoplognatha peruviana Chamberlin, 1916 — Peru
- Enoplognatha philippinensis Barrion & Litsinger, 1995 — Philippines
- Enoplognatha procerula Simon, 1909 — South Africa
- Enoplognatha pulatuberculata Barrion & Litsinger, 1995 — Philippines
- Enoplognatha puno Levi, 1962 — Peru
- Enoplognatha qiuae Zhu, 1998 — China
- Enoplognatha quadripunctata Simon, 1884 — Mediterranean, Caucasus, Kazakhstan
- Enoplognatha robusta Thorell, 1898 — Myanmar
- Enoplognatha sattleri Bösenberg, 1895 — Madeira, Salvages, Canary Is.
- Enoplognatha selma Chamberlin & Ivie, 1946 — USA
- Enoplognatha serratosignata (L. Koch, 1879) — Europe, Caucasus, Russia (Europe to Far East), Kazakhstan, China
- Enoplognatha tadzhica Sytshevskaja, 1975 — Tajikistan
- Enoplognatha testacea Simon, 1884 — Southern, Central Europe to Central Asia
- Enoplognatha thoracica (Hahn, 1833) — North America, Europe, Turkey, North Africa, Syria, Iran, Turkmenistan
- Enoplognatha turkestanica Charitonov, 1946 — Iran, Central Asia
- Enoplognatha tuybaana Barrion & Litsinger, 1995 — Philippines
- Enoplognatha verae Bosmans & Van Keer, 1999 — Morocco, Spain, Tunisia, Italy, Greece
- Enoplognatha wyuta Chamberlin & Ivie, 1942 — USA
- Enoplognatha yelpantrapensis Barrion & Litsinger, 1995 — Philippines
- Enoplognatha yizhangensis Yin, 2012 — China
- Enoplognatha zapfeae Levi, 1962 — Chile

=== Episinus ===
Episinus

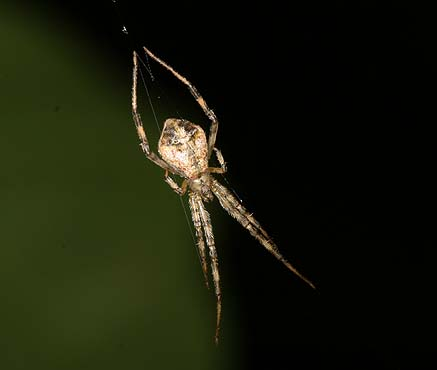
Episinus affinis, female

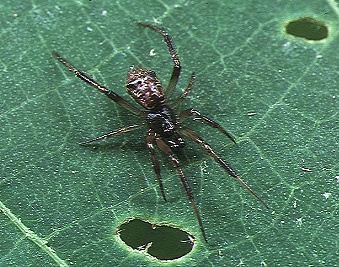
Episinus nubilus, male

Episinus Walckenaer, 1809

- Episinus affinis Bösenberg & Strand, 1906 — India, Russia (Far East), Korea, Taiwan, Japan, Ryukyu Is.
- Episinus albostriatus (Simon, 1895) — Peru
- Episinus algiricus Lucas, 1846 — Portugal, Spain, France, Italy, Northwest Africa, Malta?
- Episinus amoenus Banks, 1911 — USA, Mexico
- Episinus angulatus (Blackwall, 1836) — Europe, Turkey, Russia (Europe to west Siberia), Central Asia
- Episinus antipodianus O. Pickard-Cambridge, 1880 — New Zealand
- Episinus aspus Levi, 1964 — Nicaragua
- Episinus bilineatus Simon, 1894 — South Africa
- Episinus bimucronatus (Simon, 1895) — Venezuela
- Episinus bishopi (Lessert, 1929) — Congo
- Episinus cavernicola (Kulczyński, 1897) — Croatia, Slovenia
- Episinus chiapensis Levi, 1955 — Mexico
- Episinus chikunii Yoshida, 1985 — Japan
- Episinus colima Levi, 1955 — Mexico to Panama
- Episinus crysus Buckup & Marques, 1992 — Brazil
- Episinus cuzco Levi, 1967 — Peru
- Episinus dominicus Levi, 1955 — Hispaniola
- Episinus emanus Levi, 1964 — Panama
- Episinus fontinalis Levy, 1985 — Israel
- Episinus garisus Buckup & Marques, 1992 — Brazil
- Episinus gibbus Zhu & Wang, 1995 — China
- Episinus hickmani Caporiacco, 1949 — Kenya
- Episinus immundus (Keyserling, 1884) — Peru, Brazil
- Episinus implexus (Simon, 1894) — Venezuela
- Episinus israeliensis Levy, 1985 — Israel
- Episinus jimmyi Chavari & Brescovit, 2014 — Colombia
- Episinus juarezi Levi, 1955 — Mexico
- Episinus kitazawai Yaginuma, 1958 — Russia (Kurile Is.), Japan
- Episinus longabdomenus Zhu, 1998 — China
- Episinus macrops Simon, 1903 — Equatorial Guinea, Congo
- Episinus maculipes Cavanna, 1876 — Europe, Algeria, Turkey, Caucasus
  - Episinus maculipes numidicus Kulczyński, 1905 — Algeria, Tunisia
- Episinus maderianus Kulczyński, 1905 — Canary Is., Madeira
- Episinus makiharai Okuma, 1994 — Taiwan
- Episinus marignaci (Lessert, 1933) — Angola
- Episinus meruensis Tullgren, 1910 — Tanzania
- Episinus moyobamba Levi, 1964 — Peru
- Episinus mucronatus (Simon, 1894) — Singapore
- Episinus nadleri Levi, 1955 — Bahama Is., Jamaica
- Episinus nanyue Yin, 2012 — China
- Episinus nubilus Yaginuma, 1960 — China, Korea, Taiwan, Japan, Ryukyu Is.
- Episinus panamensis Levi, 1955 — Panama
- Episinus pentagonalis Chakrabarti, 2013 — India
- Episinus porteri (Simon, 1901) — Chile, Argentina
- Episinus punctisparsus Yoshida, 1983 — Taiwan
- Episinus pyrus Levi, 1964 — Panama
- Episinus rhomboidalis (Simon, 1895) — Malaysia, Myanmar, Singapore
- Episinus rio Levi, 1967 — Brazil
- Episinus similanus Urquhart, 1893 — New Zealand
- Episinus similitudus Urquhart, 1893 — New Zealand
- Episinus taibeli Caporiacco, 1949 — Ethiopia
- Episinus teresopolis Levi, 1964 — Brazil
- Episinus theridioides Simon, 1873 — Spain, France (mainland, Corsica), Italy (Sardinia)
- Episinus truncatus Latreille, 1809 (type) — Europe, Turkey, Caucasus
- Episinus typicus (Nicolet, 1849) — Chile
- Episinus unitus Levi, 1964 — Cuba, Jamaica
- Episinus variacorneus Chen, Peng & Zhao, 1992 — China
- Episinus vaticus Levi, 1964 — Costa Rica, Panama
- Episinus xiushanicus Zhu, 1998 — China
- Episinus yoshidai Okuma, 1994 — Taiwan
- Episinus zurlus Levi, 1964 — Venezuela

=== Euryopis ===
Euryopis

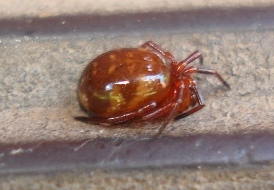
Euryopis flavomaculata

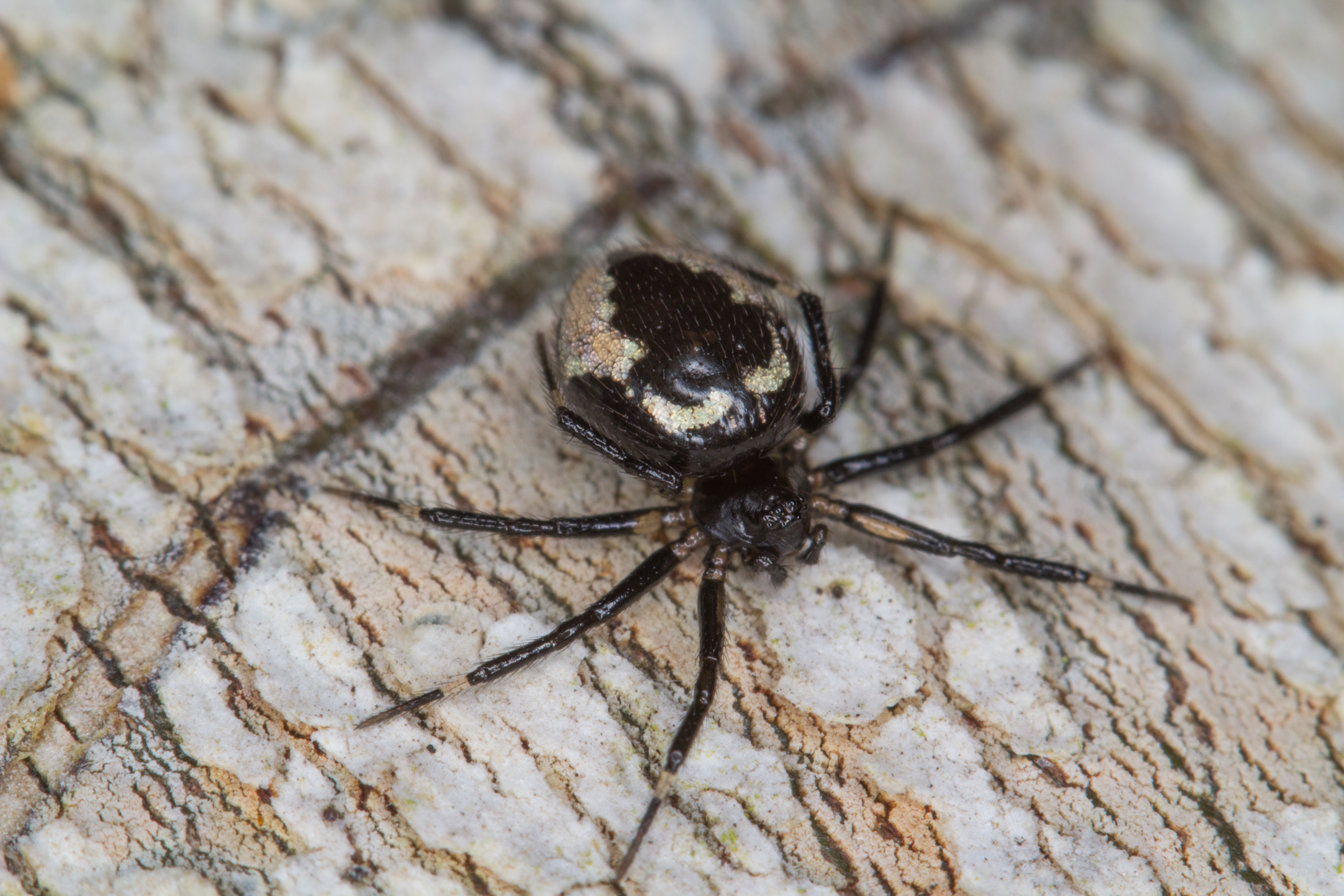
Euryopis splendens

Euryopis Menge, 1868

- Euryopis aeneocincta Simon, 1877 — Philippines
- Euryopis albomaculata Denis, 1951 — Egypt
- Euryopis argentea Emerton, 1882 — USA, Canada, Russia (Kamchatka)
- Euryopis bifascigera Strand, 1913 — Central Africa
- Euryopis californica Banks, 1904 — USA, Mexico
- Euryopis camis Levi, 1963 — Brazil
- Euryopis campestrata Simon, 1907 — Egypt
- Euryopis chatchikovi Ponomarev, 2005 — Russia (Europe)
- Euryopis clara Ponomarev, 2005 — Kazakhstan, Iran
- Euryopis cobreensis Levi, 1963 — Jamaica
- Euryopis coki Levi, 1954 — USA
- Euryopis cyclosisa Zhu & Song, 1997 — China
- Euryopis dentigera Simon, 1880 — France, Italy
- Euryopis deplanata Schenkel, 1936 — China
- Euryopis duodecimguttata Caporiacco, 1950 — Italy
- Euryopis elegans Keyserling, 1890 — Australia
- Euryopis elenae González, 1991 — Argentina
- Euryopis episinoides (Walckenaer, 1847) — Mediterranean to Turkey, Israel. Introduced to Reunion, India, China
- Euryopis estebani González, 1991 — Argentina
- Euryopis flavomaculata (C. L. Koch, 1836) (type) — Europe, Turkey, Caucasus, Russia (Europe to Far East), Kazakhstan, Central Asia, China, Japan
- Euryopis formosa Banks, 1908 — USA, Canada
- Euryopis funebris (Hentz, 1850) — USA, Canada
- Euryopis galeiforma Zhu, 1998 — China
- Euryopis gertschi Levi, 1951 — USA, Canada
- Euryopis giordanii Caporiacco, 1950 — Italy
- Euryopis hebraea Levy & Amitai, 1981 — Israel
- Euryopis helcra Roberts, 1983 — Seychelles (Aldabra)
- Euryopis iharai Yoshida, 1992 — Japan, Ryukyu Is.
- Euryopis jucunda Thorell, 1895 — Myanmar
- Euryopis laeta (Westring, 1861) — Europe, Tunisia, Turkey, Caucasus, Russia (Europe to south Siberia), Kazakhstan, Central Asia
- Euryopis levii Heimer, 1987 — Mongolia
- Euryopis lineatipes O. Pickard-Cambridge, 1893 — USA to Colombia
- Euryopis maga Simon, 1908 — Australia (Western Australia)
- Euryopis margaritata (L. Koch, 1867) — Italy, Greece
- Euryopis megalops (Caporiacco, 1934) — Karakorum
- Euryopis mingyaoi Yin, 2012 — China
- Euryopis molopica Thorell, 1895 — Myanmar
- Euryopis mulaiki Levi, 1954 — USA, Mexico
- Euryopis multipunctata (Simon, 1895) — Australia (Victoria)
- Euryopis mutoloi Caporiacco, 1948 — Greece
- Euryopis nana (O. Pickard-Cambridge, 1880) — New Zealand
- Euryopis nigra Yoshida, 2000 — Japan
- Euryopis notabilis (Keyserling, 1891) — Brazil
- Euryopis nubila Simon, 1889 — India
- Euryopis octomaculata (Paik, 1995) — Korea, Japan
- Euryopis orsovensis Kulczyński, 1894 — Hungary, Turkey
- Euryopis pepini Levi, 1954 — USA
- Euryopis perpusilla Ono, 2011 — Japan
- Euryopis petricola (Hickman, 1951) — Australia (Tasmania)
- Euryopis pickardi Levi, 1963 — Jamaica, Panama to Peru
- Euryopis pilosa Miller, 1970 — Angola
- Euryopis potteri Simon, 1901 — Ethiopia
- Euryopis praemitis Simon, 1909 — Vietnam
- Euryopis promo González, 1991 — Argentina
- Euryopis quinqueguttata Thorell, 1875 — Europe, Egypt, Caucasus, Turkmenistan
- Euryopis quinquemaculata Banks, 1900 — USA
- Euryopis sagittata (O. Pickard-Cambridge, 1885) — China (Yarkand)
- Euryopis saukea Levi, 1951 — North America, Europe, Russia (Europe to Far East), Azerbaijan, Kazakhstan
- Euryopis scriptipes Banks, 1908 — North America
- Euryopis sexalbomaculata (Lucas, 1846) — Mediterranean, Ukraine, Russia (Caucasus), Iran
- Euryopis sexmaculata Hu, 2001 — China
- Euryopis spinifera (Mello-Leitão, 1944) — Argentina
- Euryopis spinigera O. Pickard-Cambridge, 1895 — USA to Colombia
- Euryopis spiritus Levi, 1954 — USA
- Euryopis splendens (Rainbow, 1916) — Australia (New South Wales)
- Euryopis splendida (Simon, 1889) — New Caledonia
- Euryopis superba (Rainbow, 1896) — Australia (New South Wales, Victoria)
- Euryopis talaveraensis González, 1991 — Argentina
- Euryopis tavara Levi, 1954 — USA
- Euryopis texana Banks, 1908 — USA, Mexico
- Euryopis tribulata Simon, 1905 — Argentina
- Euryopis umbilicata L. Koch, 1872 — Australia
- Euryopis varis Levi, 1963 — USA
- Euryopis venutissima (Caporiacco, 1934) — Karakorum
- Euryopis weesei Levi, 1963 — USA

=== Eurypoena ===
Eurypoena Wunderlich, 1992

- Eurypoena tuberosa (Wunderlich, 1987) (type) — Canary Is.
  - Eurypoena tuberosa alegranzaensis Wunderlich, 1992 — Canary Is.

=== Exalbidion ===
Exalbidion Wunderlich, 1995

- Exalbidion barroanum (Levi, 1959) — Panama, Ecuador
- Exalbidion dotanum (Banks, 1914) — Mexico to Panama
- Exalbidion fungosum (Keyserling, 1886) — Venezuela, Ecuador, Peru, Brazil, Argentina
- Exalbidion pallisterorum (Levi, 1959) — Mexico
- Exalbidion rufipunctum (Levi, 1959) — Panama, Ecuador
- Exalbidion sexmaculatum (Keyserling, 1884) (type) — Guatemala, Caribbean to Brazil

== F ==
=== Faiditus ===
Faiditus

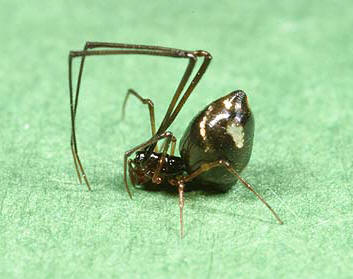
Faiditus xiphias

Faiditus Keyserling, 1884

- Faiditus acuminatus (Keyserling, 1891) — Brazil, Argentina
- Faiditus affinis (O. Pickard-Cambridge, 1880) — Brazil
- Faiditus alticeps (Keyserling, 1891) — Brazil, Paraguay
- Faiditus altus (Keyserling, 1891) — Venezuela, Brazil
- Faiditus amates (Exline & Levi, 1962) — Mexico, Guatemala
- Faiditus americanus (Taczanowski, 1874) — USA to Brazil, Argentina
- Faiditus amplifrons (O. Pickard-Cambridge, 1880) — Panama to Argentina
- Faiditus analiae (González & Carmen, 1996) — Brazil
- Faiditus arthuri (Exline & Levi, 1962) — Panama
- Faiditus atopus (Chamberlin & Ivie, 1936) — Panama to Ecuador
- Faiditus bryantae (Exline & Levi, 1962) — Costa Rica, Panama
- Faiditus cancellatus (Hentz, 1850) — USA, Canada, Bahama Is.
- Faiditus caronae (González & Carmen, 1996) — Brazil
- Faiditus caudatus (Taczanowski, 1874) — USA, Caribbean to Argentina
- Faiditus chicaensis (González & Carmen, 1996) — Argentina
- Faiditus chickeringi (Exline & Levi, 1962) — Panama
- Faiditus cochleaformus (Exline, 1945) — Ecuador, Peru
- Faiditus convolutus (Exline & Levi, 1962) — Guatemala to Peru, Brazil
- Faiditus cordillera (Exline, 1945) — Ecuador
- Faiditus cristinae (González & Carmen, 1996) — Brazil
- Faiditus cubensis (Exline & Levi, 1962) — Cuba
- Faiditus darlingtoni (Exline & Levi, 1962) — Jamaica, Hispaniola
- Faiditus davisi (Exline & Levi, 1962) — USA, Mexico
- Faiditus dracus (Chamberlin & Ivie, 1936) — USA to Paraguay
- Faiditus duckensis (González & Carmen, 1996) — Brazil
- Faiditus ecaudatus Keyserling, 1884 (type) — Brazil
- Faiditus exiguus (Exline & Levi, 1962) — Cuba, Puerto Rico
- Faiditus fulvus (Exline & Levi, 1962) — Brazil
- Faiditus gapensis (Exline & Levi, 1962) — Jamaica
- Faiditus gertschi (Exline & Levi, 1962) — Panama
- Faiditus globosus (Keyserling, 1884) — USA to Ecuador
- Faiditus godmani (Exline & Levi, 1962) — Guatemala
- Faiditus iguazuensis (González & Carmen, 1996) — Argentina
- Faiditus jamaicensis (Exline & Levi, 1962) — Jamaica
- Faiditus laraensis (González & Carmen, 1996) — Argentina
- Faiditus leonensis (Exline & Levi, 1962) — Mexico
- Faiditus maculosus (O. Pickard-Cambridge, 1898) — USA, Mexico
- Faiditus mariae (González & Carmen, 1996) — Argentina
- Faiditus morretensis (González & Carmen, 1996) — Brazil, Argentina
- Faiditus nataliae (González & Carmen, 1996) — Argentina
- Faiditus peruensis (Exline & Levi, 1962) — Peru
- Faiditus plaumanni (Exline & Levi, 1962) — Brazil
- Faiditus proboscifer (Exline, 1945) — Ecuador, Peru
- Faiditus quasiobtusus (Exline & Levi, 1962) — Puerto Rico, Virgin Is.
- Faiditus rossi (Exline & Levi, 1962) — Colombia
- Faiditus sicki (Exline & Levi, 1962) — Brazil
- Faiditus solidao (Levi, 1967) — Brazil
- Faiditus spinosus (Keyserling, 1884) — Venezuela, Peru
- Faiditus striatus (Keyserling, 1891) — Brazil
- Faiditus subdolus (O. Pickard-Cambridge, 1898) — USA to Guatemala
- Faiditus subflavus (Exline & Levi, 1962) — Peru
- Faiditus sullana (Exline, 1945) — Peru
- Faiditus taeter (Exline & Levi, 1962) — Mexico
- Faiditus ululans (O. Pickard-Cambridge, 1880) — Mexico to Brazil
- Faiditus vadoensis (González & Carmen, 1996) — Argentina
- Faiditus woytkowskii (Exline & Levi, 1962) — Peru
- Faiditus xiphias (Thorell, 1887) — Myanmar, India (Nicobar Is.) to Japan, Indonesia (Krakatau)
- Faiditus yacuiensis (González & Carmen, 1996) — Argentina
- Faiditus yutoensis (González & Carmen, 1996) — Argentina

== G ==
=== Glebych ===
Glebych Eskov & Marusik, 2021

- Glebych minutissimus Eskov & Marusik, 2021 (type) — Peru

=== Gmogala ===
Gmogala Keyserling, 1890

- Gmogala scarabaeus Keyserling, 1890 (type) — New Guinea, Australia

=== Grancanaridion ===
Grancanaridion Wunderlich, 2011

- Grancanaridion grancanariense (Wunderlich, 1987) (type) — Canary Islands.

=== Guaraniella ===
Guaraniella Baert, 1984

- Guaraniella bracata Baert, 1984 — Brazil, Paraguay
- Guaraniella mahnerti Baert, 1984 (type) — Brazil, Paraguay

== H ==
=== Hadrotarsus ===
Hadrotarsus Thorell, 1881

- Hadrotarsus babirussa Thorell, 1881 (type) — New Guinea
- Hadrotarsus fulvus Hickman, 1943 — Australia (Tasmania)
- Hadrotarsus ornatus Hickman, 1943 — Australia (Tasmania). Introduced to Belgium
- Hadrotarsus setosus Hickman, 1943 — Australia (Tasmania)
- Hadrotarsus yamius Wang, 1955 — Taiwan

=== Helvibis ===
Helvibis Keyserling, 1884

- Helvibis brasiliana (Keyserling, 1884) — Peru
- Helvibis chilensis (Keyserling, 1884) — Chile, Brazil
- Helvibis germaini Simon, 1895 — Peru, Brazil
- Helvibis infelix (O. Pickard-Cambridge, 1880) — Brazil
- Helvibis longicauda Keyserling, 1891 — Brazil
- Helvibis longistyla (F. O. Pickard-Cambridge, 1902) — Panama, Trinidad
- Helvibis monticola Keyserling, 1891 — Brazil
- Helvibis rossi Levi, 1964 — Peru
- Helvibis thorelli Keyserling, 1884 (type) — Peru, Brazil
- Helvibis tingo Levi, 1964 — Peru

=== Helvidia ===
Helvidia Thorell, 1890

- Helvidia scabricula Thorell, 1890 (type) — Indonesia (Sumatra)

=== Hentziectypus ===
Hentziectypus

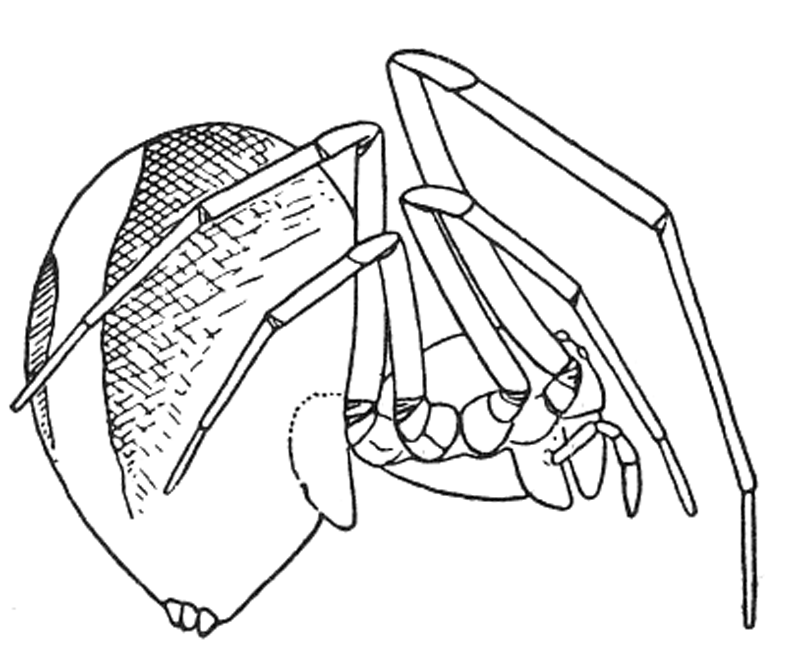
Hentziectypus globosus

Hentziectypus Archer, 1946

- Hentziectypus annus (Levi, 1959) — Jamaica, Bermuda
- Hentziectypus apex (Levi, 1959) — Panama
- Hentziectypus conjunctus (Gertsch & Mulaik, 1936) — USA, Canada
- Hentziectypus florendidus (Levi, 1959) — USA to Venezuela
- Hentziectypus florens (O. Pickard-Cambridge, 1896) — USA to Panama, Cuba
- Hentziectypus globosus (Hentz, 1850) (type) — North America
- Hentziectypus hermosillo (Levi, 1959) — Mexico
- Hentziectypus rafaeli (Buckup & Marques, 1991) — Bolivia, Brazil
- Hentziectypus schullei (Gertsch & Mulaik, 1936) — USA, Mexico
- Hentziectypus serax (Levi, 1959) — Mexico
- Hentziectypus tayrona Buckup, Marques & Rodrigues, 2012 — Colombia
- Hentziectypus turquino (Levi, 1959) — Cuba

=== Heterotheridion ===
Heterotheridion Wunderlich, 2008

- Heterotheridion nigrovariegatum (Simon, 1873) (type) — Europe, Turkey, Caucasus, Russia (Europe) to Central Asia, China

=== Hetschkia ===
Hetschkia Keyserling, 1886

- Hetschkia gracilis Keyserling, 1886 (type) — Brazil

=== Histagonia ===
Histagonia Simon, 1895

- Histagonia deserticola Simon, 1895 (type) — South Africa

== I ==
=== Icona ===
Icona Forster, 1955

- Icona alba Forster, 1955 (type) — New Zealand (Auckland Is., Campbell Is.)
- Icona drama Forster, 1964 — New Zealand (Auckland Is.)

== J ==
=== Jamaitidion ===
Jamaitidion Wunderlich, 1995

- Jamaitidion jamaicense (Levi, 1959) (type) — Jamaica

=== Janula ===
Janula Strand, 1932

- Janula batman Yoshida & Koh, 2011 — Borneo
- Janula bicorniger (Simon, 1894) — Brazil
- Janula bicornis (Thorell, 1881) (type) — Australia (Queensland)
- Janula bicruciata (Simon, 1895) — Brazil
- Janula bifrons (Thorell, 1895) — Myanmar
- Janula bizona Yoshida & Koh, 2011 — Borneo
- Janula bruneiensis Yoshida & Koh, 2011 — Borneo
- Janula bubalis Yoshida & Koh, 2011 — Borneo
- Janula erythrophthalma (Simon, 1894) — Panama, Lesser Antilles to Bolivia
- Janula luteolimbata (Thorell, 1898) — Myanmar
- Janula malachina (Simon, 1895) — Peru
- Janula marginata (Thorell, 1898) — Myanmar
- Janula modesta (Thorell, 1898) — Myanmar
- Janula nebulosa (Simon, 1895) — Brazil, Paraguay
- Janula ocreata (Simon, 1909) — Vietnam
- Janula parva (Wunderlich, 2008) — Malaysia
- Janula picta (Simon, 1895) — Singapore
- Janula salobrensis (Simon, 1895) — Trinidad, Brazil, Guyana
- Janula taprobanica (Simon, 1895) — Sri Lanka
- Janula triangularis Yoshida & Koh, 2011 — Singapore, Indonesia (Borneo)
- Janula triocellata Yoshida & Koh, 2011 — Borneo

== K ==
=== Keijiella ===
Keijiella Yoshida, 2016

- Keijiella oculiprominens (Saito, 1939) (type) — China, Taiwan, Laos, Korea, Japan

=== Kochiura ===
Kochiura

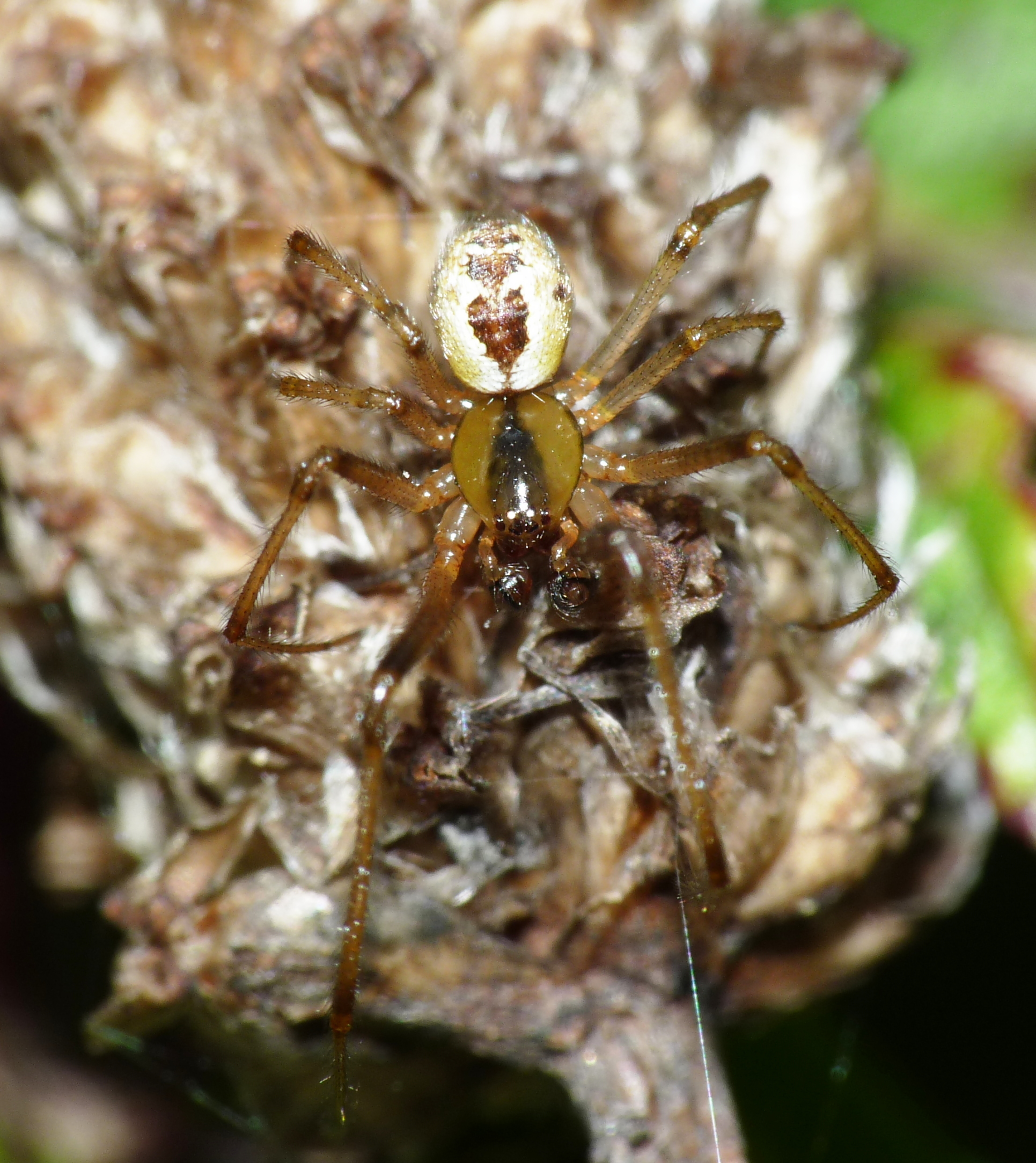
Kochiura aulica

Kochiura Archer, 1950

- Kochiura attrita (Nicolet, 1849) — Chile, Juan Fernandez Is.
- Kochiura aulica (C. L. Koch, 1838) (type) — Cape Verde Is., Canary Is., North Africa, Europe, Turkey, Caucasus
- Kochiura casablanca (Levi, 1963) — Chile
- Kochiura decolorata (Keyserling, 1886) — Brazil
- Kochiura ocellata (Nicolet, 1849) — Chile
- Kochiura olaup (Levi, 1963) — Brazil
- Kochiura rosea (Nicolet, 1849) — Chile, Juan Fernandez Is.
- Kochiura temuco (Levi, 1963) — Chile

=== Knoflachia ===
Knoflachia 2024

- Knoflachia kurilensis 2024

== L ==
=== Landoppo ===
Landoppo Barrion & Litsinger, 1995

- Landoppo misamisoriensis Barrion & Litsinger, 1995 (type) — Philippines

=== Lasaeola ===
Lasaeola Simon, 1881

- Lasaeola algarvensis Wunderlich, 2011 — Portugal
- Lasaeola armona Wunderlich, 2015 — Portugal, Spain
- Lasaeola atopa (Chamberlin, 1949) — USA
- Lasaeola bequaerti (Chickering, 1948) — Panama
- Lasaeola canariensis (Wunderlich, 1987) — Canary Is.
- Lasaeola convexa (Blackwall, 1870) — Mediterranean
- Lasaeola coracina (C. L. Koch, 1837) — Western Europe to Ukraine
- Lasaeola dbari Kovblyuk, Marusik & Omelko, 2012 — Georgia
- Lasaeola donaldi (Chickering, 1943) — Panama, Venezuela
- Lasaeola fastigata Zhang, Liu & Zhang, 2011 — China
- Lasaeola flavitarsis (Wunderlich, 1992) — Canary Is.
- Lasaeola grancanariensis (Wunderlich, 1987) — Canary Is.
- Lasaeola lunata Zhang, Liu & Zhang, 2011 — China
- Lasaeola minutissima Wunderlich, 2011 — Portugal, Spain
- Lasaeola oceanica Simon, 1883 — Azores
- Lasaeola okinawana (Yoshida & Ono, 2000) — China, Japan (Ryukyu Is.)
- Lasaeola prona (Menge, 1868) (type) — North America, Europe, Caucasus, Russia (Europe to south Siberia), Japan
- Lasaeola spinithorax (Keyserling, 1886) — Peru
- Lasaeola striata (Wunderlich, 1987) — Canary Is.
- Lasaeola superba (Chickering, 1948) — Mexico, Panama
- Lasaeola testaceomarginata Simon, 1881 — Mediterranean
- Lasaeola tristis (Hahn, 1833) — Europe, Turkey, Russia (Europe to south Siberia), Central Asia
  - Lasaeola tristis hissariensis (Charitonov, 1951) — Russia (south Siberia)
- Lasaeola yona (Yoshida & Ono, 2000) — Japan (Ryukyu Is.)
- Lasaeola yoshidai (Ono, 1991) — China, Korea, Japan

=== Latrodectus ===
Latrodectus

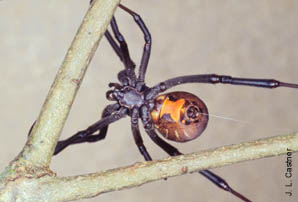
Brown widow spider
(Latrodectus geometricus)

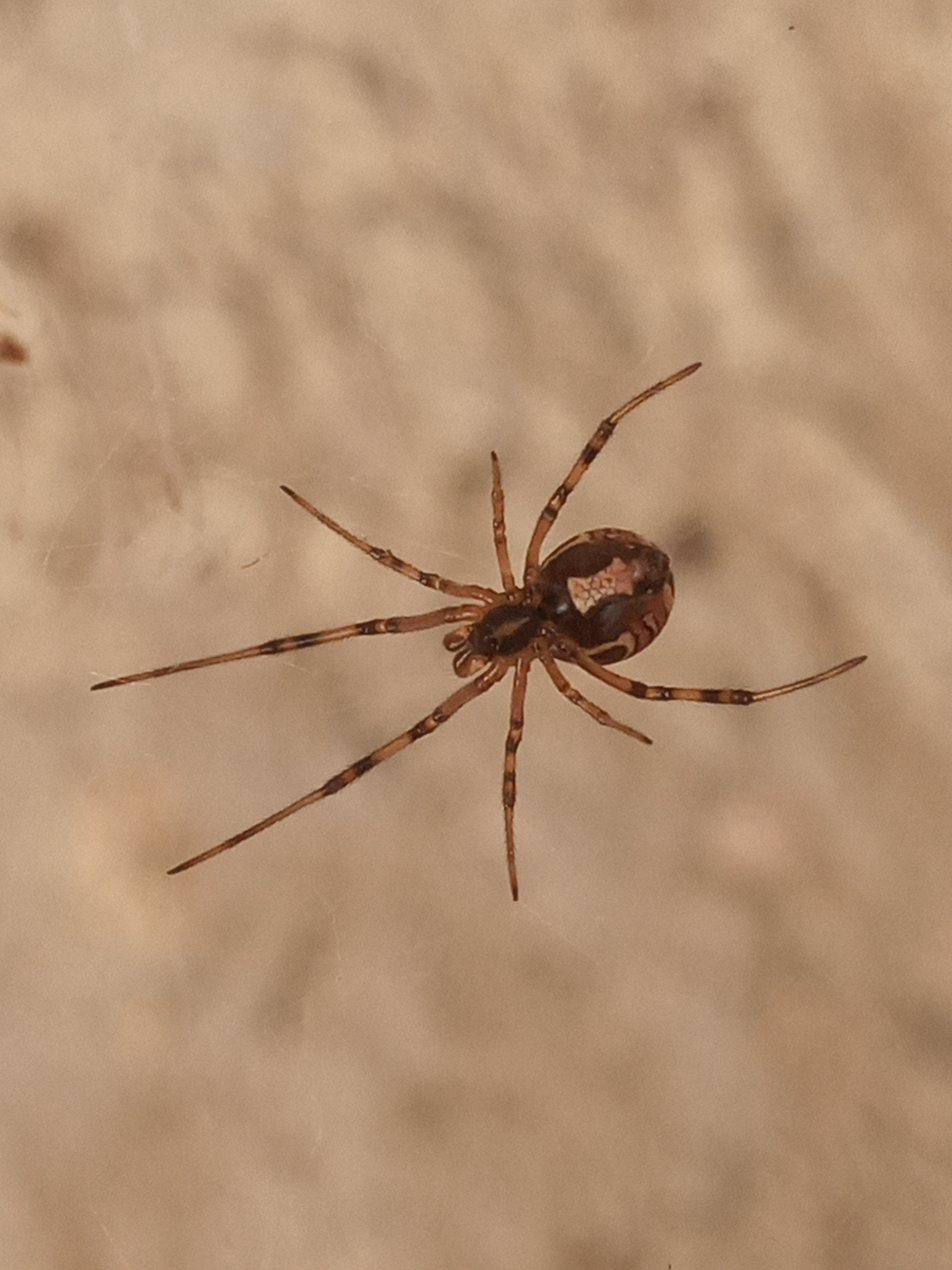
Western black widow
(Latrodectus hesperus), male

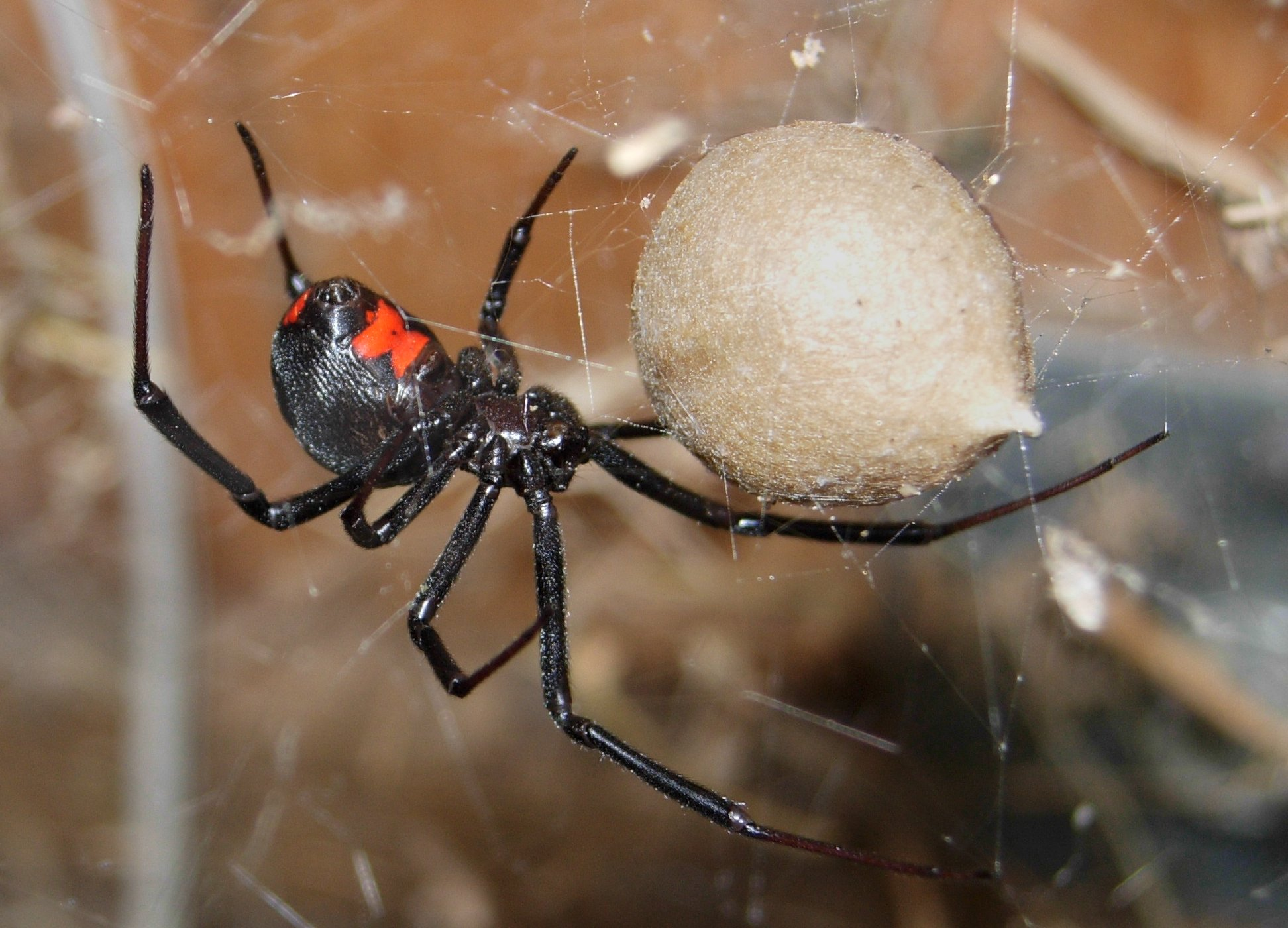
Black widow spider
(Latrodectus mactans), female

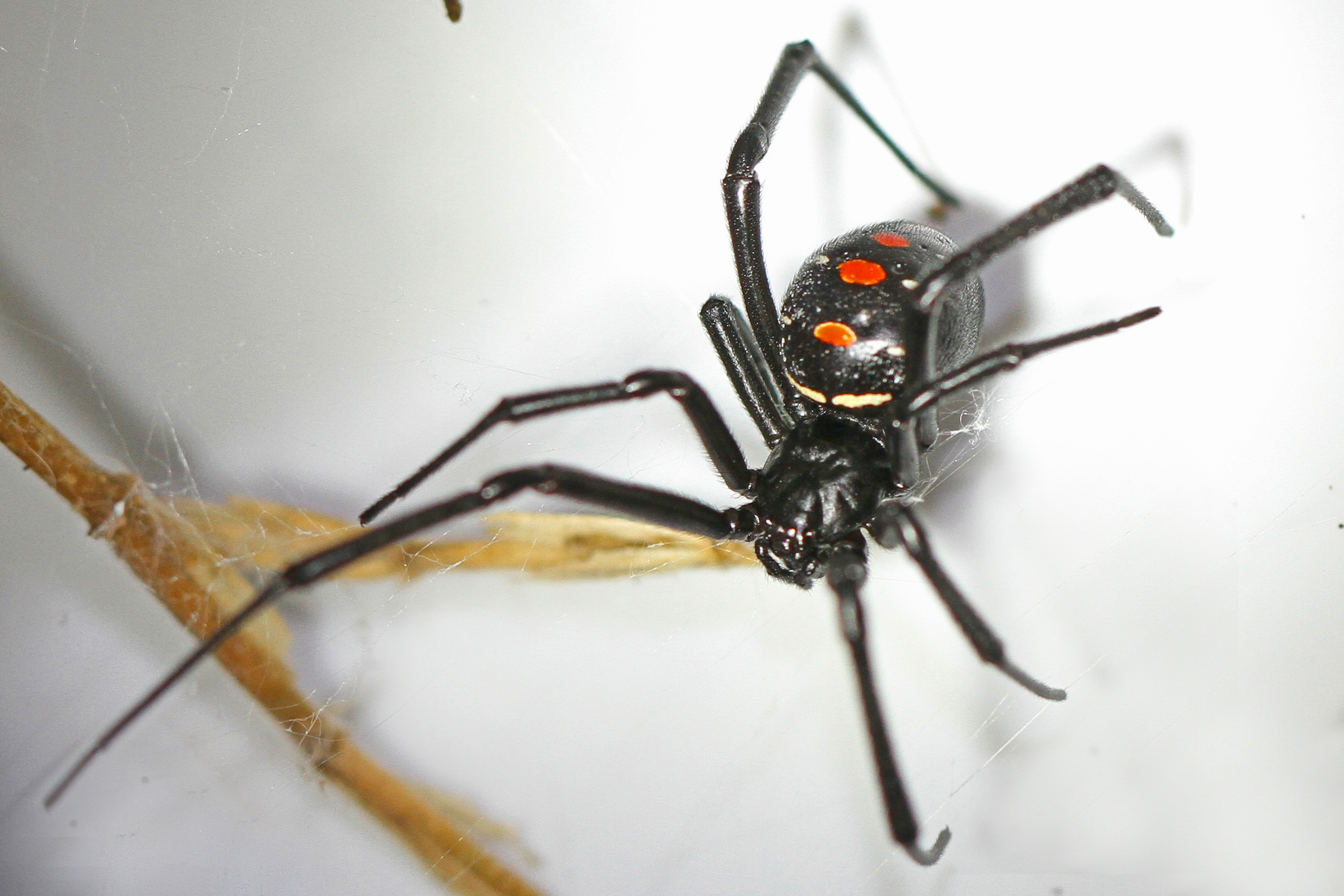
Northern black widow
(Latrodectus variolus)

Latrodectus Walckenaer, 1805

- Latrodectus antheratus (Badcock, 1932) — Paraguay, Argentina
- Latrodectus apicalis Butler, 1877 — Ecuador (Galapagos Is.)
- Latrodectus bishopi Kaston, 1938 — USA
- Latrodectus cinctus Blackwall, 1865 — Cape Verde Is., Africa, Kuwait, Iran
- Latrodectus corallinus Abalos, 1980 — Argentina
- Latrodectus curacaviensis (Müller, 1776) — Lesser Antilles, South America
- Latrodectus dahli Levi, 1959 — North Africa, Turkey, Azerbaijan, Kazakhstan, Central Asia
- Latrodectus diaguita Carcavallo, 1960 — Argentina
- Latrodectus elegans Thorell, 1898 — India, Myanmar, China, Japan
- Latrodectus erythromelas Schmidt & Klaas, 1991 — India, Sri Lanka
- Latrodectus geometricus C. L. Koch, 1841 — Africa. Introduced to both Americas, Poland, Middle East, Pakistan, India, Thailand, Japan, Papua New Guinea, Australia, Hawaii
- Latrodectus hasselti Thorell, 1870 — India, Southeast Asia to Australia, New Zealand
- Latrodectus hesperus Chamberlin & Ivie, 1935 — North America. Introduced to Israel
- Latrodectus hystrix Simon, 1890 — Yemen (mainland, Socotra)
- Latrodectus indistinctus O. Pickard-Cambridge, 1904 — Namibia, South Africa
- Latrodectus karrooensis Smithers, 1944 — South Africa
- Latrodectus katipo Powell, 1871 — New Zealand
- Latrodectus lilianae Melic, 2000 — Spain, Algeria
- Latrodectus mactans (Fabricius, 1775) — Probably native to North America only. Introduced to South America, Asia
- Latrodectus menavodi Vinson, 1863 — Madagascar, Comoros, Seychelles (Aldabra)
- Latrodectus mirabilis (Holmberg, 1876) — Argentina
- Latrodectus obscurior Dahl, 1902 — Cape Verde Is., Madagascar
- Latrodectus pallidus O. Pickard-Cambridge, 1872 — Cape Verde Is. to Libya, Turkey, Kazakhstan, Central Asia
- Latrodectus quartus Abalos, 1980 — Argentina
- Latrodectus renivulvatus Dahl, 1902 — Africa, Yemen, Saudi Arabia, Iraq
- Latrodectus revivensis Shulov, 1948 — Israel, Canary Is.?
- Latrodectus rhodesiensis Mackay, 1972 — Southern Africa
- Latrodectus thoracicus Nicolet, 1849 — Chile
- Latrodectus tredecimguttatus (Rossi, 1790) (type) — Mediterranea, Ukraine, Caucasus, Russia (Europe to south Siberia), Kazakhstan, Central Asia, China
- Latrodectus variegatus Nicolet, 1849 — Chile, Argentina
- Latrodectus variolus Walckenaer, 1837 — USA, Canada

== M ==
=== Macaridion ===
Macaridion Wunderlich, 1992

- Macaridion barreti (Kulczyński, 1899) (type) — Canary Is., Madeira

=== Magnopholcomma ===
Magnopholcomma Wunderlich, 2008

- Magnopholcomma globulus Wunderlich, 2008 (type) — Australia (Queensland)

=== Meotipa ===
Meotipa Simon, 1894

- Meotipa andamanensis (Tikader, 1977) — India (Andaman Is.)
- Meotipa argyrodiformis (Yaginuma, 1952) — China, Japan, Philippines, India
- Meotipa bituberculata Deeleman-Reinhold, 2009 — Indonesia (Sumatra, Java)
- Meotipa impatiens Deeleman-Reinhold, 2009 — Malaysia, Indonesia (Sumatra, Borneo)
- Meotipa makiling (Barrion-Dupo & Barrion, 2015) — Philippines
- Meotipa multuma Murthappa, Malamel, Prajapati, Sebastian & Venkateshwarlu, 2017 — India
- Meotipa pallida Deeleman-Reinhold, 2009 — Indonesia (Sumatra, Borneo)
- Meotipa picturata Simon, 1895 (type) — India, Thailand, Laos, Indonesia
- Meotipa pulcherrima (Mello-Leitão, 1917) — Tropical Africa. Introduced to the Americas, Papua New Guinea, China, Korea, Japan, Pacific Is.
- Meotipa sahyadri Kulkarni, Vartak, Deshpande & Halali, 2017 — India
- Meotipa spiniventris (O. Pickard-Cambridge, 1869) — Sri Lanka to Taiwan, China, Japan. Introduced to the Netherlands
- Meotipa thalerorum Deeleman-Reinhold, 2009 — Malaysia, Indonesia (Sumatra, Java)
- Meotipa vesiculosa Simon, 1895 — China, Vietnam to Japan, Philippines, Indonesia

=== Molione ===
Molione Thorell, 1892

- Molione christae Yoshida, 2003 — Borneo
- Molione kinabalu Yoshida, 2003 — China, Borneo
- Molione lemboda Gao & Li, 2010 — China
- Molione triacantha Thorell, 1892 (type) — India, China, Laos, Malaysia, Singapore, Taiwan
- Molione trispinosa (O. Pickard-Cambridge, 1873) — Sri Lanka
- Molione uniacantha Wunderlich, 1995 — Malaysia, Indonesia (Sumatra)

=== Moneta ===
Moneta

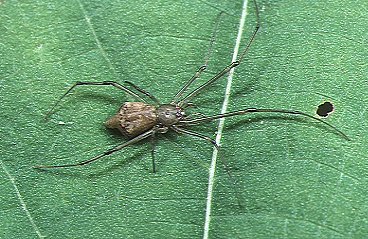
Moneta tanikawai, female

Moneta O. Pickard-Cambridge, 1871

- Moneta australis (Keyserling, 1890) — Australia (Queensland)
- Moneta baoae Yin, 2012 — China
- Moneta caudifera (Dönitz & Strand, 1906) — Russia (Far East), China, Korea, Japan
- Moneta coercervea (Roberts, 1978) — Seychelles
- Moneta conifera (Urquhart, 1887) — New Zealand
- Moneta furva Yin, 2012 — China
- Moneta grandis Simon, 1905 — India
- Moneta hunanica Zhu, 1998 — China
- Moneta longicauda Simon, 1908 — Australia (Western Australia)
- Moneta mirabilis (Bösenberg & Strand, 1906) — China, Korea, Laos, Malaysia, Taiwan, Japan
- Moneta orientalis Simon, 1909 — Vietnam
- Moneta spinigera O. Pickard-Cambridge, 1871 (type) — Africa, Asia
- Moneta spinigeroides (Zhu & Song, 1992) — China
- Moneta subspinigera Zhu, 1998 — China
- Moneta tanikawai (Yoshida, 1991) — Japan
- Moneta triquetra Simon, 1889 — New Caledonia
- Moneta tumida Zhu, 1998 — China
- Moneta tumulicola Zhu, 1998 — China
- Moneta uncinata Zhu, 1998 — China
- Moneta variabilis Rainbow, 1920 — Australia (Lord Howe Is.)
- Moneta yoshimurai (Yoshida, 1983) — Taiwan

=== Montanidion ===
Montanidion Wunderlich, 2011

- Montanidion kuantanense Wunderlich, 2011 (type) — Malaysia

== N ==
=== Nanume ===
Nanume Saaristo, 2006

- Nanume naneum (Roberts, 1983) (type) — Seychelles (Aldabra)

=== Neopisinus ===
Neopisinus Marques, Buckup & Rodrigues, 2011

- Neopisinus bigibbosus (O. Pickard-Cambridge, 1896) — Panama
- Neopisinus bruneoviridis (Mello-Leitão, 1948) — Panama, Trinidad to Brazil
- Neopisinus cognatus (O. Pickard-Cambridge, 1893) — USA to Peru, Brazil
- Neopisinus fiapo Marques, Buckup & Rodrigues, 2011 (type) — Brazil
- Neopisinus gratiosus (Bryant, 1940) — Cuba, Hispaniola
- Neopisinus longipes (Keyserling, 1884) — Peru, Brazil
- Neopisinus putus (O. Pickard-Cambridge, 1894) — Mexico to Panama
- Neopisinus recifensis (Levi, 1964) — Brazil
- Neopisinus urucu Marques, Buckup & Rodrigues, 2011 — Brazil

=== Neospintharus ===
Neospintharus

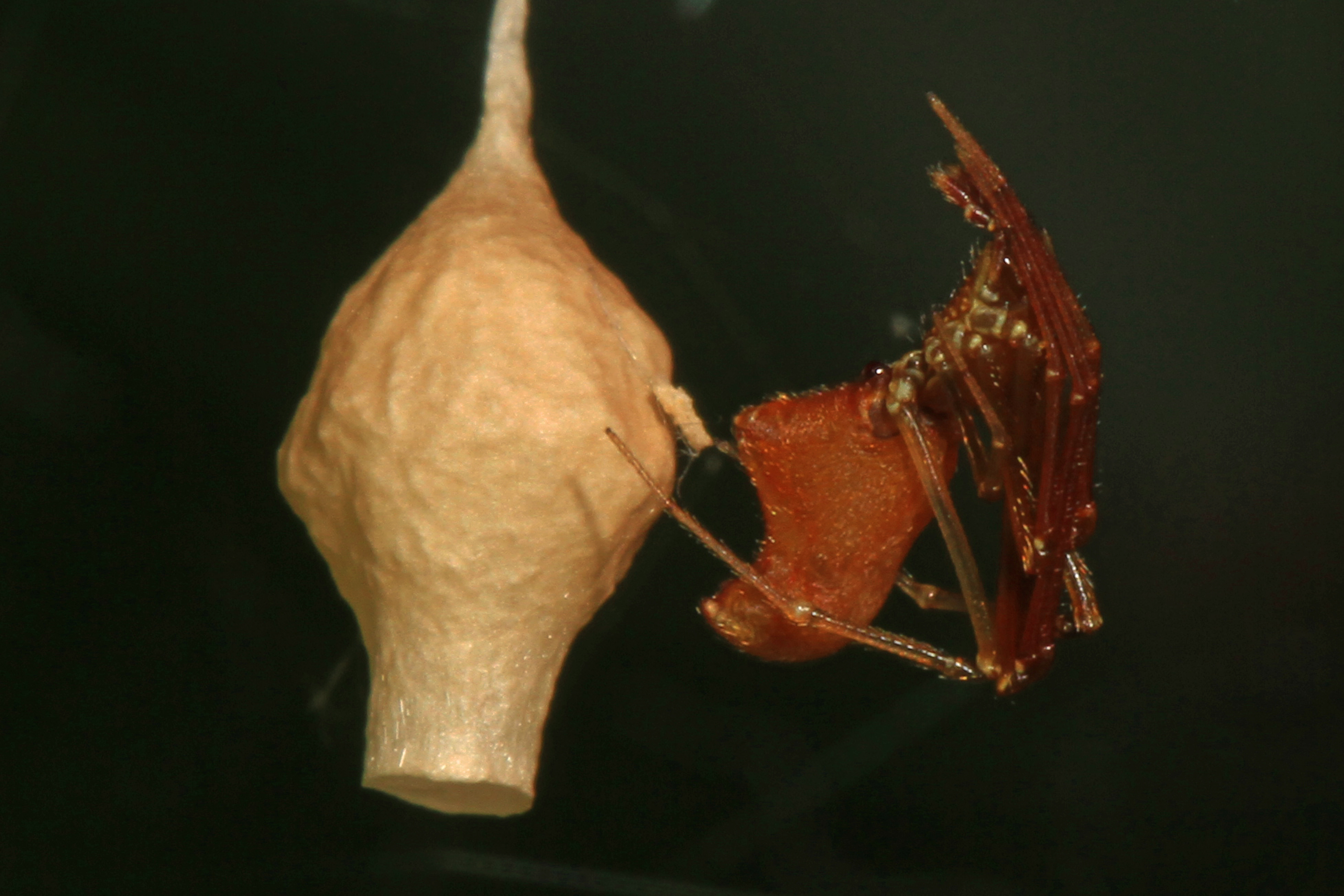
Neospintharus trigonum

Neospintharus Exline, 1950

- Neospintharus baboquivari (Exline & Levi, 1962) — USA, Mexico
- Neospintharus baekamensis Seo, 2010 — Korea
- Neospintharus bicornis (O. Pickard-Cambridge, 1880) — Brazil
- Neospintharus concisus (Exline & Levi, 1962) — Mexico
- Neospintharus fur (Bösenberg & Strand, 1906) — China, Korea, Japan
- Neospintharus furcatus (O. Pickard-Cambridge, 1894) — USA to El Salvador, Caribbean
- Neospintharus nipponicus (Kumada, 1990) — China, Korea, Japan
- Neospintharus obscurus (Keyserling, 1884) — Peru
- Neospintharus parvus Exline, 1950 (type) — Panama to Ecuador
- Neospintharus rioensis (Exline & Levi, 1962) — Brazil, Argentina
- Neospintharus syriacus (O. Pickard-Cambridge, 1872) — Turkey, Lebanon, Israel
- Neospintharus triangularis (Taczanowski, 1873) — Panama, French Guiana
- Neospintharus trigonum (Hentz, 1850) — USA, Canada

=== Neottiura ===
Neottiura

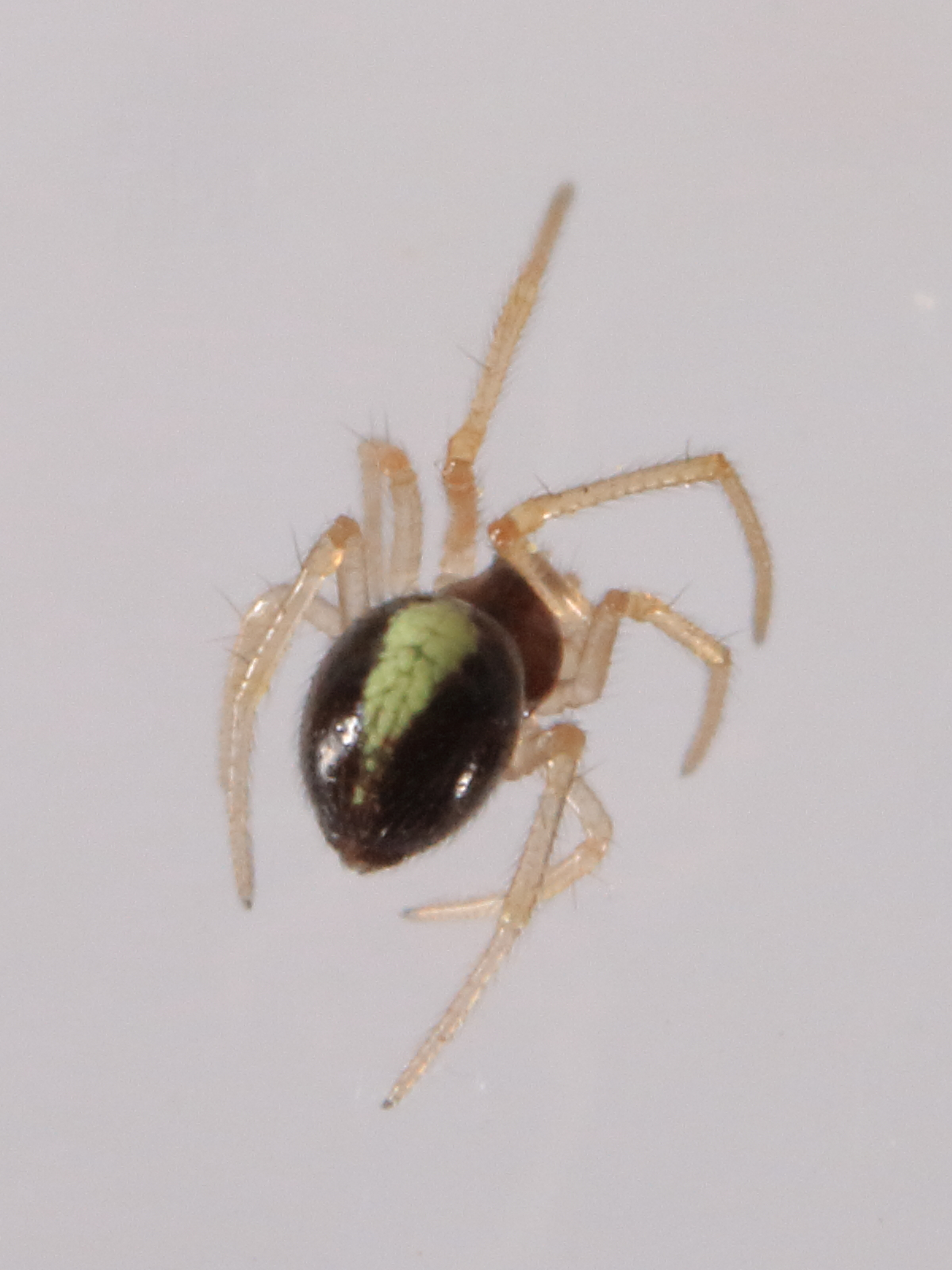
Neottiura bimaculata

Neottiura Menge, 1868

- Neottiura bimaculata (Linnaeus, 1767) (type) — North America, Europe, Turkey, Caucasus, Russia (Europe to Far East), Central Asia, China, Japan
  - Neottiura bimaculata pellucida (Simon, 1873) — Spain, France, Italy
- Neottiura curvimana (Simon, 1914) — Portugal, Spain, France, Algeria
- Neottiura herbigrada (Simon, 1873) — Madeira, Mediterranean, Ukraine, China, Korea
- Neottiura margarita (Yoshida, 1985) — Russia (Far East), China, Korea, Japan
- Neottiura suaveolens (Simon, 1880) — Europe
- Neottiura uncinata (Lucas, 1846) — Mediterranean

=== Nesopholcomma ===
Nesopholcomma Ono, 2010

- Nesopholcomma izuense Ono, 2010 (type) — Japan

=== Nesticodes ===
Nesticodes

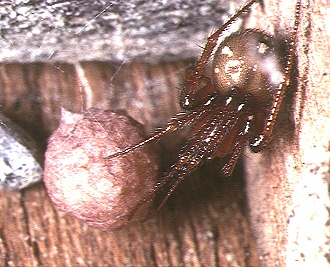
Red house spider
(Nesticodes rufipes)

Nesticodes Archer, 1950

- Nesticodes rufipes (Lucas, 1846) (type) — Central and South America. Introduced to Europe, Macaronesia, North Africa, Middle East, China, Japan, Sri Lanka, Indonesia, New Zealand, Pacific Is.

=== Nihonhimea ===
Nihonhimea Yoshida, 2016

- Nihonhimea japonica (Bösenberg & Strand, 1906) (type) — China, Laos, Taiwan, Korea, Japan
- Nihonhimea mundula (L. Koch, 1872) — Seychelles, India to New Caledonia
  - Nihonhimea mundula papuana (Chrysanthus, 1963) — New Guinea
- Nihonhimea tesselata (Keyserling, 1884) — Mexico to Paraguay. Introduced to Pakistan, New Guinea, Australia (Queensland)

=== Nipponidion ===
Nipponidion

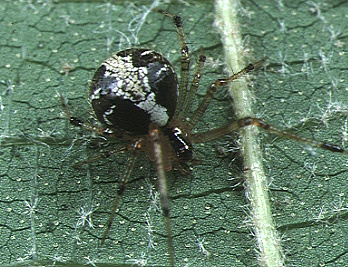
Nipponidion okinawense

Nipponidion Yoshida, 2001

- Nipponidion okinawense Yoshida, 2001 (type) — Japan (Okinawa)
- Nipponidion yaeyamense (Yoshida, 1993) — Japan

=== Nojimaia ===
Nojimaia Yoshida, 2009

- Nojimaia nipponica Yoshida, 2009 (type) — China, Japan

== O ==
=== Ohlertidion ===
Ohlertidion Wunderlich, 2008

- Ohlertidion lundbecki (Sørensen, 1898) — Greenland
- Ohlertidion ohlerti (Thorell, 1870) (type) — North America, Europe, Russia (Europe to Far East)
- Ohlertidion thaleri (Marusik, 1988) — Russia (northeastern Siberia, Far East)

=== Okumaella ===
Okumaella Yoshida, 2009

- Okumaella okumae (Yoshida, 1988) (type) — Japan

== P ==
=== Paidiscura ===
Paidiscura

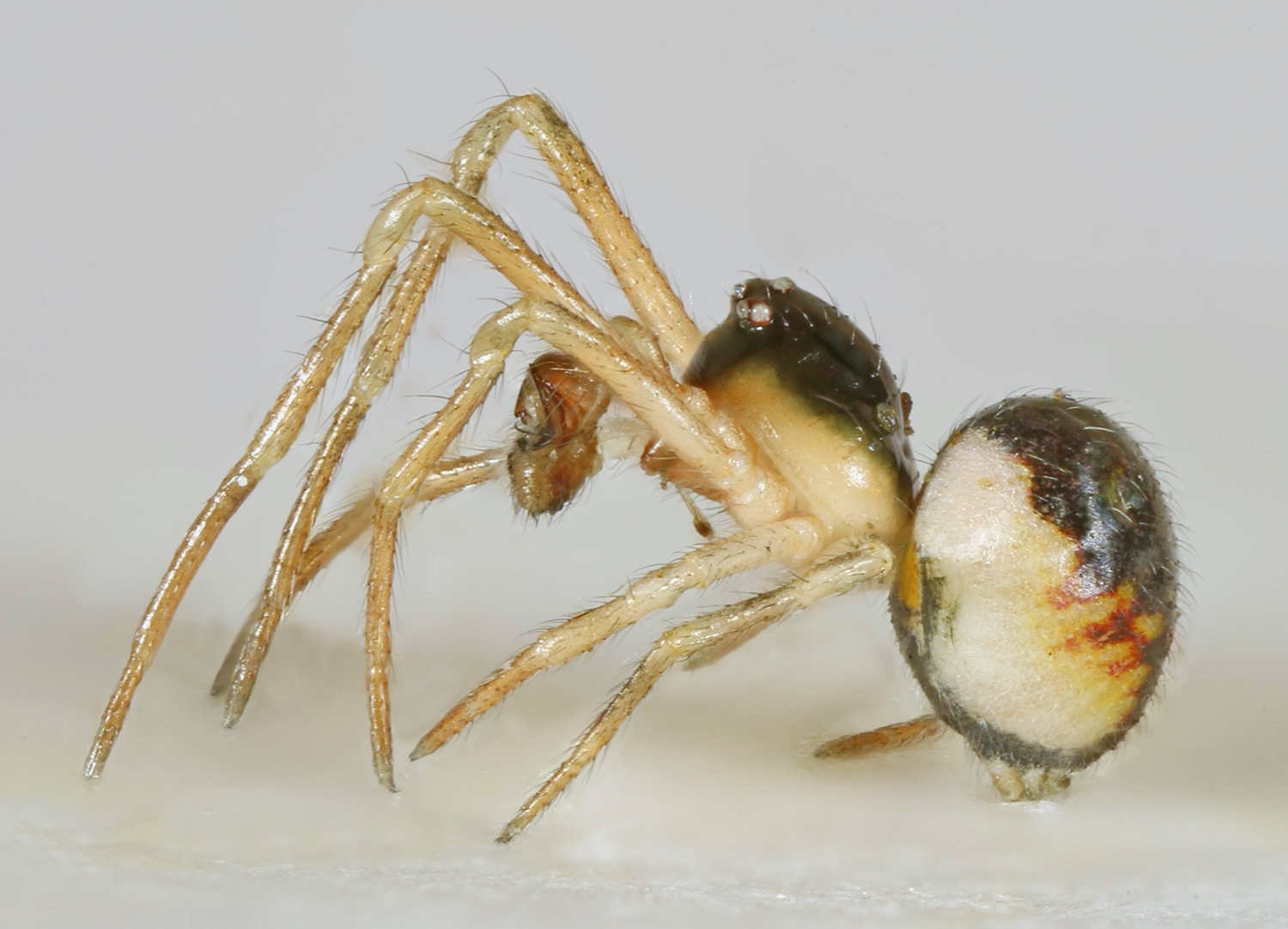
Paidiscura pallens

Paidiscura Archer, 1950

- Paidiscura dromedaria (Simon, 1880) — Cape Verde Is., Spain, France, Italy, Greece, North Africa to Middle East
- Paidiscura orotavensis (Schmidt, 1968) — Canary Is., Madeira
- Paidiscura pallens (Blackwall, 1834) (type) — Europe, Algeria, Turkey, Georgia, Russia (Europe to south Siberia)
- Paidiscura subpallens (Bösenberg & Strand, 1906) — China, Korea, Japan

=== Parasteatoda ===
Parasteatoda

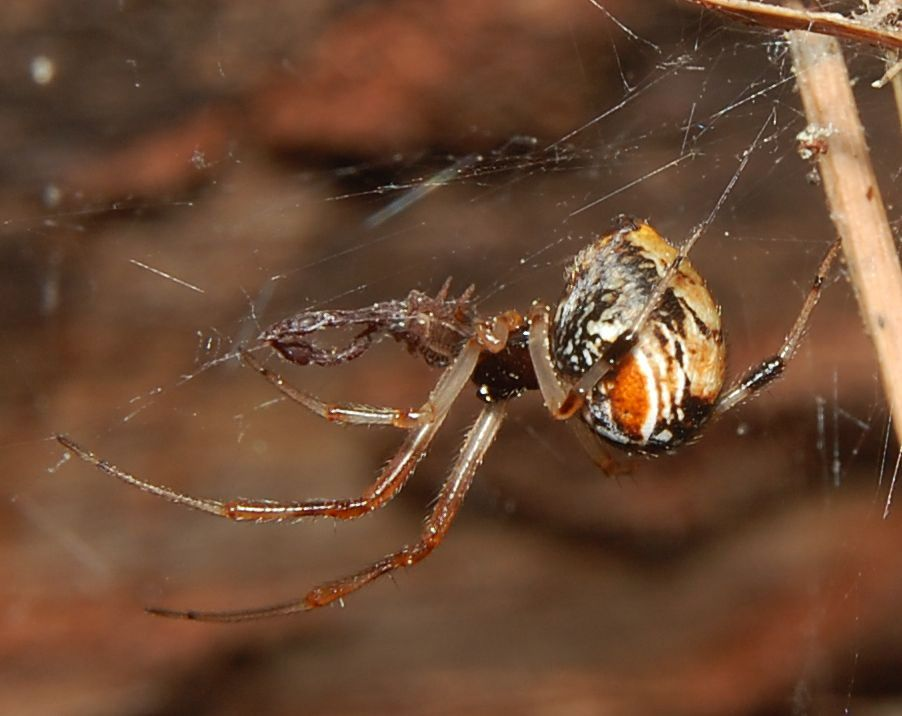
Parasteatoda lunata

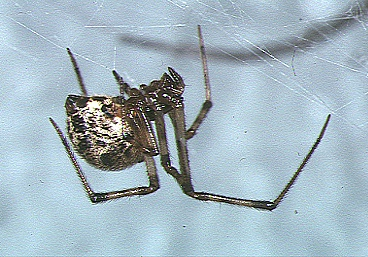
American house spider
(Parasteatoda tepidariorum), female

Parasteatoda Archer, 1946

- Parasteatoda aequipeiformis Yang, Irfan & Peng, 2019 — China
- Parasteatoda angulithorax (Bösenberg & Strand, 1906) — Russia (Far East), China, Korea, Japan
- Parasteatoda asiatica (Bösenberg & Strand, 1906) — China, Korea, Japan
- Parasteatoda brookesiana (Barrion & Litsinger, 1995) — India, Philippines
- Parasteatoda camura (Simon, 1877) — Philippines, New Guinea, Solomon Is.
- Parasteatoda celsabdomina (Zhu, 1998) — India, China, Thailand, Laos
- Parasteatoda cingulata (Zhu, 1998) — China
- Parasteatoda corrugata Yoshida, 2016 — Japan
- Parasteatoda culicivora (Bösenberg & Strand, 1906) — China, Japan
- Parasteatoda daliensis (Zhu, 1998) — China, Laos
- Parasteatoda decorata (L. Koch, 1867) — Indonesia (Krakatau), New Guinea, Australia (Queensland)
- Parasteatoda ducta (Zhu, 1998) — China
- Parasteatoda galeiforma (Zhu, Zhang & Xu, 1991) — China
- Parasteatoda gui (Zhu, 1998) — China
- Parasteatoda hammeni (Chrysanthus, 1963) — New Guinea
- Parasteatoda hatsushibai Yoshida, 2009 — Japan
- Parasteatoda jinghongensis (Zhu, 1998) — China
- Parasteatoda kaindi (Levi, Lubin & Robinson, 1982) — New Guinea
- Parasteatoda kentingensis Yoshida, 2015 — Taiwan
- Parasteatoda kompirensis (Bösenberg & Strand, 1906) — India, China, Korea, Japan
- Parasteatoda lanyuensis (Yoshida, Tso & Severinghaus, 2000) — Taiwan
- Parasteatoda longiducta (Zhu, 1998) — China
- Parasteatoda lunata (Clerck, 1757) — Europe, Turkey, Israel, Caucasus, Russia (Europe to Far East)
  - Parasteatoda lunata serrata (Franganillo, 1930) — Cuba
- Parasteatoda merapiensis Yoshida & Takasuka, 2011 — Indonesia (Java)
- Parasteatoda nigrovittata (Keyserling, 1884) — Mexico to Argentina
- Parasteatoda oxymaculata (Zhu, 1998) — China, India, Laos
- Parasteatoda palmata Gao & Li, 2014 — China
- Parasteatoda polygramma (Kulczyński, 1911) — New Guinea
- Parasteatoda quadrimaculata (Yoshida, Tso & Severinghaus, 2000) — Taiwan
- Parasteatoda ryukyu (Yoshida, 2000) — Japan, Ryukyu Is., Taiwan
- Parasteatoda simulans (Thorell, 1875) — Europe, Turkey, Caucasus, Russia (Europe to south Siberia)
- Parasteatoda songi (Zhu, 1998) — China
- Parasteatoda subtabulata (Zhu, 1998) — China
- Parasteatoda subvexa (Zhu, 1998) — China
- Parasteatoda tabulata (Levi, 1980) — Tropical Asia. Introduced to North America, Europe, Georgia, Russia (Europe to Far East), Central Asia, China, Korea, Japan
- Parasteatoda taiwanica Yoshida, 2015 — Taiwan
- Parasteatoda tepidariorum (C. L. Koch, 1841) (type) — South America. Introduced to Canada, USA, Seychelles, Europe, Turkey, Caucasis, Russia (Europe to Far East), Central Asia, China, Japan, New Zealand, Hawaii
  - Parasteatoda tepidariorum australis (Thorell, 1895) — Myanmar
- Parasteatoda transipora (Zhu & Zhang, 1992) — China
- Parasteatoda triangula (Yoshida, 1993) — Singapore, Indonesia (Java, Bali)
- Parasteatoda valoka (Chrysanthus, 1975) — New Guinea, Papua New Guinea (New Britain)
- Parasteatoda vervoorti (Chrysanthus, 1975) — New Guinea
- Parasteatoda wangi Jin & Zhang, 2013 — China
- Parasteatoda wau (Levi, Lubin & Robinson, 1982) — New Guinea

=== Paratheridula ===
Paratheridula Levi, 1957

- Paratheridula perniciosa (Keyserling, 1886) (type) — USA to Chile

=== Pholcomma ===
Pholcomma Thorell, 1869

- Pholcomma antipodianum (Forster, 1955) — New Zealand (Antipodes Is.)
- Pholcomma barnesi Levi, 1957 — USA
- Pholcomma carota Levi, 1957 — USA
- Pholcomma gibbum (Westring, 1851) (type) — Europe, North Africa, Turkey, Azerbaijan
- Pholcomma hickmani Forster, 1964 — New Zealand (Campbell Is.)
- Pholcomma hirsutum Emerton, 1882 — USA, Canada
- Pholcomma mantinum Levi, 1964 — Brazil
- Pholcomma micropunctatum (Mello-Leitão, 1941) — Argentina
- Pholcomma soloa (Marples, 1955) — Samoa, Niue
- Pholcomma tokyoense Ono, 2007 — Japan
- Pholcomma turbotti (Marples, 1956) — New Zealand

=== Phoroncidia ===
Phoroncidia

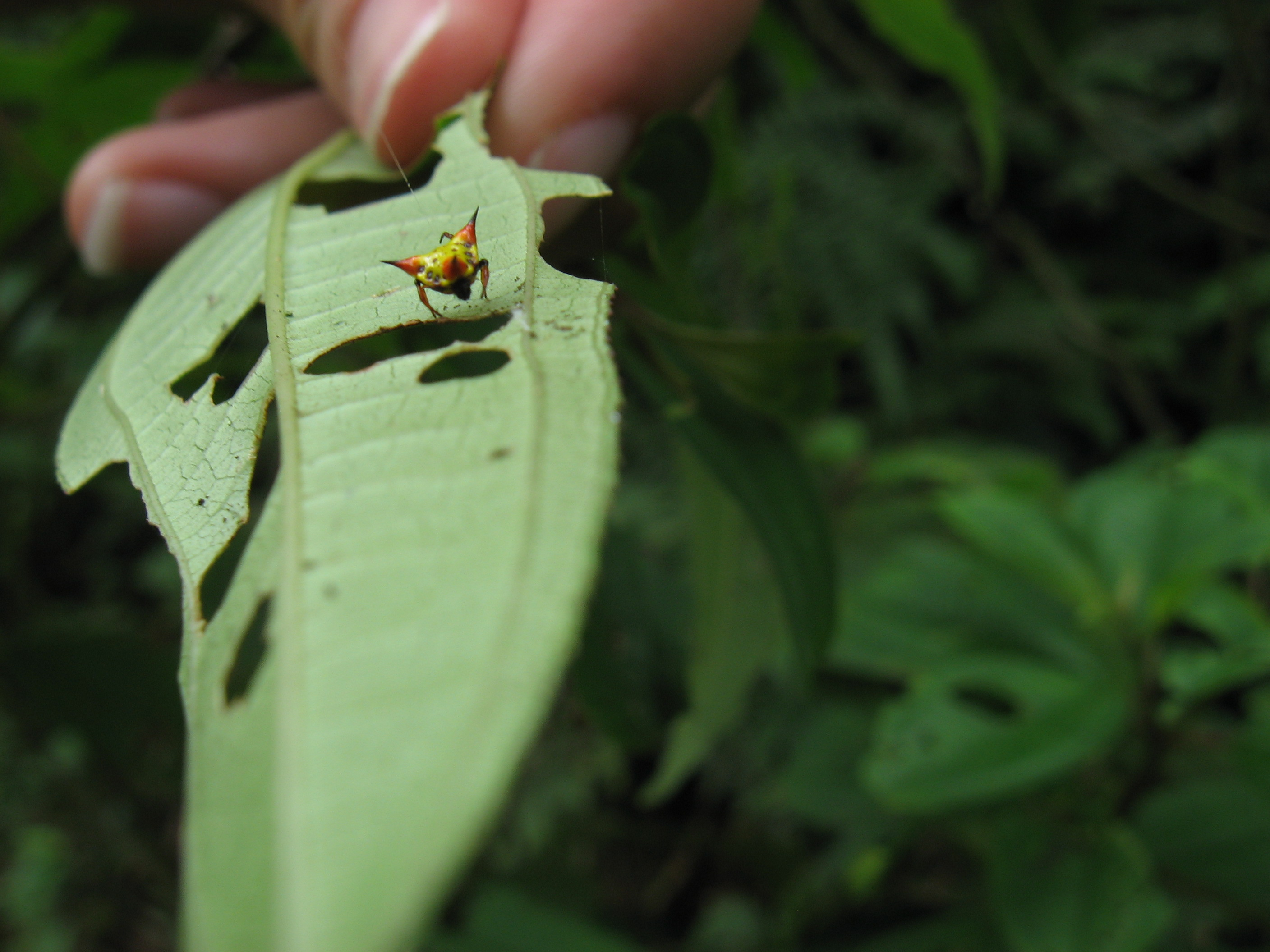
Phoroncidia tricuspidata

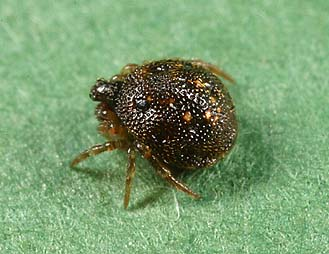
Phoroncidia ryukyuensis, male

Phoroncidia Westwood, 1835

- Phoroncidia aciculata Thorell, 1877 — Indonesia (Sulawesi)
- Phoroncidia aculeata Westwood, 1835 (type) — India, China
- Phoroncidia alishanensis Chen, 1990 — Taiwan
- Phoroncidia altiventris Yoshida, 1985 — Japan
- Phoroncidia alveolata (Simon, 1903) — Equatorial Guinea
- Phoroncidia ambatolahy Kariko, 2014 — Madagascar
- Phoroncidia americana (Emerton, 1882) — USA, Canada, Cuba, Jamaica
- Phoroncidia argoides (Doleschall, 1857) — Indonesia (Ambon)
- Phoroncidia aurata O. Pickard-Cambridge, 1877 — Madagascar
- Phoroncidia bifrons (Simon, 1895) — Philippines
- Phoroncidia biocellata (Simon, 1893) — Brazil
- Phoroncidia bukolana Barrion & Litsinger, 1995 — Philippines
- Phoroncidia capensis (Simon, 1895) — South Africa
- Phoroncidia concave Yin & Xu, 2012 — China
- Phoroncidia coracina (Simon, 1899) — Indonesia (Sumatra)
- Phoroncidia cribrata (Simon, 1893) — Paraguay
- Phoroncidia crustula Zhu, 1998 — China
- Phoroncidia cygnea (Hickman, 1951) — Australia (Tasmania)
- Phoroncidia eburnea (Simon, 1895) — South Africa
- Phoroncidia ellenbergeri Berland, 1913 — Gabon
- Phoroncidia escalerai (Simon, 1903) — Equatorial Guinea
- Phoroncidia flavolimbata (Simon, 1893) — Ecuador
- Phoroncidia floripara Gao & Li, 2014 — China
- Phoroncidia fumosa (Nicolet, 1849) — Chile
- Phoroncidia gayi (Nicolet, 1849) — Chile
- Phoroncidia gira Levi, 1964 — Venezuela
- Phoroncidia hankiewiczi (Kulczyński, 1911) — Portugal, Spain, France
- Phoroncidia hexacantha Thorell, 1890 — Indonesia (Sumatra)
- Phoroncidia jacobsoni (Reimoser, 1925) — Indonesia (Sumatra)
- Phoroncidia kibonotensis (Tullgren, 1910) — East Africa
  - Phoroncidia kibonotensis concolor (Caporiacco, 1949) — Kenya
- Phoroncidia levii Chrysanthus, 1963 — New Guinea
- Phoroncidia longiceps (Keyserling, 1886) — Brazil
- Phoroncidia lygeana (Walckenaer, 1841) — Malaysia, Indonesia (Sumatra, Java, Borneo)
- Phoroncidia maindroni (Simon, 1905) — India
- Phoroncidia minuta (Spassky, 1932) — Georgia, Azerbaijan
- Phoroncidia moyobamba Levi, 1964 — Peru, Brazil
- Phoroncidia musiva (Simon, 1880) — New Caledonia
- Phoroncidia nasuta (O. Pickard-Cambridge, 1873) — Sri Lanka, Taiwan, Japan
- Phoroncidia nicoleti (Roewer, 1942) — Chile
- Phoroncidia nicoleti Levi, 1964 — Chile
- Phoroncidia oahuensis (Simon, 1900) — Hawaii
- Phoroncidia paradoxa (Lucas, 1846) — Southern Europe, North Africa, Turkey
- Phoroncidia pennata (Nicolet, 1849) — Chile
- Phoroncidia personata (L. Koch, 1872) — Samoa, Fiji, Australia (Lord Howe Is.)
- Phoroncidia pilula (Karsch, 1879) — Georgia, Russia (Far East), China, Korea, Japan
- Phoroncidia pilula (Simon, 1895) — Tanzania (Zanzibar)
- Phoroncidia piratini Rodrigues & Marques, 2010 — Brazil
- Phoroncidia pukeiwa (Marples, 1955) — New Zealand
- Phoroncidia puketoru (Marples, 1955) — New Zealand
- Phoroncidia puyehue Levi, 1967 — Chile
- Phoroncidia quadrata (O. Pickard-Cambridge, 1880) — New Zealand
- Phoroncidia quadrispinella Strand, 1907 — Madagascar
- Phoroncidia ravot Levi, 1964 — Venezuela
- Phoroncidia reimoseri Levi, 1964 — Brazil
- Phoroncidia roseleviorum Kariko, 2014 — Madagascar
- Phoroncidia rotunda (Keyserling, 1890) — Australia (Queensland, Lord Howe Is.), Samoa
- Phoroncidia rubens Thorell, 1899 — Cameroon
- Phoroncidia rubroargentea Berland, 1913 — Madagascar
- Phoroncidia rubromaculata (Keyserling, 1886) — Brazil
- Phoroncidia ryukyuensis Yoshida, 1979 — Taiwan, Japan (Ryukyu Is.)
- Phoroncidia saboya Levi, 1964 — Colombia
- Phoroncidia scutellata (Taczanowski, 1879) — Peru
- Phoroncidia scutula (Nicolet, 1849) — Bolivia, Chile
- Phoroncidia septemaculeata O. Pickard-Cambridge, 1873 — India, Sri Lanka
- Phoroncidia sextuberculata (Keyserling, 1890) — Australia (Queensland)
- Phoroncidia sjostedti Tullgren, 1910 — Tanzania
- Phoroncidia spissa (Nicolet, 1849) — Chile
- Phoroncidia splendida Thorell, 1899 — West Africa
- Phoroncidia studo Levi, 1964 — Peru, Brazil
- Phoroncidia testudo (O. Pickard-Cambridge, 1873) — India, Sri Lanka
- Phoroncidia thwaitesi O. Pickard-Cambridge, 1869 — Sri Lanka
- Phoroncidia tina Levi, 1964 — Brazil
- Phoroncidia tricuspidata (Blackwall, 1863) — Brazil
- Phoroncidia trituberculata (Hickman, 1951) — Australia (Tasmania)
- Phoroncidia triunfo Levi, 1964 — Mexico to Costa Rica
- Phoroncidia truncatula (Strand, 1909) — South Africa
- Phoroncidia umbrosa (Nicolet, 1849) — Chile
- Phoroncidia variabilis (Nicolet, 1849) — Chile
- Phoroncidia vatoharanana Kariko, 2014 — Madagascar
- Phoroncidia wrightae Kariko, 2014 — Madagascar

=== Phycosoma ===
Phycosoma

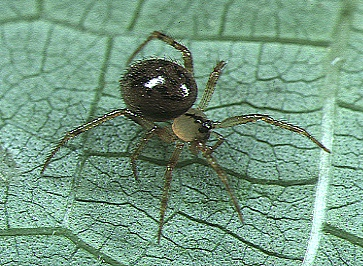
Phycosoma mustelinum, female

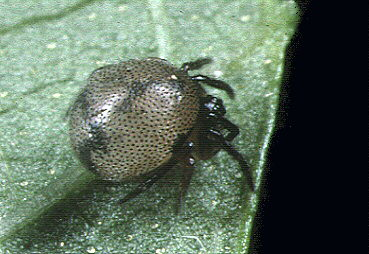
Phycosoma nigromaculatum, female

Phycosoma O. Pickard-Cambridge, 1879

- Phycosoma altum (Keyserling, 1886) — Mexico to Brazil. Introduced to Hawaii
- Phycosoma amamiense (Yoshida, 1985) — Russia (Far East), China, Korea, Japan (mainland, Ryukyu Is.)
- Phycosoma corrugum Gao & Li, 2014 — China
- Phycosoma crenatum Gao & Li, 2014 — China
- Phycosoma diaoluo Zhang & Zhang, 2012 — China
- Phycosoma digitula Zhang & Zhang, 2012 — China
- Phycosoma excisum (Simon, 1889) — Madagascar
- Phycosoma flavomarginatum (Bösenberg & Strand, 1906) — China, Korea, Japan
- Phycosoma hainanensis (Zhu, 1998) — China, Laos
- Phycosoma hana (Zhu, 1998) — China
- Phycosoma inornatum (O. Pickard-Cambridge, 1861) — Europe, Turkey, Azerbaijan
- Phycosoma jamesi (Roberts, 1979) — Jamaica, Panama
- Phycosoma japonicum (Yoshida, 1985) — Korea, Japan
- Phycosoma labialis (Zhu, 1998) — China
- Phycosoma ligulaceum Gao & Li, 2014 — China
- Phycosoma lineatipes (Bryant, 1933) — USA to Brazil
- Phycosoma martinae (Roberts, 1983) — Seychelles, India, China, Korea, Japan (Ryukyu Is.), Philippines
- Phycosoma menustya (Roberts, 1983) — Seychelles
- Phycosoma mustelinum (Simon, 1889) — Russia (Far East), China, Korea, Japan, Indonesia (Krakatau)
- Phycosoma nigromaculatum (Yoshida, 1987) — China, Taiwan, Japan, Ryukyu Is.
- Phycosoma oecobioides O. Pickard-Cambridge, 1880 (type) — New Zealand (mainland, Chatham Is.)
- Phycosoma sinica (Zhu, 1992) — China, Vietnam
- Phycosoma spundana (Roberts, 1978) — Seychelles
- Phycosoma stellaris (Zhu, 1998) — China
- Phycosoma stictum (Zhu, 1992) — China
- Phycosoma stigmosum Yin, 2012 — China

=== Phylloneta ===
Phylloneta

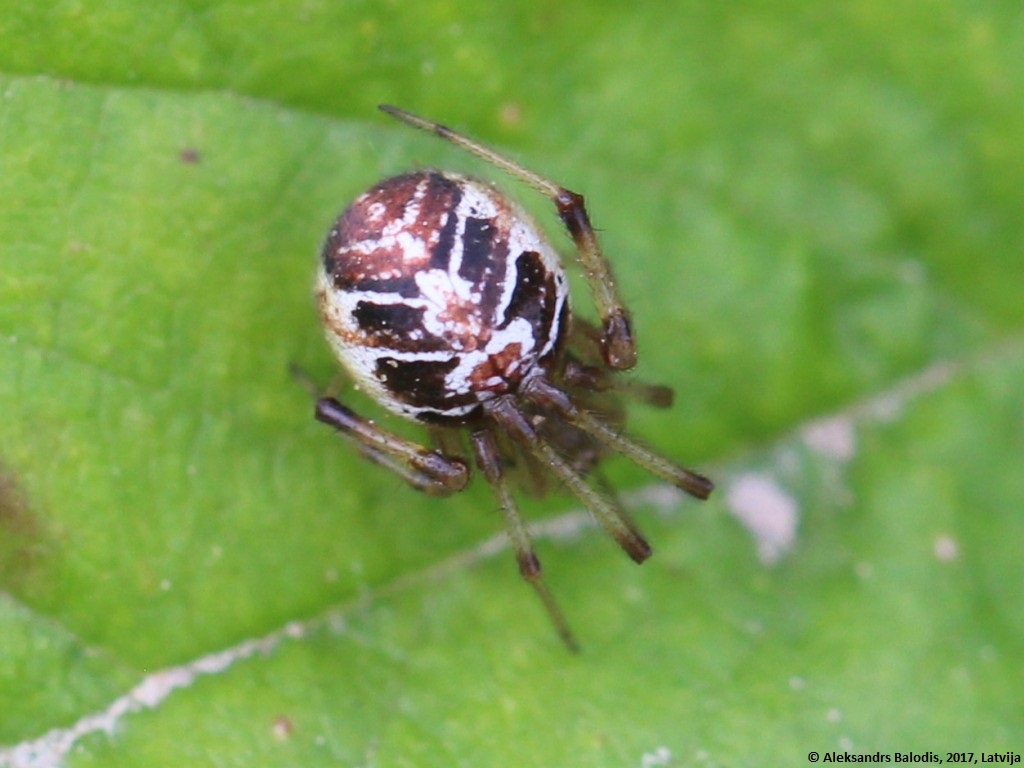
Mothercare spider
(Phylloneta sisyphia)

Phylloneta Archer, 1950

- Phylloneta impressa (L. Koch, 1881) — North America, Europe, Turkey, Caucasus, Russia (Europe to Far East), Kazakhstan, Central Asia, China, India
- Phylloneta pictipes (Keyserling, 1884) (type) — USA
- Phylloneta sisyphia (Clerck, 1757) — Europe, Turkey, Caucasus, Russia (Europe to south Siberia), Kazakhstan, Central Asia, China
  - Phylloneta sisyphia foliifera (Thorell, 1875) — Spain
  - Phylloneta sisyphia torandae (Strand, 1917) — China (Yarkand), Karakorum

=== Platnickina ===
Platnickina

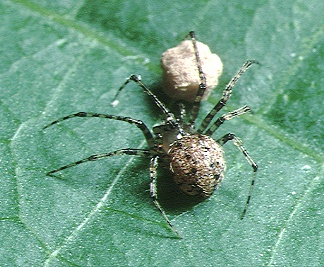
Platnickina maculata, female

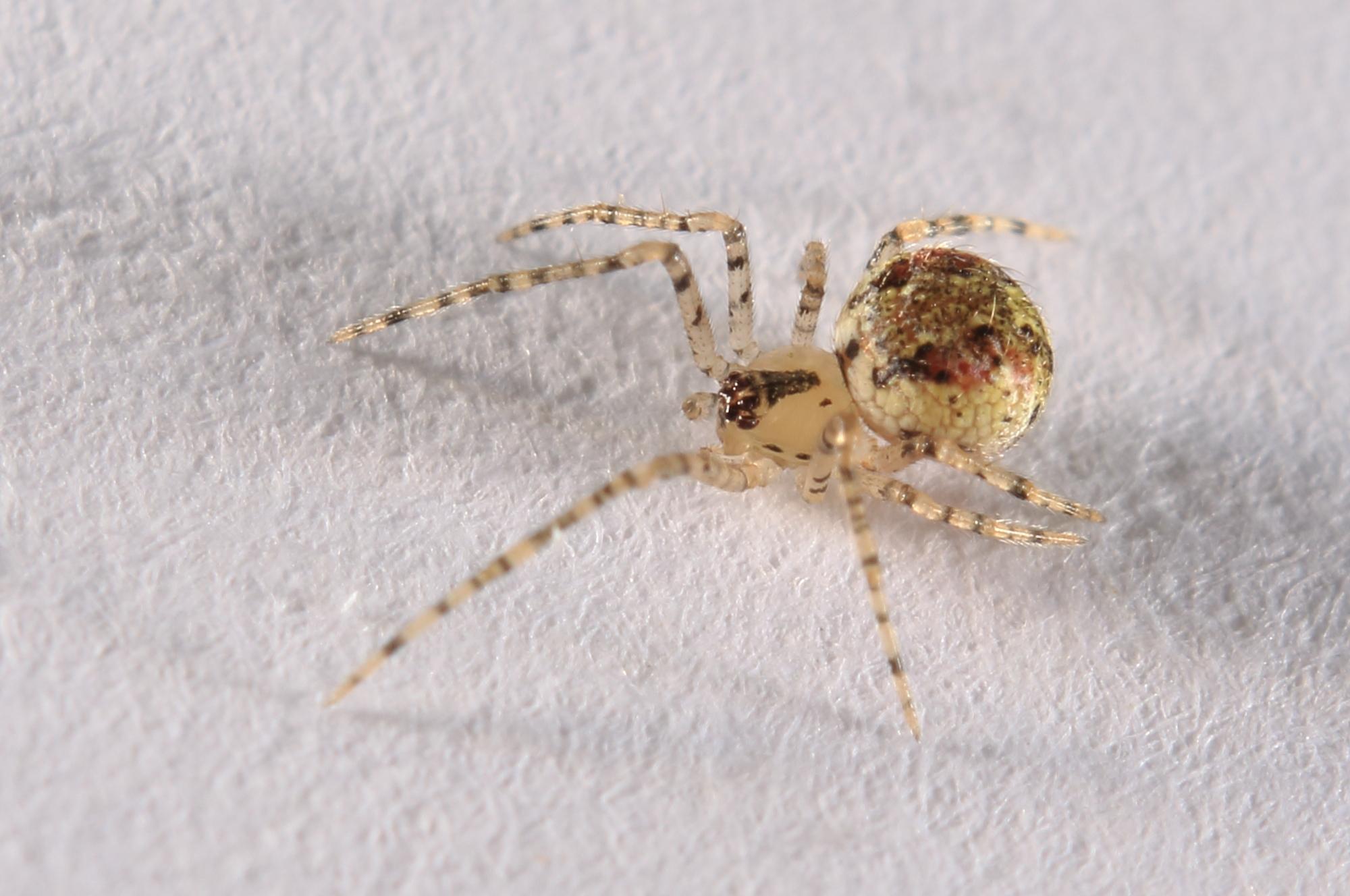
Platnickina tincta

Platnickina Koçak & Kemal, 2008

- Platnickina alabamensis (Gertsch & Archer, 1942) — USA, Canada
- Platnickina antoni (Keyserling, 1884) — USA
- Platnickina fritilla Gao & Li, 2014 — China
- Platnickina kijabei (Berland, 1920) — East Africa
- Platnickina maculata (Yoshida, 2001) (type) — Japan
- Platnickina mneon (Bösenberg & Strand, 1906) — South America. Introduced to Ghana, Seychelles, China, Japan, Pacific Is.
- Platnickina nigropunctata (Lucas, 1846) — Mediterranean
- Platnickina punctosparsa (Emerton, 1882) — USA
- Platnickina qionghaiensis (Zhu, 1998) — China
- Platnickina sterninotata (Bösenberg & Strand, 1906) — Russia (Far East), China, Korea, Japan
- Platnickina tincta (Walckenaer, 1802) — North America, Europe, Turkey, Caucasus, Russia (Europe to south Siberia), Kazakhstan

=== Proboscidula ===
Proboscidula Miller, 1970

- Proboscidula loricata Miller, 1970 (type) — Angola
- Proboscidula milleri Knoflach, 1995 — Rwanda

=== Propostira ===
Propostira Simon, 1894

- Propostira quadrangulata Simon, 1894 (type) — India, Sri Lanka
- Propostira ranii Bhattacharya, 1935 — India

=== Pycnoepisinus ===
Pycnoepisinus Wunderlich, 2008

- Pycnoepisinus kilimandjaroensis Wunderlich, 2008 (type) — Kenya

== R ==
=== Rhomphaea ===
Rhomphaea

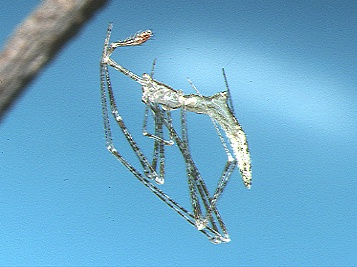
Rhomphaea labiata, male

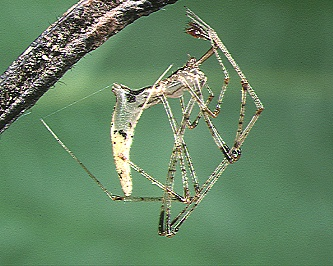
Rhomphaea tanikawai, male

Rhomphaea L. Koch, 1872

- Rhomphaea aculeata Thorell, 1898 — Myanmar
- Rhomphaea affinis Lessert, 1936 — Mozambique
- Rhomphaea altissima Mello-Leitão, 1941 — Brazil
- Rhomphaea angulipalpis Thorell, 1877 — Indonesia (Sulawesi)
- Rhomphaea annulipedis Yoshida & Nojima, 2010 — Japan
- Rhomphaea barycephala (Roberts, 1983) — Seychelles (Aldabra)
- Rhomphaea brasiliensis Mello-Leitão, 1920 — Venezuela, Brazil
- Rhomphaea ceraosus (Zhu & Song, 1991) — China
- Rhomphaea cometes L. Koch, 1872 (type) — New Guinea, Samoa, French Polynesia
- Rhomphaea cona (González & Carmen, 1996) — Argentina
- Rhomphaea fictilium (Hentz, 1850) — Canada to Argentina
- Rhomphaea hyrcana (Logunov & Marusik, 1990) — Georgia, Azerbaijan, China, Japan, Turkey?
- Rhomphaea irrorata Thorell, 1898 — Myanmar
- Rhomphaea labiata (Zhu & Song, 1991) — India, China, Korea, Laos, Japan
- Rhomphaea lactifera Simon, 1909 — Vietnam
- Rhomphaea longicaudata O. Pickard-Cambridge, 1872 — Greece, Lebanon
- Rhomphaea metaltissima Soares & Camargo, 1948 — Panama to Brazil
- Rhomphaea nasica (Simon, 1873) — Canary Is., Portugal, Spain, France, Italy, Croatia, Greece, Africa, St. Helena
- Rhomphaea oris (González & Carmen, 1996) — Argentina
- Rhomphaea ornatissima Dyal, 1935 — Pakistan
- Rhomphaea palmarensis (González & Carmen, 1996) — Argentina
- Rhomphaea paradoxa (Taczanowski, 1873) — St. Vincent, Mexico to Brazil
- Rhomphaea pignalitoensis (González & Carmen, 1996) — Argentina
- Rhomphaea procera (O. Pickard-Cambridge, 1898) — Costa Rica to Argentina
- Rhomphaea projiciens O. Pickard-Cambridge, 1896 — USA to Argentina. Introduced to India
- Rhomphaea recurvata (Saaristo, 1978) — Seychelles
- Rhomphaea rostrata (Simon, 1873) — Canary Is., Portugal, Spain, France, Italy, Bosnia and Herzegovina, Croatia, Greece
- Rhomphaea sagana (Dönitz & Strand, 1906) — Azerbaijan, Russia (Far East), Japan, Philippines
- Rhomphaea sinica (Zhu & Song, 1991) — China
- Rhomphaea sjostedti Tullgren, 1910 — Tanzania
- Rhomphaea tanikawai Yoshida, 2001 — China, Japan
- Rhomphaea urquharti (Bryant, 1933) — New Zealand
- Rhomphaea velhaensis (González & Carmen, 1996) — Brazil

=== Robertus ===
Robertus

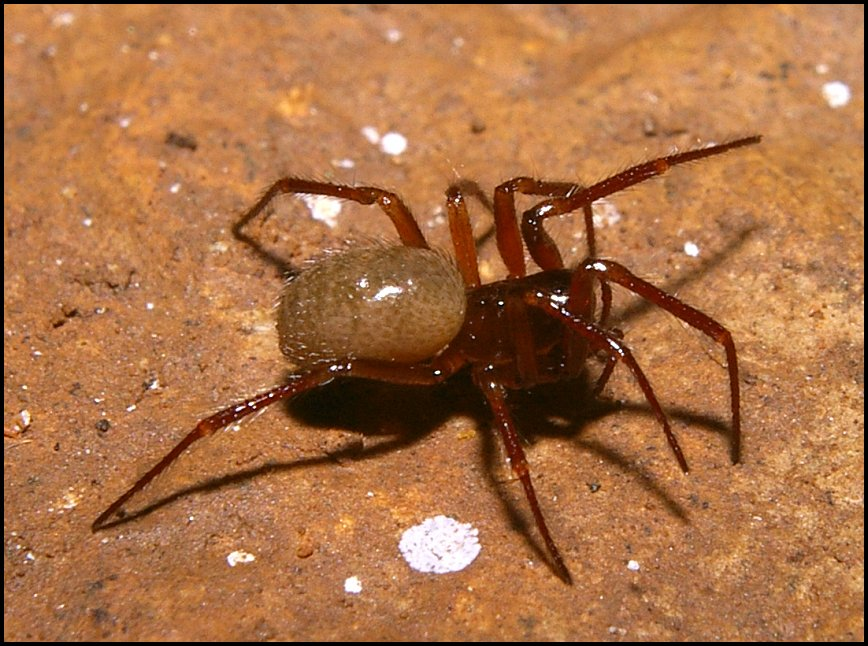
Robertus mazaurici

Robertus O. Pickard-Cambridge, 1879

- Robertus alpinus Dresco, 1959 — Italy
- Robertus arcticus (Chamberlin & Ivie, 1947) — USA (Alaska)
- Robertus arundineti (O. Pickard-Cambridge, 1871) — Europe, Turkey, Caucasus, Russia (Europe to south Siberia), Kazakhstan, Central Asia, China
- Robertus banksi (Kaston, 1946) — USA, Canada
- Robertus borealis (Kaston, 1946) — USA, Canada
- Robertus brachati Wunderlich, 2011 — Turkey
- Robertus calidus Knoflach, 1995 — Congo
- Robertus cantabricus Fage, 1931 — Spain
- Robertus cardesensis Dresco, 1959 — Spain
- Robertus crosbyi (Kaston, 1946) — USA, Canada
- Robertus emeishanensis Zhu, 1998 — China
- Robertus eremophilus Chamberlin, 1928 — USA
- Robertus floridensis (Kaston, 1946) — USA
- Robertus frivaldszkyi (Chyzer, 1894) — Central and southeastern Europe
- Robertus frontatus (Banks, 1892) — USA, Canada
- Robertus fuscus (Emerton, 1894) — USA, Canada, Greenland
- Robertus golovatchi Eskov, 1987 — Georgia
- Robertus heydemanni Wiehle, 1965 — Sweden, Germany, Austria, Italy, Romania, Ukraine, Russia (Europe to west Siberia), Kazakhstan
- Robertus insignis O. Pickard-Cambridge, 1908 — Europe
- Robertus kastoni Eskov, 1987 — Russia (middle Siberia to Far East), Japan
- Robertus kuehnae Bauchhenss & Uhlenhaut, 1993 — Belgium, Switzerland, Germany, Austria
- Robertus laticeps (Keyserling, 1884) — USA
- Robertus lividus (Blackwall, 1836) — USA (Alaska), Europe, Caucasus, Russia (Europe to Far Est)
- Robertus longipalpus (Kaston, 1946) — USA, Canada
- Robertus lyrifer Holm, 1939 — Iceland, Scandinavia, Austria, Russia (Europe to Far East), Canada
- Robertus mazaurici (Simon, 1901) — France
- Robertus mediterraneus Eskov, 1987 — Mediterranean, Switzerland, Austria, Eastern Europe, Caucasus
- Robertus monticola Simon, 1914 — France
- Robertus naejangensis Seo, 2005 — Korea
- Robertus neglectus (O. Pickard-Cambridge, 1871) (type) — Europe, Russia (Europe to south Siberia), Kazakhstan
- Robertus nipponicus Yoshida, 1995 — Japan
- Robertus nojimai Yoshida, 2002 — Japan
- Robertus ogatai Yoshida, 1995 — Japan
- Robertus potanini Schenkel, 1963 — China
- Robertus pumilus (Emerton, 1909) — USA
- Robertus riparius (Keyserling, 1886) — USA, Canada
- Robertus saitoi Yoshida, 1995 — Japan
- Robertus scoticus Jackson, 1914 — Europe, Caucasus, Russia (Europe to middle Siberia)
- Robertus sibiricus Eskov, 1987 — Russia (middle Siberia to Far East), Japan
- Robertus similis (Kaston, 1946) — USA
- Robertus spinifer (Emerton, 1909) — USA
- Robertus subtilis Seo, 2015 — Korea
- Robertus truncorum (L. Koch, 1872) — France to Ukraine
- Robertus ungulatus Vogelsanger, 1944 — Europe, Russia (south Siberia to Far East), China
- Robertus ussuricus Eskov, 1987 — Russia (Far East)
- Robertus vigerens (Chamberlin & Ivie, 1933) — USA, Canada

=== Ruborridion ===
Ruborridion Wunderlich, 2011

- Ruborridion musivum (Simon, 1873) (type) — Mediterranean, India

=== Rugathodes ===
Rugathodes

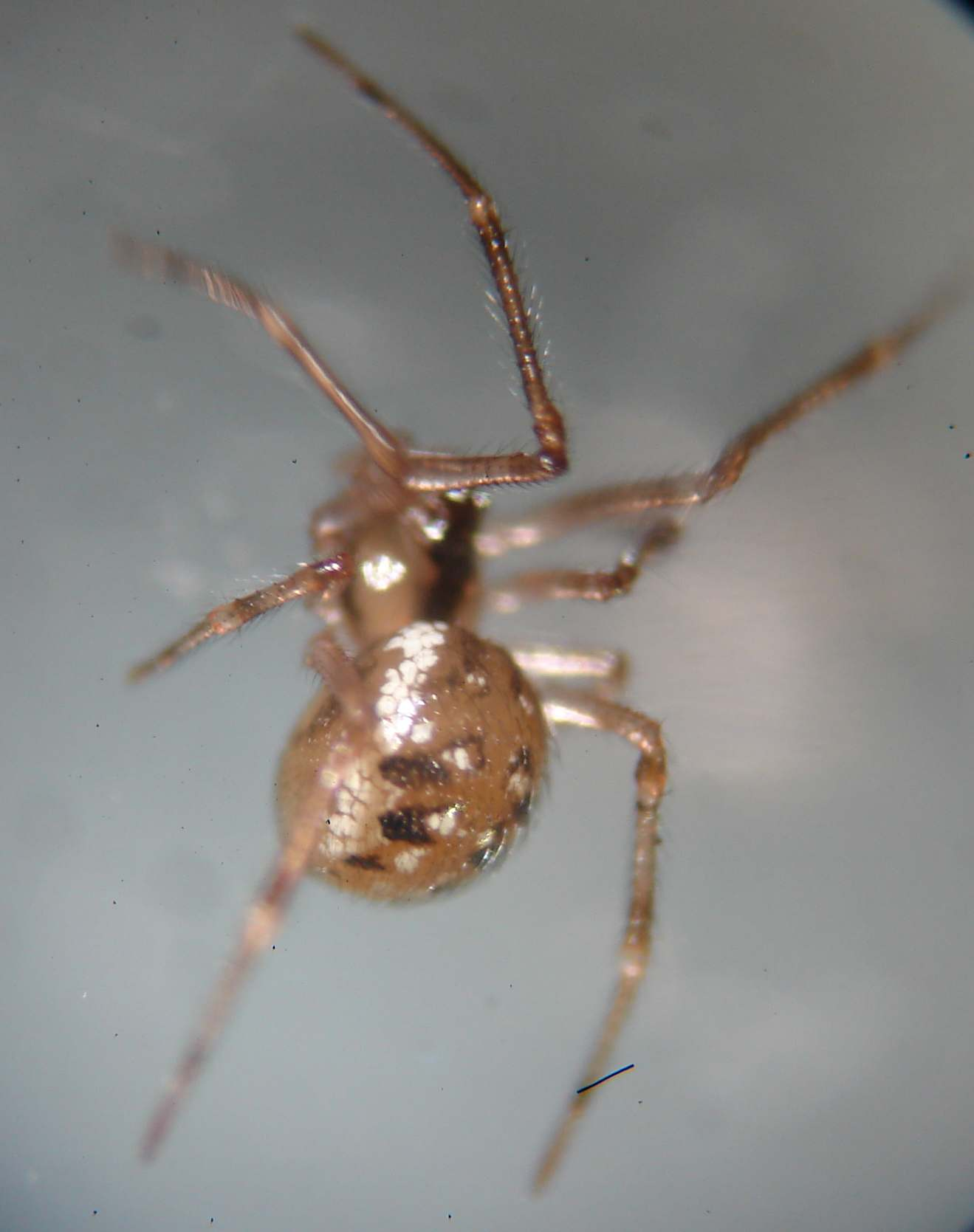
Rugathodes sexpunctatus, female

Rugathodes Archer, 1950

- Rugathodes acoreensis Wunderlich, 1992 — Azores
- Rugathodes aurantius (Emerton, 1915) — North America, Russia (Europe to Far East), Kazakhstan
- Rugathodes bellicosus (Simon, 1873) — Europe, Russia (Europe to south Siberia)
- Rugathodes instabilis (O. Pickard-Cambridge, 1871) — Europe, Russia (Europe to west Siberia)
- Rugathodes madeirensis Wunderlich, 1987 — Madeira
- Rugathodes nigrolimbatus (Yaginuma, 1972) — Japan
- Rugathodes pico (Merrett & Ashmole, 1989) — Azores
- Rugathodes sexpunctatus (Emerton, 1882) (type) — USA, Canada, Russia (Commander Is.). Introduced to Britain

== S ==
=== Sardinidion ===
Sardinidion Wunderlich, 1995

- Sardinidion blackwalli (O. Pickard-Cambridge, 1871) (type) — Europe, North Africa

=== Selkirkiella ===
Selkirkiella Berland, 1924

- Selkirkiella alboguttata Berland, 1924 (type) — Chile (Juan Fernandez Is.)
- Selkirkiella carelmapuensis (Levi, 1963) — Chile
- Selkirkiella luisi (Levi, 1967) — Chile
- Selkirkiella magallanes (Levi, 1963) — Chile
- Selkirkiella michaelseni (Simon, 1902) — Chile
- Selkirkiella purpurea (Nicolet, 1849) — Chile
- Selkirkiella ventrosa (Nicolet, 1849) — Chile, Argentina, Falkland Is.
- Selkirkiella wellingtoni (Levi, 1967) — Chile

=== Sesato ===
Sesato Saaristo, 2006

- Sesato setosa Saaristo, 2006 (type) — Seychelles

=== Seycellesa ===
Seycellesa Koçak & Kemal, 2008

- Seycellesa braueri (Simon, 1898) (type) — Seychelles

=== Simitidion ===
Simitidion Wunderlich, 1992

- Simitidion agaricographum (Levy & Amitai, 1982) — Tunisia, Greece (mainland, Crete), Turkey, Cyprus, Israel
- Simitidion lacuna Wunderlich, 1992 — Canary Is., Spain, North Africa, Israel
- Simitidion simile (C. L. Koch, 1836) (type) — Canada, Europe, North Africa, Turkey, Israel, Caucasus, Central Asia

=== Spheropistha ===
Spheropistha

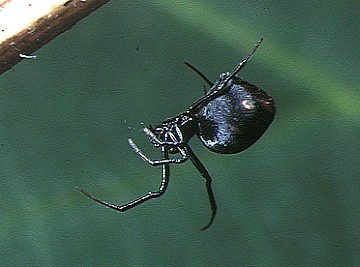
Spheropistha melanosoma

Spheropistha Yaginuma, 1957

- Spheropistha huangsangensis (Yin, Peng & Bao, 2004) — China
- Spheropistha melanosoma Yaginuma, 1957 (type) — Japan, Korea?
- Spheropistha miyashitai (Tanikawa, 1998) — Japan
- Spheropistha nigroris (Yoshida, Tso & Severinghaus, 2000) — Taiwan
- Spheropistha orbita (Zhu, 1998) — China
- Spheropistha rhomboides (Yin, Peng & Bao, 2004) — China
- Spheropistha xinhua Barrion, Barrion-Dupo & Heong, 2013 — China

=== Spinembolia ===
Spinembolia Saaristo, 2006

- Spinembolia clabnum (Roberts, 1978) (type) — Seychelles

=== Spintharus ===
Spintharus

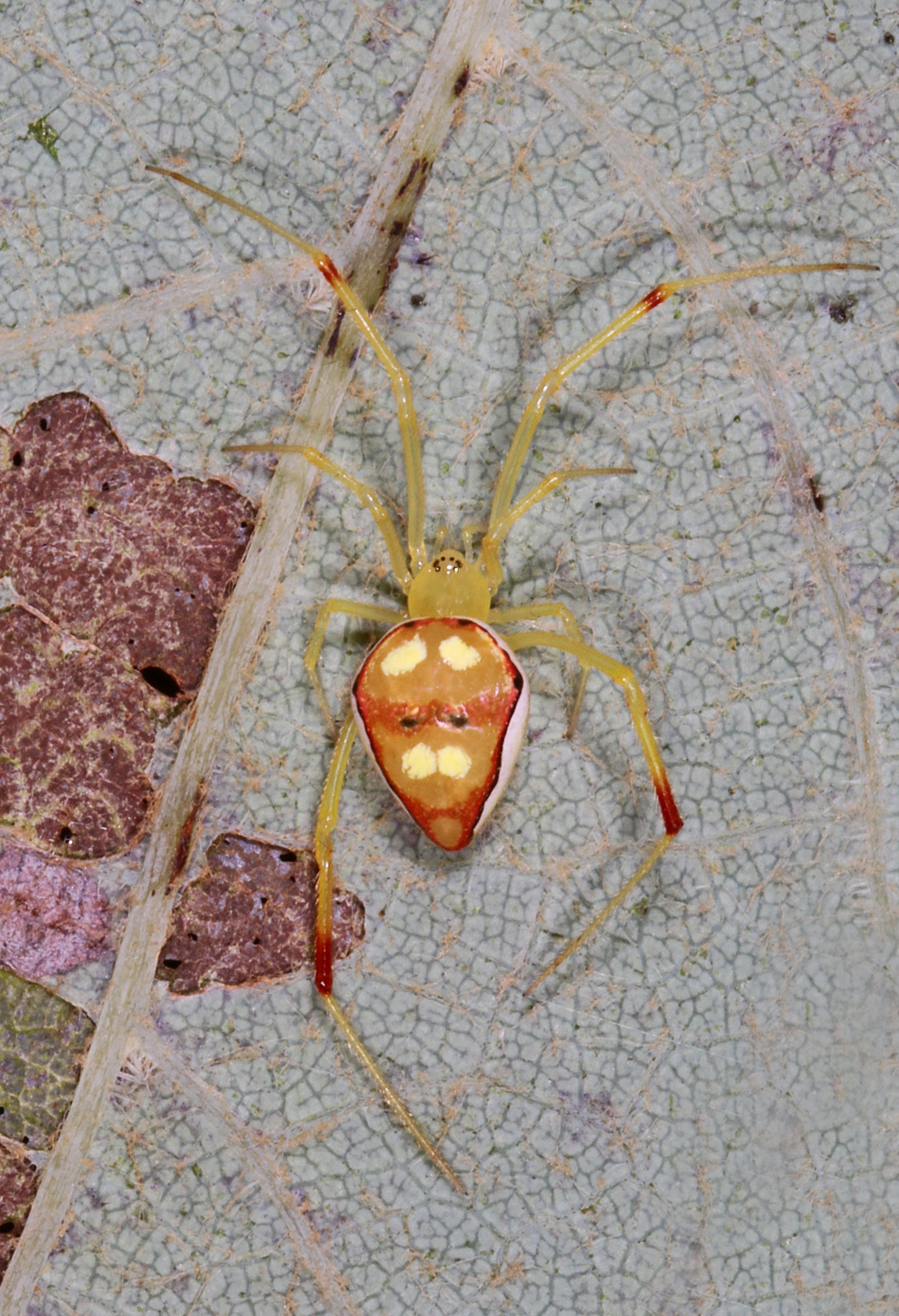
Spintharus flavidus

Spintharus Hentz, 1850

- Spintharus argenteus Dyal, 1935 — Pakistan
- Spintharus barackobamai Agnarsson & Van Patten, 2018 — Cuba
- Spintharus berniesandersi Agnarsson & Sargeant, 2018 — Cuba
- Spintharus davidattenboroughi Agnarsson & Van Patten, 2018 — Jamaica
- Spintharus davidbowiei Agnarsson & Chomitz, 2018 — Mexico
- Spintharus dayleae Sargeant & Agnarsson, 2018 — Saint Lucia, Grenada
- Spintharus flavidus Hentz, 1850 (type) — USA; Central and South America: misidentified
- Spintharus frosti Van Patten & Agnarsson, 2018 — Dominican Rep.
- Spintharus giraldoalayoni Agnarsson & Chomitz, 2018 — Cuba
- Spintharus goodbreadae Chomitz & Agnarsson, 2018 — Cuba
- Spintharus gracilis Keyserling, 1886 — Brazil
- Spintharus greerae Sargeant & Agnarsson, 2018 — Mexico
- Spintharus jesselaueri Sargeant & Agnarsson, 2018 — Dominica
- Spintharus leonardodicaprioi Van Patten & Agnarsson, 2018 — Dominican Rep.
- Spintharus manrayi Chomitz & Agnarsson, 2018 — Cuba
- Spintharus michelleobamaae Agnarsson & Sargeant, 2018 — Cuba
- Spintharus rallorum Chomitz & Agnarsson, 2018 — Jamaica, Saint Kitts and Nevis
- Spintharus skelly Van Patten & Agnarsson, 2018 — Dominican Rep.

=== Steatoda ===
Steatoda

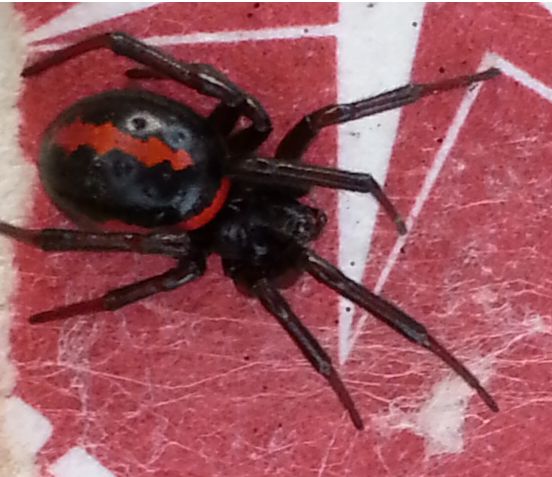
Steatoda paykulliana

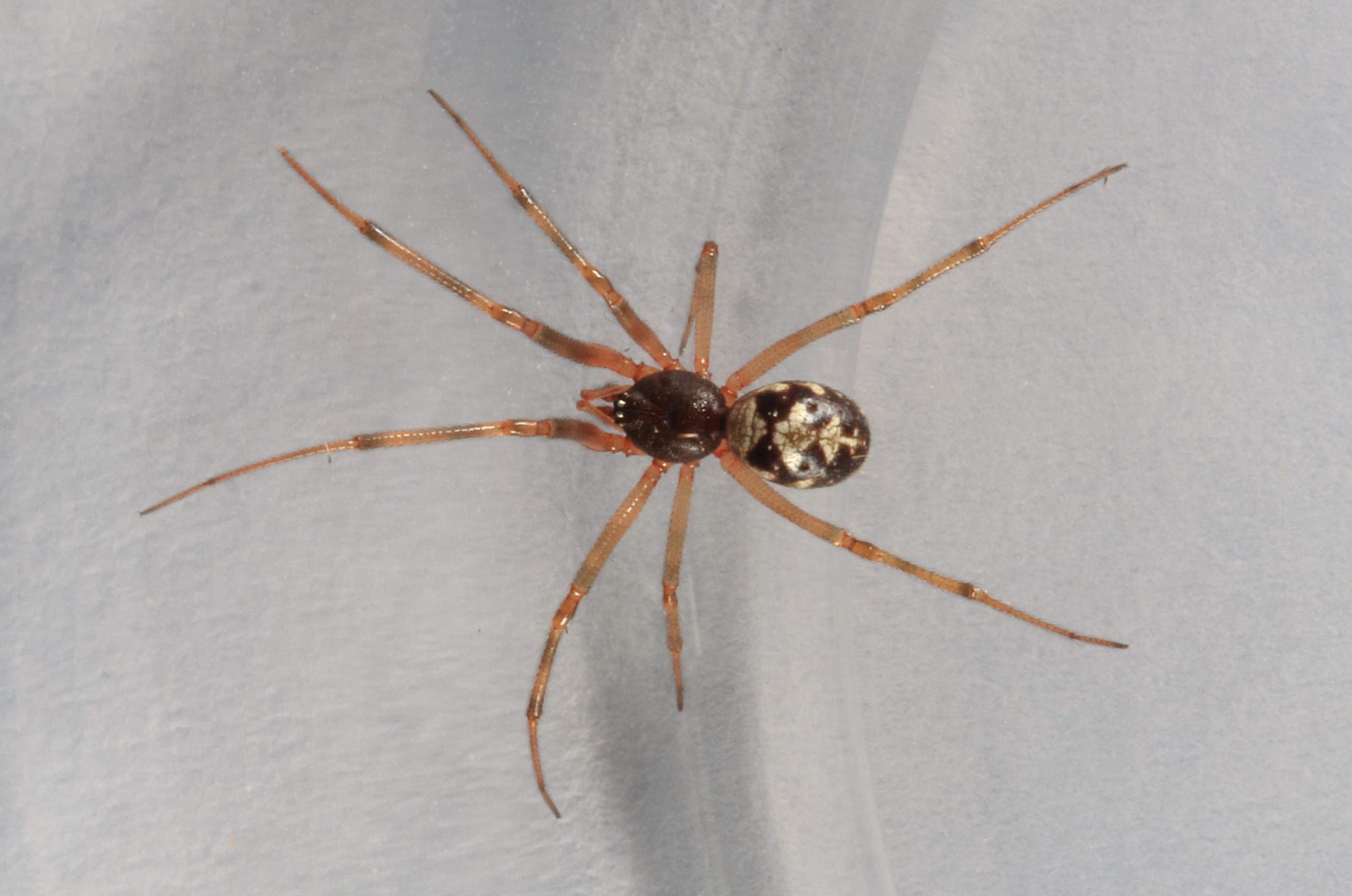
Triangulate cobweb spider
(Steatoda triangulosa)

Steatoda Sundevall, 1833

- Steatoda adumbrata (Simon, 1908) — Australia (Western Australia)
- Steatoda aethiopica (Simon, 1909) — Central Africa
- Steatoda alamosa Gertsch, 1960 — USA, Mexico
- Steatoda alboclathrata (Simon, 1897) — India
- Steatoda albomaculata (De Geer, 1778) — North America, Europe, North Africa to Israel, Russia (Europe to Far East), Central Asia, China, Korea, Japan
  - Steatoda albomaculata infuscata (Schenkel, 1925) — Switzerland
- Steatoda ancora (Grube, 1861) — Russia (south Siberia)
- Steatoda ancorata (Holmberg, 1876) — Mexico to Chile
- Steatoda andina (Keyserling, 1884) — Venezuela to Chile
- Steatoda apacheana Gertsch, 1960 — USA
- Steatoda atascadera Chamberlin & Ivie, 1942 — USA
- Steatoda atrocyanea (Simon, 1880) — New Caledonia, Loyalty Is.
- Steatoda autumnalis (Banks, 1898) — Mexico
- Steatoda badia (Roewer, 1961) — Senegal
- Steatoda bertkaui (Thorell, 1881) — Indonesia (Moluccas), New Guinea
- Steatoda bipunctata (Linnaeus, 1758) — Europe, Turkey, Caucasus, Russia (Europe to Far East), Iran, Central Asia, China. Introduced to South America
- Steatoda borealis (Hentz, 1850) — USA, Canada
- Steatoda bradyi (Strand, 1907) — South Africa
- Steatoda capensis Hann, 1990 — South Africa, Lesotho. Introduced to St. Helena, Australia, New Zealand
- Steatoda carbonaria (Simon, 1907) — Congo, Equatorial Guinea (Bioko)
  - Steatoda carbonaria minor (Simon, 1907) — Congo
- Steatoda caspia Ponomarev, 2007 — Kazakhstan
- Steatoda castanea (Clerck, 1757) (type) — Europe, Turkey, Russia (Europe to Far East), Caucasus, Iran, Central Asia, China. Introduced to Canada
- Steatoda chinchipe Levi, 1962 — Ecuador, Peru
- Steatoda cingulata (Thorell, 1890) — China, India, Korea, Vietnam, Laos, Japan, Indonesia (Sumatra, Java)
- Steatoda connexa (O. Pickard-Cambridge, 1904) — South Africa
- Steatoda craniformis Zhu & Song, 1992 — China
- Steatoda dahli (Nosek, 1905) — Turkey, Israel, Caucasus, Russia (Europe) to Central Asia
- Steatoda diamantina Levi, 1962 — Brazil
- Steatoda distincta (Blackwall, 1859) — Madeira
- Steatoda ephippiata (Thorell, 1875) — Algeria to Israel, Iran
- Steatoda erigoniformis (O. Pickard-Cambridge, 1872) — East Mediterranean to Middle East, Caucasus, China, Korea, Japan. Introduced to the Caribbean.
- Steatoda fagei (Lawrence, 1964) — South Africa
- Steatoda fallax (Blackwall, 1865) — Cape Verde Is.
- Steatoda felina (Simon, 1907) — Congo
- Steatoda foravae Dippenaar-Schoeman & Müller, 1992 — South Africa
- Steatoda grandis Banks, 1901 — USA
- Steatoda grossa (C. L. Koch, 1838) — Europe, Turkey, Caucasus, Russia (Europe to Far East), Central Asia, China, Korea, Japan. Introduced to North America, Ecuador, Peru, Chile, Hawaii Is., Macaronesia, Algeria
  - Steatoda grossa strandi (Ermolajev, 1934) — Russia (west Siberia)
- Steatoda gui Zhu, 1998 — China
- Steatoda hespera Chamberlin & Ivie, 1933 — USA, Canada
- Steatoda hui Zhu, 1998 — China
- Steatoda iheringi (Keyserling, 1886) — Brazil, Paraguay, Argentina
- Steatoda incomposita (Denis, 1957) — Portugal, Spain, France (incl. Corsica)
- Steatoda kiwuensis (Strand, 1913) — Central Africa
- Steatoda kuytunensis Zhu, 1998 — China
- Steatoda latifasciata (Simon, 1873) — Canary Is. to Israel
- Steatoda lawrencei Brignoli, 1983 — South Africa
- Steatoda lenzi (Strand, 1907) — South Africa
- Steatoda leonardi (Thorell, 1898) — Myanmar
- Steatoda lepida (O. Pickard-Cambridge, 1880) — New Zealand
- Steatoda linzhiensis Hu, 2001 — China
- Steatoda livens (Simon, 1894) — Australia (Tasmania)
- Steatoda longurio (Simon, 1909) — Central Africa
- Steatoda mainlingensis (Hu & Li, 1987) — Kyrgyzstan, China
- Steatoda mainlingoides Yin, Griswold, Bao & Xu, 2003 — China
- Steatoda marmorata (Simon, 1910) — South Africa
- Steatoda marta Levi, 1962 — Colombia
- Steatoda maura (Simon, 1909) — Mediterranean
- Steatoda mexicana Levi, 1957 — USA, Mexico
- Steatoda micans (Hogg, 1922) — Vietnam
- Steatoda minima (Denis, 1955) — Niger
- Steatoda moerens (Thorell, 1875) — Algeria, Tunisia
- Steatoda moesta (O. Pickard-Cambridge, 1896) — Mexico to Brazil
- Steatoda morsitans (O. Pickard-Cambridge, 1885) — South Africa
- Steatoda nahuana Gertsch, 1960 — Mexico
- Steatoda nasata (Chrysanthus, 1975) — Indonesia (Krakatau), Papua New Guinea (New Ireland), Australia
- Steatoda ngipina Barrion & Litsinger, 1995 — Philippines
- Steatoda nigrimaculata Zhang, Chen & Zhu, 2001 — China
- Steatoda nigrocincta O. Pickard-Cambridge, 1885 — China (Yarkand)
- Steatoda niveosignata (Simon, 1908) — Australia (Western Australia)
- Steatoda nobilis (Thorell, 1875) — Macaronesia. Introduced to USA, Chile, Ecuador, Colombia, Europe, Turkey, Iran
- Steatoda octonotata (Simon, 1908) — Australia (Western Australia)
- Steatoda palomara Chamberlin & Ivie, 1935 — USA
- Steatoda panja Barrion, Barrion-Dupo & Heong, 2013 — China
- Steatoda pardalia Yin, Griswold, Bao & Xu, 2003 — China
- Steatoda paykulliana (Walckenaer, 1806) — Europe, Mediterranean to Central Asia
  - Steatoda paykulliana obsoleta (Strand, 1908) — Ethiopia
- Steatoda pengyangensis Hu & Zhang, 2012 — China
- Steatoda perakensis Simon, 1901 — Malaysia
- Steatoda perspicillata (Thorell, 1898) — Myanmar
- Steatoda picea (Thorell, 1899) — Cameroon
- Steatoda porteri (Simon, 1900) — Chile
- Steatoda punctulata (Marx, 1898) — USA, Mexico
- Steatoda quadrimaculata (O. Pickard-Cambridge, 1896) — USA to Venezuela, Caribbean
- Steatoda quaesita (O. Pickard-Cambridge, 1896) — Mexico
- Steatoda quinquenotata (Blackwall, 1865) — Cape Verde Is.
- Steatoda retorta González, 1987 — Argentina
- Steatoda rhombifera (Grube, 1861) — Russia (middle Siberia)
- Steatoda rubrocalceolata (Simon, 1907) — Equatorial Guinea (Bioko)
- Steatoda rufoannulata (Simon, 1899) — India, Sri Lanka, Sumatra, Java
- Steatoda sabulosa (Tullgren, 1901) — Bolivia, Argentina, Chile
- Steatoda sagax (Blackwall, 1865) — Cape Verde Is.
- Steatoda saltensis Levi, 1957 — Mexico
- Steatoda seriata (Simon, 1899) — Indonesia (Sumatra)
- Steatoda singoides (Tullgren, 1910) — Tanzania
- Steatoda sordidata O. Pickard-Cambridge, 1885 — China (Yarkand)
- Steatoda speciosa (Thorell, 1898) — Myanmar
- Steatoda spina Gao & Li, 2014 — China
- Steatoda subannulata (Kulczyński, 1911) — New Guinea, Papua New Guinea (New Britain)
- Steatoda terastiosa Zhu, 1998 — China
- Steatoda terebrui Gao & Li, 2014 — China
- Steatoda tigrina (Tullgren, 1910) — Tanzania
- Steatoda tortoisea Yin, Griswold, Bao & Xu, 2003 — China
- Steatoda transversa (Banks, 1898) — USA, Mexico
- Steatoda trianguloides Levy, 1991 — France (Corsica), Israel
- Steatoda triangulosa (Walckenaer, 1802) — Europe, Turkey, Caucasus, Russia (Europe to Far East), Central Asia. Introduced to Canada, USA, Canary Is.
  - Steatoda triangulosa concolor (Caporiacco, 1933) — Libya
- Steatoda tristis (Tullgren, 1910) — Tanzania
  - Steatoda tristis ruwenzorica (Strand, 1913) — Uganda
- Steatoda truncata (Urquhart, 1888) — New Zealand
- Steatoda ulleungensis Paik, 1995 — Korea
- Steatoda uncata Zhang, Chen & Zhu, 2001 — China
- Steatoda variabilis (Berland, 1920) — East Africa
- Steatoda variata Gertsch, 1960 — USA, Mexico
  - Steatoda variata china Gertsch, 1960 — USA, Mexico
- Steatoda variipes (Keyserling, 1884) — Peru
- Steatoda vaulogeri (Simon, 1909) — Vietnam
- Steatoda venator (Audouin, 1826) — Libya, Egypt
- Steatoda violacea (Strand, 1906) — Ethiopia
- Steatoda wangi Zhu, 1998 — China
- Steatoda wanshou Yin, 2012 — China
- Steatoda washona Gertsch, 1960 — USA, Mexico
- Steatoda xerophila Levy & Amitai, 1982 — Israel
- Steatoda xishuiensis Zhang, Chen & Zhu, 2001 — China

=== Stemmops ===
Stemmops

Stemmops questus, male

Stemmops mellus, female

Stemmops O. Pickard-Cambridge, 1894

- Stemmops belavista Marques & Buckup, 1996 — Brazil
- Stemmops bicolor O. Pickard-Cambridge, 1894 (type) — USA to Panama, Cuba, Bahama Is.
- Stemmops cambridgei Levi, 1955 — Mexico, Honduras
- Stemmops carajas Santanna & Rodrigues, 2018 — Brazil
- Stemmops caranavi Marques & Buckup, 1996 — Bolivia
- Stemmops carauari Santanna & Rodrigues, 2018 — Brazil
- Stemmops carius Marques & Buckup, 1996 — Brazil
- Stemmops concolor Simon, 1898 — St. Vincent
- Stemmops cryptus Levi, 1955 — Panama
- Stemmops forcipus Zhu, 1998 — China, Laos
- Stemmops guapiacu Santanna & Rodrigues, 2018 — Brazil
- Stemmops lina Levi, 1955 — Mexico
- Stemmops mellus Levi, 1964 — Panama
- Stemmops murici Santanna & Rodrigues, 2018 — Brazil
- Stemmops nigrabdomenus Zhu, 1998 — China, Laos
- Stemmops nipponicus Yaginuma, 1969 — Russia (Far East), China, Korea, Japan
- Stemmops ornatus (Bryant, 1933) — USA
- Stemmops orsus Levi, 1964 — Panama, Brazil
- Stemmops osorno (Levi, 1963) — Chile
- Stemmops pains Santanna & Rodrigues, 2018 — Brazil
- Stemmops questus Levi, 1955 — Mexico to Venezuela
- Stemmops salenas Marques & Buckup, 1996 — Brazil
- Stemmops satpudaensis Rajoria, 2015 — India
- Stemmops servus Levi, 1964 — Panama, Brazil
- Stemmops subtilis (Simon, 1895) — Venezuela
- Stemmops vicosa Levi, 1964 — Brazil
- Stemmops victoria Levi, 1955 — Mexico

=== Stoda ===
Stoda Saaristo, 2006

- Stoda libudum (Roberts, 1978) (type) — Seychelles

=== Styposis ===
Styposis

Styposis clausis

Styposis Simon, 1894

- Styposis ajo Levi, 1960 — USA
- Styposis albula (Gertsch, 1960) — Guyana
- Styposis camoteensis (Levi, 1967) — Chile (Juan Fernandez Is.)
- Styposis chickeringi Levi, 1960 — Panama
- Styposis clausis Levi, 1960 — USA to Colombia
- Styposis colorados Levi, 1964 — Ecuador
- Styposis flavescens Simon, 1894 (type) — Nicaragua to Venezuela
- Styposis kahuziensis Miller, 1970 — Congo
- Styposis lutea (Petrunkevitch, 1930) — Puerto Rico
- Styposis nicaraguensis Levi, 1960 — Nicaragua
- Styposis rancho Levi, 1960 — Venezuela
- Styposis scleropsis Levi, 1960 — Panama
- Styposis selis Levi, 1964 — Brazil
- Styposis tepus (Levi, 1967) — Chile

== T ==
=== Takayus ===
Takayus Yoshida, 2001

- Takayus chikunii (Yaginuma, 1960) — China, Japan
- Takayus codomaculatus Yin, 2012 — China
- Takayus fujisawai Yoshida, 2002 — Japan
- Takayus huanrenensis (Zhu & Gao, 1993) — China
- Takayus kunmingicus (Zhu, 1998) — China
- Takayus latifolius (Yaginuma, 1960) — Russia (Far East), China, Korea, Japan
- Takayus linimaculatus (Zhu, 1998) — China
- Takayus lunulatus (Guan & Zhu, 1993) — Russia (Far East), China, Korea
- Takayus lushanensis (Zhu, 1998) — China
- Takayus naevius (Zhu, 1998) — China
- Takayus papiliomaculatus Yin, Peng & Zhang, 2005 — China
- Takayus quadrimaculatus (Song & Kim, 1991) — China, Korea
- Takayus simplicus Yin, 2012 — China
- Takayus sublatifolius (Zhu, 1998) — China
- Takayus takayensis (Saito, 1939) (type) — China, Korea, Japan
- Takayus wangi (Zhu, 1998) — China
- Takayus xui (Zhu, 1998) — China

=== Tamanidion ===
Tamanidion Wunderlich, 2011

- Tamanidion multidenticuli Wunderlich, 2011 (type) — Malaysia

=== Tekellina ===
Tekellina Levi, 1957

- Tekellina archboldi Levi, 1957 (type) — USA
- Tekellina bella Marques & Buckup, 1993 — Brazil
- Tekellina crica Marques & Buckup, 1993 — Brazil
- Tekellina guaiba Marques & Buckup, 1993 — Brazil
- Tekellina helixicis Gao & Li, 2014 — China
- Tekellina minor Marques & Buckup, 1993 — Brazil
- Tekellina pretiosa Marques & Buckup, 1993 — Brazil
- Tekellina sadamotoi Yoshida & Ogata, 2016 — Japan
- Tekellina yoshidai Marusik & Omelko, 2017 — Russia (Far East)

=== Theonoe ===
Theonoe Simon, 1881

- Theonoe africana Caporiacco, 1947 — Tanzania
- Theonoe formivora (Walckenaer, 1841) — France
- Theonoe major Denis, 1961 — Spain
- Theonoe minutissima (O. Pickard-Cambridge, 1879) (type) — Europe
- Theonoe sola Thaler & Steinberger, 1988 — Germany, Austria
- Theonoe stridula Crosby, 1906 — USA, Canada

=== Theridion ===
Theridion

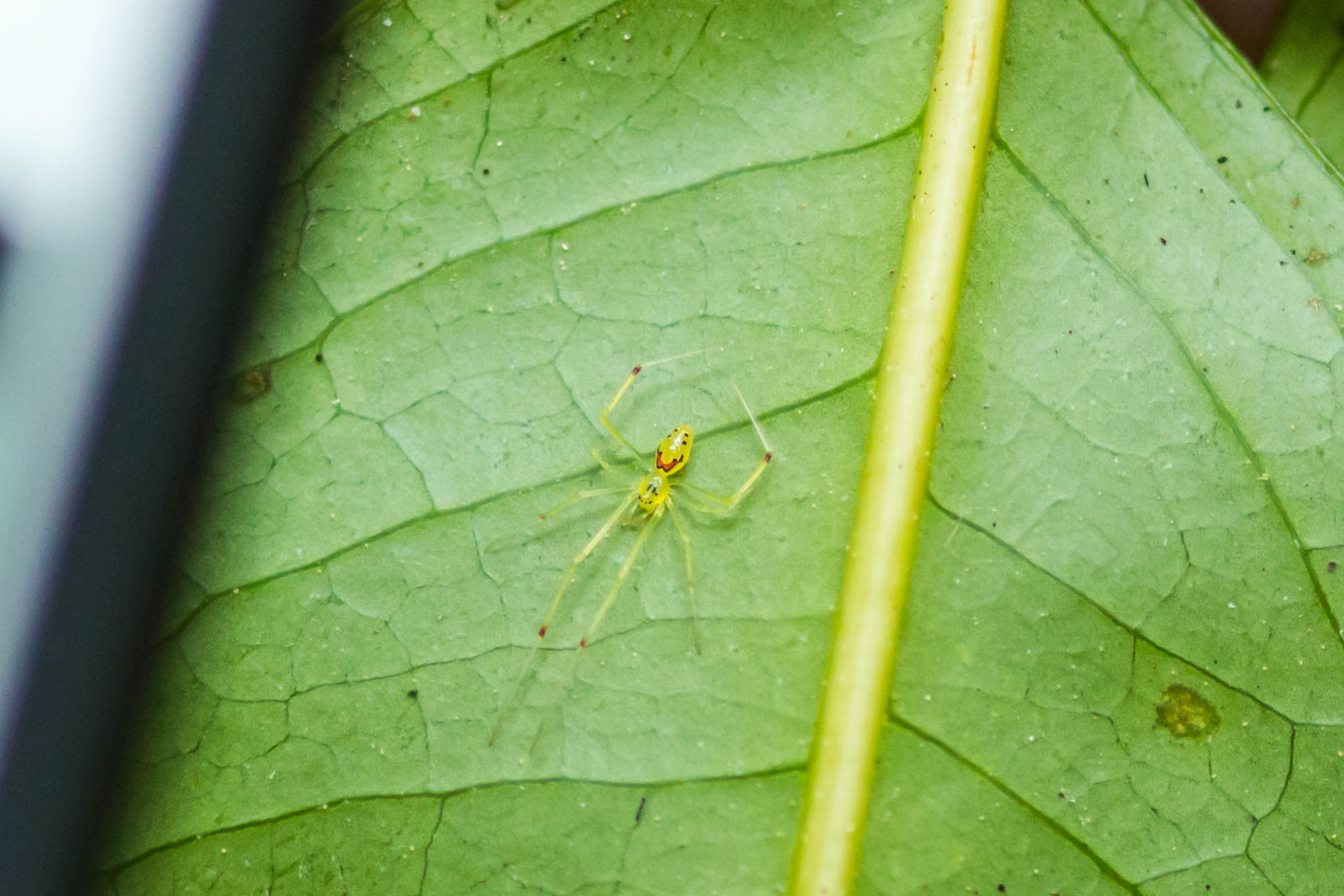
Hawaiian happy face spider
(Theridion grallator)

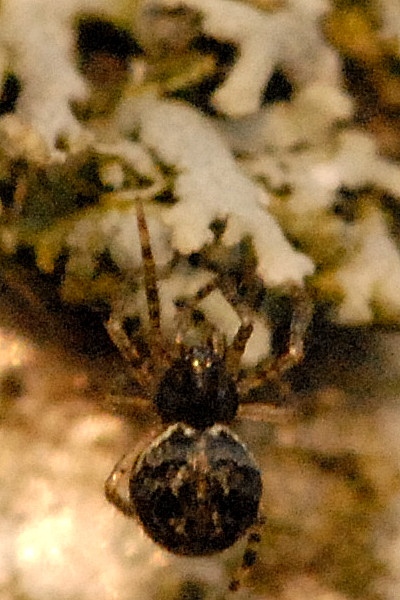
Theridion mystaceum

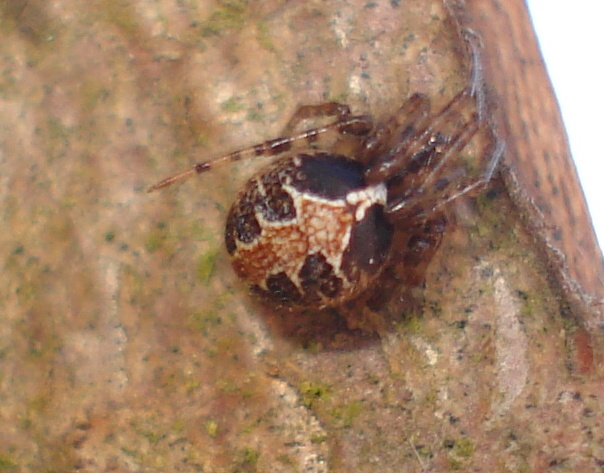
Theridion pictum

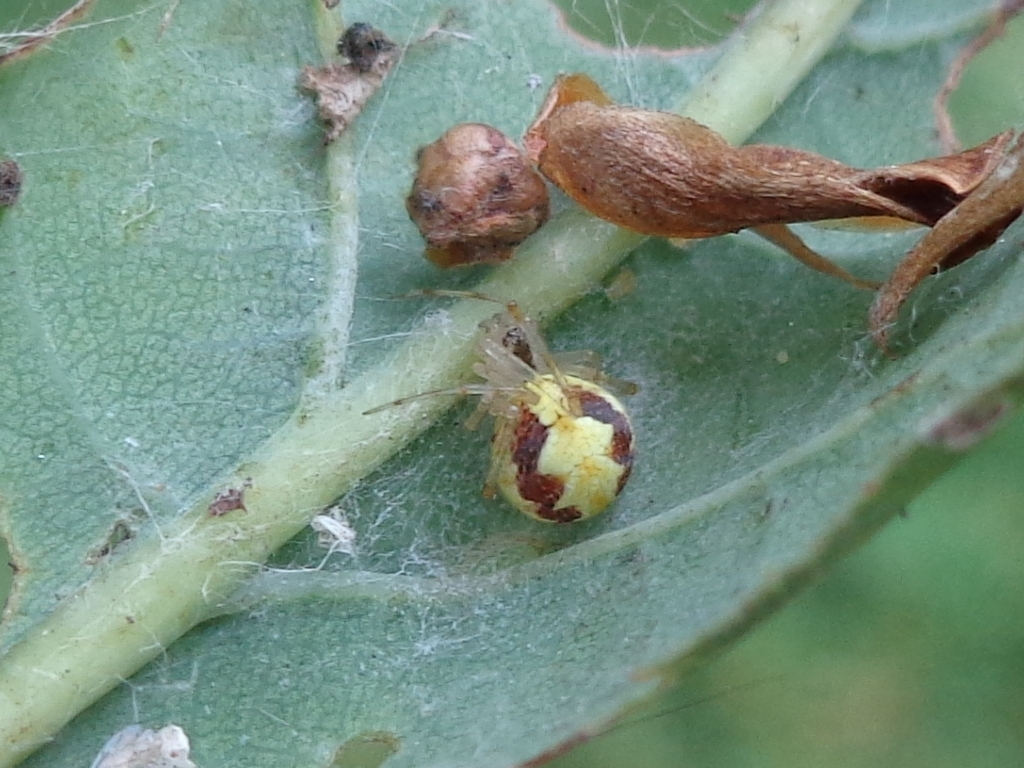
Theridion varians

Theridion Walckenaer, 1805

- Theridion abruptum Simon, 1884 — North Africa
- Theridion acanthopodum Gao & Li, 2014 — China
- Theridion accoense Levy, 1985 — Israel
- Theridion acutitarse Simon, 1900 — Hawaii
- Theridion adjacens (O. Pickard-Cambridge, 1896) — Mexico to Panama
- Theridion adrianopoli Drensky, 1915 — Macedonia, Bulgaria, Albania, Greece (incl. Crete), Turkey
- Theridion aeolium Levi, 1963 — USA
- Theridion agrarium Levi, 1963 — Brazil
- Theridion agreste Nicolet, 1849 — Chile
- Theridion agrifoliae Levi, 1957 — USA, Canada
- Theridion akme Levi, 1959 — Panama
- Theridion akron Levi, 1959 — Panama
- Theridion albidorsum Strand, 1909 — South Africa
- Theridion albidum Banks, 1895 — USA, Canada
- Theridion albioculum Zhu, 1998 — China
- Theridion albipes L. Koch, 1878 — Caucasus (Russia, Georgia)
- Theridion albocinctum Urquhart, 1892 — New Zealand
- Theridion albodecoratum Rainbow, 1916 — Australia (Queensland)
- Theridion albolineatum Nicolet, 1849 — Chile
- Theridion albolineolatum Caporiacco, 1940 — Ethiopia
- Theridion albomaculosum O. Pickard-Cambridge, 1869 — Sri Lanka
- Theridion albopictum Thorell, 1898 — Myanmar
- Theridion albostriatum (L. Koch, 1867) — New Guinea, Australia (Queensland, Norfolk Is.), Tonga
- Theridion albulum O. Pickard-Cambridge, 1898 — Panama
- Theridion amarga Levi, 1967 — Chile, Argentina
- Theridion amatitlan Levi, 1963 — Guatemala
- Theridion ambiguum Nicolet, 1849 — Chile
- Theridion ampascachi Mello-Leitão, 1941 — Argentina
- Theridion ampliatum Urquhart, 1892 — New Zealand
- Theridion angusticeps Caporiacco, 1949 — Kenya
- Theridion angustifrons Caporiacco, 1934 — Karakorum
- Theridion anson Levi, 1967 — Chile (Juan Fernandez Is.)
- Theridion antillanum Simon, 1894 — Caribbean
- Theridion apiculatum Roewer, 1942 — Australia (Queensland)
- Theridion aporum Levi, 1963 — Brazil
- Theridion apostoli Mello-Leitão, 1945 — Argentina
- Theridion apulco Levi, 1959 — Mexico
- Theridion aragua Levi, 1963 — Venezuela
- Theridion archeri Levi, 1959 — Cuba
- Theridion argentatulum Roewer, 1942 — New Zealand
- Theridion arizonense Levi, 1957 — USA
- Theridion artum Levi, 1959 — Panama, Trinidad
- Theridion aruanum Strand, 1911 — Indonesia (Aru Is.)
- Theridion arushae Caporiacco, 1947 — Tanzania
- Theridion asbolodes Rainbow, 1917 — Australia (South Australia)
- Theridion asopi Vanuytven, 2014 — Western and Central Europe, Italy
- Theridion astrigerum Thorell, 1895 — Myanmar
- Theridion atratum Thorell, 1877 — Indonesia (Sulawesi)
- Theridion attritum (Simon, 1908) — Australia (Western Australia)
- Theridion auberti Simon, 1904 — South Africa
- Theridion aulos Levi, 1963 — Brazil
- Theridion australe Banks, 1899 — USA, Mexico, Caribbean
- Theridion baccula Thorell, 1887 — Myanmar
- Theridion baltasarense Levi, 1963 — Windward Is.
- Theridion banksi Berland, 1920 — East Africa
- Theridion barbarae Levi, 1959 — Mexico
- Theridion beebei Levi, 1963 — Venezuela
- Theridion bellatulum Levi, 1963 — Brazil
- Theridion bengalensis Sen, Saha & Raychaudhuri, 2011 — India
- Theridion bergi Levi, 1963 — Brazil, Paraguay, Argentina
- Theridion berlandi Roewer, 1942 — Samoa
- Theridion bernardi Lecigne, 2017 — Portugal
- Theridion betteni Wiehle, 1960 — Europe, Turkey
- Theridion bicruciatum Roewer, 1961 — Senegal
- Theridion bidepressum Yin, Peng & Zhang, 2005 — China
- Theridion biezankoi Levi, 1963 — Brazil
- Theridion biforaminum Gao & Zhu, 1993 — China
- Theridion biolleyi Banks, 1909 — Costa Rica
- Theridion biseriatum Thorell, 1890 — Indonesia (Sumatra)
- Theridion bisignatum (Mello-Leitão, 1945) — Brazil, Argentina
- Theridion bitakum Barrion & Litsinger, 1995 — Philippines
- Theridion blaisei Simon, 1909 — Vietnam
- Theridion boesenbergi Strand, 1904 — Europe, Caucasus
- Theridion bolivari Levi, 1959 — Mexico
- Theridion bolum Levi, 1963 — Brazil
- Theridion bomae Schmidt, 1957 — Congo
- Theridion bosniense Wunderlich, 2011 — Bosnia and Herzegovina
- Theridion botanicum Levi, 1963 — Venezuela
- Theridion brachypus Thorell, 1887 — Myanmar
- Theridion bradyanum Strand, 1907 — South Africa
- Theridion brunellii Caporiacco, 1940 — Ethiopia
- Theridion brunneonigrum Caporiacco, 1949 — Kenya
- Theridion bryantae Roewer, 1951 — Mexico
- Theridion bullatum Tullgren, 1910 — Tanzania
- Theridion buxtoni Berland, 1929 — Samoa, French Polynesia (Society Is., Tuamotu Arch.), Pitcairn Is. (Henderson Is.)
- Theridion cairoense Wunderlich, 2011 — Egypt
- Theridion calcynatum Holmberg, 1876 — Venezuela to Argentina
- Theridion californicum Banks, 1904 — USA, Canada
- Theridion caliginosum Marples, 1955 — Samoa
- Theridion cameronense Levi, 1957 — USA, Mexico
- Theridion campestratum Simon, 1900 — Hawaii
- Theridion caplandense Strand, 1907 — South Africa
- Theridion carinatum Yin, Peng & Zhang, 2005 — China
- Theridion carpathium Brignoli, 1984 — Greece
- Theridion cassinicola Simon, 1907 — Guinea-Bissau
- Theridion castaneum Franganillo, 1931 — Cuba
- Theridion catharina Marples, 1955 — Samoa
- Theridion cavipalpe (F. O. Pickard-Cambridge, 1902) — Guatemala
- Theridion cazieri Levi, 1959 — Bahama Is.
- Theridion centrum Levi, 1959 — Panama
- Theridion ceylonicus Dunlop & Jekel, 2009 — Sri Lanka
- Theridion chacoense Levi, 1963 — Bolivia
- Theridion chakinuense Wunderlich, 1995 — Turkmenistan
- Theridion chamberlini Caporiacco, 1949 — Kenya
- Theridion charitonowi Caporiacco, 1949 — Kenya
- Theridion charlati Dierkens, 2016 — French Polynesia (Society Is.: Tahiti)
- Theridion cheimatos Gertsch & Archer, 1942 — USA
- Theridion cheni Zhu, 1998 — China
- Theridion chihuahua Levi, 1959 — Mexico
- Theridion chiriqui Levi, 1959 — Panama
- Theridion chonetum Zhu, 1998 — China
- Theridion choroni Levi, 1963 — Venezuela
- Theridion cinctipes Banks, 1898 — USA, Mexico
- Theridion cinereum Thorell, 1875 — Switzerland and Italy to Ukraine and Turkey, Caucasus, Russia (Europe) to Central Asia
- Theridion circuitum Gao & Li, 2014 — China
- Theridion circumtextum Simon, 1907 — Guinea-Bissau
- Theridion climacode Thorell, 1898 — Myanmar
- Theridion clivalum Zhu, 1998 — China
- Theridion cloxum Roberts, 1983 — Seychelles (Aldabra)
- Theridion clypeatellum Tullgren, 1910 — East Africa
- Theridion cochise Levi, 1963 — USA
- Theridion cochrum Levi, 1963 — Brazil
- Theridion cocosense Strand, 1906 — Costa Rica
- Theridion coenosum Thorell, 1887 — Myanmar
- Theridion cohni Levi, 1963 — Brazil
- Theridion coldeniae Baert & Maelfait, 1986 — Ecuador (Galapagos Is.)
- Theridion comstocki Berland, 1920 — East Africa
- Theridion confusum O. Pickard-Cambridge, 1885 — China (Yarkand)
- Theridion contreras Levi, 1959 — Mexico
- Theridion convexellum Roewer, 1942 — Australia (Queensland, New South Wales)
- Theridion convexisternum Caporiacco, 1949 — Kenya
- Theridion corcyraeum Brignoli, 1984 — Greece (Corfu, Crete)
- Theridion costaricaense Levi, 1963 — Costa Rica to Venezuela
- Theridion cowlesae Levi, 1957 — USA
- Theridion coyoacan Levi, 1959 — Mexico
- Theridion cruciferum Urquhart, 1886 — New Zealand
- Theridion crucum Levi, 1959 — Mexico
- Theridion cuspulatum Schmidt & Krause, 1998 — Cape Verde Is.
- Theridion cuyutlan Levi, 1963 — Mexico
- Theridion cygneum Gao & Li, 2014 — China
- Theridion cynicum Gertsch & Mulaik, 1936 — USA, Mexico
- Theridion cyprusense Wunderlich, 2011 — Cyprus
- Theridion dafnense Levy & Amitai, 1982 — Israel
- Theridion darolense Strand, 1906 — Ethiopia
- Theridion davisorum Levi, 1959 — Mexico
- Theridion dayongense Zhu, 1998 — China
- Theridion decemmaculatum Thorell, 1890 — Indonesia (Sumatra)
- Theridion decemperlatum (Simon, 1889) — Madagascar
- Theridion dedux O. Pickard-Cambridge, 1904 — South Africa
- Theridion delicatum O. Pickard-Cambridge, 1904 — South Africa
- Theridion derhami Simon, 1895 — Sierra Leone, Gabon, Equatorial Guinea (Bioko)
- Theridion desertum Ponomarev, 2008 — Kazakhstan
- Theridion diadematum Chrysanthus, 1963 — New Guinea
- Theridion dianiphum Rainbow, 1916 — Australia (Queensland)
- Theridion differens Emerton, 1882 — USA, Canada
- Theridion dilucidum Simon, 1898 — Costa Rica to Venezuela, Caribbean
- Theridion dilutum Levi, 1957 — USA, Mexico
- Theridion dividuum Gertsch & Archer, 1942 — USA
- Theridion dominica Levi, 1963 — Dominican Rep.
- Theridion dreisbachi Levi, 1959 — Mexico
- Theridion dubium Bradley, 1877 — New Guinea
- Theridion dukouense Zhu, 1998 — China
- Theridion dulcineum Gertsch & Archer, 1942 — USA
- Theridion durbanicum Lawrence, 1947 — South Africa
- Theridion ecuadorense Levi, 1963 — Ecuador
- Theridion electum (O. Pickard-Cambridge, 1896) — Mexico
- Theridion elegantissimum Roewer, 1942 — Taiwan
- Theridion elevatum Thorell, 1881 — Australia (Queensland)
- Theridion elisabethae Roewer, 1951 — Mexico
- Theridion elli Sedgwick, 1973 — Chile
- Theridion ellicottense Dobyns & Bond, 1996 — USA
- Theridion emertoni Berland, 1920 — East Africa
- Theridion epiense Berland, 1938 — Vanuatu
- Theridion eremum Levi, 1963 — Brazil
- Theridion eugeni Roewer, 1942 — Equatorial Guinea (Bioko)
- Theridion evexum Keyserling, 1884 — Mexico, Caribbean to Brazil
- Theridion excavatum F. O. Pickard-Cambridge, 1902 — Guatemala
- Theridion exlineae Levi, 1963 — Ecuador, Peru
- Theridion expallidatum O. Pickard-Cambridge, 1885 — China (Yarkand)
- Theridion falcatum Gao & Li, 2014 — China
- Theridion familiare O. Pickard-Cambridge, 1871 — Europe, Caucasus, China
- Theridion fastosum Keyserling, 1884 — Ecuador, Peru
- Theridion fatuhivaense Berland, 1933 — Marquesas Is.
- Theridion femorale Thorell, 1881 — Australia (Queensland)
- Theridion femoratissimum Caporiacco, 1949 — Kenya
- Theridion fernandense Simon, 1907 — Equatorial Guinea (Bioko)
- Theridion filum Levi, 1963 — Brazil
- Theridion flabelliferum Urquhart, 1887 — New Zealand
- Theridion flavonotatum Becker, 1879 — USA, Cuba
- Theridion flavoornatum Thorell, 1898 — Myanmar
- Theridion fornicatum Simon, 1884 — Sudan
- Theridion frio Levi, 1959 — Mexico
- Theridion frizzellorum Levi, 1963 — Colombia, Ecuador, Venezuela
- Theridion frondeum Hentz, 1850 — USA, Bahama Is.
- Theridion fruticum Simon, 1890 — Yemen
- Theridion furfuraceum Simon, 1914 — France, Algeria, Syria
- Theridion fuscodecoratum Rainbow, 1916 — Australia (Queensland)
- Theridion fuscomaculatum Rainbow, 1916 — Australia (Queensland)
- Theridion fuscum Franganillo, 1930 — Cuba
- Theridion gabardi Simon, 1895 — Sri Lanka
- Theridion galerum Levi, 1959 — Panama
- Theridion gekkonicum Levy & Amitai, 1982 — Israel
- Theridion geminipunctum Chamberlin, 1924 — USA, Mexico
- Theridion genistae Simon, 1873 — Mediterranean
- Theridion gertschi Levi, 1959 — USA, Mexico
- Theridion gibbum Rainbow, 1916 — Australia (Queensland)
- Theridion giraulti Rainbow, 1916 — Australia (Queensland)
- Theridion glaciale Caporiacco, 1934 — Karakorum
- Theridion glaucescens Becker, 1879 — USA, Canada
- Theridion glaucinum Simon, 1881 — France
- Theridion goodnightorum Levi, 1957 — USA, Mexico
- Theridion gracilipes Urquhart, 1889 — New Zealand
- Theridion grallator Simon, 1900 — Hawaii
- Theridion gramineum Zhu, 1998 — China
- Theridion grammatophorum Simon, 1909 — Vietnam
- Theridion grandiosum Levi, 1963 — Peru
- Theridion grecia Levi, 1959 — Mexico to Venezuela
- Theridion gyirongense Hu & Li, 1987 — China
- Theridion hainenense Zhu, 1998 — China
- Theridion haleakalense Simon, 1900 — Hawaii
- Theridion hannoniae Denis, 1945 — Europe, North Africa, Turkey, Madeira, Canary Is.
- Theridion harmsi Wunderlich, 2011 — Portugal, Spain, France
- Theridion hartmeyeri Simon, 1908 — Australia (Western Australia)
- Theridion hassleri Levi, 1963 — Hispaniola
- Theridion hebridisianum Berland, 1938 — Vanuatu
- Theridion helena Wunderlich, 2011 — Greece (Crete)
- Theridion helophorum Thorell, 1895 — Indonesia (Java)
- Theridion hemerobium Simon, 1914 — USA, Canada, Europe, Turkey
- Theridion hermonense Levy, 1991 — Tunisia, Israel, Iran
- Theridion hewitti Caporiacco, 1949 — Ethiopia
- Theridion hidalgo Levi, 1957 — USA, Mexico
- Theridion hierichonticum Levy & Amitai, 1982 — Israel
- Theridion hispidum O. Pickard-Cambridge, 1898 — Mexico, Caribbean to Paraguay
- Theridion histrionicum Thorell, 1875 — Italy
- Theridion hondurense Levi, 1959 — Honduras
- Theridion hopkinsi Berland, 1929 — Samoa
- Theridion hotanense Zhu & Zhou, 1993 — China
- Theridion huanuco Levi, 1963 — Peru
- Theridion hufengense Tang, Yin & Peng, 2005 — China
- Theridion hui Zhu, 1998 — China
- Theridion humboldti Levi, 1967 — Peru
- Theridion hummeli Schenkel, 1936 — China
- Theridion hupingense Yin, 2012 — China
- Theridion idiotypum Rainbow, 1917 — Australia (South Australia)
- Theridion illecebrosum Simon, 1886 — Senegal
- Theridion impegrum Keyserling, 1886 — Brazil
- Theridion impressithorax Simon, 1895 — Philippines
- Theridion incanescens Simon, 1890 — Egypt, Yemen
- Theridion incertissimum (Caporiacco, 1954) — French Guiana, Brazil
- Theridion incertum O. Pickard-Cambridge, 1885 — India
- Theridion incomtum (O. Pickard-Cambridge, 1896) — Guatemala
- Theridion inconspicuum Thorell, 1898 — Myanmar
- Theridion indicum Tikader, 1977 — India (Andaman Is.)
- Theridion innocuum Thorell, 1875 — Ukraine, Russia (Europe to south Siberia), Kazakhstan
- Theridion inquinatum Thorell, 1878 — Myanmar, Singapore, Indonesia (Ambon)
  - Theridion inquinatum continentale Strand, 1907 — China
- Theridion insignitarse Simon, 1907 — Gabon
- Theridion intritum (Bishop & Crosby, 1926) — USA
- Theridion iramon Levi, 1963 — Colombia, Ecuador
- Theridion irrugatum Gao & Li, 2014 — China
- Theridion ischagosum Barrion & Litsinger, 1995 — Philippines
- Theridion isorium Levi, 1963 — Peru
- Theridion istokpoga Levi, 1957 — USA to Panama
- Theridion italiense Wunderlich, 1995 — Italy, Macedonia, Romania
- Theridion jordanense Levy & Amitai, 1982 — Egypt, Israel, Syria
- Theridion kambalum Barrion & Litsinger, 1995 — Philippines
- Theridion karamayense Zhu, 1998 — China
- Theridion kauaiense Simon, 1900 — Hawaii
- Theridion kawea Levi, 1957 — USA, Mexico
- Theridion kibonotense Tullgren, 1910 — East Africa
- Theridion kiliani Müller & Heimer, 1990 — Colombia
- Theridion kobrooricum Strand, 1911 — Indonesia (Aru Is.)
- Theridion kochi Roewer, 1942 — Samoa
- Theridion kraepelini Simon, 1905 — Indonesia (Java)
- Theridion kraussi Marples, 1957 — Fiji
- Theridion lacticolor Berland, 1920 — Kenya, Yemen, Madagascar
- Theridion laevigatum Blackwall, 1870 — Italy
- Theridion lago Levi, 1963 — Ecuador
- Theridion lamperti Strand, 1906 — Ethiopia
- Theridion lanceatum Zhang & Zhu, 2007 — China
- Theridion lapidicola Kulczyński, 1887 — Italy
- Theridion latisternum Caporiacco, 1934 — Karakorum
- Theridion lawrencei Gertsch & Archer, 1942 — USA
- Theridion leechi Gertsch & Archer, 1942 — USA, Canada
- Theridion leguiai Chamberlin, 1916 — Colombia, Peru
- Theridion lenzianum Strand, 1907 — South Africa
- Theridion leones Levi, 1959 — Mexico
- Theridion leucophaeum Simon, 1905 — India
- Theridion leve Blackwall, 1877 — Seychelles
- Theridion leviorum Gertsch & Riechert, 1976 — USA
- Theridion liaoyuanense (Zhu & Yu, 1982) — China
- Theridion limatum Tullgren, 1910 — Tanzania
- Theridion limitatum L. Koch, 1872 — Australia (Queensland, New South Wales)
- Theridion linaresense Levi, 1963 — Chile
- Theridion linzhiense Hu, 2001 — China
- Theridion llano Levi, 1957 — USA
- Theridion logan Levi & Patrick, 2013 — USA
- Theridion lomirae Roewer, 1938 — New Guinea
- Theridion longicrure Marples, 1956 — New Zealand
- Theridion longiductum Liu & Peng, 2012 — China
- Theridion longihirsutum Strand, 1907 — China
- Theridion longioembolia Liu & Peng, 2012 — China
- Theridion longipalpum Zhu, 1998 — China, Korea
- Theridion longipedatum Roewer, 1942 — Colombia
- Theridion longipili Seo, 2004 — Korea
- Theridion ludekingi Thorell, 1890 — Indonesia (Java)
- Theridion ludius Simon, 1880 — Malaysia to Australia, New Caledonia
- Theridion lumabani Barrion & Litsinger, 1995 — Philippines
- Theridion luteitarse Schmidt & Krause, 1995 — Cape Verde Is.
- Theridion macei Simon, 1895 — Congo
- Theridion machu Levi, 1963 — Peru
- Theridion macropora Tang, Yin & Peng, 2006 — China
- Theridion macuchi Levi, 1963 — Ecuador
- Theridion maculiferum Roewer, 1942 — Tanzania (Zanzibar)
- Theridion magdalenense Müller & Heimer, 1990 — Colombia
- Theridion maindroni Simon, 1905 — India
- Theridion makotoi Yoshida, 2009 — Japan
- Theridion malagaense Wunderlich, 2011 — Spain, Italy (Sardinia)
- Theridion manjithar Tikader, 1970 — India
- Theridion manonoense Marples, 1955 — Samoa
- Theridion maranum Levi, 1963 — Venezuela
- Theridion maron Levi, 1963 — Paraguay
- Theridion martini Levi, 1959 — Mexico
- Theridion mataafa Marples, 1955 — Samoa
- Theridion mauense Caporiacco, 1949 — Kenya
- Theridion mauiense Simon, 1900 — Hawaii
- Theridion mehlum Roberts, 1983 — Seychelles (Aldabra)
- Theridion melanoplax Schmidt & Krause, 1996 — Canary Is.
- Theridion melanoprorum Thorell, 1895 — Myanmar
  - Theridion melanoprorum orientale Simon, 1909 — Vietnam
- Theridion melanostictum O. Pickard-Cambridge, 1876 — Macaronesia, Mediterranean to Egypt, India, Central Asia, China, Japan. Introduced to Poland, Canada, USA, Galapagos Is., Society Is.
- Theridion melanurum Hahn, 1831 — Macaronesia, North Africa, Europe, Turkey, Caucasus, Russia (Europe to middle Siberia), Middle East. Introduced to USA
- Theridion melinum Simon, 1900 — Hawaii
- Theridion mendozae Berland, 1933 — Marquesas Is.
- Theridion meneghettii Caporiacco, 1949 — Kenya
- Theridion metabolum Chamberlin & Ivie, 1936 — Panama
- Theridion metator Simon, 1907 — Guinea-Bissau
- Theridion michelbacheri Levi, 1957 — USA
- Theridion micheneri Levi, 1963 — Panama
- Theridion minutissimum Keyserling, 1884 — Panama, Peru
- Theridion minutulum Thorell, 1895 — Myanmar
- Theridion miserum Thorell, 1898 — Myanmar
- Theridion modestum (Simon, 1894) — Sri Lanka
- Theridion molliculum Thorell, 1899 — Cameroon
- Theridion mollissimum L. Koch, 1872 — Australia, Samoa
- Theridion monzonense Levi, 1963 — Peru
- Theridion mortuale Simon, 1908 — Australia (Western Australia)
- Theridion morulum O. Pickard-Cambridge, 1898 — USA, Mexico
- Theridion mucidum Gao & Li, 2014 — China
- Theridion murarium Emerton, 1882 — North America
- Theridion musivivoides Schmidt & Krause, 1995 — Cape Verde Is.
- Theridion musivivum Schmidt, 1956 — Azores, Canary Is., Madeira
- Theridion myersi Levi, 1957 — USA, Mexico, Jamaica
- Theridion mystaceum L. Koch, 1870 — Europe, Turkey, Russia (Europe to south Siberia), China
- Theridion mysteriosum Schmidt, 1971 — Ecuador
- Theridion nadleri Levi, 1959 — Trinidad
- Theridion nagorum Roberts, 1983 — Seychelles (Aldabra)
- Theridion nasinotum Caporiacco, 1949 — Kenya
- Theridion nasutum Wunderlich, 1995 — Italy (Sardinia)
- Theridion necijaense Barrion & Litsinger, 1995 — Philippines
- Theridion negebense Levy & Amitai, 1982 — Spain, Israel
- Theridion neomexicanum Banks, 1901 — USA, Canada
- Theridion neshamini Levi, 1957 — USA
- Theridion nigriceps Keyserling, 1891 — Brazil
- Theridion nigroannulatum Keyserling, 1884 — Ecuador, Peru
- Theridion nigroplagiatum Caporiacco, 1949 — Kenya
- Theridion nigropunctulatum Thorell, 1898 — Myanmar
- Theridion nigrosacculatum Tullgren, 1910 — Tanzania
- Theridion nilgherinum Simon, 1905 — India
- Theridion niphocosmum Rainbow, 1916 — Australia (Queensland)
- Theridion niveopunctatum Thorell, 1898 — Myanmar
- Theridion niveum O. Pickard-Cambridge, 1898 — Mexico
- Theridion nivosum Rainbow, 1916 — Australia (Queensland)
- Theridion nodiferum Simon, 1895 — Sri Lanka
- Theridion nojimai Yoshida, 1999 — China, Japan
- Theridion nudum Levi, 1959 — Mexico, Panama
- Theridion oatesi Thorell, 1895 — Myanmar
- Theridion obscuratum Zhu, 1998 — China
- Theridion ochreolum Levy & Amitai, 1982 — Israel
- Theridion octoferum Strand, 1909 — South Africa
- Theridion odoratum Zhu, 1998 — China
- Theridion omiltemi Levi, 1959 — Mexico, Guatemala
- Theridion onticolum Levi, 1963 — Peru
- Theridion opolon Levi, 1963 — Brazil
- Theridion opuntia Levi, 1963 — Mexico
- Theridion orgea (Levi, 1967) — Brazil
- Theridion orlando (Archer, 1950) — USA
- Theridion osprum Levi, 1963 — Venezuela
- Theridion oswaldocruzi Levi, 1963 — Brazil
- Theridion otsospotum Barrion & Litsinger, 1995 — Philippines
- Theridion palanum Roberts, 1983 — Seychelles (Aldabra)
- Theridion palgongense Paik, 1996 — Korea
- Theridion pallasi Ponomarev, 2007 — Russia (Europe)
- Theridion pallidulum Roewer, 1942 — East Africa
- Theridion pandani Simon, 1895 — Cambodia
- Theridion panganii Caporiacco, 1947 — Tanzania
- Theridion papillatum Gao & Li, 2014 — China
- Theridion paraense Levi, 1963 — Brazil
- Theridion parvulum Blackwall, 1870 — Italy (Sicily)
- Theridion parvum Keyserling, 1884 — Peru
- Theridion patrizii Caporiacco, 1933 — Libya
- Theridion pelaezi Levi, 1963 — Mexico
- Theridion pennsylvanicum Emerton, 1913 — USA, Canada
- Theridion perkinsi Simon, 1900 — Hawaii
- Theridion pernambucum Levi, 1963 — Brazil
- Theridion perpusillum Simon, 1885 — Malaysia
- Theridion petraeum L. Koch, 1872 — North America, Europe, North Africa, Caucasus, Russia (Europe to Far East), Kazakhstan
- Theridion petrunkevitchi Berland, 1920 — East Africa
- Theridion phaeostomum Simon, 1909 — Vietnam
- Theridion pictum (Walckenaer, 1802) (type) — North America, Europe, North Africa, Caucasus, Russia (Europe to Far East), Kazakhstan, Turkemenistan, China, Japan
- Theridion pierre Levi & Patrick, 2013 — USA
- Theridion pigrum Keyserling, 1886 — Brazil
- Theridion pilatum Urquhart, 1893 — Australia (Tasmania)
- Theridion piligerum Frauenfeld, 1867 — India (Nicobar Is.)
- Theridion piliphilum Strand, 1907 — South Africa
- Theridion pinastri L. Koch, 1872 — Europe, Turkey, Caucasus, China, Korea, Japan
- Theridion pinguiculum Simon, 1909 — Vietnam
- Theridion pinicola Simon, 1873 — France (Corsica), Morocco, Algeria, Tunisia
- Theridion pires Levi, 1963 — Brazil
- Theridion piriforme Berland, 1938 — Vanuatu
- Theridion plaumanni Levi, 1963 — Venezuela, Brazil
- Theridion plectile Simon, 1909 — Vietnam
- Theridion plumipes Hasselt, 1882 — Indonesia (Sumatra)
- Theridion pluviale Tullgren, 1910 — Tanzania
- Theridion poecilum Zhu, 1998 — China
- Theridion porphyreticum Urquhart, 1889 — New Zealand
- Theridion positivum Chamberlin, 1924 — USA, Caribbean to Paraguay
- Theridion posticatum Simon, 1900 — Hawaii
- Theridion postmarginatum Tullgren, 1910 — Tanzania
- Theridion praeclusum Tullgren, 1910 — Tanzania
- Theridion praemite Simon, 1907 — Sierra Leone
- Theridion praetextum Simon, 1900 — Hawaii
  - Theridion praetextum concolor Simon, 1900 — Hawaii
- Theridion prominens Blackwall, 1870 — Italy
- Theridion proximum Lawrence, 1964 — South Africa
- Theridion puellae Locket, 1980 — Comoros
- Theridion pulanense Hu, 2001 — China
- Theridion pumilio Urquhart, 1886 — New Zealand
- Theridion punctipes Emerton, 1924 — USA, Mexico
- Theridion punicapunctatum Urquhart, 1891 — New Zealand
- Theridion punongpalayum Barrion & Litsinger, 1995 — Philippines
- Theridion purcelli O. Pickard-Cambridge, 1904 — St. Helena, South Africa
- Theridion pyramidale L. Koch, 1867 — Australia (Queensland, New South Wales)
- Theridion pyrenaeum Denis, 1945 — Spain, France, Andorra
- Theridion qingzangense Hu, 2001 — China
- Theridion quadratum (O. Pickard-Cambridge, 1882) — Sri Lanka, Indonesia (Sumatra)
- Theridion quadrilineatum Lenz, 1886 — Madagascar
- Theridion quadripapulatum Thorell, 1895 — Myanmar
- Theridion quadripartitum Keyserling, 1891 — Brazil
- Theridion rabuni Chamberlin & Ivie, 1944 — USA, Bahama Is.
- Theridion rafflesi Simon, 1899 — Indonesia (Sumatra)
- Theridion rampum Levi, 1963 — Peru, Venezuela
- Theridion ravum Levi, 1963 — Venezuela
- Theridion reinhardti Charitonov, 1946 — Uzbekistan
- Theridion resum Levi, 1959 — Panama
- Theridion retreatense Strand, 1909 — South Africa
- Theridion retrocitum Simon, 1909 — Vietnam
- Theridion rhodonotum Simon, 1909 — Vietnam
- Theridion ricense Levi, 1959 — Puerto Rico
- Theridion rossi Levi, 1963 — Peru
- Theridion rostriferum Simon, 1895 — West Africa
- Theridion rothi Levi, 1959 — Mexico
- Theridion rubiginosum Keyserling, 1884 — Brazil
- Theridion rubrum (Keyserling, 1886) — Brazil
- Theridion rurrenabaque Levi, 1963 — Bolivia
- Theridion ruwenzoricola Strand, 1913 — Central Africa
- Theridion saanichum Chamberlin & Ivie, 1947 — USA, Canada
- Theridion sabinjonis Strand, 1913 — Central Africa
- Theridion sadani Monga & Singh, 1989 — India
- Theridion samoense Berland, 1929 — Samoa
- Theridion sanctum Levi, 1959 — Mexico
- Theridion sangzhiense Zhu, 1998 — China
- Theridion sardis Chamberlin & Ivie, 1944 — USA
- Theridion saropus Thorell, 1887 — Myanmar
- Theridion schlingeri Levi, 1963 — Peru
- Theridion schrammeli Levi, 1963 — Mexico
- Theridion sciaphilum Benoit, 1977 — St. Helena
- Theridion semitinctum Simon, 1914 — Spain (mainland, Balearic Is.), France, Italy
- Theridion senckenbergi Levi, 1963 — Venezuela
- Theridion septempunctatum Berland, 1933 — Marquesas Is.
- Theridion sertatum Simon, 1909 — Vietnam
- Theridion setiferum Roewer, 1942 — Myanmar
- Theridion setosum L. Koch, 1872 — Australia (Queensland), Vanuatu, Samoa, New Caledonia
- Theridion setum Zhu, 1998 — China
- Theridion sibiricum Marusik, 1988 — Russia (Urals to Far East), Kazakhstan, Mongolia
- Theridion sinaloa Levi, 1959 — Mexico
- Theridion soaresi Levi, 1963 — Brazil, Paraguay
- Theridion societatis Berland, 1934 — French Polynesia (Society Is.: Tahiti)
- Theridion solium Benoit, 1977 — St. Helena
- Theridion spinigerum Rainbow, 1916 — Australia (Queensland)
- Theridion spinitarse O. Pickard-Cambridge, 1876 — North Africa, Saudi Arabia, Yemen
- Theridion spinosissimum Caporiacco, 1934 — Karakorum
- Theridion squalidum Urquhart, 1886 — New Zealand
- Theridion squamosum Gao & Li, 2014 — China
- Theridion stamotum Levi, 1963 — Venezuela
- Theridion stannardi Levi, 1963 — Mexico
- Theridion strepitus Peck & Shear, 1987 — Ecuador (Galapagos Is.)
- Theridion striatum Keyserling, 1884 — Brazil
- Theridion styligerum F. O. Pickard-Cambridge, 1902 — Mexico, Guatemala
- Theridion subitum O. Pickard-Cambridge, 1885 — India
- Theridion submirabile Zhu & Song, 1993 — China, Korea
- Theridion submissum Gertsch & Davis, 1936 — USA, Mexico, Bahama Is., Jamaica
- Theridion subpingue Simon, 1908 — Australia (Western Australia)
- Theridion subplaumanni Liu & Peng, 2012 — China
- Theridion subradiatum Simon, 1901 — Malaysia
- Theridion subrotundum Keyserling, 1891 — Brazil
- Theridion subvittatum Simon, 1889 — India
- Theridion sulawesiense Marusik & Penney, 2004 — Indonesia (Sulawesi)
- Theridion swarczewskii Werjbitzky, 1902 — Azerbaijan
- Theridion t-notatum Thorell, 1895 — Myanmar, Malaysia, Singapore
- Theridion taegense Paik, 1996 — Korea
- Theridion tahitiae Berland, 1934 — Tahiti
- Theridion tamerlani Roewer, 1942 — Myanmar
- Theridion tayrona Müller & Heimer, 1990 — Colombia
- Theridion tebanum Levi, 1963 — Venezuela
- Theridion teliferum Simon, 1895 — Sri Lanka
- Theridion tenellum C. L. Koch, 1841 — Greece
- Theridion tengchongensis Liu & Peng, 2012 — China
- Theridion tenuissimum Thorell, 1898 — Myanmar
- Theridion teresae Levi, 1963 — Trinidad, Brazil
- Theridion tessellatum Thorell, 1899 — Cameroon
- Theridion teutanoides Caporiacco, 1949 — Kenya
- Theridion thalia Workman, 1878 — Myanmar
- Theridion theridioides (Keyserling, 1890) — China, Australia (Queensland, New South Wales)
- Theridion thorelli L. Koch, 1865 — Australia (New South Wales)
- Theridion tikaderi Patel, 1973 — India
- Theridion timpanogos Levi, 1957 — USA
- Theridion tinctorium Keyserling, 1891 — Brazil
- Theridion todinum Simon, 1880 — New Caledonia
- Theridion topo Levi, 1963 — Ecuador
- Theridion torosum Keyserling, 1884 — Peru
- Theridion trahax Blackwall, 1866 — Africa
- Theridion transgressum Petrunkevitch, 1911 — USA, Mexico
- Theridion trepidum O. Pickard-Cambridge, 1898 — Mexico to Panama
- Theridion triangulare Franganillo, 1936 — Cuba
- Theridion trifile Simon, 1907 — West, East Africa
- Theridion trigonicum Thorell, 1890 — Indonesia (Sumatra, Java)
- Theridion tristani Levi, 1959 — Costa Rica
- Theridion triviale Thorell, 1881 — Australia
- Theridion trizonatum Caporiacco, 1949 — Kenya
- Theridion tubicola Doleschall, 1859 — Indonesia (Java, Moluccas), New Guinea
- Theridion turanicum Charitonov, 1946 — Uzbekistan
- Theridion turrialba Levi, 1959 — Costa Rica
- Theridion uber Keyserling, 1884 — Brazil
- Theridion uhligi Martin, 1974 — Europe
- Theridion umbilicus Levi, 1963 — Brazil
- Theridion uncatum F. O. Pickard-Cambridge, 1902 — Mexico
- Theridion undatum Zhu, 1998 — China
- Theridion undulanotum Roewer, 1942 — Vanuatu
- Theridion urnigerum Thorell, 1898 — Myanmar
- Theridion ursoi Caporiacco, 1947 — Ethiopia
- Theridion urucum Levi, 1963 — Brazil
- Theridion usitum Strand, 1913 — Central Africa
- Theridion utcuyacu Levi, 1963 — Peru
- Theridion valleculum Levi, 1959 — Panama
- Theridion vallisalinarum Levy & Amitai, 1982 — Israel
- Theridion vanhoeffeni Strand, 1909 — South Africa
- Theridion varians Hahn, 1833 — North America, Europe, North Africa, Turkey, Caucasus, Russia (Europe to Siberia), Central Asia, China
  - Theridion varians cyrenaicum Caporiacco, 1933 — Libya
  - Theridion varians rusticum Simon, 1873 — Western Mediterranean
- Theridion ventricosum Rainbow, 1916 — Australia (Queensland)
- Theridion vespertinum Levy, 1985 — Israel
- Theridion viridanum Urquhart, 1887 — New Zealand
- Theridion volubile Keyserling, 1884 — Venezuela, Ecuador, Peru
- Theridion vosseleri Strand, 1907 — East Africa
- Theridion vossi Strand, 1907 — Cameroon
- Theridion vossioni Simon, 1884 — Sudan
- Theridion vulvum Levi, 1959 — Panama
- Theridion weberi Thorell, 1892 — Singapore
- Theridion weyrauchi Levi, 1963 — Peru
- Theridion whitcombi Sedgwick, 1973 — Chile
- Theridion wiehlei Schenkel, 1938 — Spain, France, Algeria, Russia (Europe), Kazakhstan
- Theridion workmani Thorell, 1887 — Myanmar
- Theridion xanthostichum (Rainbow, 1916) — Australia (Queensland)
- Theridion xianfengense Zhu & Song, 1992 — China, Taiwan
- Theridion yani Zhu, 1998 — China
- Theridion yuma Levi, 1963 — USA
- Theridion yunnanense Schenkel, 1963 — China
- Theridion zantholabio Urquhart, 1886 — New Zealand
- Theridion zebra Caporiacco, 1949 — Kenya
- Theridion zekharya Levy, 2007 — Israel
- Theridion zhangmuense Hu, 2001 — China
- Theridion zhaoi Zhu, 1998 — China
- Theridion zhoui Zhu, 1998 — China
- Theridion zonarium Keyserling, 1884 — Peru
- Theridion zonatum Eydoux & Souleyet, 1841 — Unknown
- Theridion zonulatum Thorell, 1890 — India, China, Thailand, Singapore, Indonesia (Sumatra, Borneo)

=== Theridula ===
Theridula

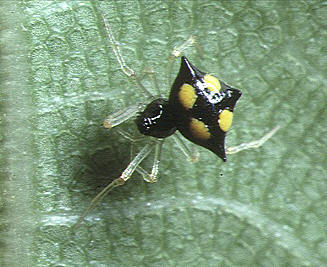
Theridula gonygaster, female

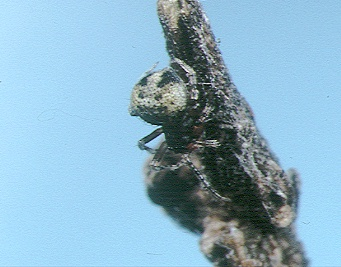
Theridula iriomotensis, female

Theridula Emerton, 1882

- Theridula aelleni (Hubert, 1970) — Spain, Madeira, Tunisia
- Theridula albonigra Caporiacco, 1949 — Kenya
  - Theridula albonigra vittata Caporiacco, 1949 — Kenya
- Theridula casas Levi, 1954 — Mexico
- Theridula emertoni Levi, 1954 — USA, Canada
- Theridula faceta (O. Pickard-Cambridge, 1894) — Mexico, Guatemala
- Theridula gonygaster (Simon, 1873) — Central and South America, Caribbean. Introduced to Europe, Congo, Madagascar, Seychelles, Georgia, China, Japan
- Theridula huberti Benoit, 1977 — St. Helena
- Theridula iriomotensis Yoshida, 2001 — Japan
- Theridula multiguttata Keyserling, 1886 — Brazil
- Theridula nigerrima (Petrunkevitch, 1911) — Ecuador, Peru
- Theridula opulenta (Walckenaer, 1841) (type) — North America. Introduced to southern Europe
- Theridula perlata Simon, 1889 — Madagascar
- Theridula puebla Levi, 1954 — Mexico, Panama
- Theridula pulchra Berland, 1920 — East Africa
- Theridula sexpupillata Mello-Leitão, 1941 — Brazil
- Theridula theriella Strand, 1907 — Madagascar
- Theridula zhangmuensis Hu, 2001 — China

=== Thwaitesia ===
Thwaitesia

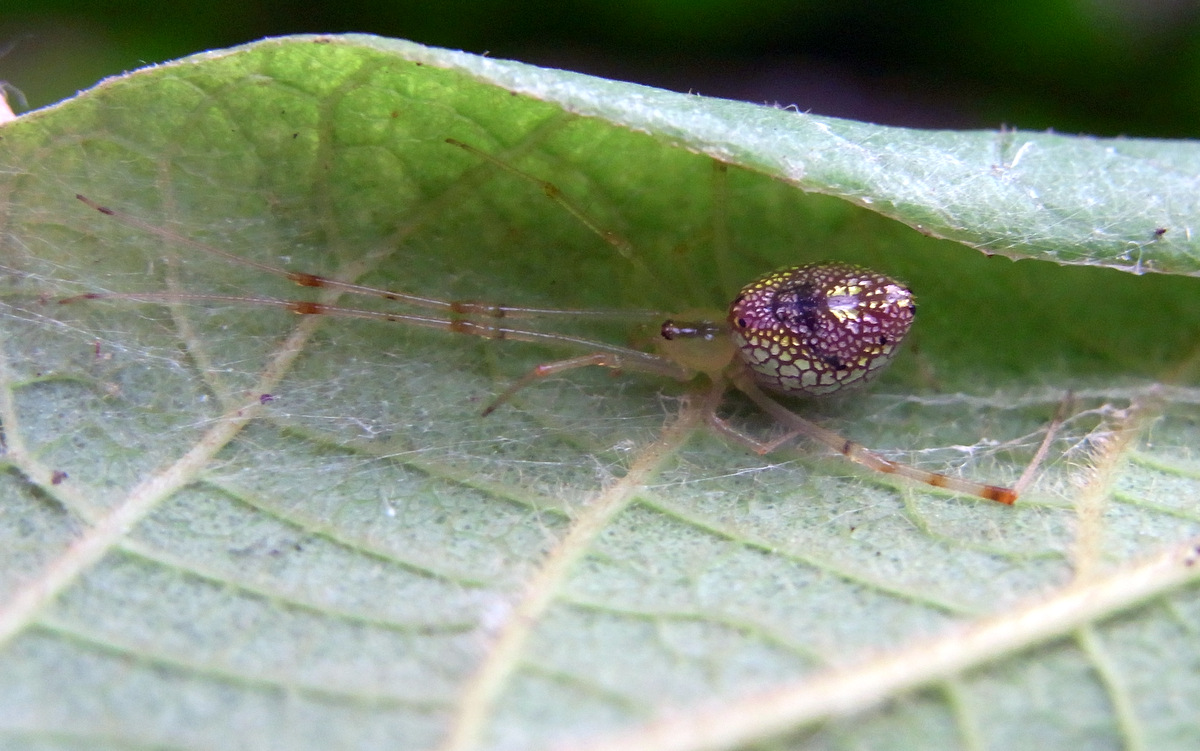
Mirror spider
(Thwaitesia argentiopunctata)

Thwaitesia O. Pickard-Cambridge, 1881

- Thwaitesia affinis O. Pickard-Cambridge, 1882 — Panama to Paraguay
- Thwaitesia algerica Simon, 1895 — Algeria
- Thwaitesia argentata Thorell, 1890 — Indonesia (Sumatra)
- Thwaitesia argenteoguttata (Tullgren, 1910) — Kenya, Tanzania
- Thwaitesia argenteosquamata (Lenz, 1891) — Madagascar
- Thwaitesia argentiopunctata (Rainbow, 1916) — Australia (Queensland)
- Thwaitesia aureosignata (Lenz, 1891) — Madagascar
- Thwaitesia bracteata (Exline, 1950) — Trinidad, Colombia to Paraguay
- Thwaitesia dangensis Patel & Patel, 1972 — India
- Thwaitesia glabicauda Zhu, 1998 — China
- Thwaitesia inaurata (Vinson, 1863) — Réunion
- Thwaitesia margaritifera O. Pickard-Cambridge, 1881 (type) — India, Sri Lanka, China, Vietnam
- Thwaitesia meruensis (Tullgren, 1910) — Tanzania
- Thwaitesia nigrimaculata Song, Zhang & Zhu, 2006 — China
- Thwaitesia nigronodosa (Rainbow, 1912) — Australia (Queensland)
- Thwaitesia phoenicolegna Thorell, 1895 — Myanmar, Vietnam
- Thwaitesia pulcherrima Butler, 1883 — Madagascar
- Thwaitesia rhomboidalis Simon, 1903 — Equatorial Guinea
- Thwaitesia scintillans Kulczyński, 1911 — New Guinea
- Thwaitesia simoni (Keyserling, 1884) — Brazil
- Thwaitesia spinicauda Thorell, 1895 — Myanmar
- Thwaitesia splendida Keyserling, 1884 — Panama to Venezuela
- Thwaitesia turbinata Simon, 1903 — Sierra Leone

=== Thymoites ===
Thymoites Keyserling, 1884

- Thymoites aloitus Levi, 1964 — Brazil
- Thymoites amprus Levi, 1964 — Panama
- Thymoites anicus Levi, 1964 — Brazil
- Thymoites anserma Levi, 1964 — Colombia
- Thymoites banksi (Bryant, 1948) — Hispaniola
- Thymoites bellissimus (L. Koch, 1879) — Scandinavia, Russia (Europe to Far East), China
- Thymoites bocaina Rodrigues & Brescovit, 2015 — Brazil
- Thymoites bogus (Levi, 1959) — Panama
- Thymoites boneti (Levi, 1959) — Mexico
- Thymoites boquete (Levi, 1959) — Mexico to Panama
- Thymoites bradti (Levi, 1959) — Mexico
- Thymoites camano (Levi, 1957) — USA
- Thymoites camaqua Rodrigues & Brescovit, 2015 — Brazil
- Thymoites cancellatus Mello-Leitão, 1943 — Argentina
- Thymoites caracasanus (Simon, 1895) — Guatemala to Ecuador
- Thymoites chiapensis (Levi, 1959) — Mexico
- Thymoites chickeringi (Levi, 1959) — Panama
- Thymoites chikunii (Yoshida, 1988) — Japan
- Thymoites chopardi (Berland, 1920) — East Africa
- Thymoites confraternus (Banks, 1898) — Mexico to Peru
- Thymoites corus (Levi, 1959) — Mexico
- Thymoites crassipes Keyserling, 1884 (type) — Peru
- Thymoites cravilus Marques & Buckup, 1992 — Brazil
- Thymoites cristal Rodrigues & Brescovit, 2015 — Brazil
- Thymoites delicatulus (Levi, 1959) — Mexico to Venezuela
- Thymoites ebus Levi, 1964 — Brazil
- Thymoites elongatus Peng, Yin & Hu, 2008 — China
- Thymoites expulsus (Gertsch & Mulaik, 1936) — USA, Mexico, Cuba, Jamaica
- Thymoites gertrudae Müller & Heimer, 1990 — Colombia
- Thymoites gibbithorax (Simon, 1894) — Venezuela
- Thymoites guanicae (Petrunkevitch, 1930) — Mexico, Greater Antilles
- Thymoites hupingensis Gan & Peng, 2015 — China
- Thymoites ilhabela Rodrigues & Brescovit, 2015 — Brazil
- Thymoites illudens (Gertsch & Mulaik, 1936) — USA to Colombia
- Thymoites ilvan Levi, 1964 — Brazil
- Thymoites incachaca Levi, 1964 — Bolivia
- Thymoites indicatus (Banks, 1929) — Nicaragua to Panama
- Thymoites ipiranga Levi, 1964 — Brazil
- Thymoites iritus Levi, 1964 — Brazil
- Thymoites levii Gruia, 1973 — Cuba
- Thymoites lobifrons (Simon, 1894) — Venezuela
- Thymoites lori Levi, 1964 — Peru
- Thymoites luculentus (Simon, 1894) — Mexico to Panama, St. Vincent
- Thymoites machu Levi, 1967 — Peru
- Thymoites maderae (Gertsch & Archer, 1942) — USA to Panama
- Thymoites maracayensis Levi, 1964 — Venezuela, Brazil
- Thymoites marxi (Crosby, 1906) — USA, Mexico
- Thymoites matachic (Levi, 1959) — Mexico
- Thymoites melloleitaoni (Bristowe, 1938) — Brazil
- Thymoites minero Roth, 1992 — USA
- Thymoites minnesota Levi, 1964 — USA, Canada
- Thymoites mirus Levi, 1964 — Brazil
- Thymoites missionensis (Levi, 1957) — USA to Costa Rica
- Thymoites murici Rodrigues & Brescovit, 2015 — Brazil
- Thymoites nentwigi Yoshida, 1994 — Indonesia (Krakatau)
- Thymoites nevada Müller & Heimer, 1990 — Colombia
- Thymoites notabilis (Levi, 1959) — Panama
- Thymoites oleatus (L. Koch, 1879) — Canada, Greenland, Russia (Europe to Far East)
- Thymoites orilla (Levi, 1959) — Mexico
- Thymoites pallidus (Emerton, 1913) — USA, Caribbean to Venezuela
- Thymoites palo Levi, 1967 — Brazil
- Thymoites peruanus (Keyserling, 1886) — Peru
- Thymoites piarco (Levi, 1959) — Trinidad, Brazil
- Thymoites pictipes (Banks, 1904) — USA
- Thymoites pinheiral Rodrigues & Brescovit, 2015 — Brazil
- Thymoites piratini Rodrigues & Brescovit, 2015 — Brazil
- Thymoites praemollis (Simon, 1909) — Vietnam
- Thymoites prolatus (Levi, 1959) — Panama
- Thymoites promatensis Lise & Silva, 2009 — Brazil
- Thymoites puer (Mello-Leitão, 1941) — Mexico, Brazil, Argentina
- Thymoites ramon Levi, 1964 — Peru
- Thymoites ramosus Gao & Li, 2014 — China
- Thymoites rarus (Keyserling, 1886) — Brazil
- Thymoites reservatus (Levi, 1959) — Panama
- Thymoites sanctus (Chamberlin, 1916) — Peru
- Thymoites sarasota (Levi, 1957) — USA
- Thymoites sclerotis (Levi, 1957) — USA, Mexico
- Thymoites simla (Levi, 1959) — Trinidad
- Thymoites simplex (Bryant, 1940) — Cuba
- Thymoites struthio (Simon, 1895) — Venezuela, Bolivia
- Thymoites stylifrons (Simon, 1894) — Panama, Venezuela, St. Vincent
- Thymoites subtilis (Simon, 1894) — Tanzania (Zanzibar)
- Thymoites tabuleiro Rodrigues & Brescovit, 2015 — Brazil
- Thymoites taiobeiras Rodrigues & Brescovit, 2015 — Brazil
- Thymoites trisetaceus Peng, Yin & Griswold, 2008 — China
- Thymoites ulleungensis (Paik, 1991) — Korea
- Thymoites unimaculatus (Emerton, 1882) — USA, Canada
- Thymoites unisignatus (Simon, 1894) — Colombia, Venezuela
- Thymoites urubamba Levi, 1967 — Peru
- Thymoites verus (Levi, 1959) — Mexico
- Thymoites villarricaensis Levi, 1964 — Paraguay
- Thymoites vivus (O. Pickard-Cambridge, 1899) — Costa Rica
- Thymoites wangi Zhu, 1998 — China
- Thymoites yaginumai Yoshida, 1995 — Japan

=== Tidarren ===
Tidarren Chamberlin & Ivie, 1934

- Tidarren aethiops Knoflach & van Harten, 2006 — Congo
- Tidarren afrum Knoflach & van Harten, 2006 — Cameroon, Uganda
- Tidarren apartiolum Knoflach & van Harten, 2006 — Madagascar
- Tidarren argo Knoflach & van Harten, 2001 — Yemen, Chad
- Tidarren circe Knoflach & van Harten, 2006 — Namibia
- Tidarren cuneolatum (Tullgren, 1910) — Cape Verde Is., Canary Is., Africa, Yemen
- Tidarren dasyglossa Knoflach & van Harten, 2006 — Madagascar
- Tidarren dentigerum Knoflach & van Harten, 2006 — Yemen
- Tidarren ephemerum Knoflach & van Harten, 2006 — Madagascar
- Tidarren gracile Knoflach & van Harten, 2006 — Yemen
- Tidarren griswoldi Knoflach & van Harten, 2006 — Cameroon
- Tidarren haemorrhoidale (Bertkau, 1880) — USA to Argentina
- Tidarren horaki Knoflach & van Harten, 2006 — Madagascar
- Tidarren konrad Knoflach & van Harten, 2006 — Yemen
- Tidarren lanceolatum Knoflach & van Harten, 2006 — Congo
- Tidarren levii Schmidt, 1957 — Congo
- Tidarren mixtum (O. Pickard-Cambridge, 1896) — Mexico to Costa Rica
- Tidarren obtusum Knoflach & van Harten, 2006 — Madagascar
- Tidarren perplexum Knoflach & van Harten, 2006 — Cameroon, Congo
- Tidarren scenicum (Thorell, 1899) — Cameroon, Guinea-Bissau, Ivory Coast, South Africa
- Tidarren sheba Knoflach & van Harten, 2006 — Yemen
- Tidarren sisyphoides (Walckenaer, 1841) (type) — USA to Argentina, Caribbean
- Tidarren ubickorum Knoflach & van Harten, 2006 — South Africa
- Tidarren usambara Knoflach & van Harten, 2006 — Tanzania

=== Tomoxena ===
Tomoxena Simon, 1895

- Tomoxena alearia (Thorell, 1890) — Indonesia (Java, Sumatra)
- Tomoxena dives Simon, 1895 (type) — India
- Tomoxena flavomaculata Simon, 1895 — Indonesia (Sumatra)

== W ==
=== Wamba ===
Wamba O. Pickard-Cambridge, 1896

- Wamba congener O. Pickard-Cambridge, 1896 (type) — USA, Caribbean to Argentina
- Wamba crispulus (Simon, 1895) — Canada to Brazil, Caribbean
- Wamba panamensis (Levi, 1959) — Panama, Ecuador

=== Wirada ===
Wirada

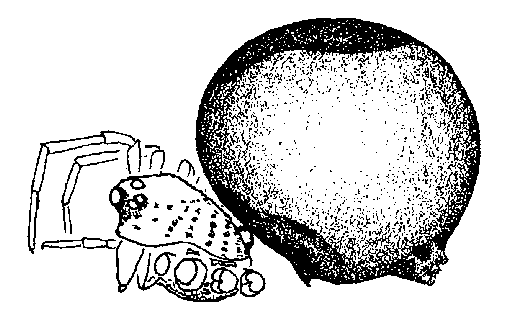
Wirada punctata

Wirada Keyserling, 1886

- Wirada araucaria Lise, Silva & Bertoncello, 2009 — Brazil
- Wirada mexicana Campuzano & Ibarra-Núñez, 2018 — Mexico
- Wirada punctata Keyserling, 1886 (type) — Venezuela, Ecuador, Peru
- Wirada sigillata Lise, Silva & Bertoncello, 2009 — Brazil, Argentina
- Wirada tijuca Levi, 1967 — Brazil
- Wirada tovarensis Simon, 1895 — Venezuela

== Y ==
=== Yaginumena ===
Yaginumena Yoshida, 2002

- Yaginumena castrata (Bösenberg & Strand, 1906) (type) — Russia (Far East), China, Korea, Japan
- Yaginumena maculosa (Yoshida & Ono, 2000) — Turkey, Caucasus (Georgia, Azerbaijan), India, China, Korea, Japan
- Yaginumena mutilata (Bösenberg & Strand, 1906) — Korea, Japan

=== Yoroa ===
Yoroa Baert, 1984

- Yoroa clypeoglandularis Baert, 1984 (type) — New Guinea
- Yoroa taylori Harvey & Waldock, 2000 — Australia (Queensland)

=== Yunohamella ===
Yunohamella

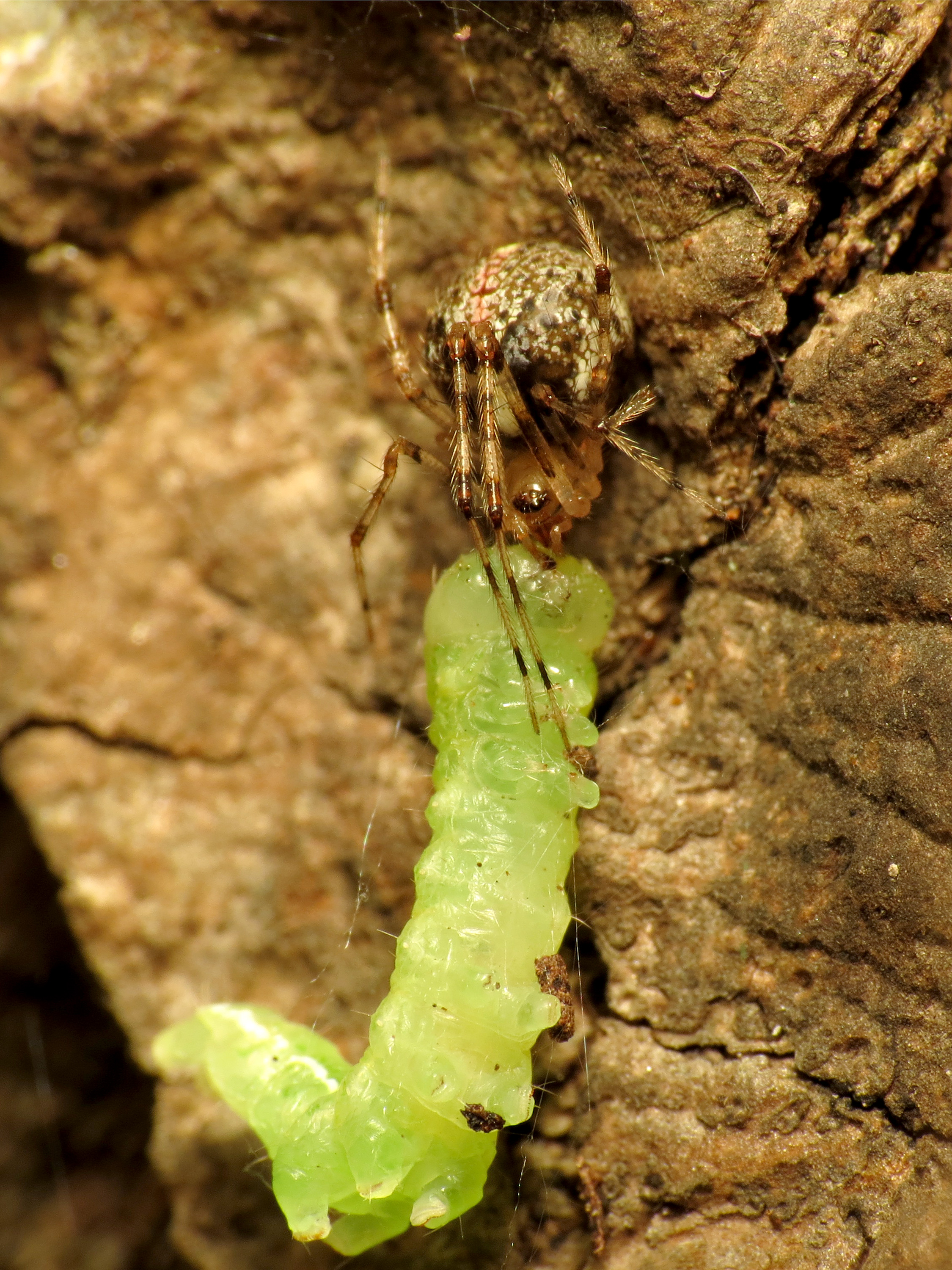
Yunohamella lyrica

Yunohamella Yoshida, 2007

- Yunohamella gibbosa Gao & Li, 2014 — China
- Yunohamella lyrica (Walckenaer, 1841) — North America, Korea, Japan
- Yunohamella palmgreni (Marusik & Tsellarius, 1986) — Finland, Poland, Estonia, Russia (Europe to west Siberia)
- Yunohamella serpatusa (Guan & Zhu, 1993) — Russia (Urals to Far East), China, Korea
- Yunohamella subadulta (Bösenberg & Strand, 1906) — Russia (Far East), Korea, Japan
- Yunohamella takasukai Yoshida, 2012 — Indonesia (Java)
- Yunohamella yunohamensis (Bösenberg & Strand, 1906) (type) — Russia (Sakhalin, Kurile Is.), Korea, Japan

== Z ==
=== Zercidium ===
Zercidium Benoit, 1977

- Zercidium helenense Benoit, 1977 (type) — St. Helena
