= Anatea formicaria =

- A. formicaria

Scientific classification
- Domain: Eukaryota
- Kingdom: Animalia
- Phylum: Arthropoda
- Subphylum: Chelicerata
- Class: Arachnida
- Order: Araneae
- Infraorder: Araneomorphae
- Family: Theridiidae
- Genus: Anatea
- Species: A. formicaria

Binomial name
- Anatea formicaria Berland, 1927
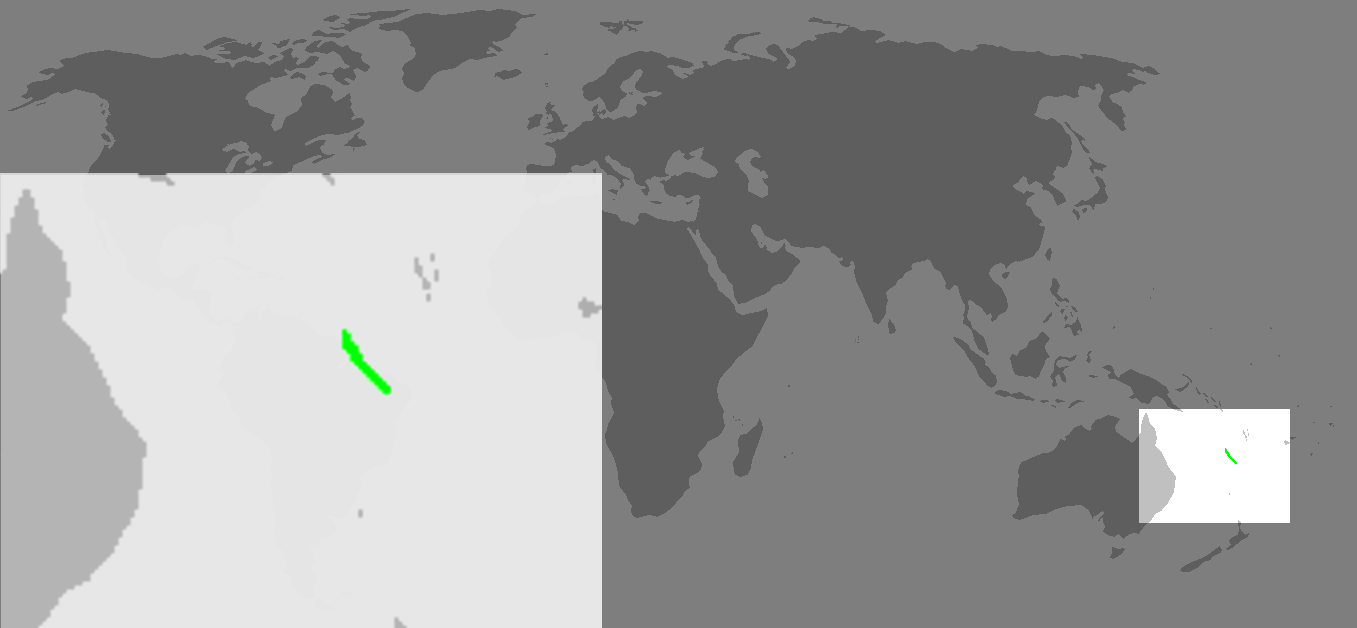

Species of spider

Anatea formicaria is an ant-mimicking spider. It is only known from the rain forest of New Caledonia. Before 1967, it was considered to belong to the family Clubionidae. It was placed there based on the ant-like outward modifications and male genitalia, which superficially resemble those of the genus Micaria. In fact it is closely related to the genera Euryopis and possibly Achaearanea.

Males and females look very similar; the male is 2.5 mm long.

Although the ant shape is unlikely to deceive an ant, the spider does hunt ants. The ant form is therefore probably to evade predators that would eat spiders, but not ants.

Unlike all other ant mimics from the family Theridiidae, A. formicaria mimics the ant's petiole by an elongation of the pedicel. In addition the dorsum of the "petiole" is rugose and has a distinct "node", like most ants do. The abdomen is rounded and highly shiny, mimicking an ant's gaster. The spider mimics the 2.6 mm long myrmicine ant Monomorium croceiventre, which lives in the same habitat. The color pattern (dark brown anterior, light, yellow brown posterior) of both is quite rare in ants, although two other myrmicine ants from the same area of rain forest (Xiphomyrma tenuicrius and Lordomyrma sp.) also show it. Myrmicine ants have large stings, this avoiding predation. The occurrence of the pattern in these three ant species could be Müllerian mimicry, while the spider uses Batesian mimicry (as it is palatable).
