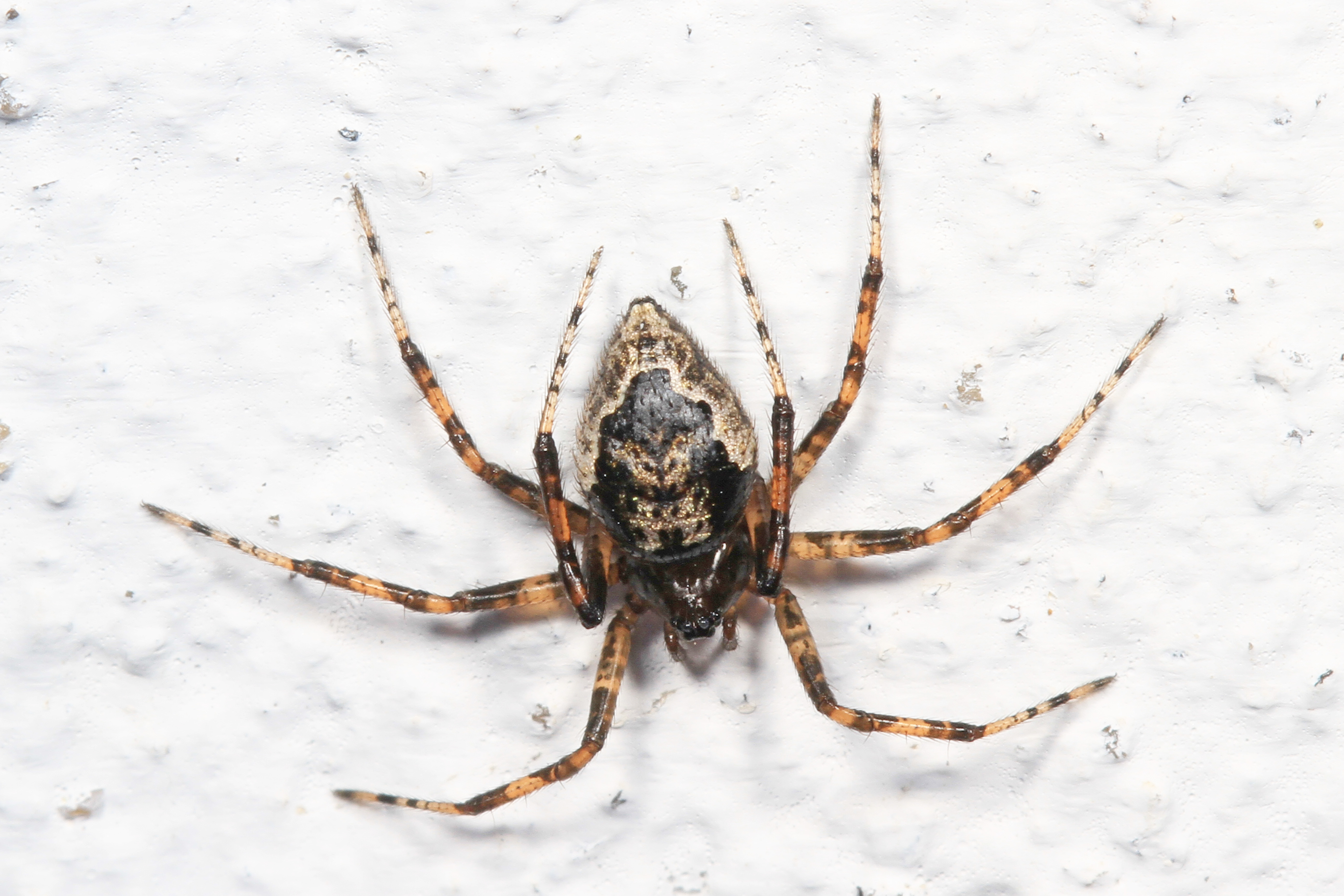
- E. funebris, female
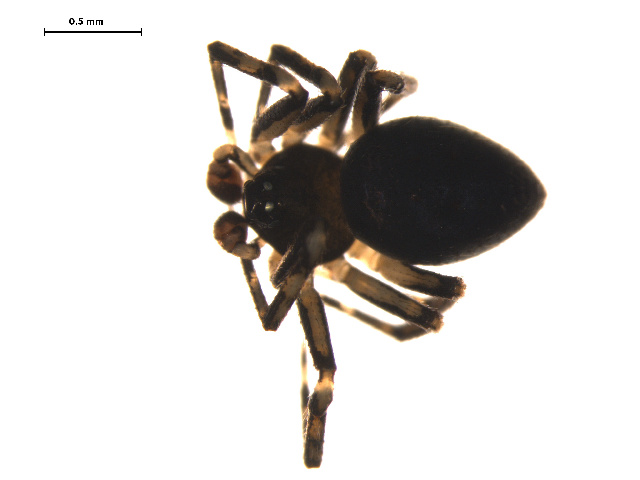
- E. funebris, male

Scientific classification
- Kingdom: Animalia
- Phylum: Arthropoda
- Subphylum: Chelicerata
- Class: Arachnida
- Order: Araneae
- Infraorder: Araneomorphae
- Family: Theridiidae
- Genus: Euryopis
- Species: E. funebris

Binomial name
- Euryopis funebris (Hentz, 1850)

Synonyms
- Theridion funebre Hentz, 1850; Euryopis limbata Chamberlin & Ivie, 1944

= Euryopis funebris =

Species of spider

Euryopis funebris is a species of cobweb spider in the family Theridiidae. It is found in the United States and Canada and has been introduced to South Africa.

== Distribution ==
Euryopis funebris is found in Canada and the USA. It has been introduced to South Africa.

In South Africa, the species has been recorded from the provinces Eastern Cape, Gauteng, KwaZulu-Natal, Limpopo, Mpumalanga, Northern Cape, and Western Cape. Notable locations include Addo Elephant National Park, iSimangaliso Wetland Park, and Kogelberg Nature Reserve.

== Habitat and ecology ==
Euryopis funebris inhabits a large range at altitudes from 1 to 1444 m above sea level.

Ground-dwelling spiders associated with ants, they are sampled in pitfall traps from the Fynbos, Grassland, Indian Ocean Coastal Belt, Savanna, and Thicket biomes.

== Description ==
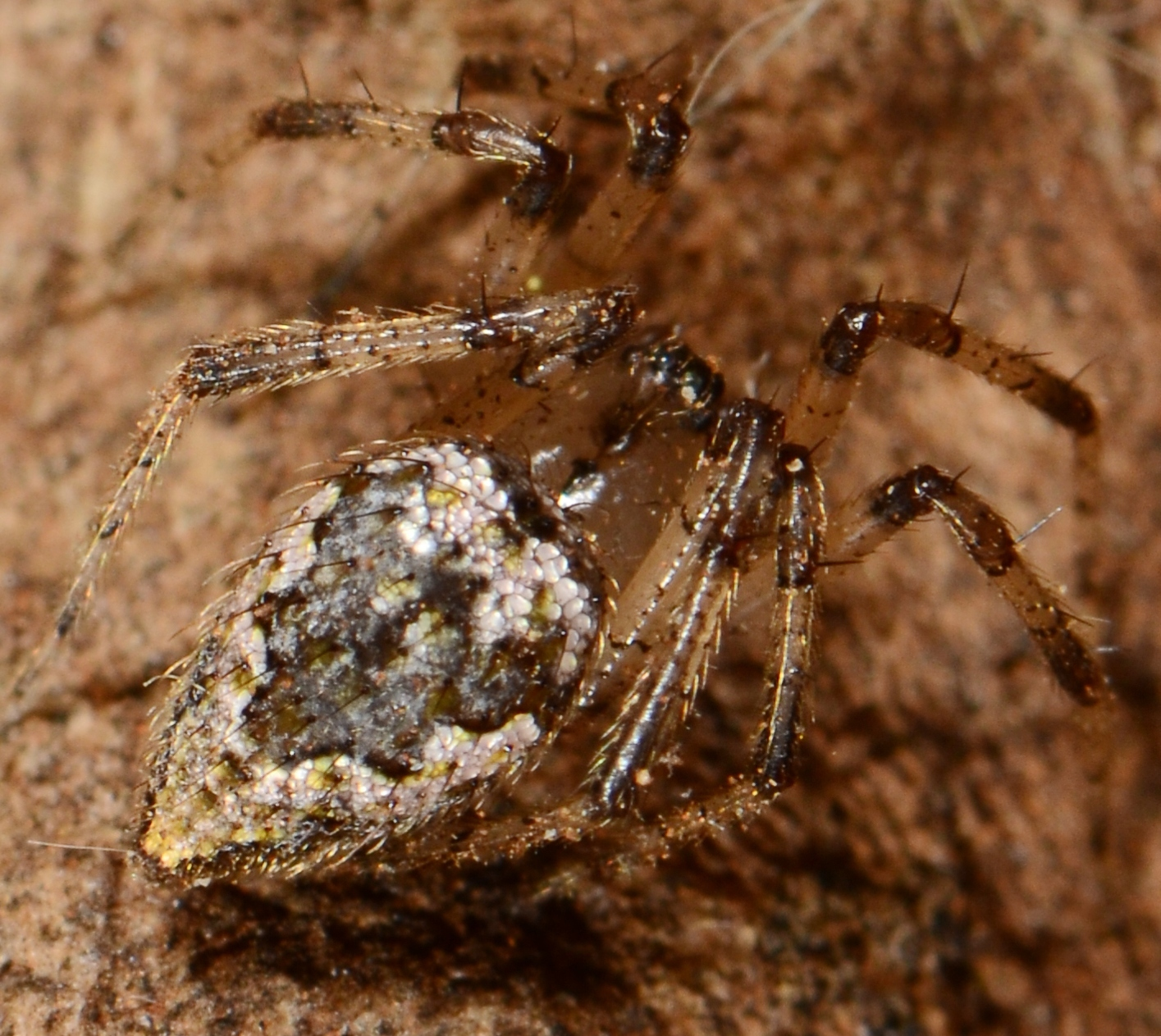
female

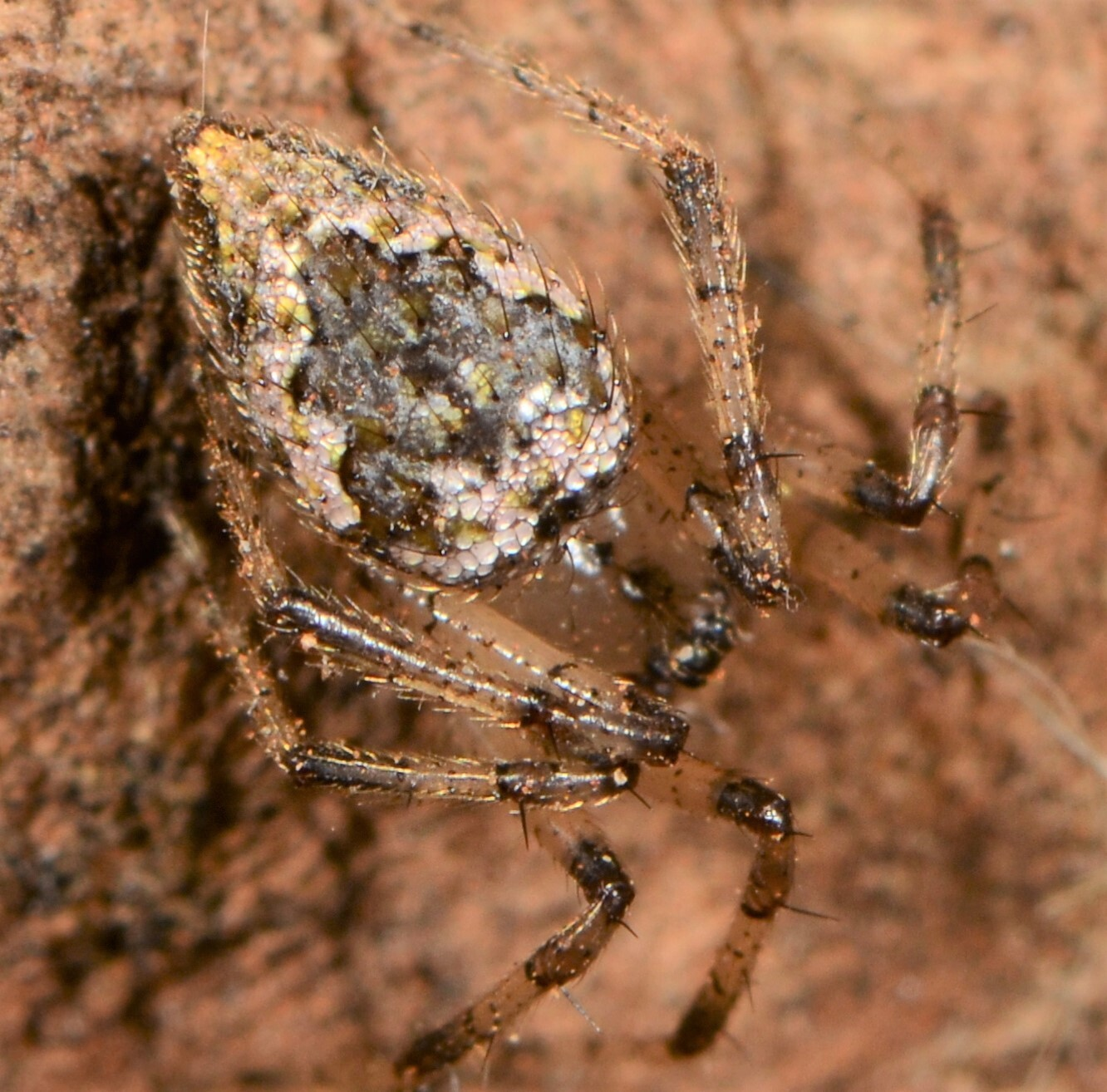
female

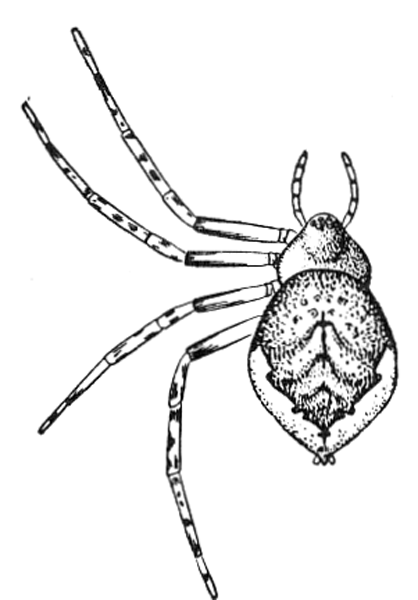
from Emerton (1902)

== Conservation ==
Euryopis funebris is listed as Least Concern by the South African National Biodiversity Institute due to its wide geographical range.
