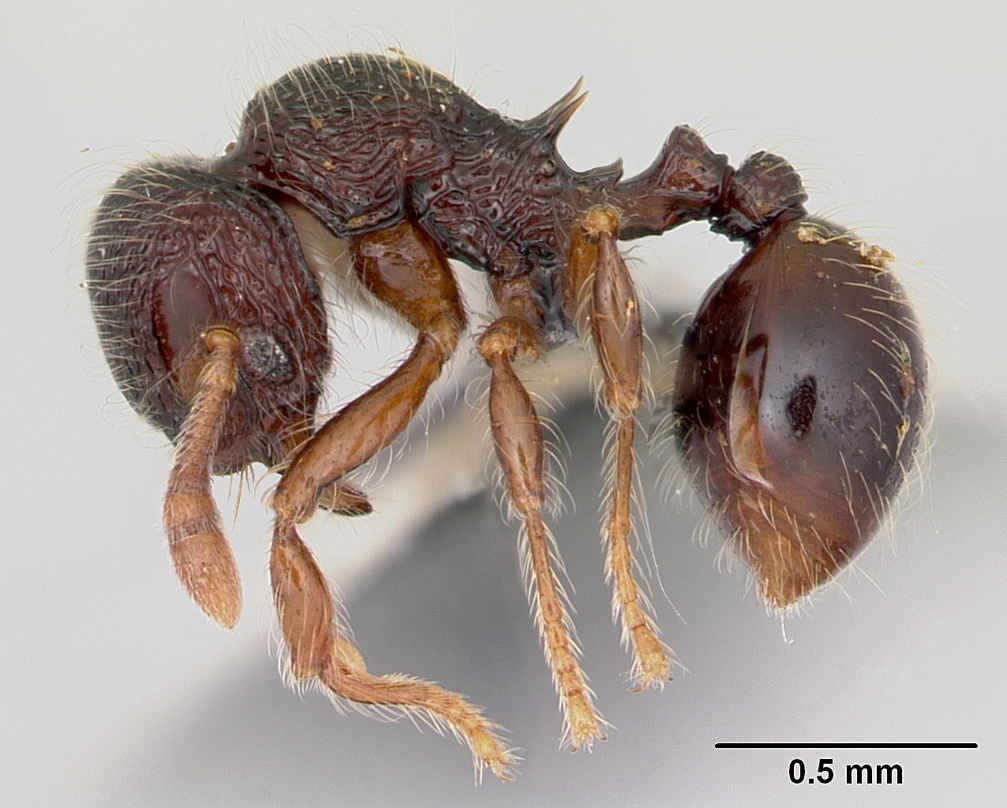
- Lachnomyrmex scrobiculatus worker from Costa Rica

Scientific classification
- Kingdom: Animalia
- Phylum: Arthropoda
- Class: Insecta
- Order: Hymenoptera
- Family: Formicidae
- Subfamily: Myrmicinae
- Tribe: Attini
- Genus: Lachnomyrmex; Wheeler, 1910

Type species
- Lachnomyrmex scrobiculatus Wheeler, 1910

Diversity
- 16 species

= Lachnomyrmex =

Genus of ants

Lachnomyrmex is a Neotropical genus of ants in the subfamily Myrmicinae. The genus consists of 16 species restricted to the Neotropics, known from southern Mexico to northern Argentina (and Trinidad just off the coast of Venezuela). They are most often found in the leaf litter of wet forests, with nests located on the ground. Workers forage alone, apparently without recruiting nestmates or using pheromones. Within the tribe Stenammini, they seem to be most closely related to the genera Lordomyrma of Indo-Australia and Cyphoidris of Africa.

== Species ==
- Lachnomyrmex amazonicus Feitosa & Brandão, 2008
- Lachnomyrmex fernandezi Feitosa & Brandão, 2008
- Lachnomyrmex grandis Fernández & Baena, 1997
- Lachnomyrmex haskinsi Smith, 1944
- Lachnomyrmex laticeps Feitosa & Brandão, 2008
- Lachnomyrmex lattkei Feitosa & Brandão, 2008
- Lachnomyrmex longinodus Fernández & Baena, 1997
- Lachnomyrmex longinoi Feitosa & Brandão, 2008
- Lachnomyrmex mackayi Feitosa & Brandão, 2008
- Lachnomyrmex nordestinus Feitosa & Brandão, 2008
- Lachnomyrmex pilosus Weber, 1950
- Lachnomyrmex platynodus Feitosa & Brandão, 2008
- Lachnomyrmex plaumanni Borgmeier, 1957
- Lachnomyrmex regularis Feitosa & Brandão, 2008
- Lachnomyrmex scrobiculatus Wheeler, 1910
- Lachnomyrmex victori Feitosa & Brandão, 2008
