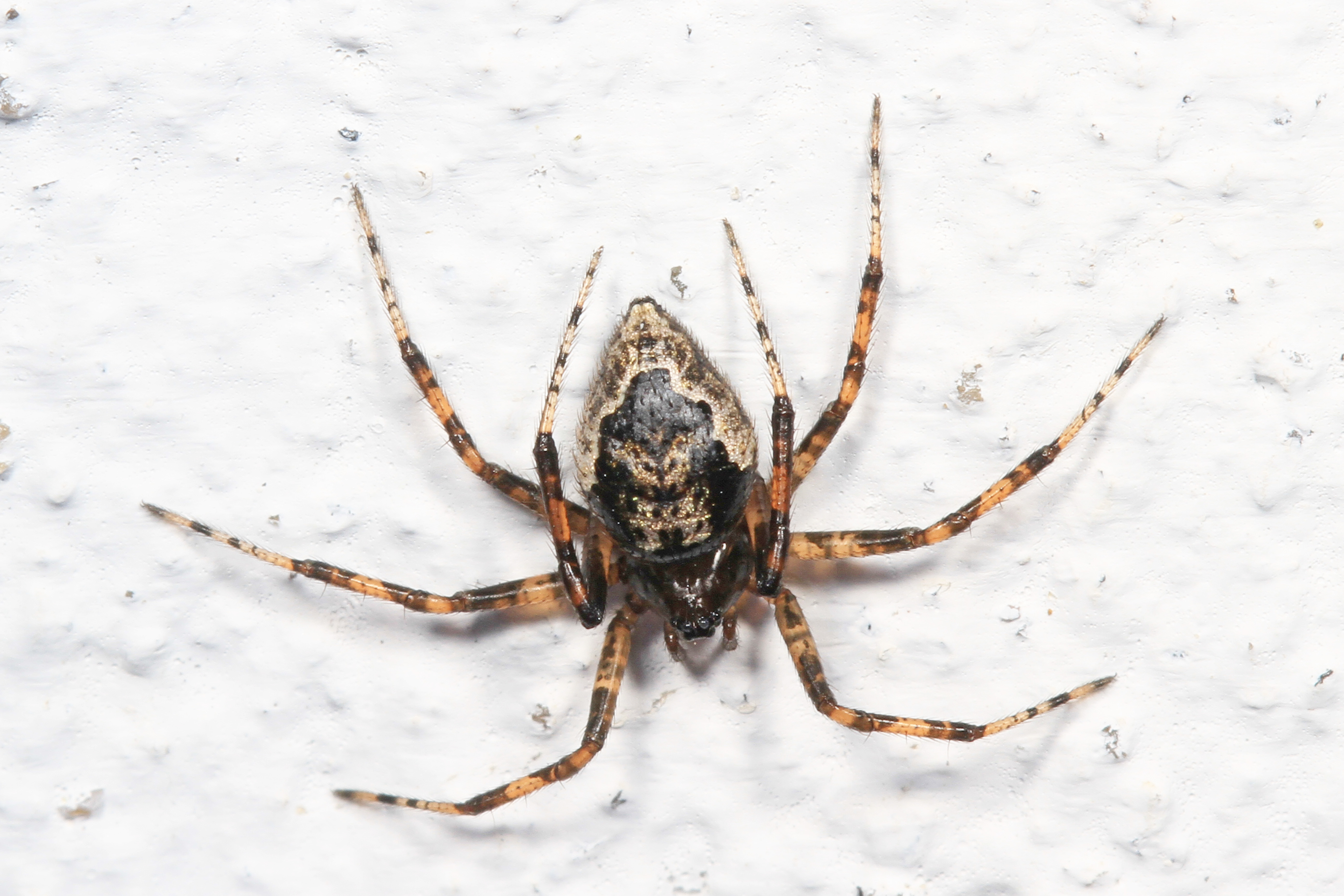
- D. funebris, Virginia
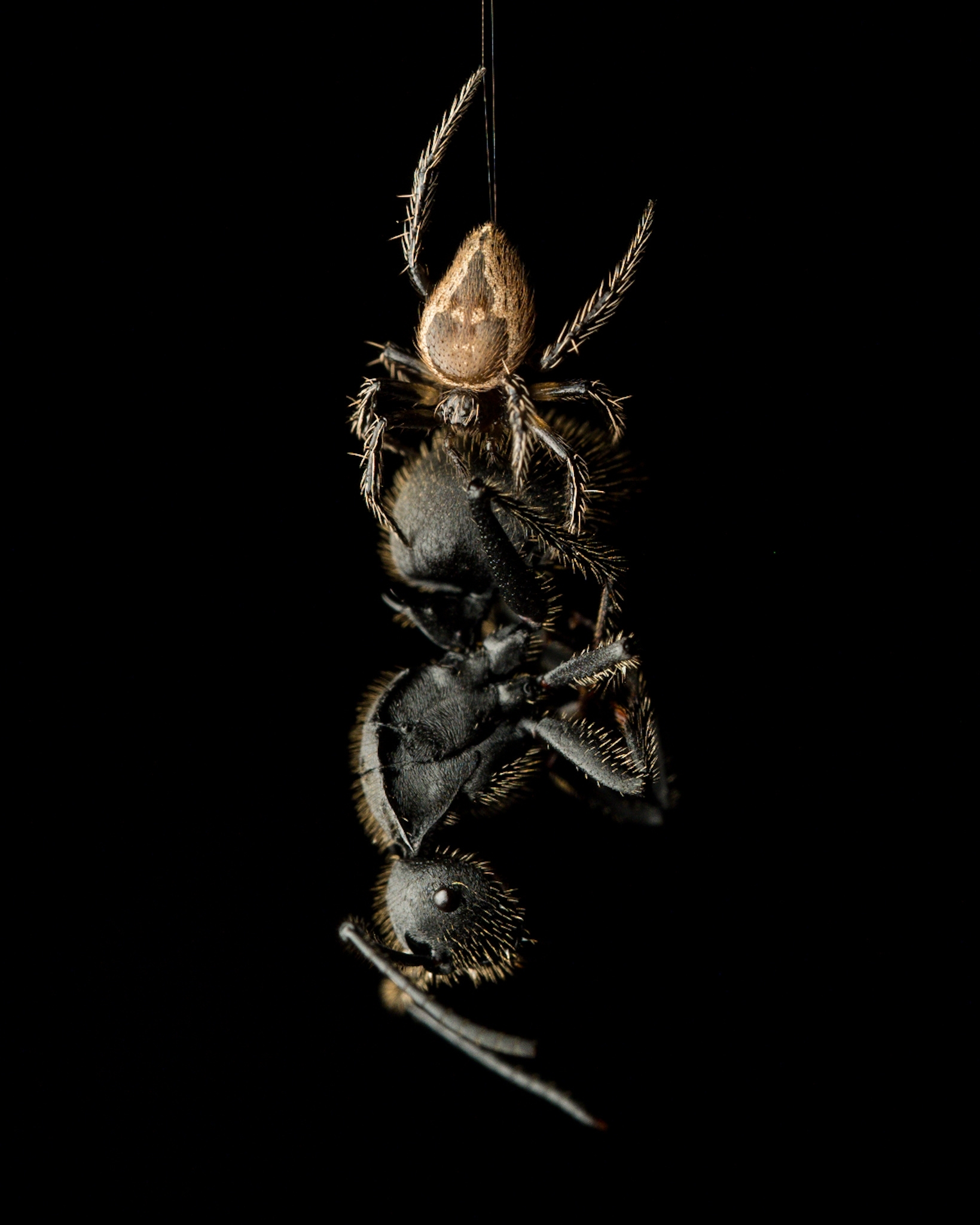
- Dipoenoides taczanowskii, China

Scientific classification
- Kingdom: Animalia
- Phylum: Arthropoda
- Subphylum: Chelicerata
- Class: Arachnida
- Order: Araneae
- Infraorder: Araneomorphae
- Family: Theridiidae
- Genus: Dipoenoides; Chamberlin, 1925

Type species
- Dipoenoides scriptipes (Banks, 1908)

Species
- 35, see text

Synonyms
- Acanthomysmena Mello-Leitão, 1944; Atkinia Strand, 1929 (removed from S of Dipoena Thorell, 1869); Diaprocorus Simon, 1895; Emertonella Bryant, 1945; Euryopis Menge, 1868; Mufila Bryant, 1949; Phylarchus Simon, 1889

= Dipoenoides =

Dipoenoides Temporal range: Palaeogene– Present

Genus of spiders

Dipoenoides is a genus of cobweb or comb-footed spiders in the family Theridiidae. There are more than 30 described species in Dipoenoides.

Dipoenoides was formed in the 2026 reorganization of the genus Euryopis, in which the majority of Euryopis species were assigned to the genus Dipoenoides.

== Description ==
Species in this genus are found worldwide.

== Species ==
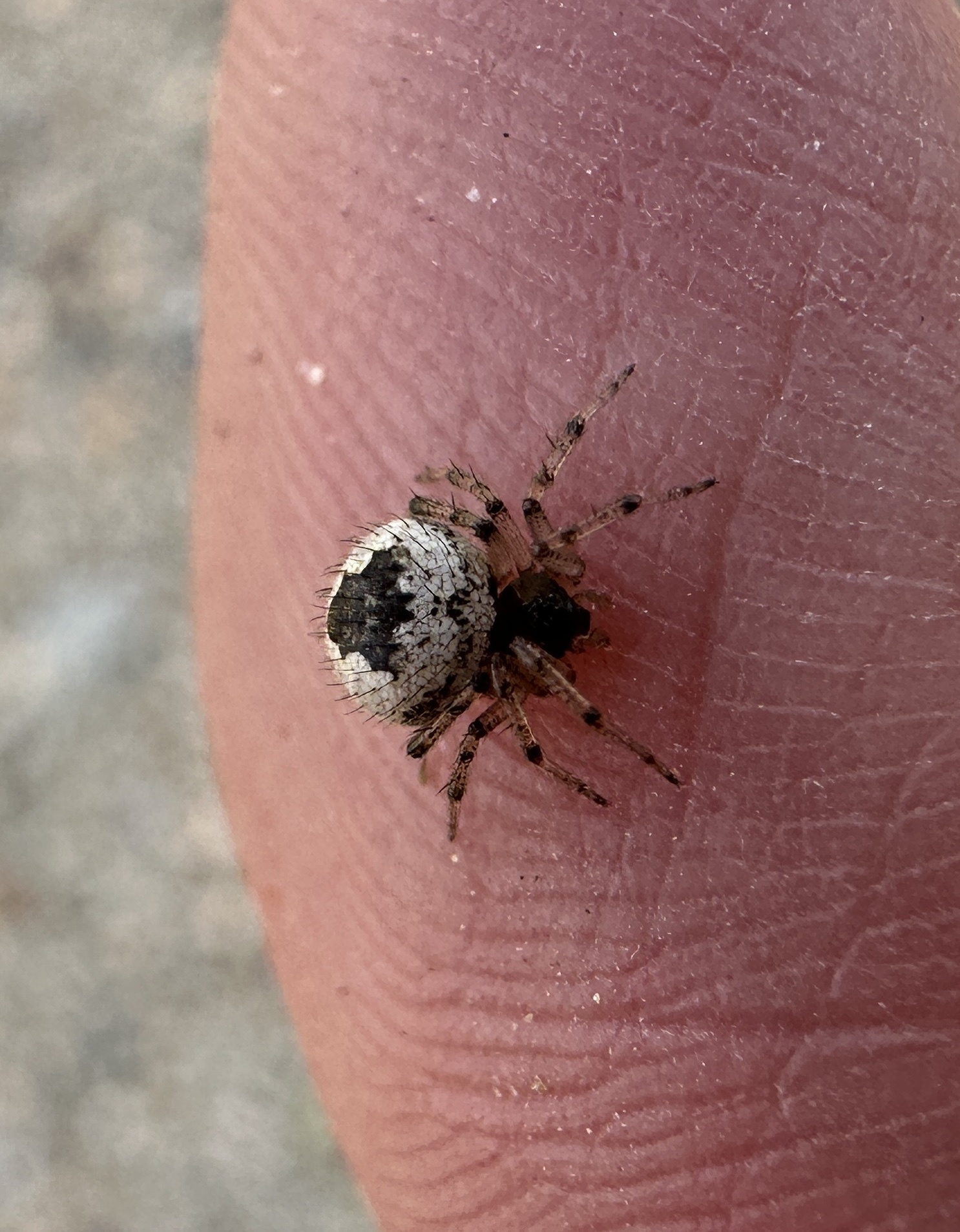
Dipoenoides californicus, California

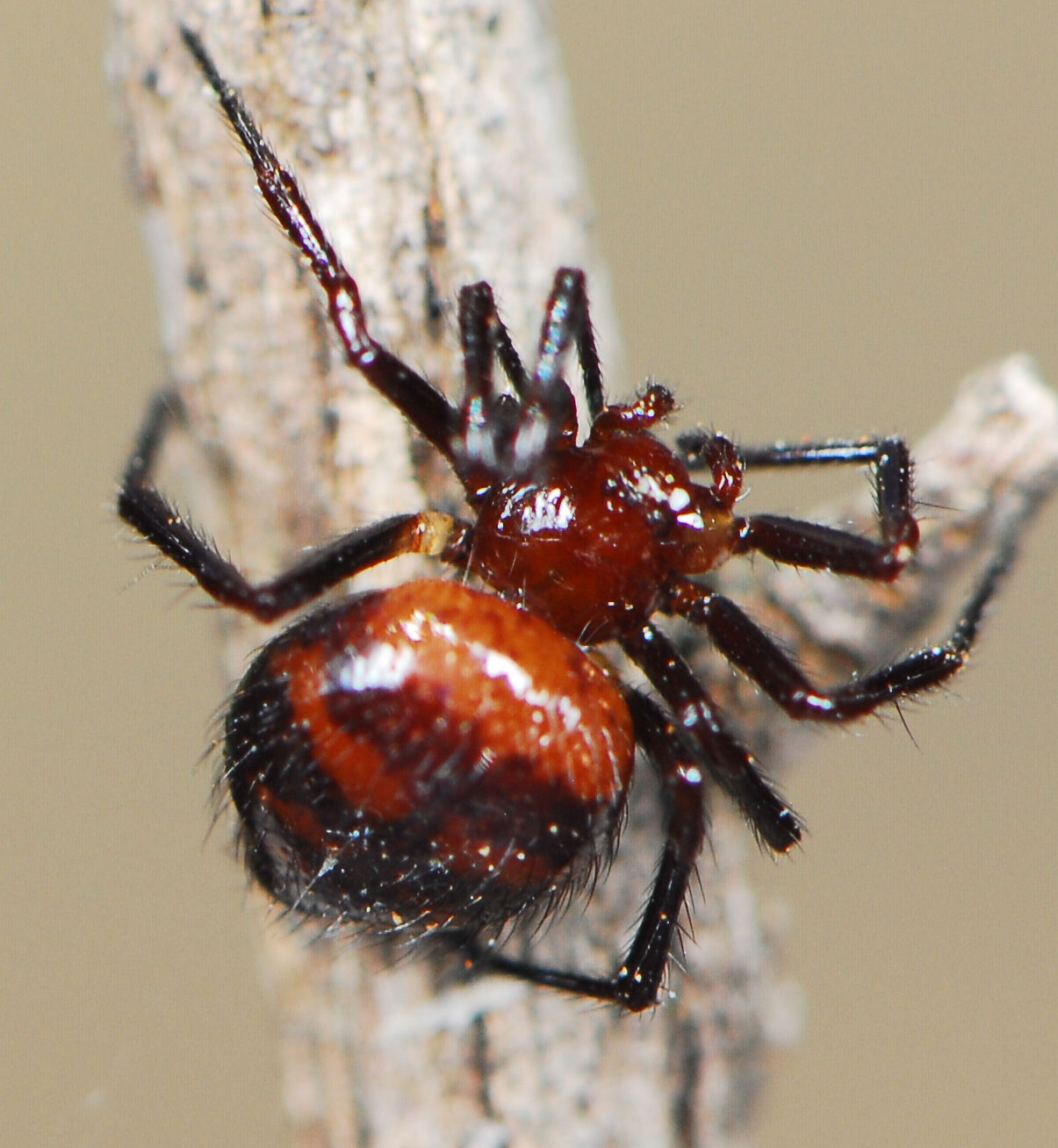
female Dipoenoides episinoides

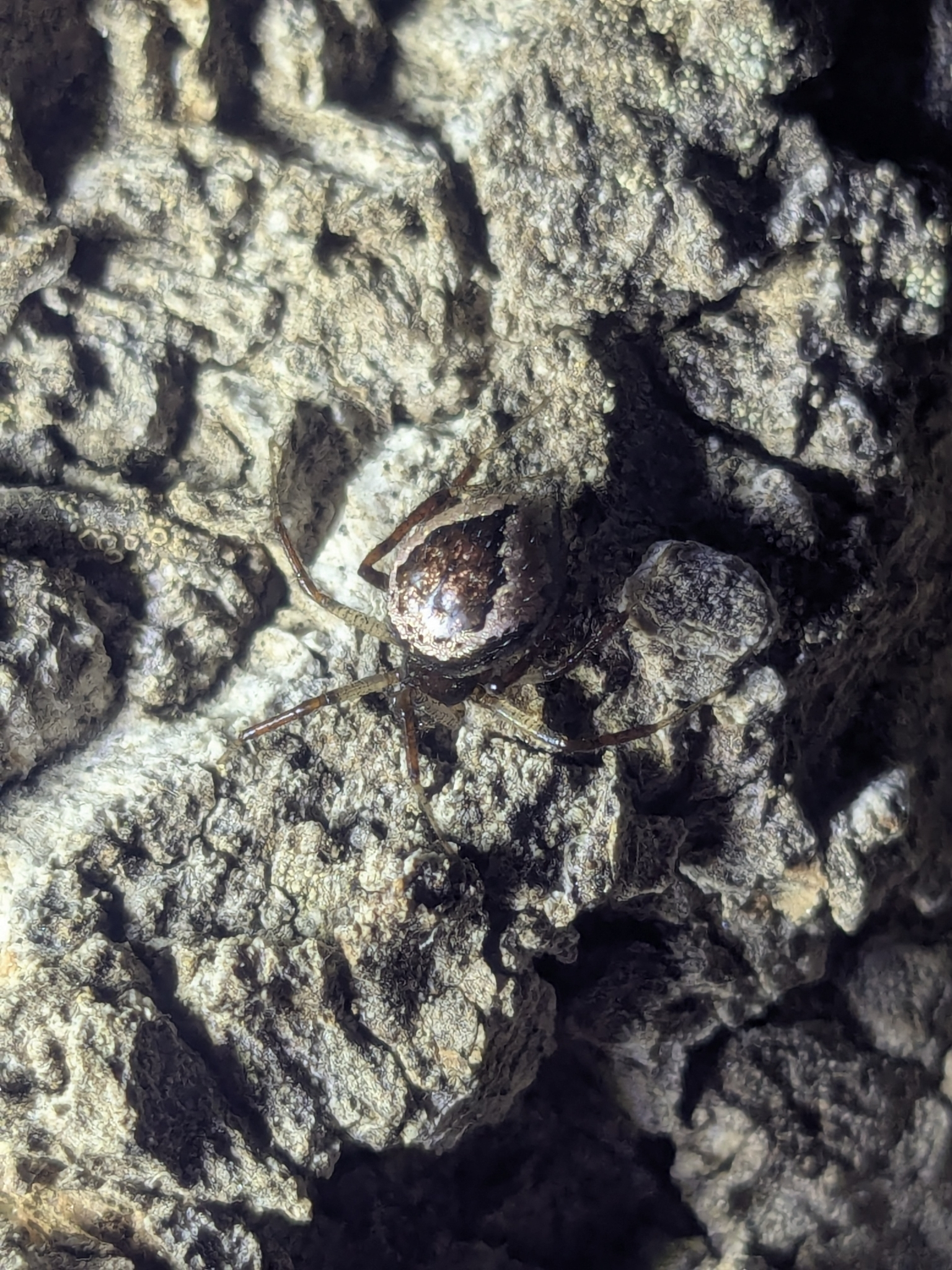
Dipoenoides formosus, California

As of October 2026, these 36 species belong to the genus Dipoenoides:

- Dipoenoides boliviensis (Rodrigues, Marta & Figueiredo, 2021) - Bolivia
- Dipoenoides californicus (Banks, 1904) - USA, Mexico
- Dipoenoides camis (Levi, 1963) - Brazil
- Dipoenoides catarinensis (Rodrigues, Marta & Figueiredo, 2021) - Brazil
- Dipoenoides cobreensis (Levi, 1963) - Jamaica
- Dipoenoides coki (Levi, 1954) - USA
- Dipoenoides cyclosisa (Zhu & Song, 1997) - China
- Dipoenoides deplanatus (Schenkel, 1936) - Pakistan, India, China
- Dipoenoides emertoni (Bryant, 1933) - USA, Mexico
- Dipoenoides emiliae (Lecigne, 2023) - Greece
- Dipoenoides episinoides (Walckenaer, 1847) (ant-eating theridiid) - Cape Verde, Mediterranean to Turkey, Georgia, Israel. Introduced to South Africa, Reunion, India, China
- Dipoenoides formosus (Banks, 1908) (inland triangular cobweaver) - Canada, USA
- Dipoenoides funebris (Hentz, 1850) (eastern triangular cobweaver) - Canada, USA. Introduced to South Africa
- Dipoenoides lineatipes (O. Pickard-Cambridge, 1893) - USA to Colombia
- Dipoenoides mallah (Zakerzade, Moradmand & Jäger, 2022) - Iran
- Dipoenoides mulaiki (Levi, 1954) - USA, Mexico
- Dipoenoides nasutus (Rodrigues, Marta & Figueiredo, 2021) - Brazil
- Dipoenoides niger (Yoshida, 2000) - Japan
- Dipoenoides pepini (Levi, 1954) - Canada, USA
- Dipoenoides pickardi (Levi, 1963) - Jamaica, Panama to Peru
- Dipoenoides quinqueguttatus (Thorell, 1875) - Europe, Egypt, Caucasus, Iran, Turkmenistan
- Dipoenoides quinquemaculatus (Banks, 1900) - USA
- Dipoenoides schwendingeri (Zamani & Marusik, 2021) - Turkey, Iraq, Iran, Armenia
- Dipoenoides scriptipes (Banks, 1908) - Canada, USA, Mexico
- Dipoenoides serrulatus (Gao & Li, 2014) - China
- Dipoenoides sexmaculatus (Hu, 2001) - China
- Dipoenoides spinifer (Mello-Leitão, 1944) - Brazil, Argentina
- Dipoenoides spiniger (O. Pickard-Cambridge, 1895) - USA to Colombia
- Dipoenoides spiritus (Levi, 1954) - USA
- Dipoenoides taczanowskii (Keyserling, 1886) - USA to Argentina. Introduced to Pakistan, India, Sri Lanka, China, Japan (Ryukyu Is.), New Guinea?
- Dipoenoides talaveraensis (González, 1991) - Argentina
- Dipoenoides tavara (Levi, 1954) - USA
- Dipoenoides texanus (Banks, 1908) - USA, Mexico
- Dipoenoides trachypus (Gao & Li, 2014) - China
- Dipoenoides varis (Levi, 1963) - USA
- Dipoenoides weesei (Levi, 1963) - USA
