= Lordomyrma vanua =

Scientific classification
- Domain: Eukaryota
- Kingdom: Animalia
- Phylum: Arthropoda
- Class: Insecta
- Order: Hymenoptera
- Family: Formicidae
- Subfamily: Myrmicinae
- Genus: Lordomyrma
- Species: L. vanua

Binomial name
- Lordomyrma vanua Lucky & Sarnat, 2008

Species of ant

Lordomyrma vanua (named after its type locality Vanua Levu) is a species of ant in the subfamily Myrmicinae.

Lordomyrma vanua, with its heavily rugose head and mesosoma, is similar to L. rugosa, but can be distinguished by its smooth forecoxae, smooth propodeal declivity, smooth anteriodorsal region of the promesonotum, broader and more widely spaced rugae, and larger size. The other species with which L. vanua might be confused is L. striatella, from which it can be separated by its weaker antenna scrobe, broader and more widely spaced rugae, more well developed propodeal spines, more robust petiole and larger size.

Despite its morphological resemblance to L. rugosa, molecular phylogenetic analyses place L. vanua as a closer relative to species such as L. tortuosa, L. striatella and L. vuda. Thus far, L. vanua has been collected only twice, both times from the litter of Mt. Delaikoro on Vanua Levu.
