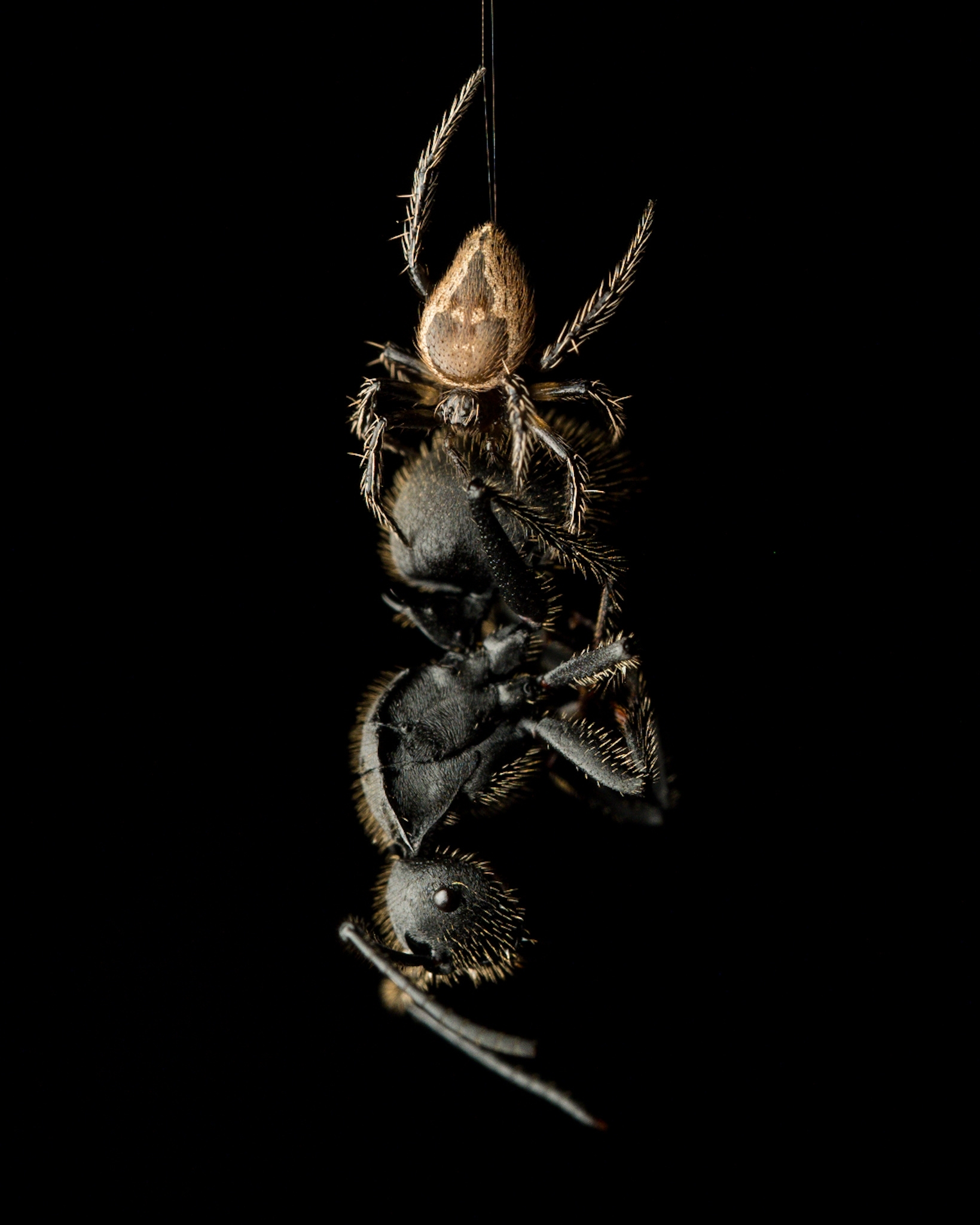
- Dipoenoides taczanowskii, China

Scientific classification
- Kingdom: Animalia
- Phylum: Arthropoda
- Subphylum: Chelicerata
- Class: Arachnida
- Order: Araneae
- Infraorder: Araneomorphae
- Family: Theridiidae
- Genus: Dipoenoides
- Species: D. taczanowskii

Binomial name
- Dipoenoides taczanowskii (Keyserling, 1886)

Synonyms
- Dipoenoides dentatus (Gertsch & Mulaik, 1936); Dipoenoides floricola (Keyserling, 1886); Dipoenoides nigripes (Banks, 1929); Dipoenoides rosascostai (Mello-Leitão, 1944); Emertonella taczanowskii (Keyserling, 1886); Euryopis dentata Gertsch & Mulaik, 1936b; Euryopis floricola Keyserling, 1886b; Euryopis nigripes Banks, 1929; Euryopis rosascostai Mello-Leitão, 1944b; Euryopis taczanowskii Keyserling, 1886b

= Dipoenoides taczanowskii =

Species of spiders

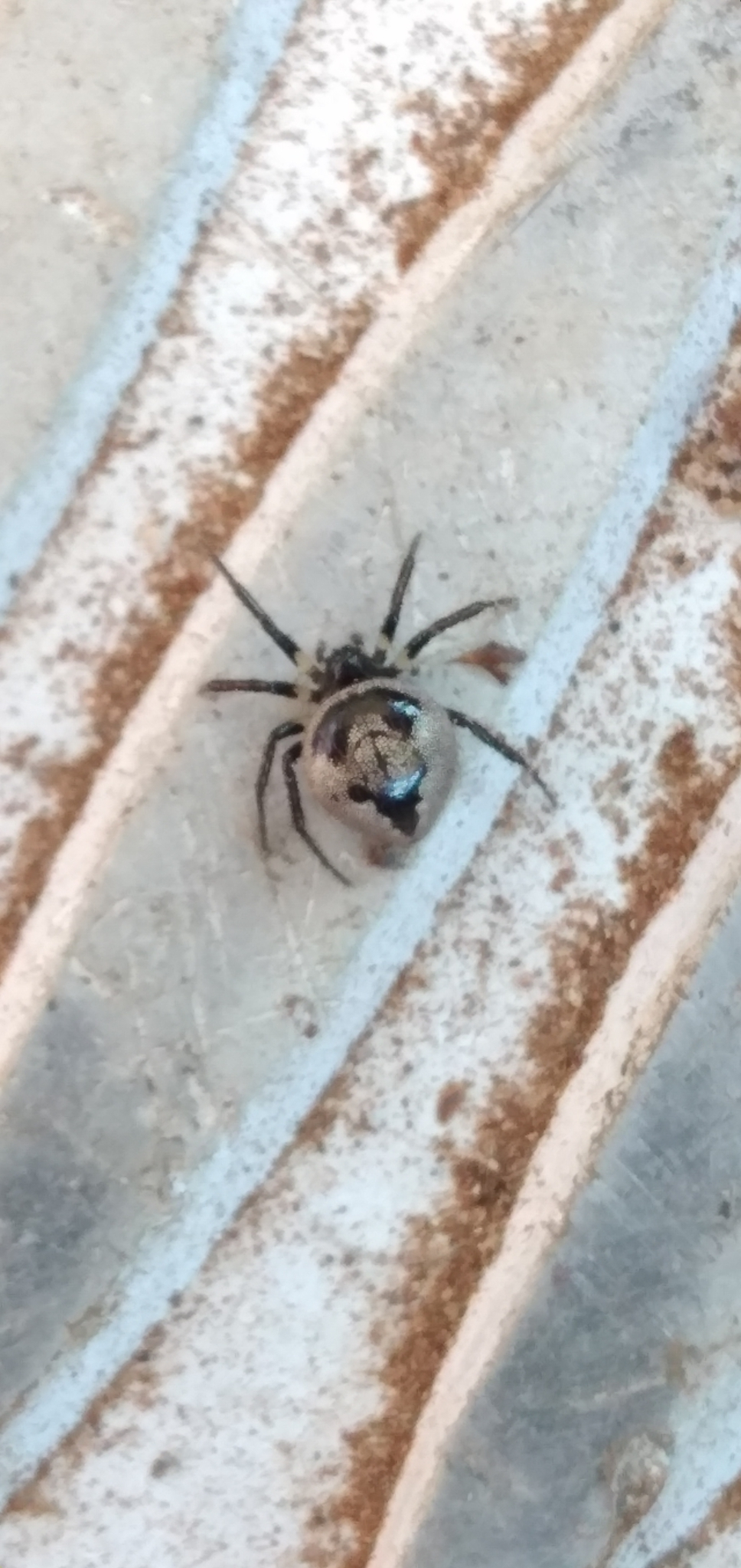
Dipoenoides taczanowskii, Brazil

Dipoenoides taczanowskii is a species of spider in the family Theridiidae. It is found in North, Central, and South America, and has been introduced to Pakistan, India, Sri Lanka, China, Ryukyu Islands of Japan, and possibly New Guinea.
