= Anatea =

- Anatea formicaria

Scientific classification
- Kingdom: Animalia
- Phylum: Arthropoda
- Subphylum: Chelicerata
- Class: Arachnida
- Order: Araneae
- Infraorder: Araneomorphae
- Family: Theridiidae
- Genus: Anatea; Berland, 1927

Type species
- A. formicaria Berland, 1927

Species
- A. elongata Smith, 2017 – Australia (Queensland); A. formicaria Berland, 1927 – New Caledonia; A. monteithi Smith, 2017 – Australia (Queensland)

Genus of spiders

Anatea is an ant-mimicking genus of South Pacific comb-footed spiders that was first described by Lucien Berland in 1927. As of May 2020 it contains three species, found in Australia and on New Caledonia:

- Anatea

- Anatea elongata
- Anatea formicaria
- Anatea monteithi

Originally placed with the sac spiders, it was moved to the comb-footed spiders in 1967. Previously considered as a genus with a single species, two new species were identified in tropical Australia in 2017. Myrmecomorphy is found amongst the salticids and Corinnidae families, but it is unusual amongst other theridiids.
