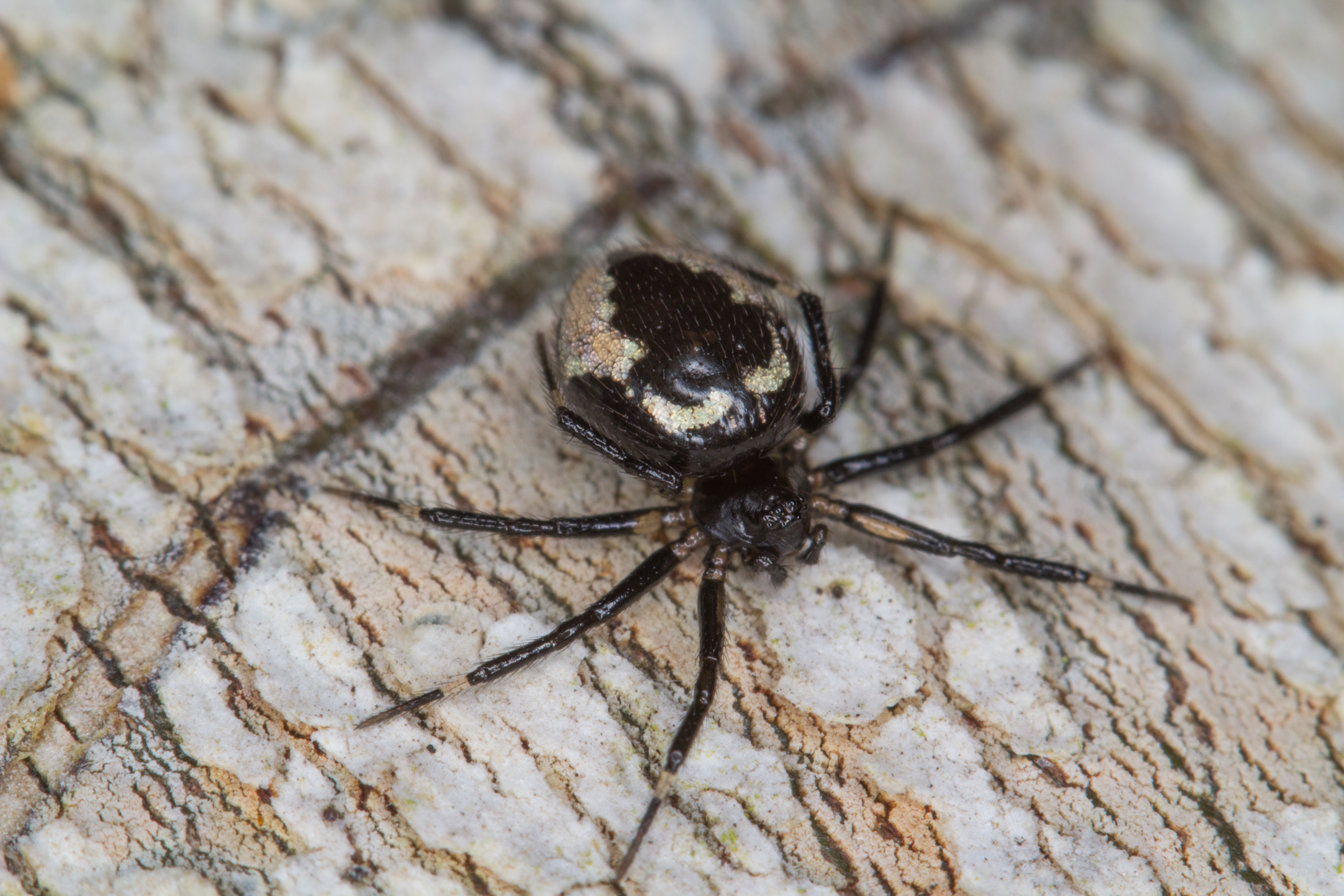

Scientific classification
- Domain: Eukaryota
- Kingdom: Animalia
- Phylum: Arthropoda
- Subphylum: Chelicerata
- Class: Arachnida
- Order: Araneae
- Infraorder: Araneomorphae
- Family: Theridiidae
- Genus: Euryopis
- Species: E. splendens

Binomial name
- Euryopis splendens Rainbow 1916

Synonyms
- Phylarchus splendens; Steatoda splendens

= Euryopis splendens =

Species of spider

Euryopis splendens is a species of comb-footed spider in the family Theridiidae. The range of distribution is the south east of Australia. The spider lives under stones or bark.

The body length of the female is 5.5 mm, the male 4.5 mm. The body is coloured dark brown to black, with a golden yellow stripe or patten on the abdomen. Food is small ground dwelling insects, particularly ants. The egg sac is globose in shape, 5 mm in diameter, of fluffy white silk. Eggs are deep cream in colour, 0.5 mm in diameter, not glutinous and around 18 to 25 eggs per egg sac. The egg sac is suspended or attached under a rock. William Rainbow described the species in 1916 from specimens from Sydney.
