= Euryopis elegans =

Scientific classification
- Domain: Eukaryota
- Kingdom: Animalia
- Phylum: Arthropoda
- Subphylum: Chelicerata
- Class: Arachnida
- Order: Araneae
- Infraorder: Araneomorphae
- Family: Theridiidae
- Genus: Euryopis
- Species: E. elegans

Binomial name
- Euryopis elegans Keyserling, 1890

Species of spider

Euryopis elegans is a species of spiders in the family Theridiidae, the tangle-web spiders.

It is found on the East coast of Australia.
