= Euryopis nana =

Conservation status
- Not Threatened (NZ TCS)

Scientific classification
- Kingdom: Animalia
- Phylum: Arthropoda
- Subphylum: Chelicerata
- Class: Arachnida
- Order: Araneae
- Infraorder: Araneomorphae
- Family: Theridiidae
- Genus: Euryopis
- Species: E. nana

Binomial name
- Euryopis nana (O. Pickard-Cambridge, 1880)

Synonyms
- Atkinsonia nana Theridium pusillulum Dipoena nana Atkinia nana

Species of spider

Euryopis nana is a species of Theridiidae spider endemic to New Zealand.

== Taxonomy ==
This species was described in 1880 by Octavius Pickard-Cambridge from male specimens. It was most recently revised in 1951.

== Distribution ==
This species is only known from New Zealand.

== Conservation status ==
Under the New Zealand Threat Classification System, this species is listed as "Not Threatened".
