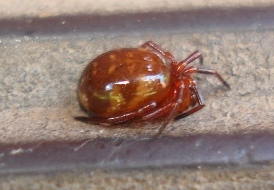

Scientific classification
- Kingdom: Animalia
- Phylum: Arthropoda
- Subphylum: Chelicerata
- Class: Arachnida
- Order: Araneae
- Infraorder: Araneomorphae
- Family: Theridiidae
- Genus: Euryopis
- Species: E. flavomaculata

Binomial name
- Euryopis flavomaculata (C. L. Koch, 1836)

Synonyms
- Micryphantes flavomaculatus C. L. Koch, 1836; Euryopis flava Wiehle, 1960

= Euryopis flavomaculata =

Species of spider

Euryopis flavomaculata is a tangle-web spider species with Palearctic distribution. It is notably found in Lithuania.

It is the type species of the genus Euryopis. The type locality is Regensburg, Germany.
