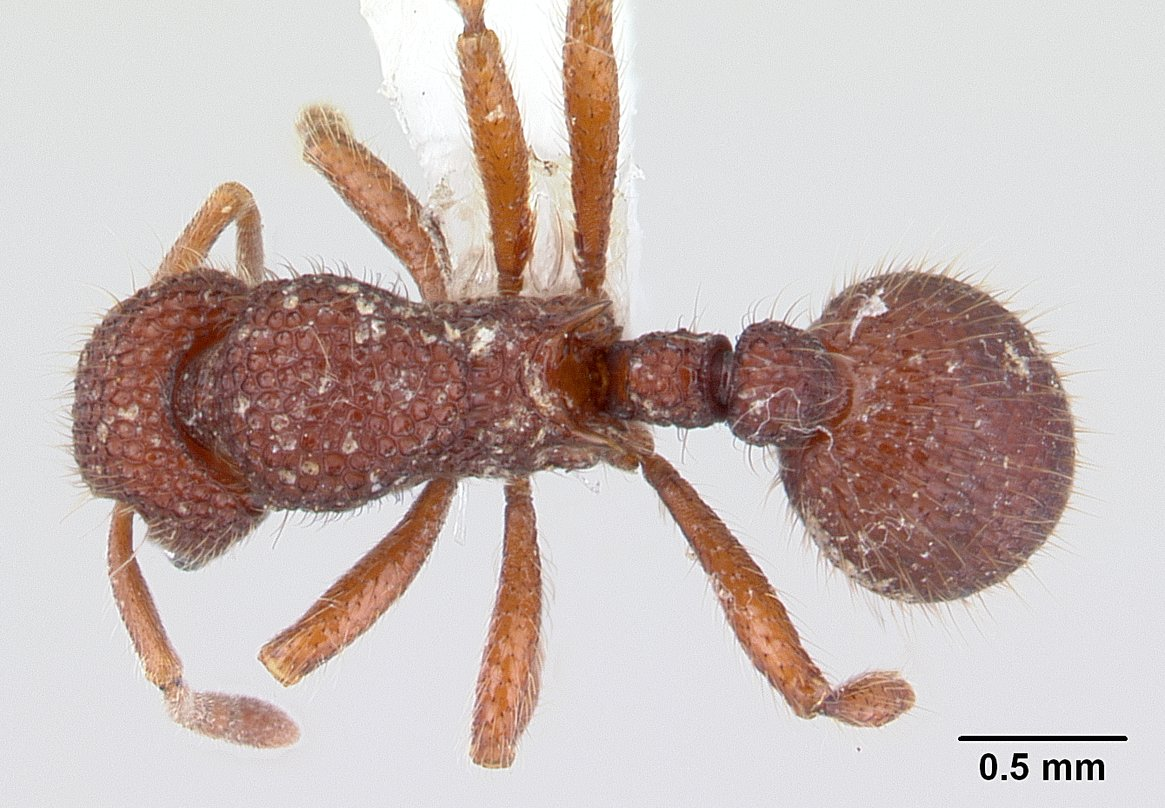
- Lordomyrma reticulata worker from Malaysia

Scientific classification
- Domain: Eukaryota
- Kingdom: Animalia
- Phylum: Arthropoda
- Class: Insecta
- Order: Hymenoptera
- Family: Formicidae
- Subfamily: Myrmicinae
- Genus: Lordomyrma
- Species: L. reticulata

Binomial name
- Lordomyrma reticulata Lucky & Sarnat, 2008

= Lordomyrma reticulata =

Species of ant

Lordomyrma reticulata is a species of ant in the subfamily Myrmicinae.

== Description ==
Lordomyrma reticulata can be recognized by the deep and regular reticulating sculpture on the head and mesosoma, which becomes shallower on the gaster both dorsally and ventrally. The clypeus is distinctly rugose and convex, with a pair of strong carinae that converge centrally and diverge anteriorly and posteriorly, forming an hourglass shape. The sculpture of the broadly impressed scrobe and of the forecoxae is finely rugoreticulate. Scapes and legs are shallowly sculptured rather than smooth and shining. The undersides of the femora, petiole and scapes bear longitudinal concavities, presumably for reception of retracted limbs. Pilosity on head and body is pale and erect to suberect.

Of all described congeners L. reticulata most closely resembles the Japanese L. azumai, which is also heavily sculptured in a regularly intersecting rugoreticulate pattern on head, alitrunk and gaster. Lordomyrma reticulata is distinguished by the shape of the petiole, as the peduncle is clearly shorter than the length of the node whereas L. azumai presents a distinctly elongate peduncle. Among other undescribed Lordomyrma known to occur in Borneo L. reticulata would appear to be distinguished by the combination of sculpturation on the forecoxae, the regular rugoreticulations on the gaster and pale yellow standing pilosity common on most of the body.
