= Anatea elongata =

Scientific classification
- Domain: Eukaryota
- Kingdom: Animalia
- Phylum: Arthropoda
- Subphylum: Chelicerata
- Class: Arachnida
- Order: Araneae
- Infraorder: Araneomorphae
- Family: Theridiidae
- Genus: Anatea
- Species: A. elongata

Binomial name
- Anatea elongata Smith, 2017

Species of spider

Anatea elongata is a species of comb-footed spider in the family Theridiidae. It is found in Queensland.
