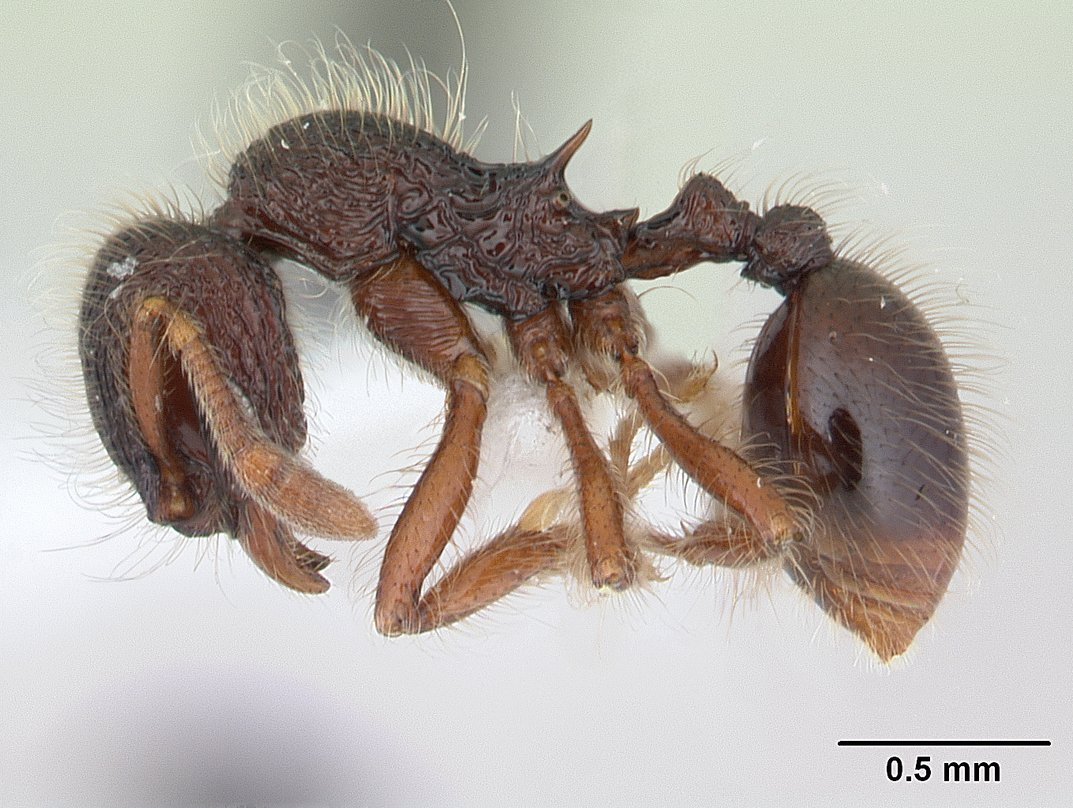

Scientific classification
- Domain: Eukaryota
- Kingdom: Animalia
- Phylum: Arthropoda
- Class: Insecta
- Order: Hymenoptera
- Family: Formicidae
- Subfamily: Myrmicinae
- Genus: Lachnomyrmex
- Species: L. laticeps

Binomial name
- Lachnomyrmex laticeps Feitosa, R. M. & Brandao, C. R. F., 2008

= Lachnomyrmex laticeps =

Species of ant

Lachnomyrmex laticeps is a species of ant in the subfamily Myrmicinae.
