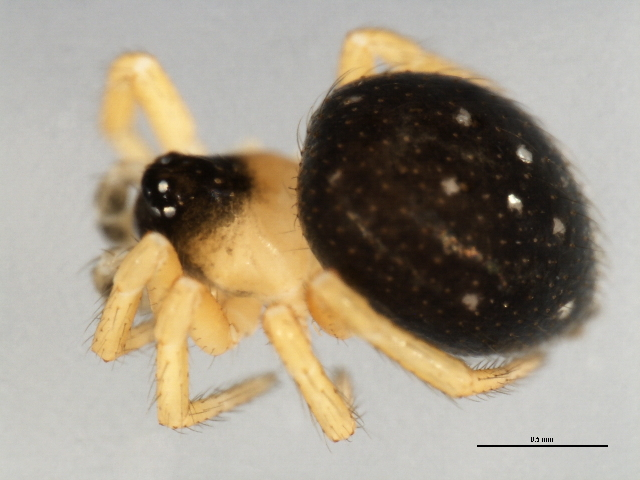
- E. argentea, adult male
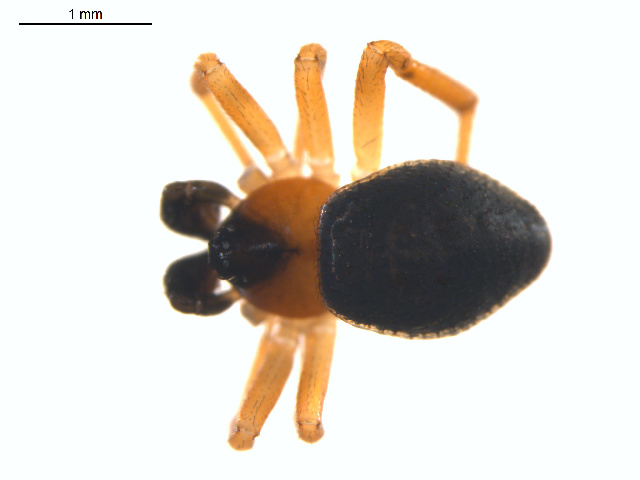
- E. argentea, adult male

Scientific classification
- Domain: Eukaryota
- Kingdom: Animalia
- Phylum: Arthropoda
- Subphylum: Chelicerata
- Class: Arachnida
- Order: Araneae
- Infraorder: Araneomorphae
- Family: Theridiidae
- Genus: Euryopis
- Species: E. argentea

Binomial name
- Euryopis argentea Emerton, 1882

= Euryopis argentea =

Species of spider

Euryopis argentea is a species of cobweb spider in the family Theridiidae. It is found in the United States, Canada, and Russia.
