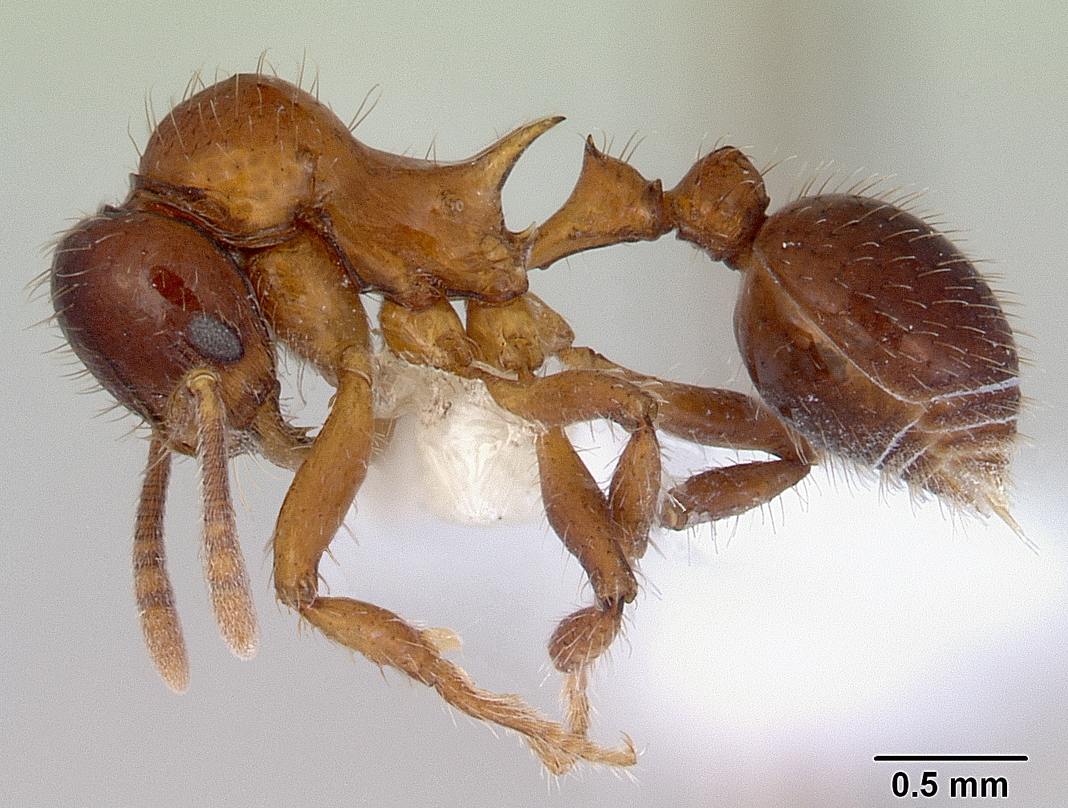
- Lordomyrma furcifera worker form Papua New Guinea

Scientific classification
- Domain: Eukaryota
- Kingdom: Animalia
- Phylum: Arthropoda
- Class: Insecta
- Order: Hymenoptera
- Family: Formicidae
- Subfamily: Myrmicinae
- Tribe: Crematogastrini
- Genus: Lordomyrma; Emery, 1897

Type species
- Lordomyrma furcifera (Note: The type species is Lordomyrma furcifera (by subsequent designation of Wheeler (1911)), not Podomyrma caledonica, an incorrect subsequent designation by Wheeler (1919).) Emery, 1897

Diversity
- 34 species

Synonyms
- Prodicroaspis Emery, 1914; Promeranoplus Emery, 1914

= Lordomyrma =

Genus of ants

Lordomyrma is a genus of ants in the subfamily Myrmicinae.

== Distribution and habitat ==
The genus is known principally from Melanesia and Australia, with the one exception to this otherwise circumscribed distribution being the single species L. azumai from Japan. Most species are denizens of the leaf litter in wet forest habitat, but some are known to nest and forage arboreally.

== Description ==
Members of the genus are small and inconspicuous, maintain colonies of modest size and tend to be shy and retiring when disturbed.

== Species ==
- Lordomyrma accuminata Stitz, 1912
- Lordomyrma azumai (Santschi, 1941)
- Lordomyrma bhutanensis (Baroni Urbani, 1977)
- Lordomyrma caledonica (André, 1889)
- Lordomyrma crawleyi Menozzi, 1923
- Lordomyrma cryptocera Emery, 1897
- Lordomyrma curvata Sarnat, 2006
- Lordomyrma desupra Sarnat, 2006
- Lordomyrma diwata Taylor, 2012
- Lordomyrma emarginata Taylor, 2012
- Lordomyrma epinotalis (Mann, 1919)
- Lordomyrma furcifera Emery, 1897
- Lordomyrma hmong Taylor, 2012
- Lordomyrma idianale Taylor, 2012
- Lordomyrma infundibuli Donisthorpe, 1940
- Lordomyrma lakshmi Taylor, 2012
- Lordomyrma leae Wheeler, 1919
- Lordomyrma levifrons (Mann, 1921)
- Lordomyrma limatula Taylor, 2012
- Lordomyrma nigra Donisthorpe, 1941
- Lordomyrma polita (Mann, 1921)
- Lordomyrma punctiventris Wheeler, 1919
- Lordomyrma reticulata Lucky & Sarnat, 2008
- Lordomyrma rouxi (Emery, 1914)
- Lordomyrma rugosa (Mann, 1921)
- Lordomyrma sarasini (Emery, 1914)
- Lordomyrma sinensis (Ma, Xu, Makio & DuBois, 2007)
- Lordomyrma stoneri (Mann, 1925)
- Lordomyrma striatella (Mann, 1921)
- Lordomyrma sukuna Sarnat, 2006
- Lordomyrma taylori Bharti & Ali, 2013
- Lordomyrma tortuosa (Mann, 1921)
- Lordomyrma vanua Lucky & Sarnat, 2008
- Lordomyrma vuda Sarnat, 2006
