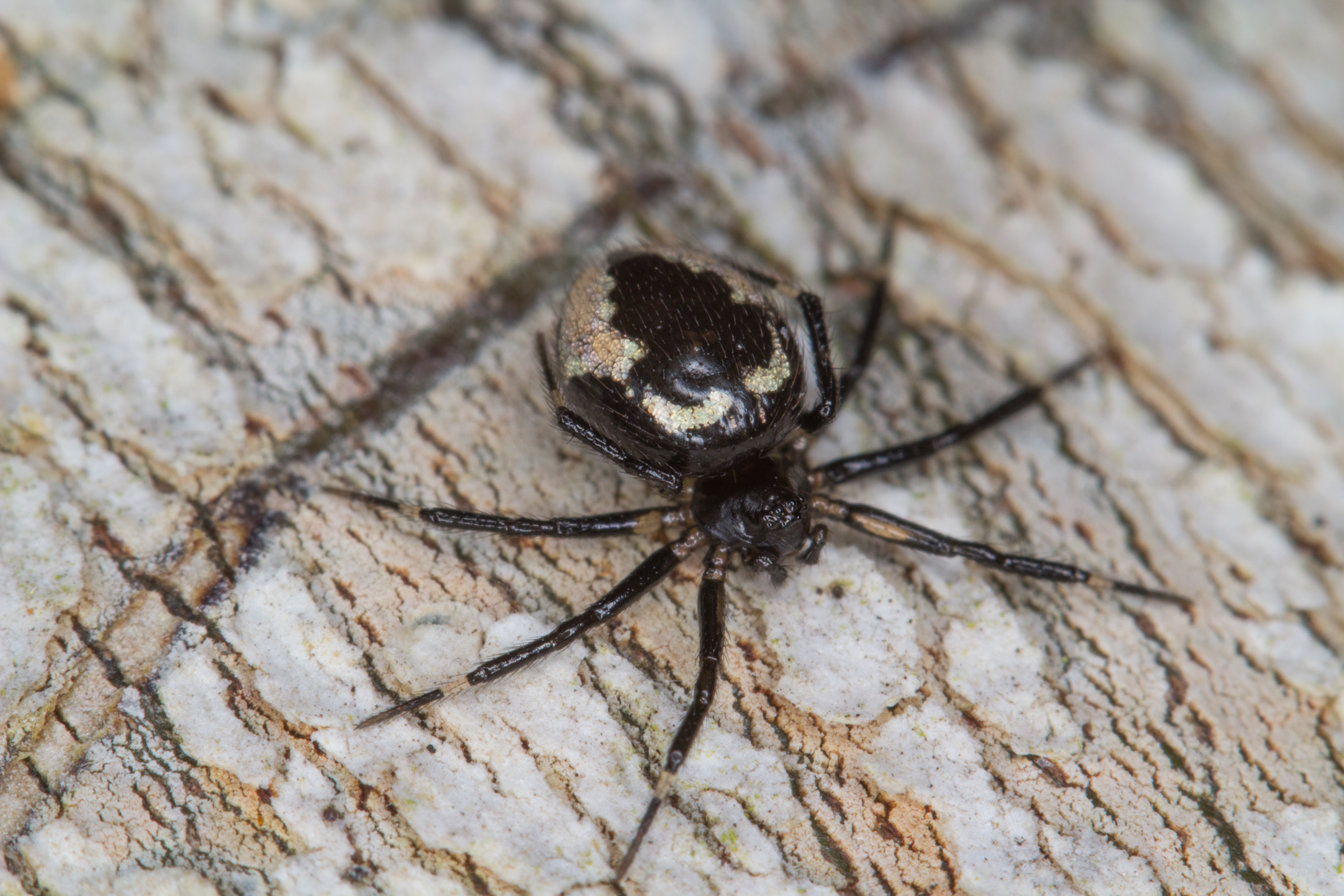
- Euryopis splendens, Splendid Tick Spider

Scientific classification
- Kingdom: Animalia
- Phylum: Arthropoda
- Subphylum: Chelicerata
- Class: Arachnida
- Order: Araneae
- Infraorder: Araneomorphae
- Family: Theridiidae
- Genus: Euryopis; Menge, 1868

Synonyms
- Acanthomysmena Mello-Leitão, 1944; Atkinia Strand, 1929; Atkinsonia O. Pickard-Cambridge, 1880; Diaprocorus Simon, 1894; Mufila Bryant, 1949; Phylarchus Simon, 1889

= Euryopis =

Genus of spiders

Euryopis is a genus of cobweb or comb-footed spiders in the family Theridiidae. There are more than 40 described species in Euryopis.

== Species ==
As of October 2026, these 49 species belong to the genus Euryopis:

- Euryopis aeneocincta Simon, 1877
- Euryopis argentea Emerton, 1882 (Silver Cobweb Weaver)
- Euryopis bifascigera Strand, 1913
- Euryopis campestrata Simon, 1907
- Euryopis candiota Rodrigues, Marta & Figueiredo, 2021
- Euryopis chatchikovi Ponomarev, 2005
- Euryopis clara Ponomarev, 2005
- Euryopis dentigera Simon, 1880
- Euryopis duodecimguttata Caporiacco, 1950
- Euryopis elegans Keyserling, 1890 (Elegant Ant-eater Spider)
- Euryopis elenae González, 1991
- Euryopis estebani González, 1991
- Euryopis flavomaculata (C. L. Koch, 1836)
- Euryopis galeiforma Zhu, 1998
- Euryopis gertschi Levi, 1951
- Euryopis giordanii Caporiacco, 1950
- Euryopis hebraea Levy & Amitai, 1981
- Euryopis helcra Roberts, 1983
- Euryopis iharai Yoshida, 1992
- Euryopis jucunda Thorell, 1895
- Euryopis laeta (Westring, 1861)
- Euryopis levii Heimer, 1987
- Euryopis maga Simon, 1908
- Euryopis margaritata (L. Koch, 1867)
- Euryopis megalops (Caporiacco, 1934)
- Euryopis molopica Thorell, 1895
- Euryopis multipunctata (Simon, 1895)
- Euryopis mutoloi Caporiacco, 1948
- Euryopis nana (O. Pickard-Cambridge, 1880)
- Euryopis notabilis (Keyserling, 1891)
- Euryopis nubila Simon, 1889
- Euryopis octomaculata (Paik, 1995)
- Euryopis orsovensis Kulczyński, 1894
- Euryopis papula Kim, Lee & Yoo, 2020
- Euryopis perpusilla Ono, 2011
- Euryopis petricola (Hickman, 1951)
- Euryopis pilosa Miller, 1970
- Euryopis potteri Simon, 1901
- Euryopis praemitis Simon, 1909
- Euryopis promo González, 1991
- Euryopis sagittata (O. Pickard-Cambridge, 1885)
- Euryopis saukea Levi, 1951
- Euryopis sexalbomaculata (Lucas, 1846)
- Euryopis splendens (Rainbow, 1916) (Splendid Tick Spider)
- Euryopis splendida (Simon, 1889)
- Euryopis superba (Rainbow, 1896)
- Euryopis tribulata Simon, 1905
- Euryopis umbilicata L. Koch, 1872 (Superb Ant-eater Spider)
- Euryopis venutissima (Caporiacco, 1934)
