= Ariamnes birgitae =

Scientific classification
- Kingdom: Animalia
- Phylum: Arthropoda
- Subphylum: Chelicerata
- Class: Arachnida
- Order: Araneae
- Infraorder: Araneomorphae
- Family: Theridiidae
- Genus: Ariamnes
- Species: A. birgitae

Binomial name
- Ariamnes birgitae Strand, 1917

Species of spider

Ariamnes birgitae is a species of comb-footed spider in the family Theridiidae. It is found in Myanmar.
