= Ariamnes campestratus =

Whip Dew-Drop Spider

Scientific classification
- Kingdom: Animalia
- Phylum: Arthropoda
- Subphylum: Chelicerata
- Class: Arachnida
- Order: Araneae
- Infraorder: Araneomorphae
- Family: Theridiidae
- Genus: Ariamnes
- Species: A. campestratus

Binomial name
- Ariamnes campestratus Simon, 1903

Species of spider

Ariamnes campestratus is a species of spider in the family Theridiidae. It is commonly known as the whip dew-drop spider.

== Distribution ==
Ariamnes campestratus is found in Gabon, Congo, and South Africa.

In South Africa, it is recorded from the provinces KwaZulu-Natal and Limpopo. Locations include Oribi Gorge Nature Reserve, Royal Natal National Park, iSimangaliso Wetland Park (uMkuze Game Reserve), and Lekgalameetsi Nature Reserve.

== Habitat and ecology ==
This species was sampled from the Savanna biome at altitudes ranging from 8 to 1703 m.

== Conservation ==
Ariamnes campestratus is listed as Least Concern by the South African National Biodiversity Institute due to its wide geographical range. There are no significant threats to this species. It is protected in Oribi Gorge Nature Reserve, Royal Natal National Park, uMkuze Game Reserve, and Lekgalameetsi Nature Reserve.

== Taxonomy ==
Ariamnes campestratus was described by Eugène Simon in 1903 from Gabon. The species is known only from the female. Vanuytven, Jocqué, and Deeleman-Reinhold (2025) noted that this species is of uncertain placement and probably belongs to Rhomphaea.
