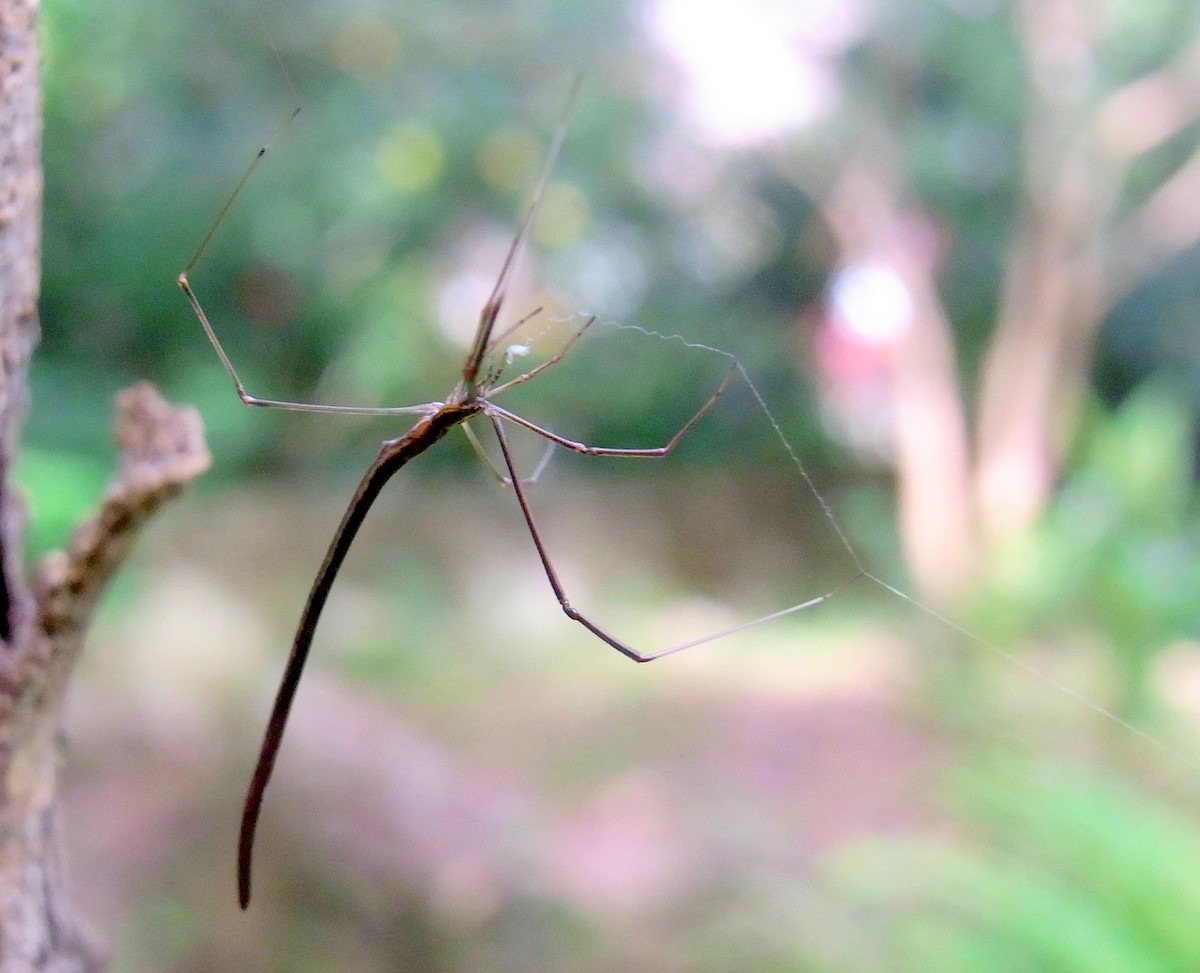
- Whip spider at Chatswood West, Australia

Scientific classification
- Domain: Eukaryota
- Kingdom: Animalia
- Phylum: Arthropoda
- Subphylum: Chelicerata
- Class: Arachnida
- Order: Araneae
- Infraorder: Araneomorphae
- Family: Theridiidae
- Genus: Ariamnes
- Species: A. colubrinus

Binomial name
- Ariamnes colubrinus (Keyserling, 1890)

Synonyms
- Argyrodes colubrinus

= Ariamnes colubrinus =

Species of spider

Ariamnes colubrinus, known as the whip spider, is a common Australian spider belonging to the family Theridiidae. It is found in Victoria, New South Wales and Queensland.

== Description ==
They are long and thin, often resembling a twig. The body length of males is 13 millimetres (0.51 in) and females is 22 mm (0.87 in). Body colour varies from cream, brown or greenish. They are often found around a metre above the ground, resembling a twig caught in a spider's web.

Their egg sacs are 4 by 3 mm (0.16 by 0.12 in) in size, with a small lip on the base. The egg sac is suspended from a single strong thread. 40 to 50 yellow green eggs per sac, eggs 0.7 mm in diameter.

== Hunting ==
They are often found resting on one or two threads of silk, waiting with a few strands of silk acting as a snare. Once their prey hits the silk, the whip spider descends. The spider then wraps their meal in silk. It mostly eats wandering spiders, most being juveniles, as well as some insects.
