= Ariamnes melekalikimaka =

Scientific classification
- Domain: Eukaryota
- Kingdom: Animalia
- Phylum: Arthropoda
- Subphylum: Chelicerata
- Class: Arachnida
- Order: Araneae
- Infraorder: Araneomorphae
- Family: Theridiidae
- Genus: Ariamnes
- Species: A. melekalikimaka

Binomial name
- Ariamnes melekalikimaka Gillespie & Rivera, 2007

Species of spider

Ariamnes melekalikimaka is a species of comb-footed spider in the family Theridiidae. It is found in Hawaii.
