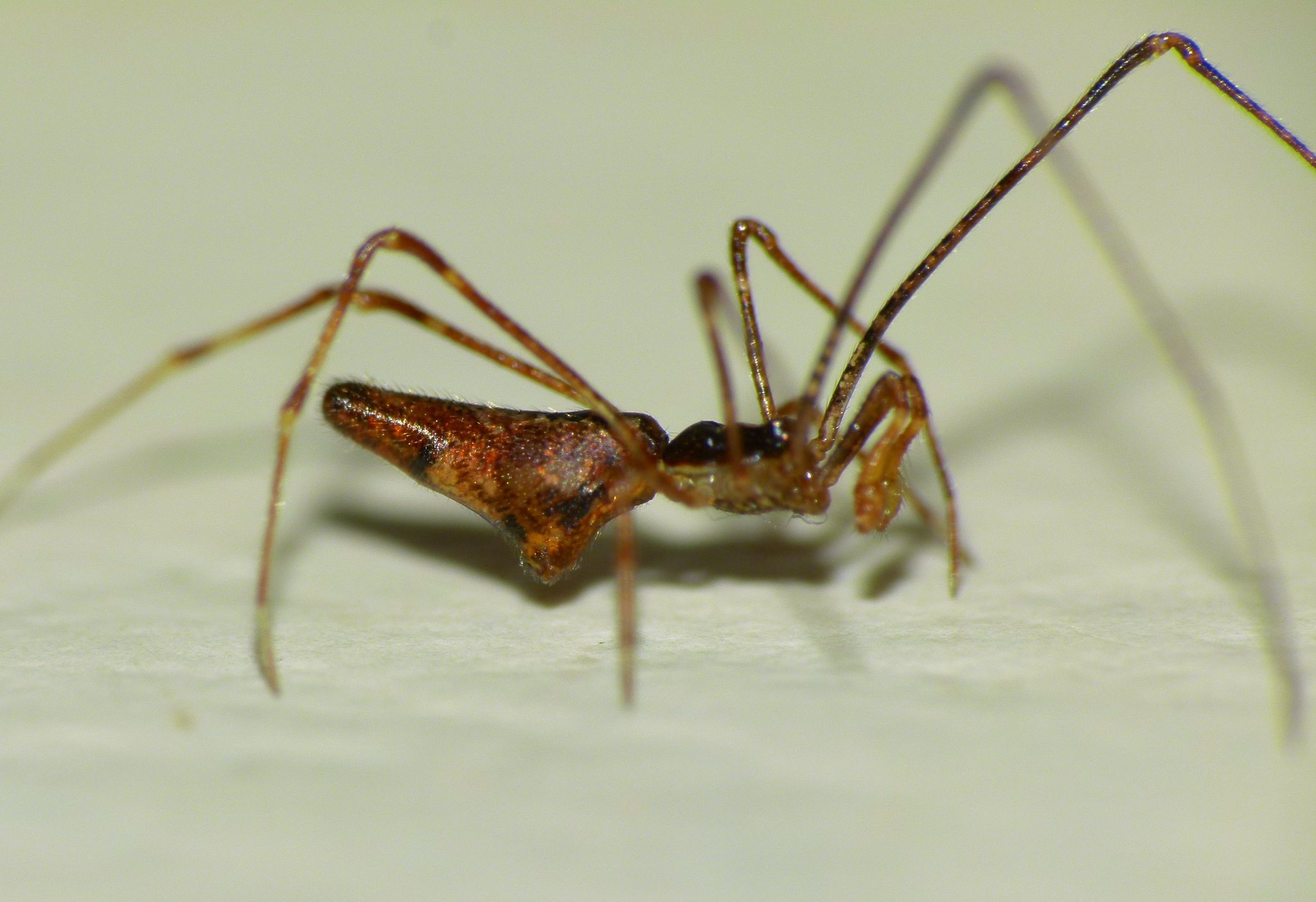

Conservation status
- Data Deficient (NZ TCS)

Scientific classification
- Domain: Eukaryota
- Kingdom: Animalia
- Phylum: Arthropoda
- Subphylum: Chelicerata
- Class: Arachnida
- Order: Araneae
- Infraorder: Araneomorphae
- Family: Theridiidae
- Genus: Rhomphaea
- Species: R. urquharti

Binomial name
- Rhomphaea urquharti (Bryant, 1933)

Synonyms
- Ariamnes attenuatus

= Rhomphaea urquharti =

Species of spider

Rhomphaea urquharti is a species of cobweb spider that is endemic to New Zealand.

== Taxonomy ==
This species was described as Ariamnes attenuatus in 1887 by Elizabeth Bryant from male and female specimens. It was most recently revised in 1933.

== Description ==
The male is recorded at 2.8mm in length whereas the female is 5mm. The cephalothorax is brown. The abdomen is brown and mottled silver.

== Distribution ==
This species is only known from New Zealand.

== Conservation status ==
Under the New Zealand Threat Classification System, this species is listed as "Data Deficient" with the qualifiers of "Data Poor: Size", "Data Poor: Trend" and "One Location".
