= Ariamnes triangulatus =

Conservation status
- Data Deficient (NZ TCS)

Scientific classification
- Domain: Eukaryota
- Kingdom: Animalia
- Phylum: Arthropoda
- Subphylum: Chelicerata
- Class: Arachnida
- Order: Araneae
- Infraorder: Araneomorphae
- Family: Theridiidae
- Genus: Ariamnes
- Species: A. triangulatus

Binomial name
- Ariamnes triangulatus Urquhart, 1887

Synonyms
- Rhomphaea triangularis

Species of spider

Ariamnes triangulatus is a species of tangle web spider endemic to New Zealand.

== Taxonomy ==
This species was described in 1887 by Arthur Urquhart from male and female specimens.

== Distribution ==
This species is only known from Te Karaka, New Zealand.

== Conservation status ==
Under the New Zealand Threat Classification System, this species is listed as "Data Deficient" with the qualifiers of "Data Poor: Size", "Data Poor: Trend" and "One Location".
