= Ariamnes makue =

Scientific classification
- Kingdom: Animalia
- Phylum: Arthropoda
- Subphylum: Chelicerata
- Class: Arachnida
- Order: Araneae
- Infraorder: Araneomorphae
- Family: Theridiidae
- Genus: Ariamnes
- Species: A. makue

Binomial name
- Ariamnes makue R.G. Gillespie & M.A.J. Rivera, 2007

Species of spider

Ariamnes makue is a species of spider in the family Theridiidae. Ariamnes makue is only found in Hawaii. The name derives from the Hawaiian word "māku'e", meaning "dark in color".

== Description ==
Ariamnes makue has a long body form, typically a dark brown or black color. The females can grow to be bigger than the males, with males measuring from 5.3-5.7 millimeters (0.21 to 0.22 in) and females measuring from 5.8-6.3 millimeters (0.23 to 0.25 in). Ariamnes makue can be both free-living (non-parasitic) and kleptoparasitic.

== Distribution and habitat ==
They are endemic to the island of Oahu in the Hawaiian Islands. They have been photographed in Kaala, Oahu. They live in mesic environments, specifically near dead ferns.

== Taxonomy ==
The Ariamnes makue spider is in the genus Ariamnes, part of the family Theridiidae. It is indicated that Ariamnes makue split from Ariamnes uwepa, diversifying their descendants. H. Vanuytven, R. Jocqué, & C. Deeleman-Reinhold suggest Ariamnes makue should be placed in a different genus.
