= Ariamnes mexicanus =

Scientific classification
- Domain: Eukaryota
- Kingdom: Animalia
- Phylum: Arthropoda
- Subphylum: Chelicerata
- Class: Arachnida
- Order: Araneae
- Infraorder: Araneomorphae
- Family: Theridiidae
- Genus: Ariamnes
- Species: A. mexicanus

Binomial name
- Ariamnes mexicanus (Exline & Levi, 1962)

Synonyms
- Steatoda mexicana Levi, 1957

Species of spider

Ariamnes mexicanus is a species of comb-footed spider found in Mexico and Cuba. Like many other spiders in the genus Ariamnes, it has a greatly elongated abdomen.
