= Ariamnes waikula =

Scientific classification
- Domain: Eukaryota
- Kingdom: Animalia
- Phylum: Arthropoda
- Subphylum: Chelicerata
- Class: Arachnida
- Order: Araneae
- Infraorder: Araneomorphae
- Family: Theridiidae
- Genus: Ariamnes
- Species: A. waikula

Binomial name
- Ariamnes waikula Gillespie & Rivera, 2007

Species of spider

Ariamnes waikula is a species of spider from the family Theridiidae. The species is known only from the island of Hawaii, in the state of Hawaii. The type specimen was collected from wet forest habitat at 1,067 meters (3,501 ft) elevation. The species is named for its gold-colored abdomen using the Hawaiian word for gold-colored, "waikula." A scientific description of this species was first published in 2007 by Gillespie & Rivera.
