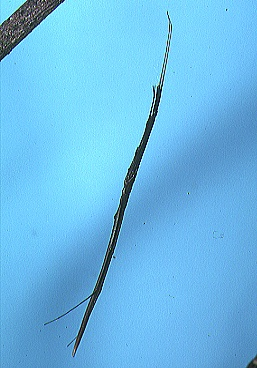
- male A. cylindrogaster from Japan

Scientific classification
- Kingdom: Animalia
- Phylum: Arthropoda
- Subphylum: Chelicerata
- Class: Arachnida
- Order: Araneae
- Infraorder: Araneomorphae
- Family: Theridiidae
- Genus: Ariamnes
- Species: A. cylindrogaster

Binomial name
- Ariamnes cylindrogaster Simon, 1889

Synonyms
- Argyrodes cylindrogaster

= Ariamnes cylindrogaster =

Species of spider

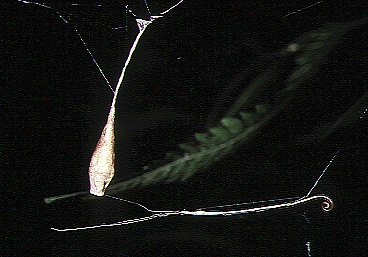
female A. cylindrogaster with egg sac

Ariamnes cylindrogaster is a spider belonging to the family Theridiidae. It is found from Laos to Japan.

== Description and habit ==
Like many species in its genus, A. cylindrogaster has an extremely elongated abdomen, resembling a twig or pine needle. Female body length is about 30 mm. Color ranges from green to brown. Males are slightly smaller (around 25 mm), but otherwise look similar. The abdomen can be bent upwards.

Ariamnes cylindrogaster hunts other spiders, using a simplistic web, which it constructs between trees. In Japan, almost 96% of its prey were found to be spiders in 24 species from 11 families.

The species creates an elongated egg sac.

== Distribution ==
Ariamnes cylindrogaster is found in Laos, China (including Hong Kong), Korea, Taiwan and Japan. It typically lives in forests.
