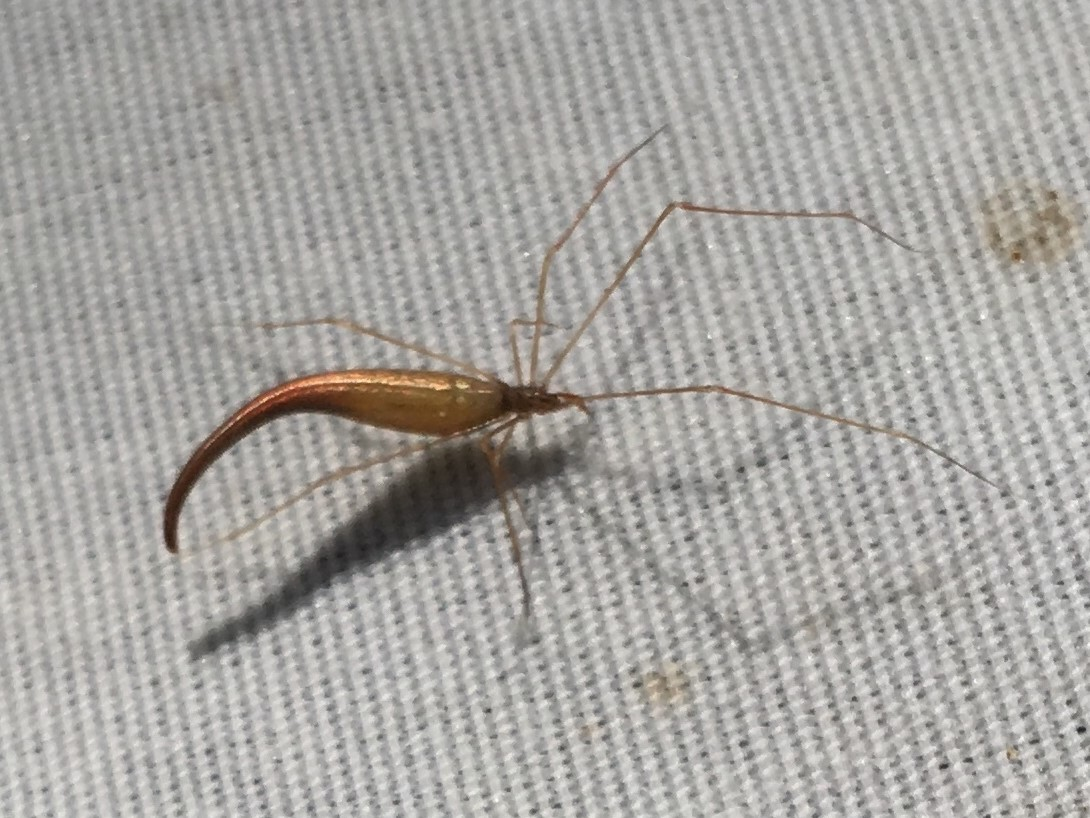

Scientific classification
- Domain: Eukaryota
- Kingdom: Animalia
- Phylum: Arthropoda
- Subphylum: Chelicerata
- Class: Arachnida
- Order: Araneae
- Infraorder: Araneomorphae
- Family: Theridiidae
- Genus: Rhomphaea
- Species: R. fictilium

Binomial name
- Rhomphaea fictilium (Hentz, 1850)

= Rhomphaea fictilium =

Species of spider

Rhomphaea fictilium is a species of cobweb spider in the family Theridiidae. It is found in a range from Canada to Argentina.
