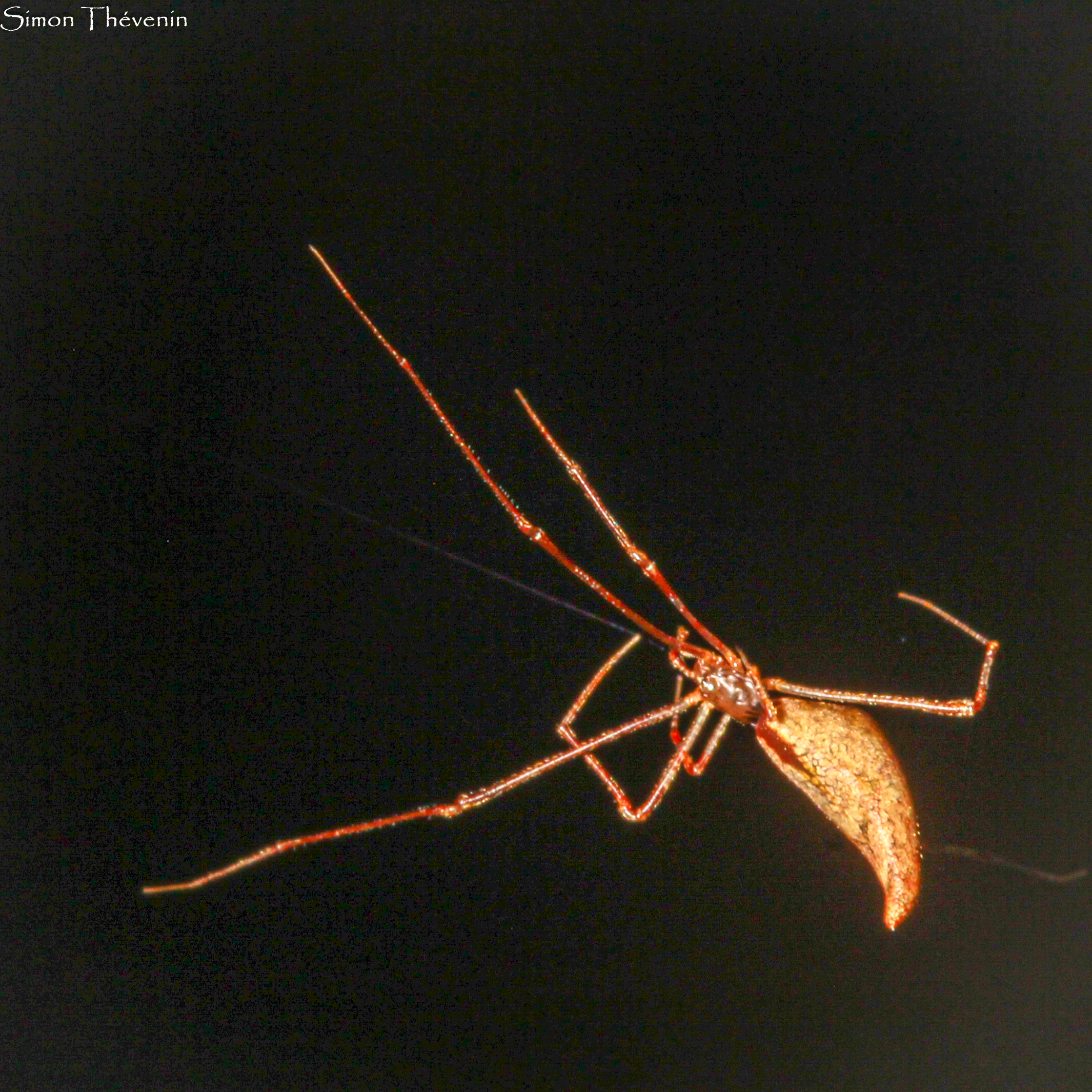
- female

Scientific classification
- Kingdom: Animalia
- Phylum: Arthropoda
- Subphylum: Chelicerata
- Class: Arachnida
- Order: Araneae
- Infraorder: Araneomorphae
- Family: Theridiidae
- Genus: Rhomphaea
- Species: R. nasica

Binomial name
- Rhomphaea nasica (Simon, 1873)

Synonyms
- Ariamnes nasica Simon, 1873; Ariamnes argenteolus Simon, 1873; Ariamnes nasicus Simon, 1881; Ariamnes argenteola Simon, 1881; Ariamnes delicatulus Simon, 1883; Rhomphaea argenteola Simon, 1914; Argyrodes nasica Benoit, 1977; Argyrodes delicatulus Wunderlich, 1987; Argyrodes nasicus Wunderlich, 1987; Argyrodes argenteolus Agnarsson, 2004

= Rhomphaea nasica =

Tailed Comb-foot Spider

Species of spider

Rhomphaea nasica is a species of spider in the family Theridiidae. It has a wide distribution across the Mediterranean region, Africa, and St. Helena.

== Distribution ==
Rhomphaea nasica is found across the Canary Islands, Portugal, Spain, France, Italy, Croatia, Greece, Africa, and St. Helena.

In South Africa, the species has been recorded from five provinces. Notable locations include Fish River, Grahamstown, Ezemvelo Nature Reserve, Kloof, Lhuvhondo Nature Reserve, Venetia Limpopo Valley Reserve, Kruger National Park, Blouberg Nature Reserve, and Uitzicht Annex.

== Habitat and ecology ==
Rhomphaea nasica has been sampled from the Grassland, Savanna, and Thicket biomes at altitudes ranging from 71 to 1,411 m.

== Description ==
Adults of Rhomphaea nasica are slender, long-legged spiders with an elongated abdomen typical of the genus. The body shows a silvery or translucent appearance, which provides camouflage against vegetation. Females are larger than males, as is common in Theridiidae. The species resembles others in the Rhomphaea genus, especially R. argenteola and R. delicatula, with which it was historically confused before synonymization.

== Conservation ==
Rhomphaea nasica is listed as Least Concern due to its wide geographical range. The species is protected in five protected areas in South Africa.

== Taxonomy ==
Rhomphaea nasica was described by Simon in 1873 as Ariamnes nasica. The species was transferred from Argyrodes to Rhomphaea by Agnarsson in 2004. Several species have been synonymized with R. nasica, including Argyrodes argenteolus and A. delicatulus.
