= Ariamnes attenuatus =

Scientific classification
- Domain: Eukaryota
- Kingdom: Animalia
- Phylum: Arthropoda
- Subphylum: Chelicerata
- Class: Arachnida
- Order: Araneae
- Infraorder: Araneomorphae
- Family: Theridiidae
- Genus: Ariamnes
- Species: A. attenuatus

Binomial name
- Ariamnes attenuatus O. Pickard-Cambridge, 1881

Species of spider

Ariamnes attenuatus is a species of comb-footed spider in the family Theridiidae. It is found from the Caribbean to Argentina.
