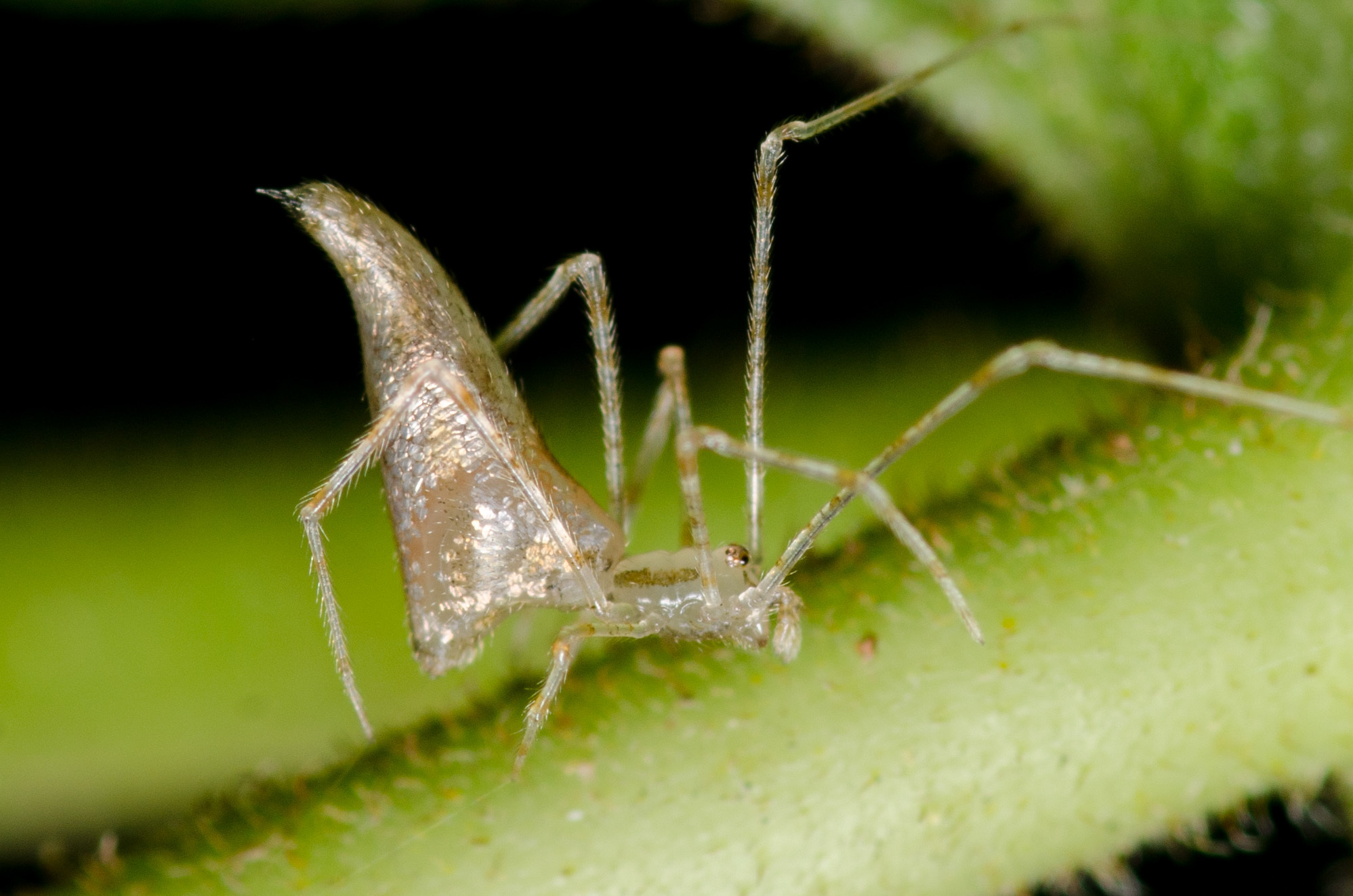

Scientific classification
- Domain: Eukaryota
- Kingdom: Animalia
- Phylum: Arthropoda
- Subphylum: Chelicerata
- Class: Arachnida
- Order: Araneae
- Infraorder: Araneomorphae
- Family: Theridiidae
- Genus: Rhomphaea
- Species: R. projiciens

Binomial name
- Rhomphaea projiciens O. P.-Cambridge, 1896

= Rhomphaea projiciens =

Species of spider

Rhomphaea projiciens is a species of cobweb spider in the family Theridiidae. It is found in a range from the United States to Argentina, and has been introduced into India.
