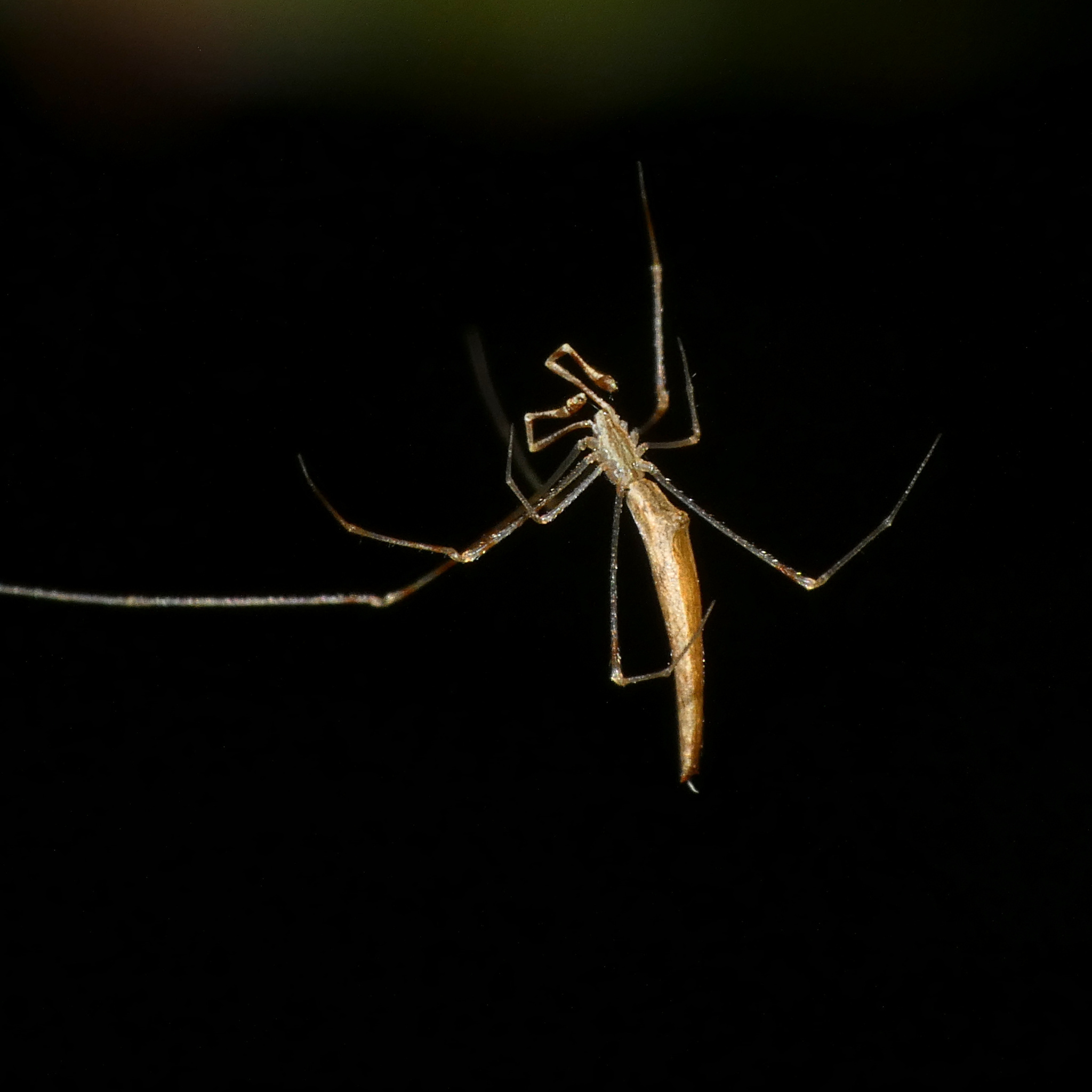

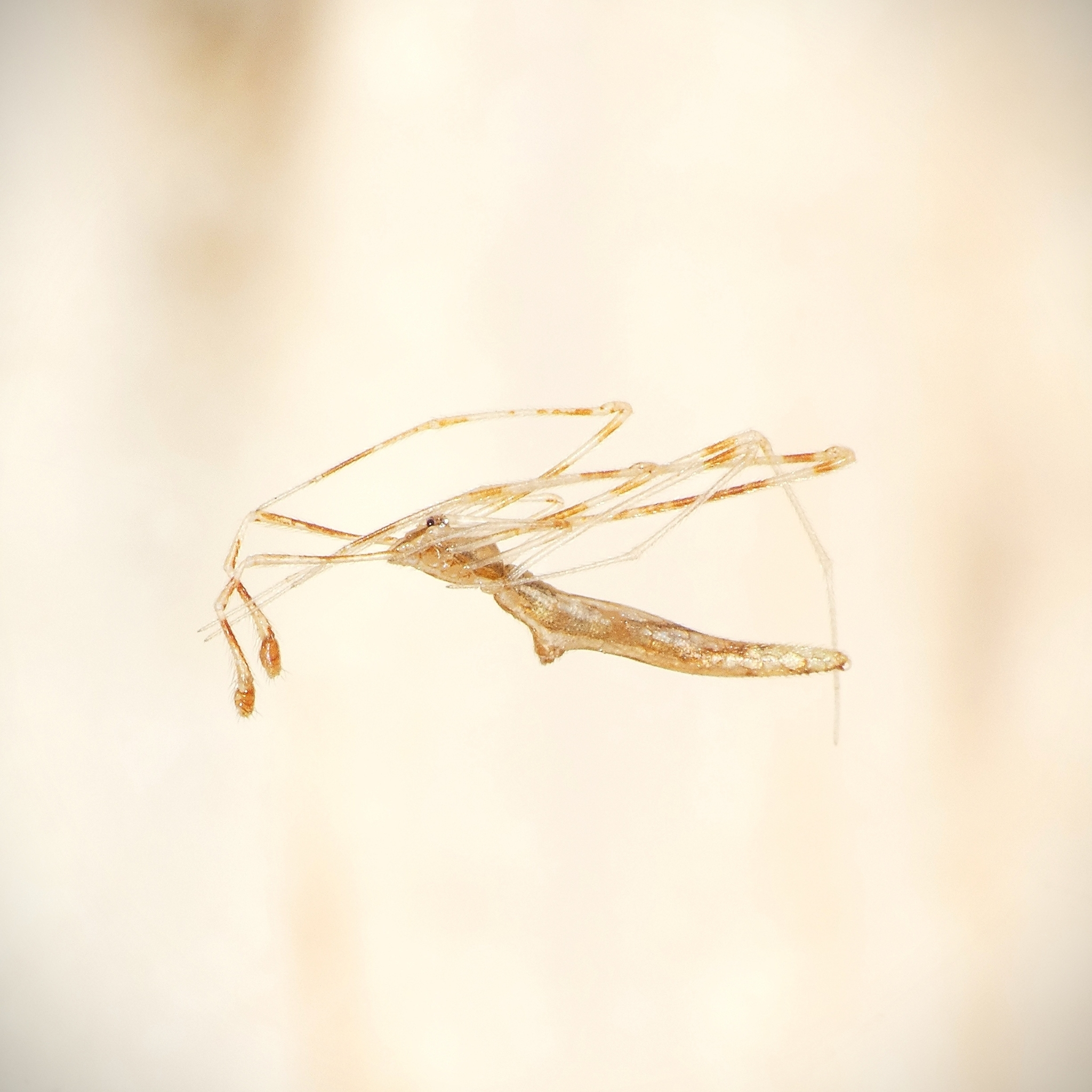

Scientific classification
- Kingdom: Animalia
- Phylum: Arthropoda
- Subphylum: Chelicerata
- Class: Arachnida
- Order: Araneae
- Infraorder: Araneomorphae
- Family: Theridiidae
- Genus: Rhomphaea
- Species: R. affinis

Binomial name
- Rhomphaea affinis Lessert, 1936

= Rhomphaea affinis =

Mozambique's Tailed Comb-foot Spider

Species of spider

Rhomphaea affinis is a species of spider in the family Theridiidae. It is a southern African endemic commonly known as Mozambique's tailed comb-foot spider.

== Distribution ==
Rhomphaea affinis is known from Mozambique and South Africa.

In South Africa, the species has been sampled from two Free State Province and KwaZulu-Natal. Locations include Sandveld Nature Reserve, Ndumo Game Reserve, Pietermaritzburg, Ithala Nature Reserve, Vernon Crookes Nature Reserve, and Kosi Bay Coastal Forest.

== Habitat and ecology ==
Rhomphaea affinis has been sampled from the Savanna biome at altitudes ranging from 47 to 1,325 m.

== Description ==
Only the female is known. Females measure 4 to 5 mm in length. The species has an elongate, flattened, brownish carapace with pale yellow to brown legs. The abdomen is elongated and triangular with a tip above the spinnerets, mottled white with silver spots.

== Conservation ==
Rhomphaea affinis is listed as Least Concern due to its wide geographical range. The species is protected in Ndumo Game Reserve, Ithala Nature Reserve, Sandveld Nature Reserve, and Vernon Crookes Nature Reserve.

== Taxonomy ==
Rhomphaea affinis was described by Lessert in 1936 from Mozambique. The species was transferred from Argyrodes to Rhomphaea by Agnarsson in 2004. The species has not been revised and is known only from the female.
