= Ariamnes uwepa =

Scientific classification
- Domain: Eukaryota
- Kingdom: Animalia
- Phylum: Arthropoda
- Subphylum: Chelicerata
- Class: Arachnida
- Order: Araneae
- Infraorder: Araneomorphae
- Family: Theridiidae
- Genus: Ariamnes
- Species: A. uwepa

Binomial name
- Ariamnes uwepa R.G. Gillespie & M.A.J. Rivera, 2007

Species of spider

Ariamnes uwepa is a species of spider from the family Theridiidae. It is only known to be found on Oahu, in the Hawaiian Islands. The name derives from the Hawaiian word "uwepa," meaning whip.

== Description ==
Ariamnes uwepa length varies from 6.3 to 7.2 millimetres (0.25 to 0.28 in) in males and from 10.0 to 10.5 millimetres (0.39 to 0.41 in) in females. Living specimens have a bright gold abdomen, sometimes with red.

== Range and habitat ==
Very little is known about the range. Specimens have been collected from mesic habitat, often found under leaves. Species has been exclusively found on Oahu.
