= Ariamnes pavesii =

Scientific classification
- Kingdom: Animalia
- Phylum: Arthropoda
- Subphylum: Chelicerata
- Class: Arachnida
- Order: Araneae
- Infraorder: Araneomorphae
- Family: Theridiidae
- Genus: Ariamnes
- Species: A. pavesii

Binomial name
- Ariamnes pavesii Leardi, 1902

Species of spider

Ariamnes pavesii is a species of spider of the genus Ariamnes. It is native to India and Sri Lanka.
