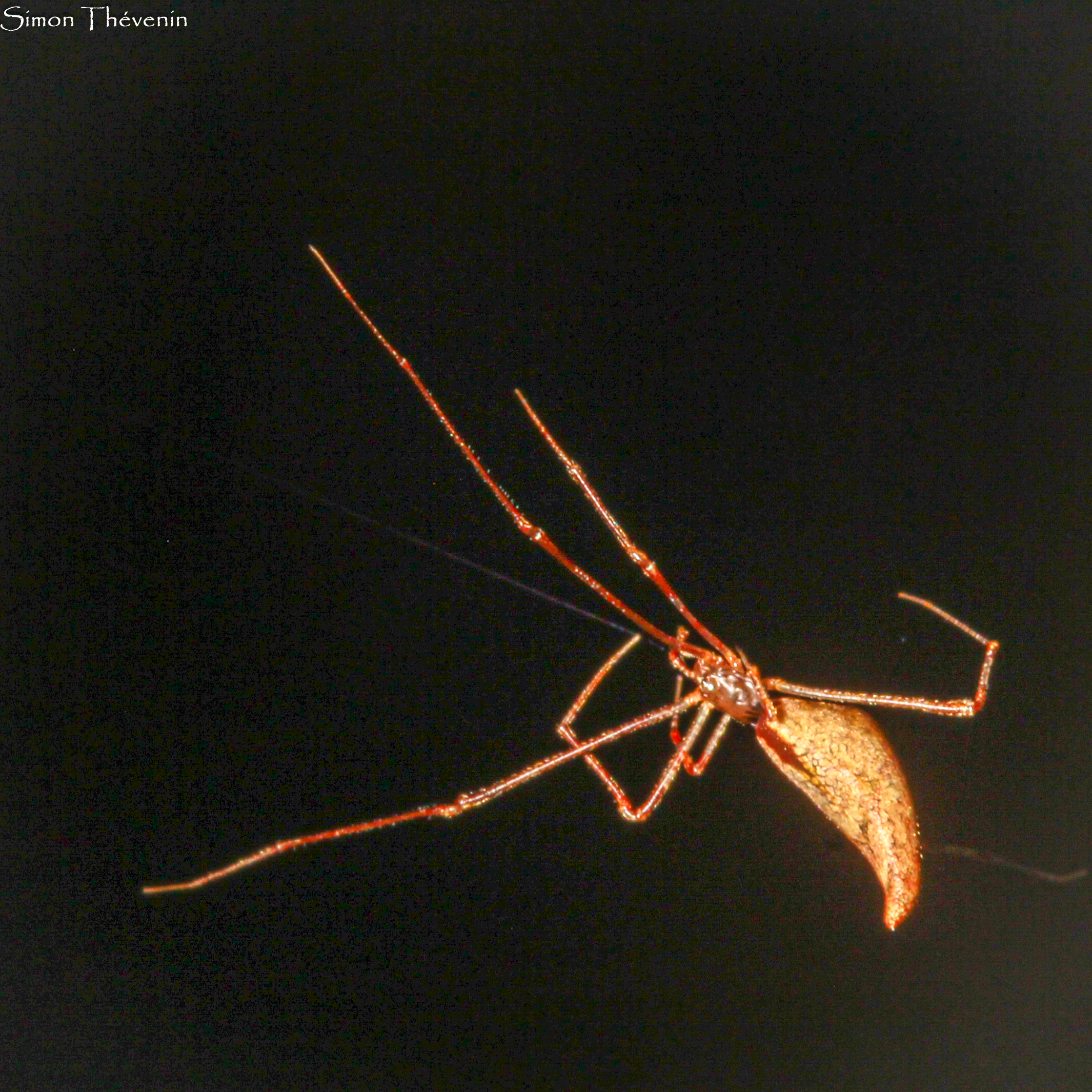
- female R. nasica
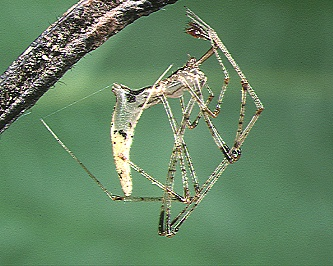
- male R. tanikawai

Scientific classification
- Kingdom: Animalia
- Phylum: Arthropoda
- Subphylum: Chelicerata
- Class: Arachnida
- Order: Araneae
- Infraorder: Araneomorphae
- Family: Theridiidae
- Genus: Rhomphaea; L. Koch, 1872

Type species
- R. cometes L. Koch, 1872

Species
- 39, see text

= Rhomphaea =

Genus of spiders

Rhomphaea is a genus of comb-footed spiders that was first described by Ludwig Carl Christian Koch in 1872.

== Distribution ==
Spiders in this genus are found worldwide.

== Life style ==
Rhomphaea species are elusive solitary spiders. They capture other spiders that wander onto their webs and also venture onto other spiders' webs to capture the residents. These spiders employ aggressive mimicry to lure victims and throw a sticky triangular net over their prey.

== Description ==
Rhomphaea spiders measure 4 to 5 mm in total length, with general coloration mostly light brown with many lighter spots.

The carapace features a slanting clypeus that projects anteriorly in both sexes, with stridulatory ridges and a longitudinal dark band. The carapace usually has a projection of the eye region in males. The abdomen is elongated, triangular, or cylindrical. In females, the abdomen tapers to a single tip and is usually four to six times as long behind the spinnerets as in front of them.

The legs are thin and long, with the first patella and tibia measuring three to four times the carapace length.

== Taxonomy ==
The genus is very close to Ariamnes.

== Species ==
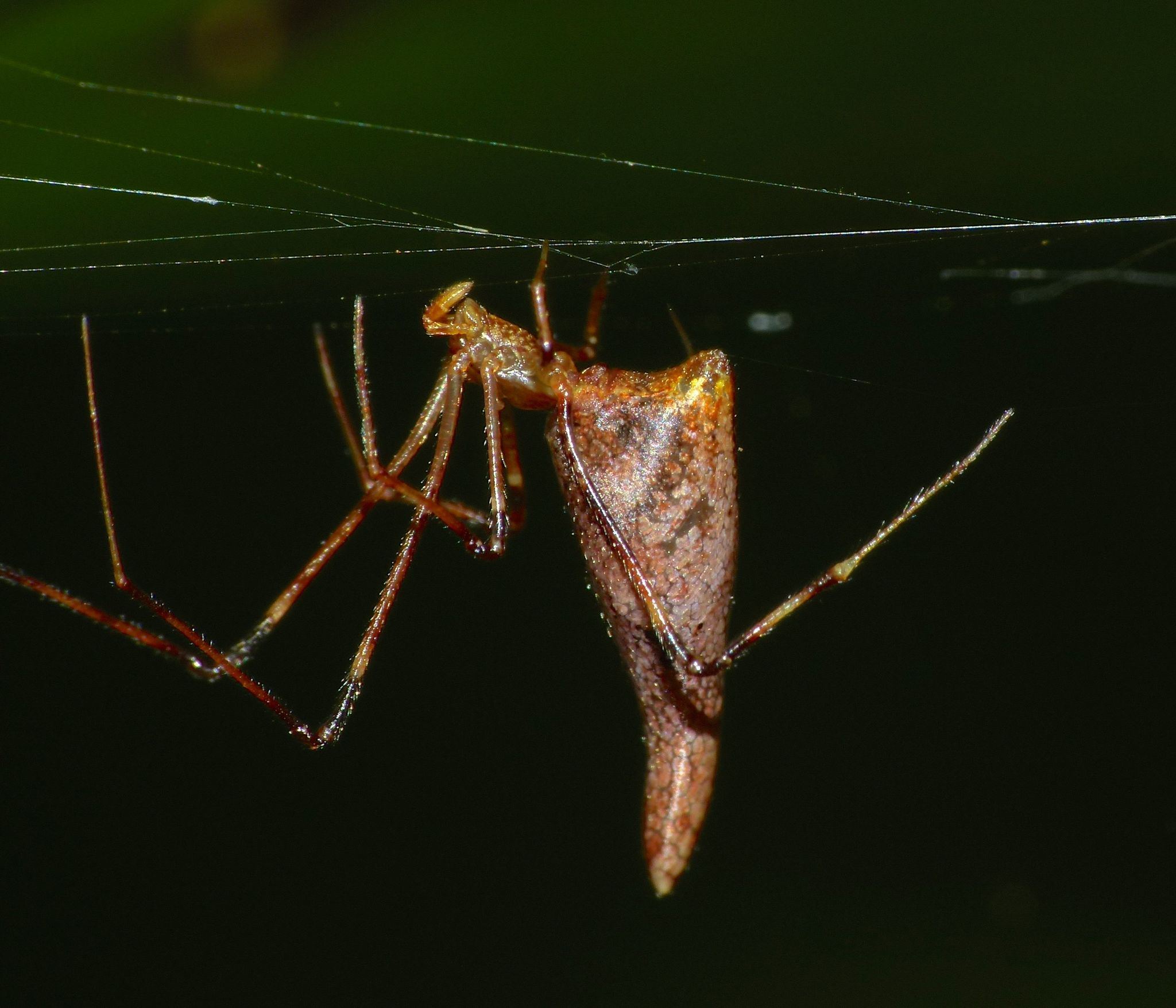
R. urquharti

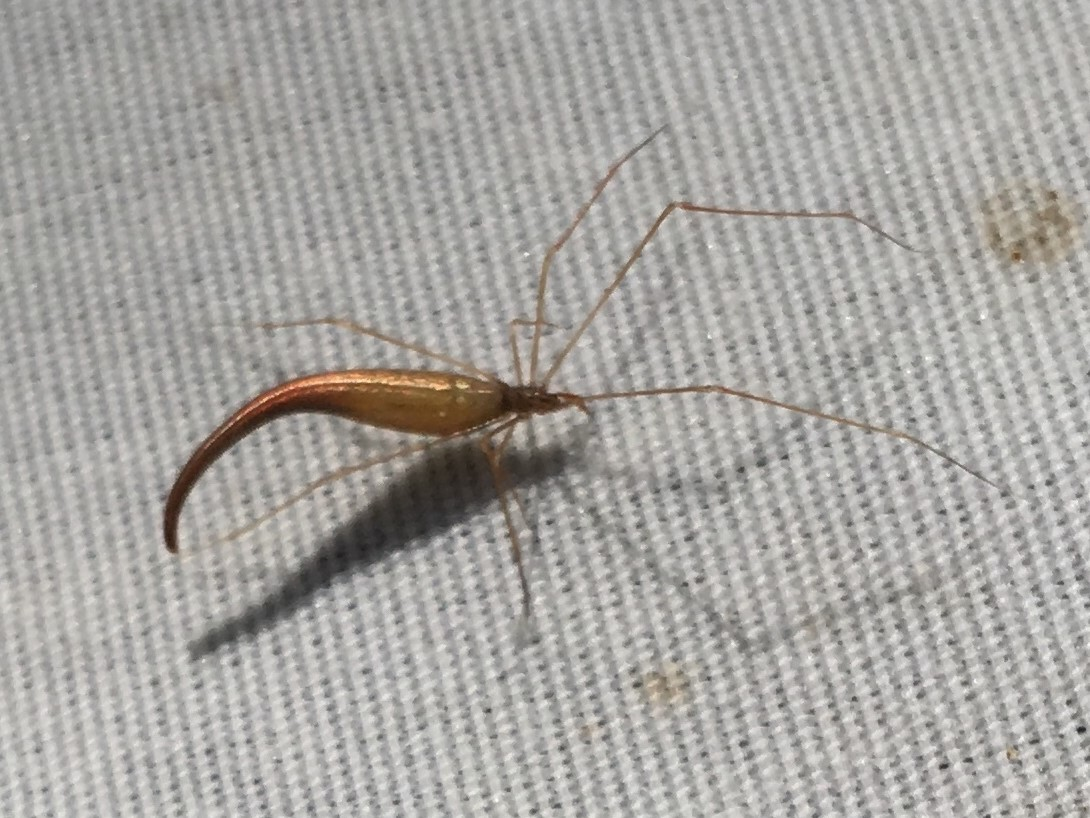
R. fictilium

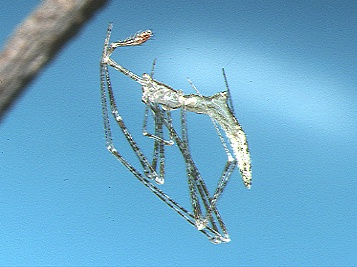
male R. labiata

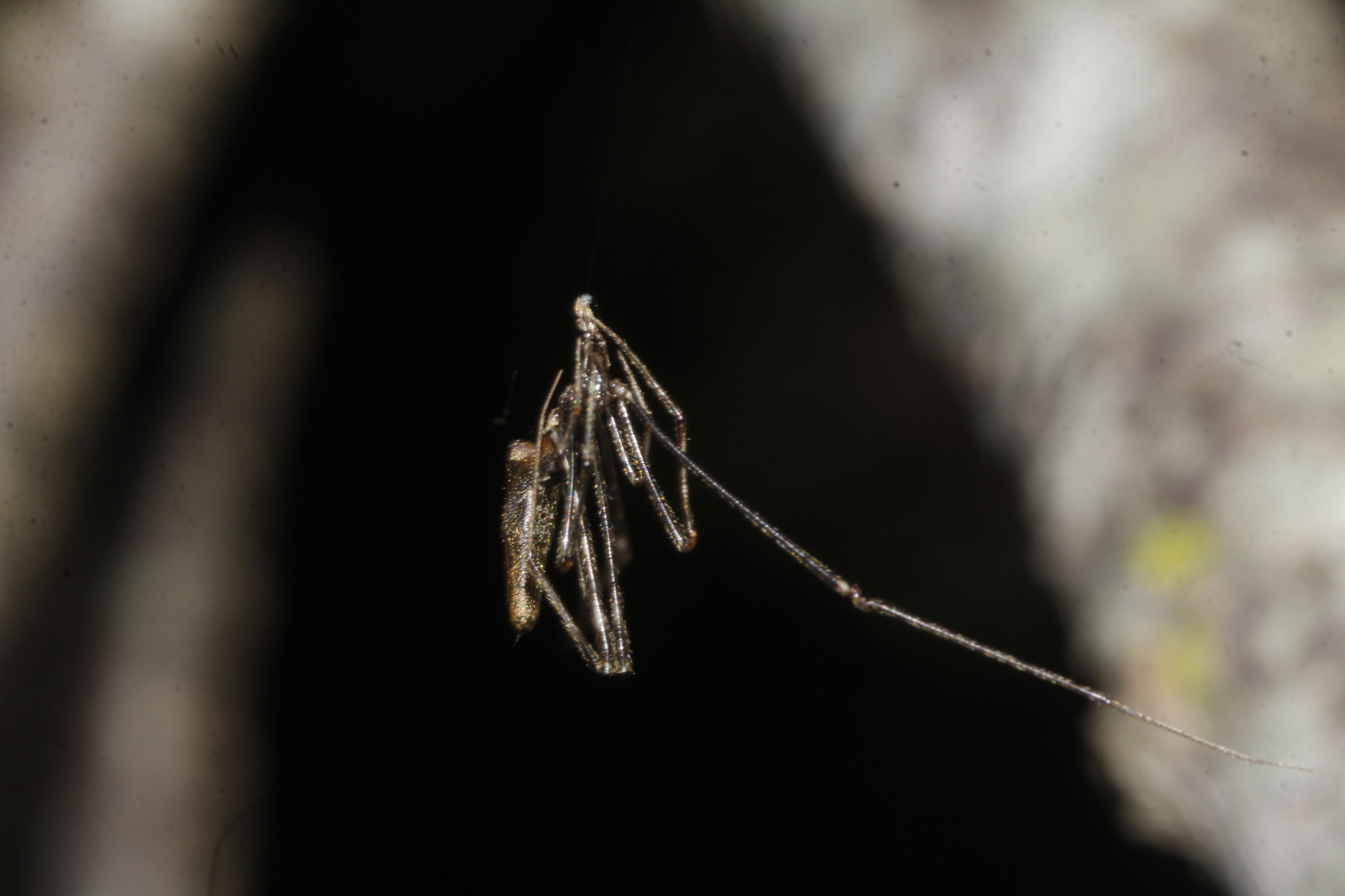
R. projiciens

As of October 2025, this genus includes 39 species:

- Rhomphaea aculeata Thorell, 1898 – Myanmar
- Rhomphaea affinis Lessert, 1936 – Mozambique, South Africa
- Rhomphaea altissima Mello-Leitão, 1941 – Brazil
- Rhomphaea angulipalpis Thorell, 1877 – Indonesia (Sulawesi)
- Rhomphaea annulipedis Yoshida & Nojima, 2010 – Japan
- Rhomphaea barycephalus (Roberts, 1983) – Seychelles (Aldabra)
- Rhomphaea birgitae (Strand, 1917) – Myanmar
- Rhomphaea brasiliensis Mello-Leitão, 1920 – Venezuela, Brazil
- Rhomphaea ceraosus (Zhu & Song, 1991) – China
- Rhomphaea cometes L. Koch, 1872 – Indonesia (New Guinea), Samoa, French Polynesia (type species)
- Rhomphaea cona (González & Carmen, 1996) – Argentina
- Rhomphaea fictilium (Hentz, 1850) – Canada to Argentina
- Rhomphaea hyrcana (Logunov & Marusik, 1990) – Georgia, Azerbaijan, China, Japan, Turkey?
- Rhomphaea irrorata Thorell, 1898 – Myanmar
- Rhomphaea jacko Tharmarajan & Benjamin, 2022 – Sri Lanka
- Rhomphaea labiata (Zhu & Song, 1991) – India, China, Korea, Japan, Laos
- Rhomphaea lactifera Simon, 1909 – Vietnam
- Rhomphaea longicaudata O. Pickard-Cambridge, 1872 – Greece, Lebanon
- Rhomphaea marani Tharmarajan & Benjamin, 2022 – Sri Lanka
- Rhomphaea martini Tharmarajan & Benjamin, 2022 – Sri Lanka
- Rhomphaea metaltissima Soares & Camargo, 1948 – Panama to Brazil
- Rhomphaea nasica (Simon, 1873) – Canary Islands, Portugal, Spain, France, Italy, Croatia, Greece, Africa, St. Helena
- Rhomphaea oris (González & Carmen, 1996) – Argentina
- Rhomphaea ornatissima Dyal, 1935 – Pakistan
- Rhomphaea palmarensis (González & Carmen, 1996) – Argentina
- Rhomphaea paradoxa (Taczanowski, 1873) – St. Vincent, Mexico to Brazil
- Rhomphaea pignalitoensis (González & Carmen, 1996) – Argentina
- Rhomphaea procera (O. Pickard-Cambridge, 1898) – Costa Rica to Argentina
- Rhomphaea projiciens O. Pickard-Cambridge, 1896 – USA to Argentina. Introduced to India
- Rhomphaea recurvata (Saaristo, 1978) – Seychelles
- Rhomphaea rostrata (Simon, 1873) – Canary Islands, Portugal, Spain, France, Italy, Slovenia, Croatia, Bosnia and Herzegovina, Greece
- Rhomphaea sagana (Dönitz & Strand, 1906) – Azerbaijan, Iran, Russia (Far East), China, Korea, Japan, Philippines
- Rhomphaea shanthi Tharmarajan & Benjamin, 2022 – Sri Lanka
- Rhomphaea sinica (Zhu & Song, 1991) – China
- Rhomphaea sjostedti Tullgren, 1910 – Tanzania
- Rhomphaea tanikawai Yoshida, 2001 – China, Japan
- Rhomphaea triangula (Thorell, 1887) – Myanmar
- Rhomphaea urquharti (Bryant, 1933) – New Zealand
- Rhomphaea velhaensis (González & Carmen, 1996) – Brazil

In synonymy:

- R. argenteola (Simon, 1873) = Rhomphaea nasica (Simon, 1873)
- R. canariensis (Schmidt, 1956) = Rhomphaea rostrata (Simon, 1873)
- R. delicatula (Simon, 1883) = Rhomphaea nasica (Simon, 1873)
- R. feioi (Mello-Leitão, 1947) = Rhomphaea projiciens O. Pickard-Cambridge, 1896
- R. honesta (Exline & Levi, 1962) = Rhomphaea brasiliensis Mello-Leitão, 1920
- R. longa (Kulczyński, 1905) = Rhomphaea rostrata (Simon, 1873)
- R. martinae (Exline, 1950) = Rhomphaea projiciens O. Pickard-Cambridge, 1896
- R. petrunkevitchi (Mello-Leitão, 1945) = Rhomphaea paradoxa (Taczanowski, 1873)
- R. remota (Bryant, 1940) = Rhomphaea fictilium (Hentz, 1850)
- R. simoni (Petrunkevitch, 1911) = Rhomphaea procera (O. Pickard-Cambridge, 1898)
- R. spinicaudata (Keyserling, 1884) = Rhomphaea paradoxa (Taczanowski, 1873)
- R. spinosa (Badcock, 1932) = Rhomphaea projiciens O. Pickard-Cambridge, 1896
