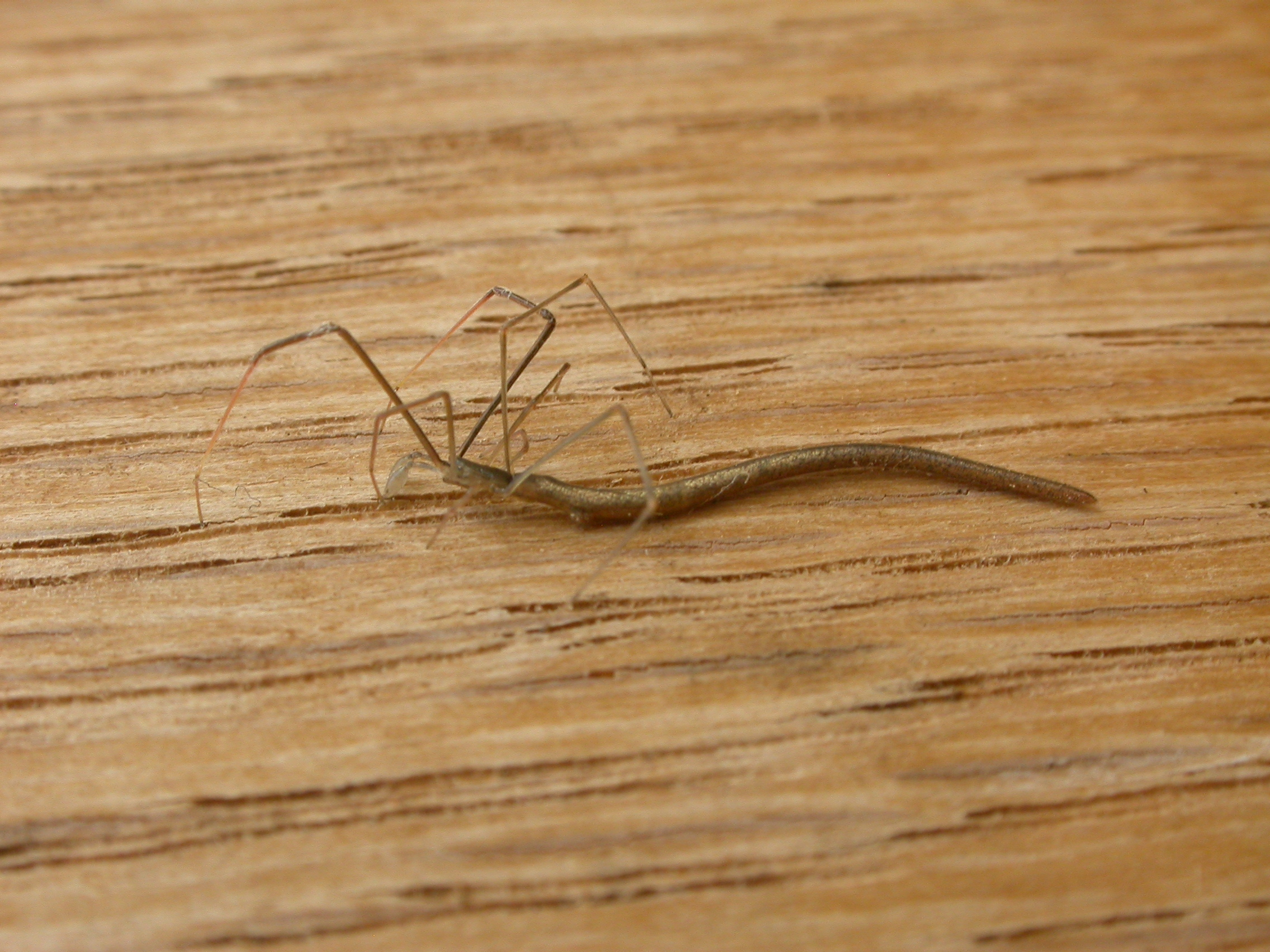
- Ariamnes sp. from Aranda, Australia
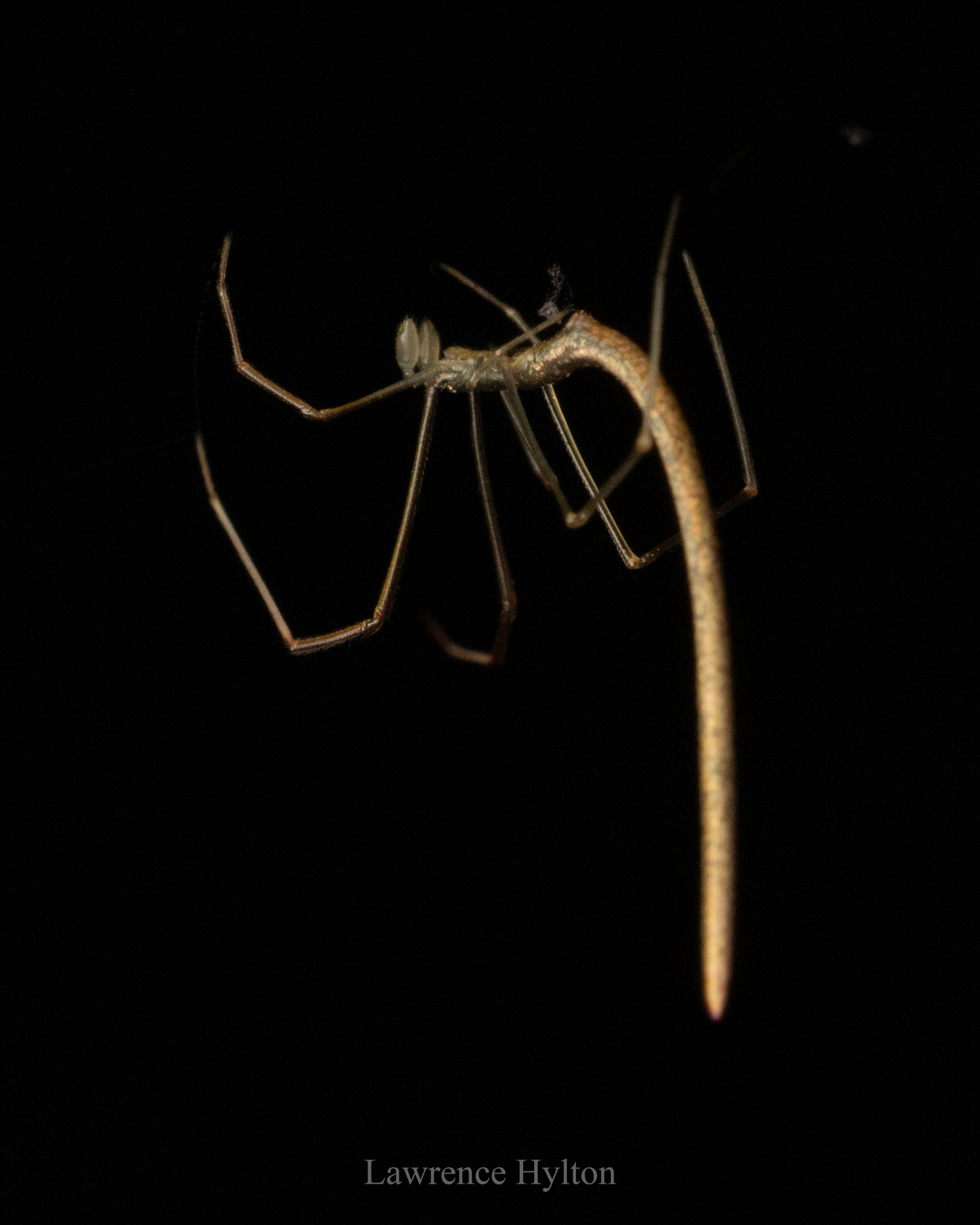
- A. colubrinus in Australia

Scientific classification
- Kingdom: Animalia
- Phylum: Arthropoda
- Subphylum: Chelicerata
- Class: Arachnida
- Order: Araneae
- Infraorder: Araneomorphae
- Family: Theridiidae
- Genus: Ariamnes; Thorell, 1869

Type species
- A. flagellum (Doleschall, 1857)

Species
- 30, see text

= Ariamnes (spider) =

Genus of spiders

Ariamnes is a genus of comb-footed spiders (family Theridiidae) that was first described by Tamerlan Thorell in 1869. Some species have greatly elongated abdomens, making them resemble a twig.

== Life style ==
These spiders are mostly free-living, at least as adults, although a number have been found to occur as kleptoparasites on the webs of other spiders, at least facultatively. They are nocturnal. The egg sac is elongated. They are rare and little is known about them in South Africa.

== Taxonomy ==
Ariamnes was removed from the synonymy of Argyrodes by Agnarsson in 2004.

== Species ==
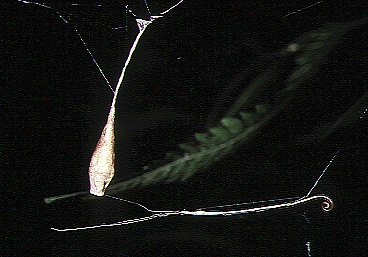
A. cylindrogaster with eggsac from Okinawa, Japan

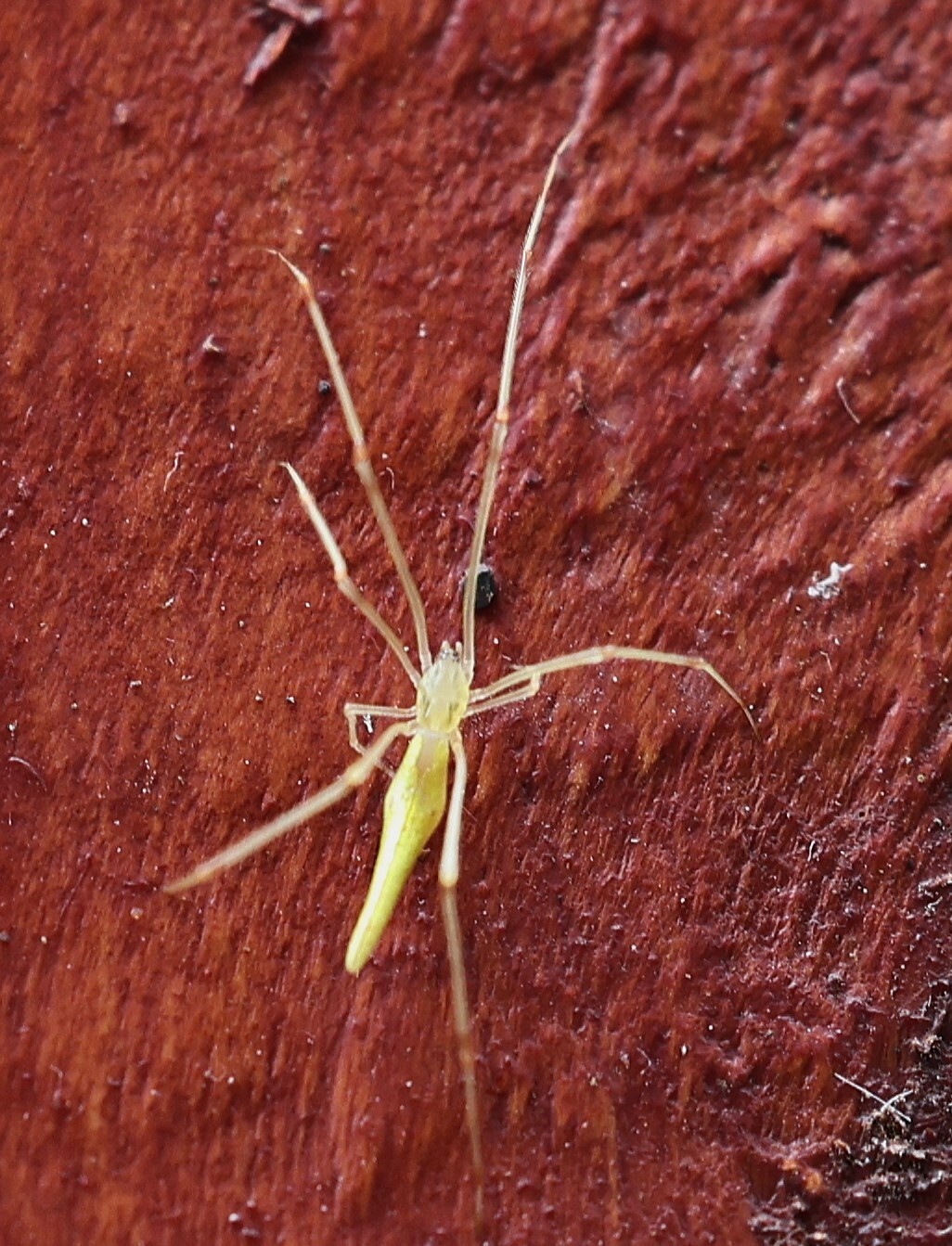
A. waikula

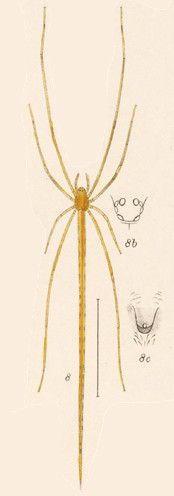
Ariamnes sp.

As of October 2025, this genus includes thirty species and one subspecies, found in Asia, Africa, South America, Oceania, the Caribbean, Costa Rica, and Mexico

- Ariamnes alepeleke Gillespie & Rivera, 2007 – Hawaii
- Ariamnes attenuatus O. Pickard-Cambridge, 1881 – Costa Rica, Panama, Caribbean, South America
- Ariamnes campestratus Simon, 1903 – Gabon, DR Congo, South Africa
- Ariamnes columnaceus Gao & Li, 2014 – China
- Ariamnes corniger Simon, 1900 – Hawaii
- Ariamnes cylindrogaster Simon, 1889 – Japan, Korea, China, Taiwan, Laos, Indonesia (Sulawesi), Australia
- Ariamnes flagellum (Doleschall, 1857) – Southeast Asia, Australia (type species)
  - A. f. nigritus Simon, 1901 – Southeast Asia
- Ariamnes haitensis (Exline & Levi, 1962) – Hispaniola
- Ariamnes helminthoides Simon, 1907 – Guinea-Bissau
- Ariamnes hiwa Gillespie & Rivera, 2007 – Hawaii
- Ariamnes huinakolu Gillespie & Rivera, 2007 – Hawaii
- Ariamnes jeanneli Berland, 1920 – East Africa
- Ariamnes kahili Gillespie & Rivera, 2007 – Hawaii
- Ariamnes laau Gillespie & Rivera, 2007 – Hawaii
- Ariamnes longissimus Keyserling, 1891 – Peru, Brazil
- Ariamnes makue Gillespie & Rivera, 2007 – Hawaii
- Ariamnes melekalikimaka Gillespie & Rivera, 2007 – Hawaii
- Ariamnes mexicanus (Exline & Levi, 1962) – Mexico, Cuba
- Ariamnes papua Vanuytven, Jocqué & Deeleman-Reinhold, 2025 – Papua New Guinea
- Ariamnes patersoniensis Hickman, 1927 – Australia (Tasmania)
- Ariamnes pavesii Leardi, 1902 – India, Sri Lanka
- Ariamnes petilus Gao & Li, 2014 – China, Malaysia (Borneo)
- Ariamnes poele Gillespie & Rivera, 2007 – Hawaii
- Ariamnes russulus Simon, 1903 – Equatorial Guinea
- Ariamnes schlingeri (Exline & Levi, 1962) – Peru
- Ariamnes setipes van Hasselt, 1882 – Indonesia (Sumatra)
- Ariamnes simulans O. Pickard-Cambridge, 1892 – India
- Ariamnes triangulatus Urquhart, 1887 – New Zealand
- Ariamnes uwepa Gillespie & Rivera, 2007 – Hawaii
- Ariamnes waikula Gillespie & Rivera, 2007 – Hawaii

In synonymy:

- A. approximatus O. Pickard-Cambridge, 1894 = Ariamnes attenuatus O. Pickard-Cambridge, 1881
- A. gracillimus O. Pickard-Cambridge, 1894 = Ariamnes attenuatus O. Pickard-Cambridge, 1881
- A. pulcher Soares & Camargo, 1948 = Ariamnes attenuatus O. Pickard-Cambridge, 1881
- A. sinuatus Schenkel, 1953 = Ariamnes attenuatus O. Pickard-Cambridge, 1881
