= Enoplognatha inornata =

Clanwilliam Comb-Foot Spider

Scientific classification
- Kingdom: Animalia
- Phylum: Arthropoda
- Subphylum: Chelicerata
- Class: Arachnida
- Order: Araneae
- Infraorder: Araneomorphae
- Family: Theridiidae
- Genus: Enoplognatha
- Species: E. inornata

Binomial name
- Enoplognatha inornata O. Pickard-Cambridge, 1904

Species of spider

Enoplognatha inornata is a species of spider in the family Theridiidae. It is endemic to South Africa and is commonly known as the Clanwilliam comb-foot spider.

== Distribution ==
Enoplognatha inornata is only found in South Africa, where it is known from the provinces Eastern Cape, Gauteng, Limpopo, Northern Cape, and Western Cape. Locations include Cala, Kempton Park, Irene, Nylsvley Nature Reserve, Benfontein Game Reserve, Ceres, Clanwilliam, Cape Flats, and Table Mountain National Park.

== Habitat and ecology ==
This species makes cob-webs under stones or ground debris. The white egg sacs are deposited in the web. It was sampled from the Fynbos, Grassland, and Savanna biomes.

The species has been sampled at altitudes ranging from 9 to 1649 m.

== Conservation ==
Enoplognatha inornata is listed as Least Concern by the South African National Biodiversity Institute. Although the species is presently known only from one sex, it has a wide geographical range. There are no significant threats to this species. It is protected in Nylsvley Nature Reserve, Benfontein Game Reserve, and Table Mountain National Park.

== Taxonomy ==
Enoplognatha inornata was described by Octavius Pickard-Cambridge in 1904 from Clanwilliam in the Western Cape. The species is known only from the female.
