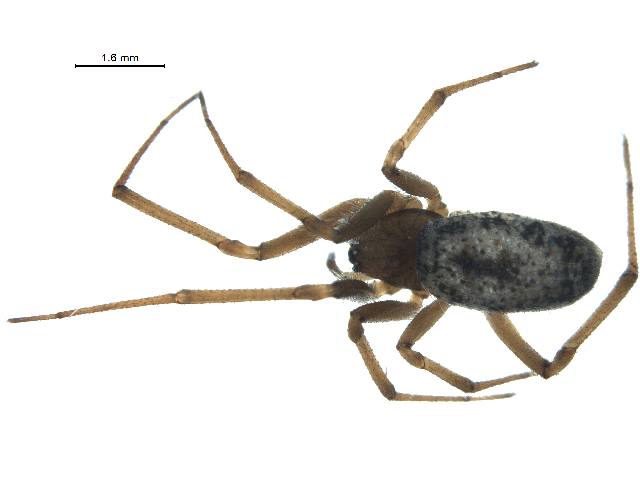
- E. joshua, adult female

Scientific classification
- Kingdom: Animalia
- Phylum: Arthropoda
- Subphylum: Chelicerata
- Class: Arachnida
- Order: Araneae
- Infraorder: Araneomorphae
- Family: Theridiidae
- Genus: Enoplognatha
- Species: E. joshua

Binomial name
- Enoplognatha joshua Chamberlin & Ivie, 1942

= Enoplognatha joshua =

Species of spider

Enoplognatha joshua is a species of cobweb spider in the family Theridiidae. It is found in the United States.
