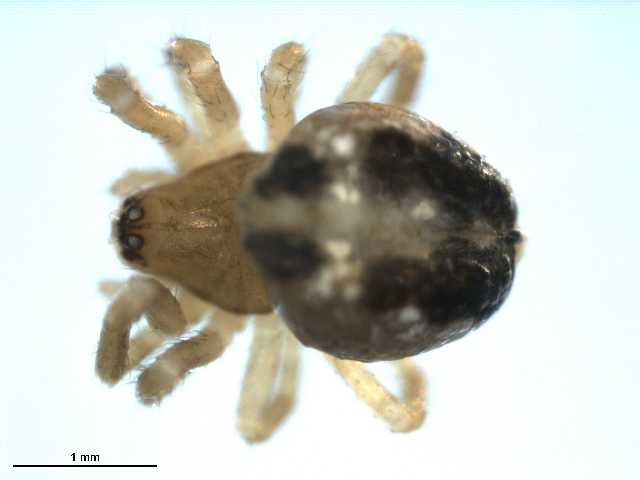
- E. caricis

Scientific classification
- Domain: Eukaryota
- Kingdom: Animalia
- Phylum: Arthropoda
- Subphylum: Chelicerata
- Class: Arachnida
- Order: Araneae
- Infraorder: Araneomorphae
- Family: Theridiidae
- Genus: Enoplognatha
- Species: E. caricis

Binomial name
- Enoplognatha caricis (Fickert, 1876)

= Enoplognatha caricis =

Species of spider

Enoplognatha caricis is a species of cobweb spider in the family Theridiidae. It is found in Europe, Turkey, a range within Russia (European to the Far East), China, Korea, and Japan.
