= Enoplognatha oreophila =

Scientific classification
- Kingdom: Animalia
- Phylum: Arthropoda
- Subphylum: Chelicerata
- Class: Arachnida
- Order: Araneae
- Infraorder: Araneomorphae
- Family: Theridiidae
- Genus: Enoplognatha
- Species: E. oreophila

Binomial name
- Enoplognatha oreophila (Simon, 1894)

Synonyms
- Symopagia oreophila Simon, 1894

Species of spider

Enoplognatha oreophila, is a species of spider of the genus Enoplognatha. It is endemic to Sri Lanka.
