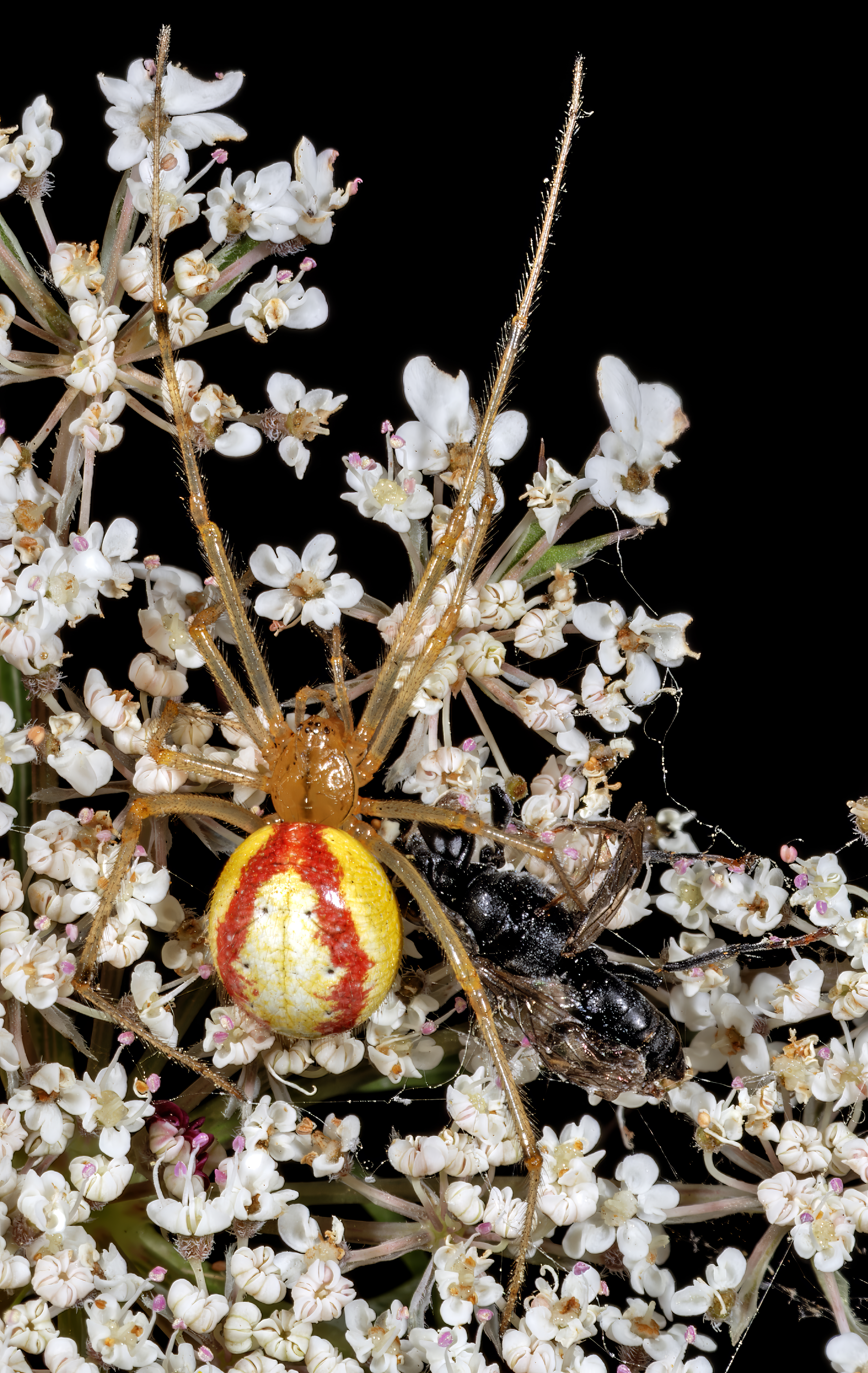
- female E. ovata
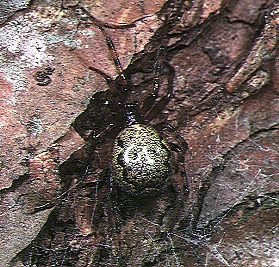
- female E. abrupta

Scientific classification
- Kingdom: Animalia
- Phylum: Arthropoda
- Subphylum: Chelicerata
- Class: Arachnida
- Order: Araneae
- Infraorder: Araneomorphae
- Family: Theridiidae
- Genus: Enoplognatha; Pavesi, 1880

Type species
- E. mandibularis (Lucas, 1846)

Species
- 75, see text

Synonyms
- Phyllonethis Thorell, 1869; Symopagia Simon, 1894

= Enoplognatha =

Genus of spiders

Enoplognatha is a genus of comb-footed spiders first described by P. Pavesi in 1880. They were characterized by both a large colulus and a subspherical abdomen, with males usually have enlarged chelicerae. It is considered a senior synonym of Symopagia.

== Life style ==
These spiders have a diverse lifestyle and make cob-webs under stones or ground debris while some specimens are sampled from vegetation where they build webs on, between and around leaves. The white egg sacs are deposited in the web.

In South Africa, Theridion purcelli and Enoplognatha molesta were the most abundant theridiids found in citrus orchards in South Africa. In cotton fields, E. molesta was the most common species, followed by T. purcelli. In the laboratory, both species fed on red spider mites, the first three larval stages and adult stages of Helicoverpa armigera, leafhoppers and aphids.

== Description ==
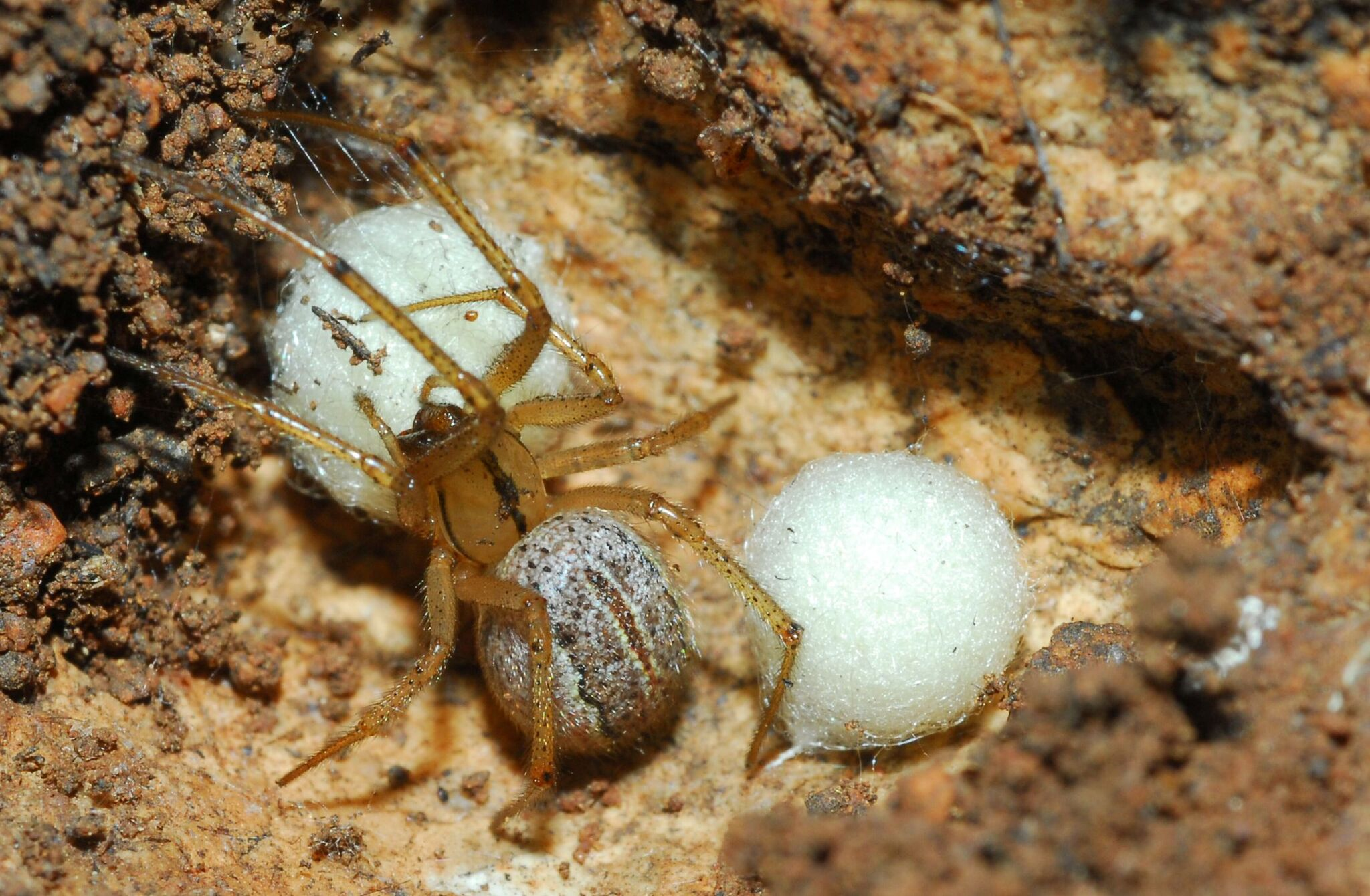
female E. molesta with egg sacs

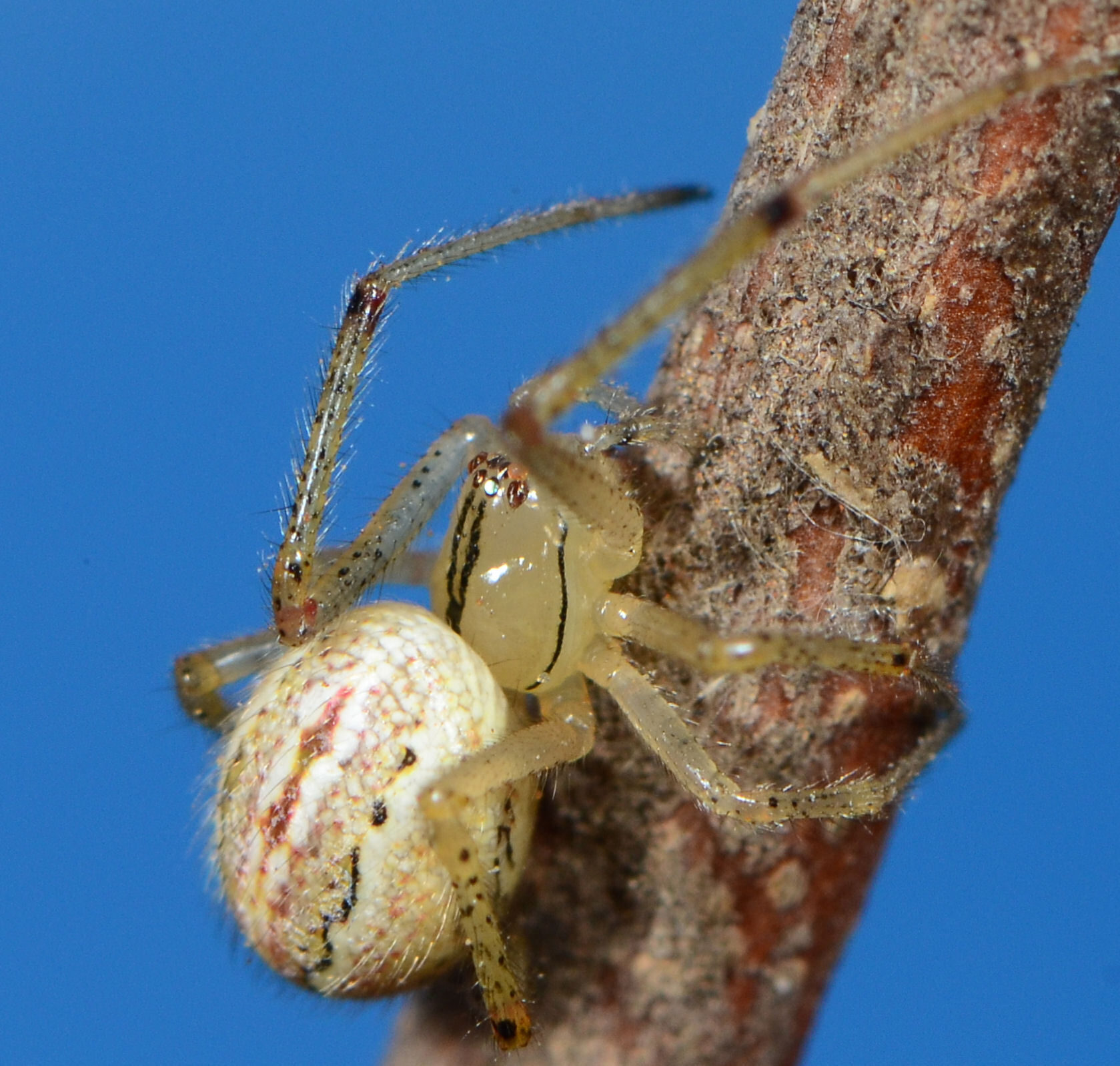
female E. molesta

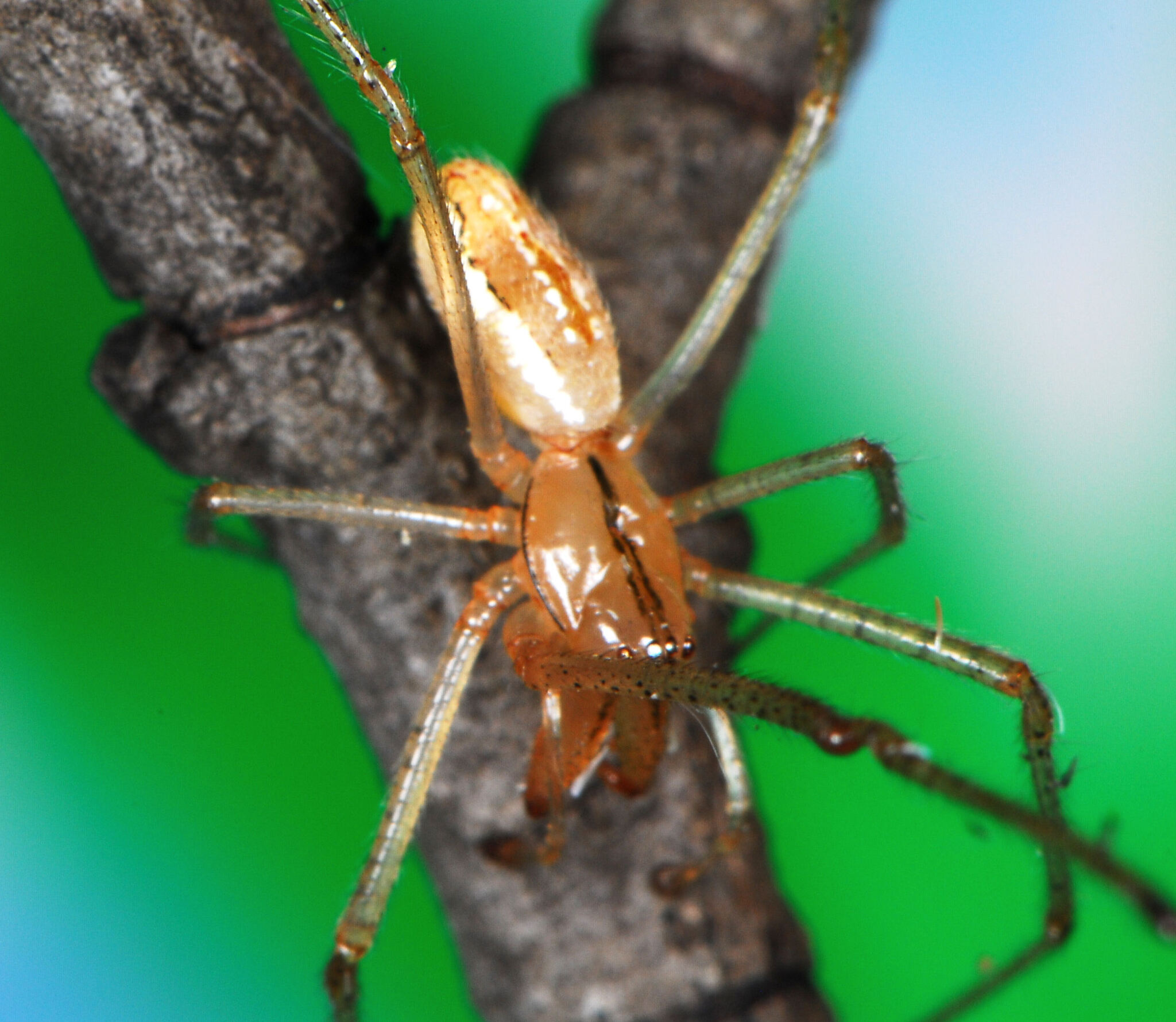
male E. molesta

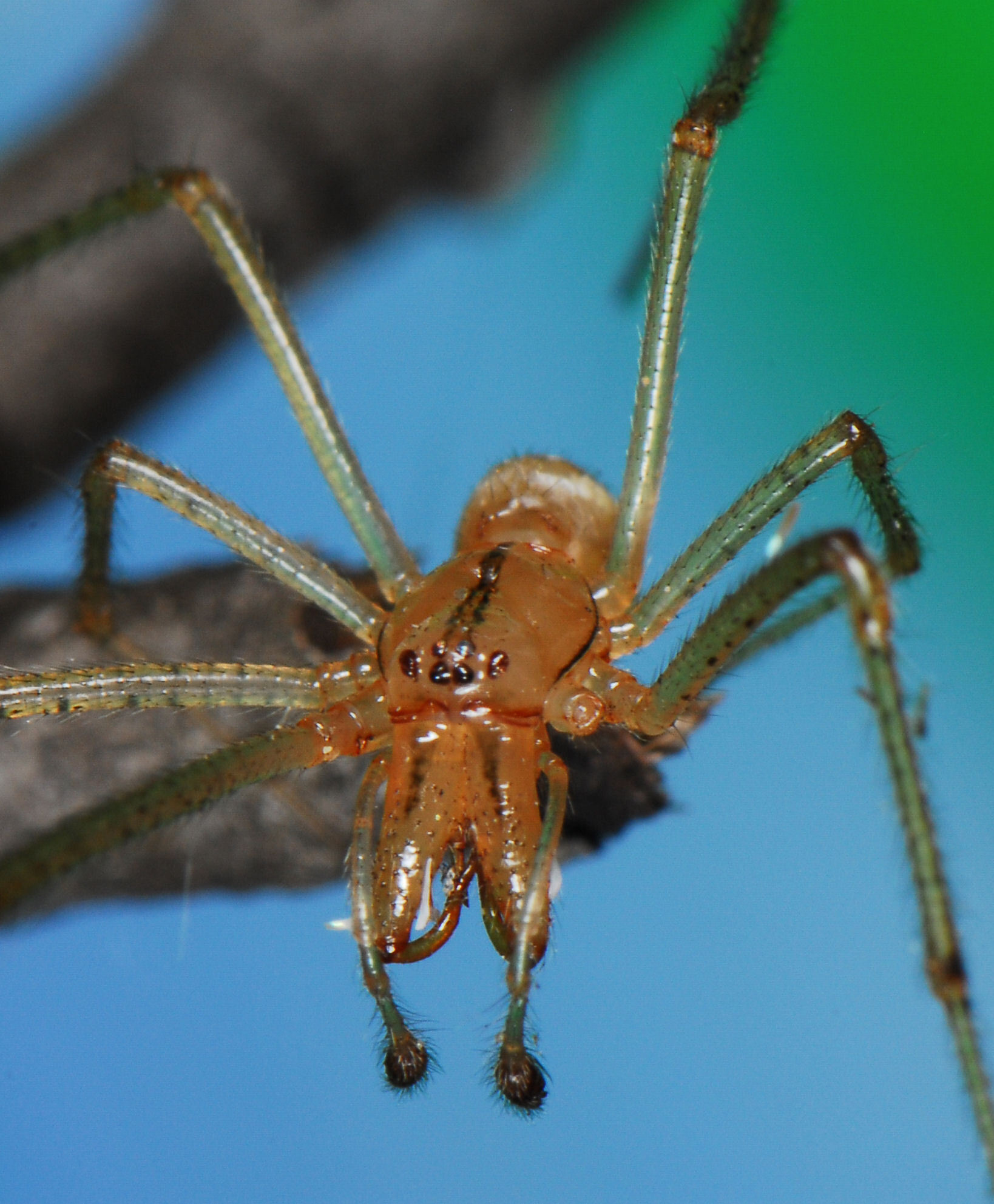
male E. molesta

Among the theridiids, they are medium to large sized. E. maricopa, a red-brown spider with a mottled purplish abdomen, has males that can reach a length of 3.4 millimetres (0.13 in), while females typically reach 2.9 millimetres (0.11 in). E. peruviana females can grow to 6.5 millimetres (0.26 in) long, and female E. zapfeae can reach up to 9.2 millimetres (0.36 in).

== Species ==
As of October 2025, this genus includes 75 species with a cosmopolitan distribution, including Greenland and Western Australia:

- Enoplognatha abrupta (Karsch, 1879) – Russia (Far East), China, Korea, Japan
- Enoplognatha afrodite Hippa & Oksala, 1983 – Southern Europe
- Enoplognatha almeriensis Bosmans & Van Keer, 1999 – Portugal, Spain
- Enoplognatha apaya Barrion & Litsinger, 1995 – Philippines
- Enoplognatha bidens Simon, 1908 – Australia (Western Australia)
- Enoplognatha biskrensis Denis, 1945 – Morocco, Algeria, Tunisia
- Enoplognatha bobaiensis Zhu, 1998 – China
- Enoplognatha bryjai Řezáč, 2016 – Czech Republic, Bulgaria, Ukraine
- Enoplognatha cariasoi Barrion & Litsinger, 1995 – Philippines
- Enoplognatha caricis (Fickert, 1876) – Europe, Turkey, Russia (Europe to Far East), China, Korea, Japan, Alaska, Canada, United States
- Enoplognatha carinata Bosmans & Van Keer, 1999 – Morocco, Algeria
- Enoplognatha daweiensis Yin & Yan, 2012 – China
- Enoplognatha deserta Levy & Amitai, 1981 – Morocco to Israel, Turkey, Russia (Europe)
- Enoplognatha diodonta Zhu & Zhang, 1992 – Pakistan, India, China, Korea
- Enoplognatha diversa (Blackwall, 1859) – Cape Verde, Canary Islands, Madeira, Morocco, Algeria, Tunisia, Portugal, Spain, France, Malta, Greece
- Enoplognatha franzi Wunderlich, 1995 – Portugal, Spain, Italy (Sicily), Malta, Morocco, Algeria, Tunisia, Israel, Iraq
- Enoplognatha fuyangensis Barrion & He, 2017 – China
- Enoplognatha gemina Bosmans & Van Keer, 1999 – Mediterranean, Azerbaijan, Iraq
- Enoplognatha gershomi Bosmans & Van Keer, 1999 – Israel, Iraq, Kazakhstan, Turkmenistan, Uzbekistan
- Enoplognatha giladensis (Levy & Amitai, 1982) – Greece (Rhodes), Turkey, Israel, Azerbaijan
- Enoplognatha goulouensis Yin & Yan, 2012 – China
- Enoplognatha gramineusa Zhu, 1998 – China, Korea
- Enoplognatha hermani Bosmans & Van Keer, 1999 – Algeria
- Enoplognatha inornata O. Pickard-Cambridge, 1904 – South Africa
- Enoplognatha intrepida (Sørensen, 1898) – Alaska, Canada, United States, Greenland
- Enoplognatha iraqi Najim, Al-Hadlak & Seyyar, 2015 – Iraq, Iran
- Enoplognatha joshua Chamberlin & Ivie, 1942 – Canada, United States
- Enoplognatha juninensis (Keyserling, 1884) – Peru
- Enoplognatha kalaykayina Barrion & Litsinger, 1995 – Philippines
- Enoplognatha latimana Hippa & Oksala, 1982 – Europe, North Africa, Turkey, Caucasus, Russia, (Europe), Iran. Introduced to Canada
- Enoplognatha lordosa Zhu & Song, 1992 – China, Japan
- Enoplognatha macrochelis Levy & Amitai, 1981 – North Macedonia, Greece, Turkey, Cyprus, Israel, Azerbaijan, Iran
- Enoplognatha malapahabanda Barrion & Litsinger, 1995 – Philippines
- Enoplognatha mandibularis (Lucas, 1846) – Europe, North Africa, Turkey, Israel, Russia, (Europe), China. Introduced to St. Helena (type species)
- Enoplognatha mangshan Yin, 2012 – China
- Enoplognatha margarita Yaginuma, 1964 – Russia (South Siberia, Far East), Mongolia, China, Korea, Japan
- Enoplognatha mariae Bosmans & Van Keer, 1999 – Greece, Russia (Caucasus)
- Enoplognatha maricopa Levi, 1962 – United States
- Enoplognatha marmorata (Hentz, 1850) – North America
- Enoplognatha maysanga Barrion & Litsinger, 1995 – Philippines
- Enoplognatha mediterranea Levy & Amitai, 1981 – Greece, Turkey, Cyprus, Israel, Georgia, Azerbaijan, Iran, Kazakhstan
- Enoplognatha melanicruciata Saito, 1939 – Japan
- Enoplognatha minuscula Wunderlich, 2023 – Portugal
- Enoplognatha molesta O. Pickard-Cambridge, 1904 – South Africa
- Enoplognatha monstrabilis Marusik & Logunov, 2002 – Russia (South Siberia)
- Enoplognatha mordax (Thorell, 1875) – Europe, North Africa, Turkey, Caucasus, Russia, (Europe), Iran, China
- Enoplognatha nigromarginata (Lucas, 1846) – Spain to Greece, Morocco, Algeria
- Enoplognatha oelandica (Thorell, 1875) – Europe, Caucasus, Kazakhstan, China
- Enoplognatha oreophila (Simon, 1895) – Sri Lanka
- Enoplognatha orientalis Schenkel, 1963 – China
- Enoplognatha ovata (Clerck, 1757) – Europe, Turkey, Caucasus, Russia (Europe to Middle Siberia), Kazakhstan, Iran, Central Asia, Korea, Japan. Introduced to North America
- Enoplognatha parathoracica Levy & Amitai, 1981 – Greece, Cyprus, Turkey, Caucasus, Israel
- Enoplognatha penelope Hippa & Oksala, 1982 – Albania, Bulgaria, Greece (incl. Crete), Cyprus
- Enoplognatha peruviana Chamberlin, 1916 – Peru
- Enoplognatha philippinensis Barrion & Litsinger, 1995 – Philippines
- Enoplognatha procerula Simon, 1909 – South Africa
- Enoplognatha pulatuberculata Barrion & Litsinger, 1995 – Philippines
- Enoplognatha puno Levi, 1962 – Peru
- Enoplognatha qiuae Zhu, 1998 – China
- Enoplognatha quadripunctata Simon, 1885 – Mediterranean, Caucasus, Iran, Kazakhstan
- Enoplognatha robusta Thorell, 1898 – Myanmar
- Enoplognatha sattleri Bösenberg, 1895 – Madeira, Salvages, Canary Islands
- Enoplognatha selma Chamberlin & Ivie, 1946 – United States
- Enoplognatha serratosignata (L. Koch, 1879) – Europe, Caucasus, Russia (Europe to Far East), Kazakhstan, China
- Enoplognatha submargarita Yaginuma & Zhu, 1992 – Iran, Kazakhstan, Kyrgyzstan, Russia (Central Asia), Mongolia, China
- Enoplognatha tadzhica Sytshevskaja, 1975 – Tajikistan
- Enoplognatha testacea Simon, 1884 – Southern, Central Europe to Central Asia
- Enoplognatha thoracica (Hahn, 1833) – Europe, North Africa, Turkey, Caucasus, Syria, Iran, Turkmenistan. Introduced to North America
- Enoplognatha turkestanica Charitonov, 1946 – Iran, Central Asia
- Enoplognatha tuybaana Barrion & Litsinger, 1995 – Philippines
- Enoplognatha verae Bosmans & Van Keer, 1999 – Morocco, Spain, Tunisia, Italy, Greece
- Enoplognatha wyuta Chamberlin & Ivie, 1942 – Canada, United States
- Enoplognatha yelpantrapensis Barrion & Litsinger, 1995 – Philippines
- Enoplognatha yizhangensis Yin, 2012 – China
- Enoplognatha zapfeae Levi, 1962 – Chile

List of synonyms
- E. aituarca Esyunin & Efimik, 1998 = Enoplognatha serratosignata (L. Koch, 1879)
- E. albimaculosa (Saito, 1934, T from Steatoda) = Enoplognatha caricis (Fickert, 1876)
- E. ambigua Kulczyński, 1894 = Enoplognatha serratosignata (L. Koch, 1879)
- E. arganoi (Brignoli, 1980, T from Robertus) = Enoplognatha testacea Simon, 1884
- E. camtschadalica Kulczyński, 1885 = Enoplognatha caricis (Fickert, 1876)
- E. corollata (Bertkau, 1883) = Enoplognatha oelandica (Thorell, 1875)
- E. cottarellii (Brignoli, 1980) = Enoplognatha testacea Simon, 1884
- E. crucifera (Thorell, 1875) = Enoplognatha mordax (Thorell, 1875)
- E. dorsinotata Bösenberg & Strand, 1906 = Enoplognatha caricis (Fickert, 1876)
- E. elimata (L. Koch, 1882, T from Theridion) = Enoplognatha diversa (Blackwall, 1859)
- E. hangzhouensis Zhu, 1998 = Enoplognatha abrupta (Karsch, 1879)
- E. hungarica Kolosváry, 1934 = Enoplognatha serratosignata (L. Koch, 1879)
- E. jacksoni Schenkel, 1927 = Enoplognatha serratosignata (L. Koch, 1879)
- E. japonica Bösenberg & Strand, 1906 = Enoplognatha caricis (Fickert, 1876)
- E. joshua Chamberlin & Ivie, 1942 = Enoplognatha joshua Chamberlin & Ivie, 1942
- E. krasnojarskensis (Strand, 1903, removed from S of Theridion undulatum) = Enoplognatha serratosignata (L. Koch, 1879)
- E. mansueta (L. Koch, 1882, T from Theridion) = Enoplognatha mandibularis (Lucas, 1846)
- E. maritima Simon, 1884 = Enoplognatha mordax (Thorell, 1875)
- E. marmorata Chamberlin & Ivie, 1942 = Enoplognatha marmorata (Hentz, 1850)
- E. militaris Wunderlich, 1995 = Enoplognatha latimana Hippa & Oksala, 1982
- E. mimoides (Chamberlin, 1920) = Enoplognatha marmorata (Hentz, 1850)
- E. nigrocincta Simon, 1884 = Enoplognatha mandibularis (Lucas, 1846)
- E. pikes Chamberlin & Ivie, 1942 = Enoplognatha intrepida (Sørensen, 1898)
- E. piuta Chamberlin & Ivie, 1942 = Enoplognatha joshua Chamberlin & Ivie, 1942
- E. puritana Chamberlin & Ivie, 1942 = Enoplognatha caricis (Fickert, 1876)
- E. redimita (Linnaeus, 1758, T from Theridion) = Enoplognatha ovata (Clerck, 1757)
- E. robustula Roewer, 1942 = Enoplognatha diversa (Blackwall, 1859)
- E. rugosa Emerton, 1908 = Enoplognatha intrepida (Sørensen, 1898)
- E. schaufussi (L. Koch, 1882) = Enoplognatha mordax (Thorell, 1875)
- E. submargarita Yaginuma & Zhu, 1992 = Enoplognatha margarita Yaginuma, 1964
- E. tecta Keyserling, 1884 = Enoplognatha caricis (Fickert, 1876)
- E. thoracicoides Nosek, 1905 = Enoplognatha quadripunctata Simon, 1884
- E. transversifoveata (Bösenberg & Strand, 1906) = Enoplognatha abrupta (Karsch, 1879)
