= Enoplognatha marmorata =

Scientific classification
- Domain: Eukaryota
- Kingdom: Animalia
- Phylum: Arthropoda
- Subphylum: Chelicerata
- Class: Arachnida
- Order: Araneae
- Infraorder: Araneomorphae
- Family: Theridiidae
- Genus: Enoplognatha
- Species: E. marmorata

Binomial name
- Enoplognatha marmorata (Hentz, 1850)

Species of spider

Enoplognatha marmorata, the marbled cobweb spider, is a species of cobweb spider in the family Theridiidae. It is found in North America.
