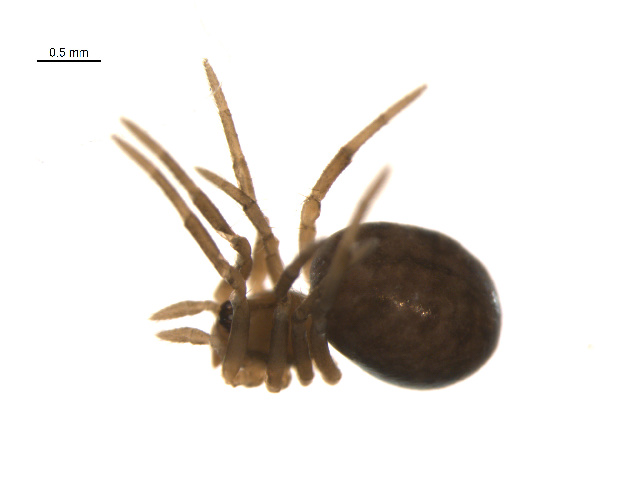
- E. intrepida

Scientific classification
- Domain: Eukaryota
- Kingdom: Animalia
- Phylum: Arthropoda
- Subphylum: Chelicerata
- Class: Arachnida
- Order: Araneae
- Infraorder: Araneomorphae
- Family: Theridiidae
- Genus: Enoplognatha
- Species: E. intrepida

Binomial name
- Enoplognatha intrepida (Sorensen, 1898)

= Enoplognatha intrepida =

Species of spider

Enoplognatha intrepida is a spider in the family Theridiidae ("cobweb spiders"), in the infraorder Araneomorphae ("true spiders"). The distribution range of Enoplognatha intrepida includes the USA, Canada, Greenland, and Korea.
