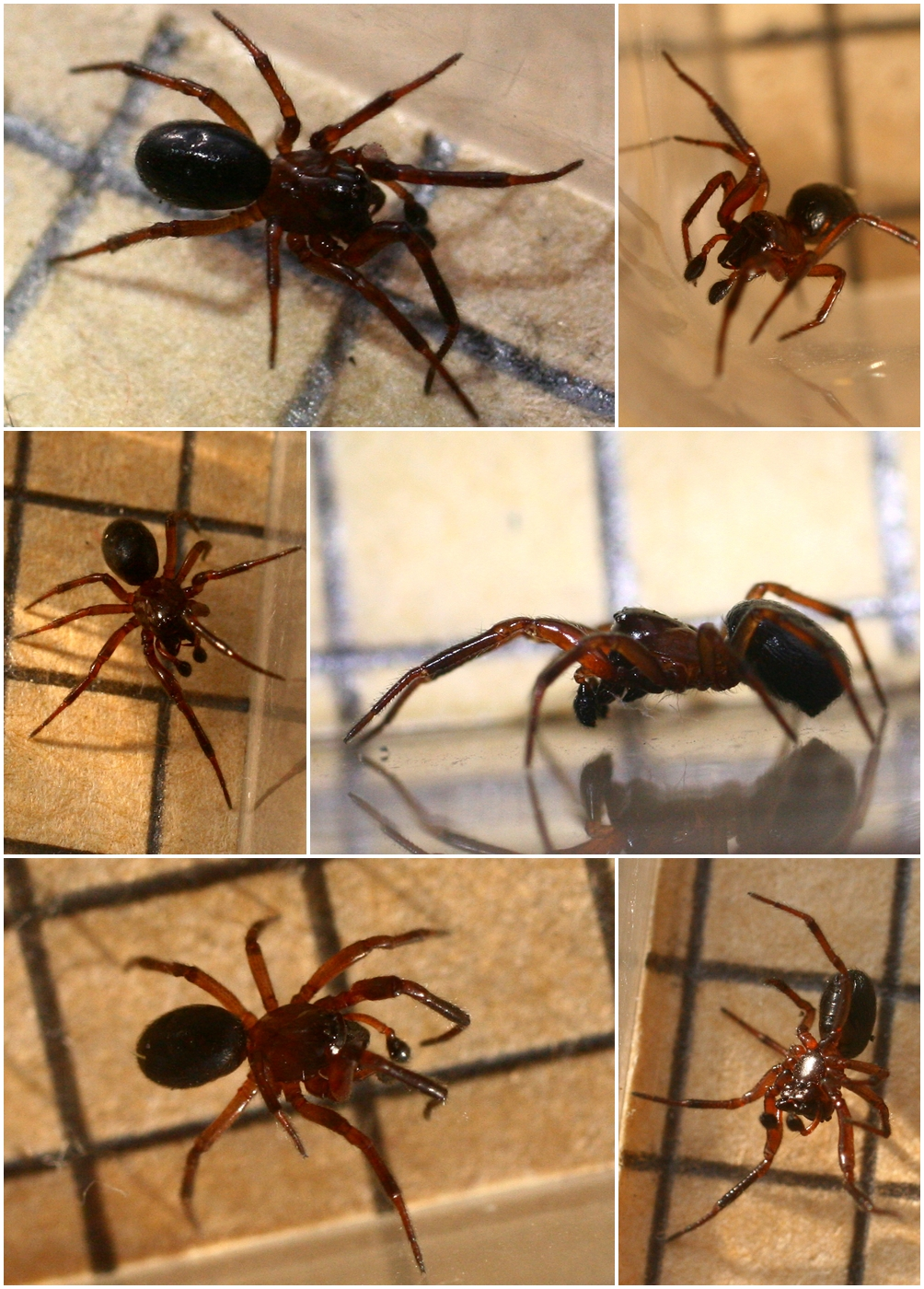
- Enoplognatha thoracica, approx 3.3mm long, found in leaf litter in woodland clearing, Bricket Wood Common, Hertfordshire, England, 23 May 2011.

Scientific classification
- Kingdom: Animalia
- Phylum: Arthropoda
- Subphylum: Chelicerata
- Class: Arachnida
- Order: Araneae
- Infraorder: Araneomorphae
- Family: Theridiidae
- Genus: Enoplognatha
- Species: E. thoracica

Binomial name
- Enoplognatha thoracica (Hahn, 1833)

= Enoplognatha thoracica =

Species of spider

Enoplognatha thoracica is a spider species with Holarctic distribution. It is notably found in Lithuania.
