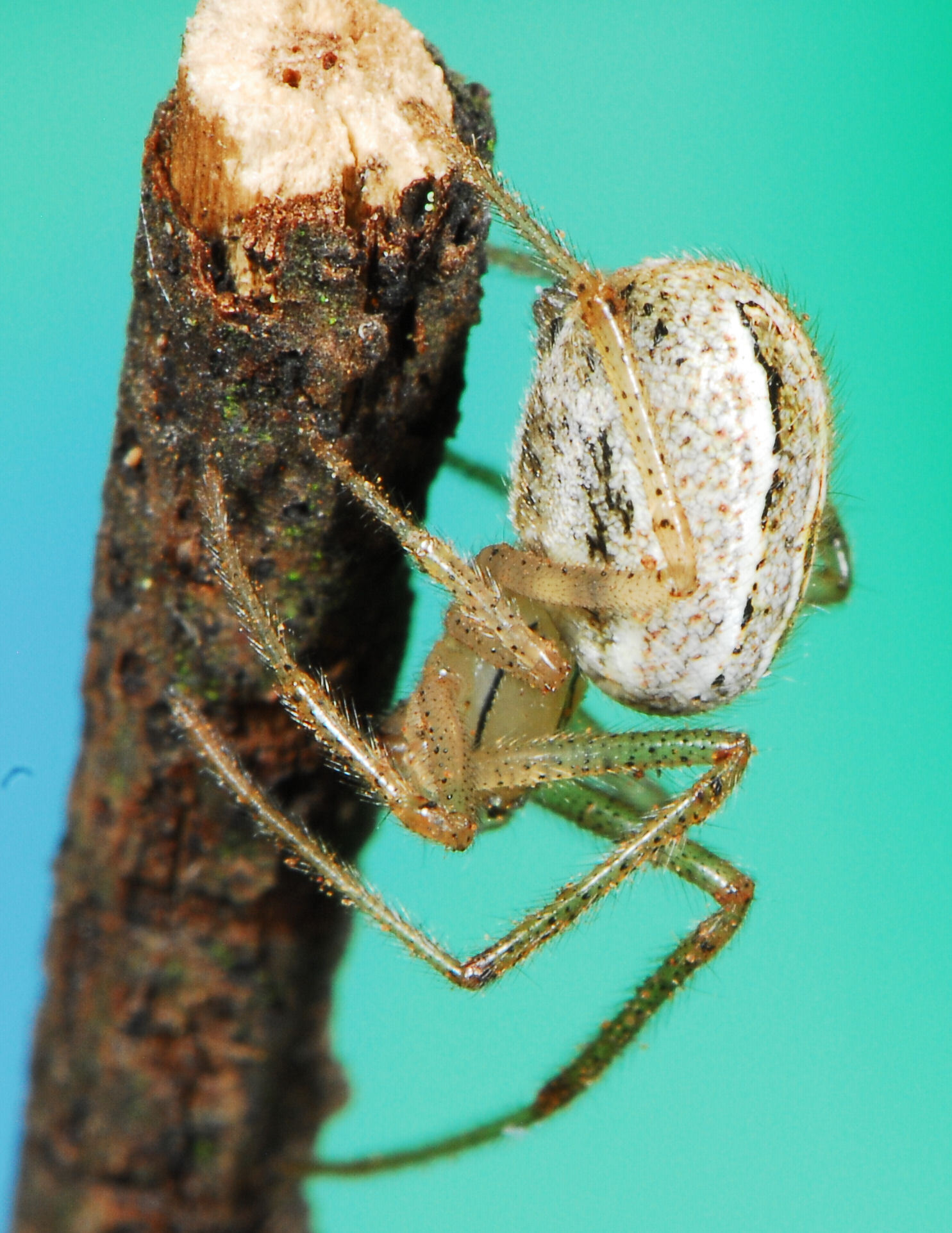
- Female
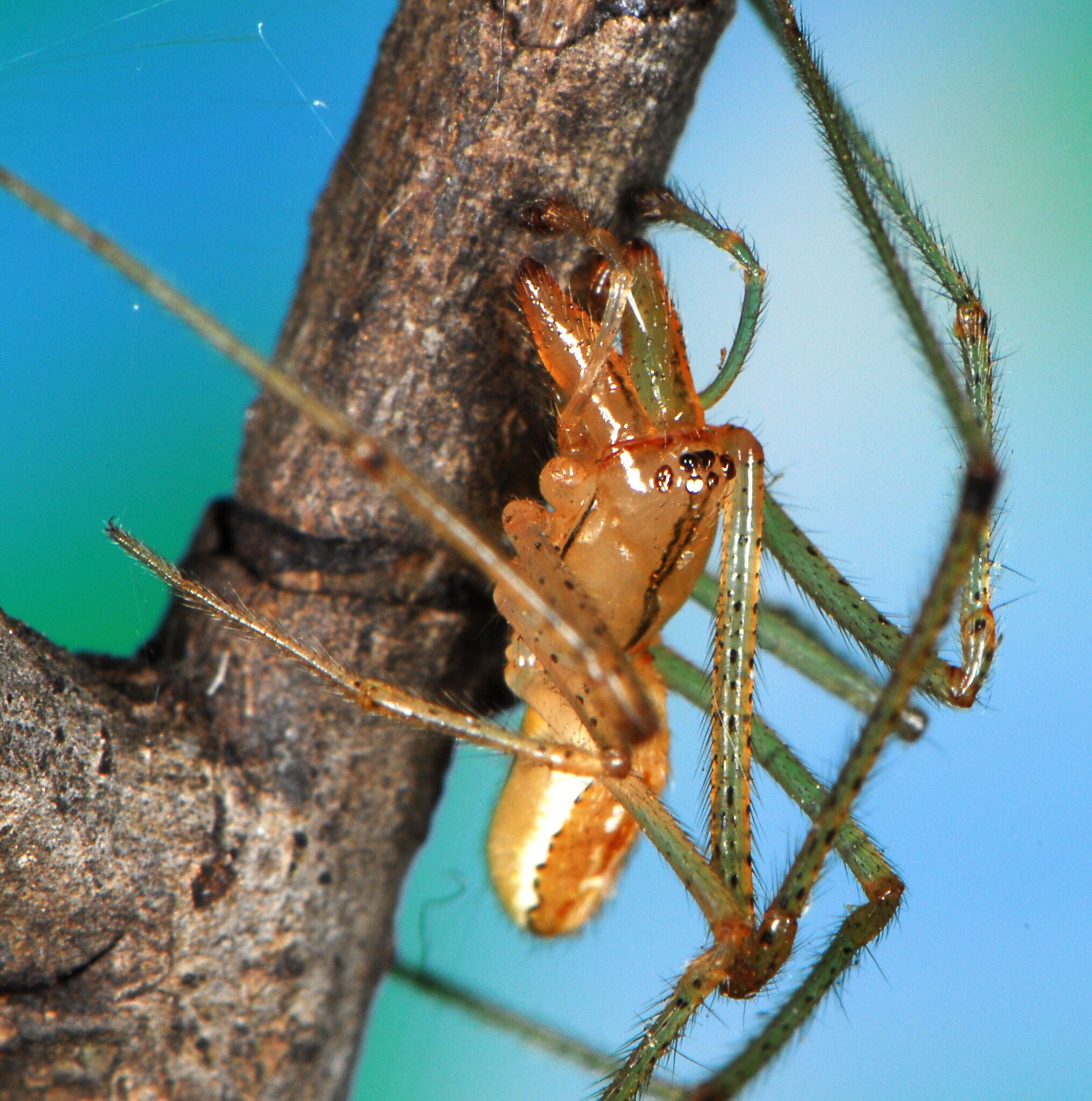
- Male

Scientific classification
- Kingdom: Animalia
- Phylum: Arthropoda
- Subphylum: Chelicerata
- Class: Arachnida
- Order: Araneae
- Infraorder: Araneomorphae
- Family: Theridiidae
- Genus: Enoplognatha
- Species: E. molesta

Binomial name
- Enoplognatha molesta O. Pickard-Cambridge, 1904

= Enoplognatha molesta =

Long Jawed Comb-Foot Spider

Species of spider

Enoplognatha molesta is a species of spider in the family Theridiidae. It is endemic to South Africa and is commonly known as the long jawed comb-foot spider.

== Distribution ==
Enoplognatha molesta is found only in South Africa, where it has a wide distribution throughout all nine provinces.

== Description ==
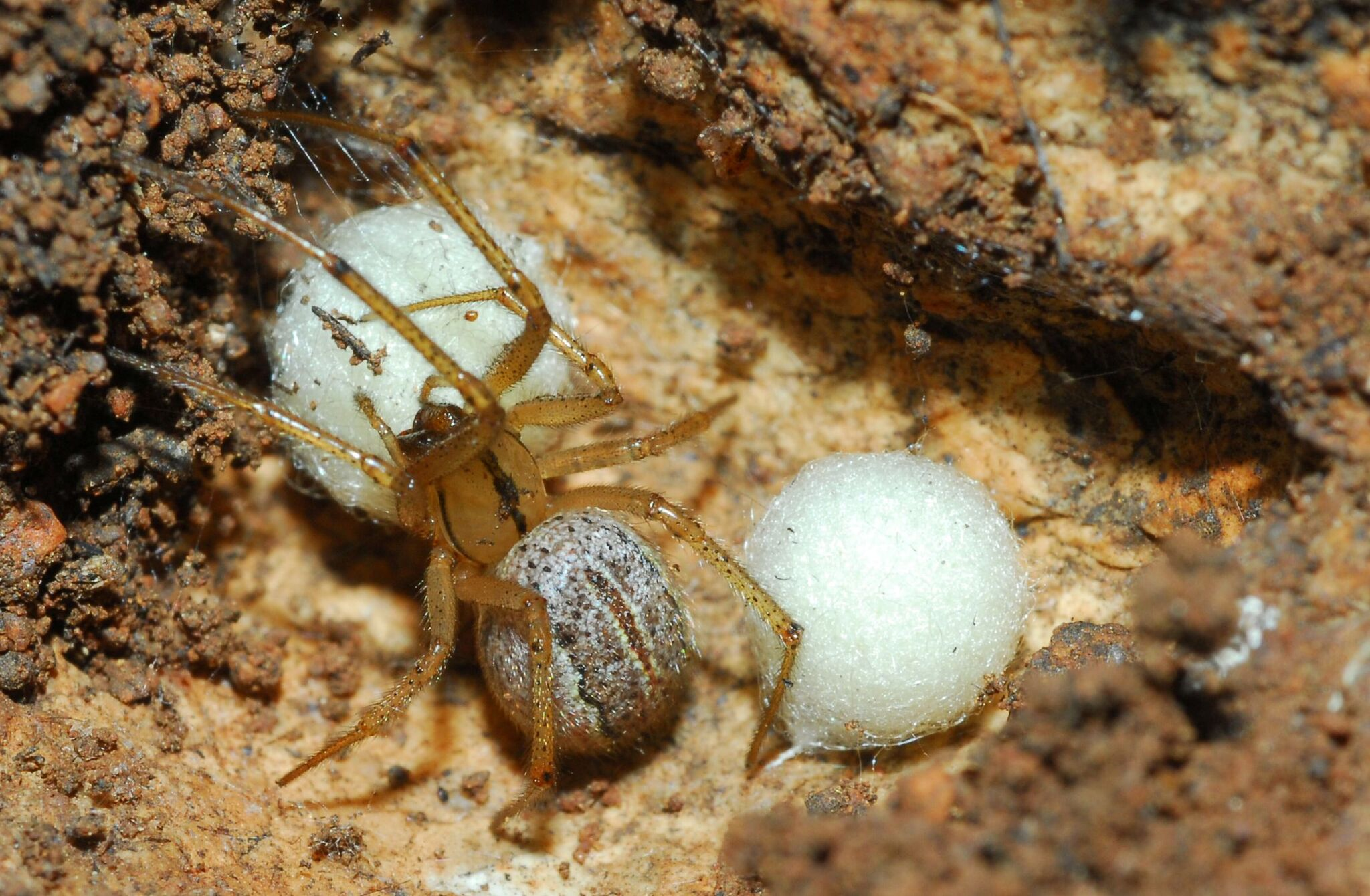
female with egg sacs

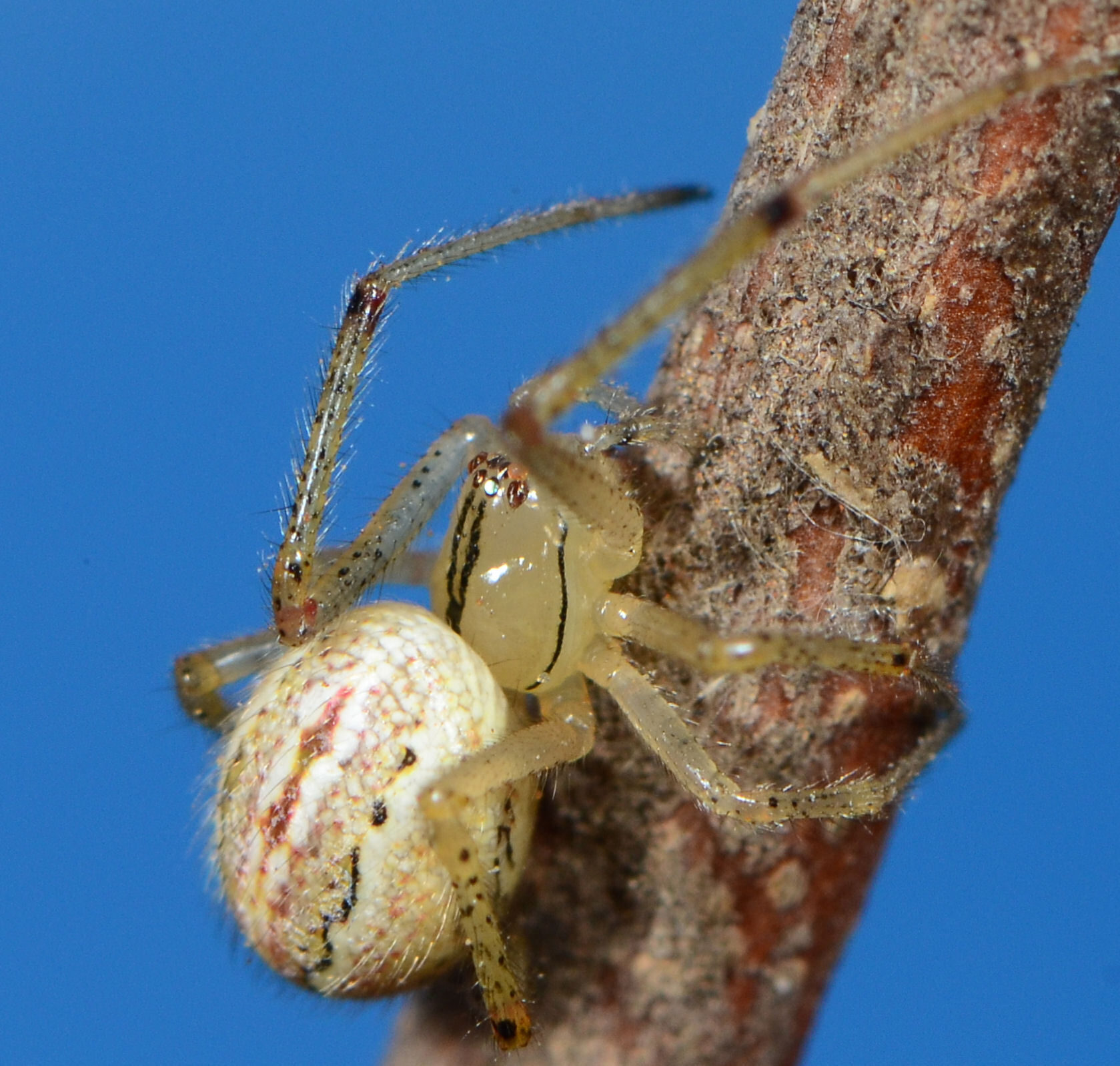
female

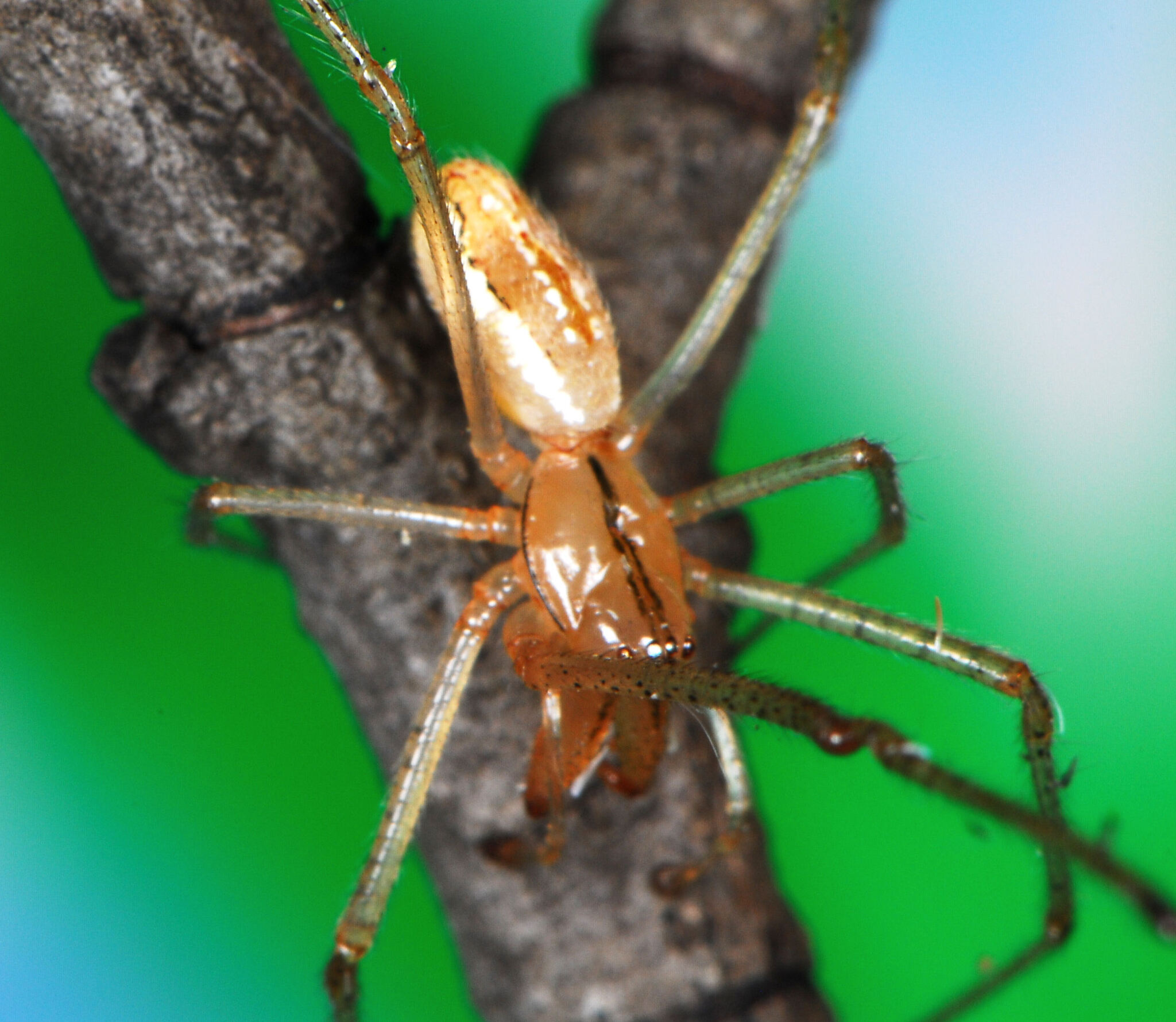
male

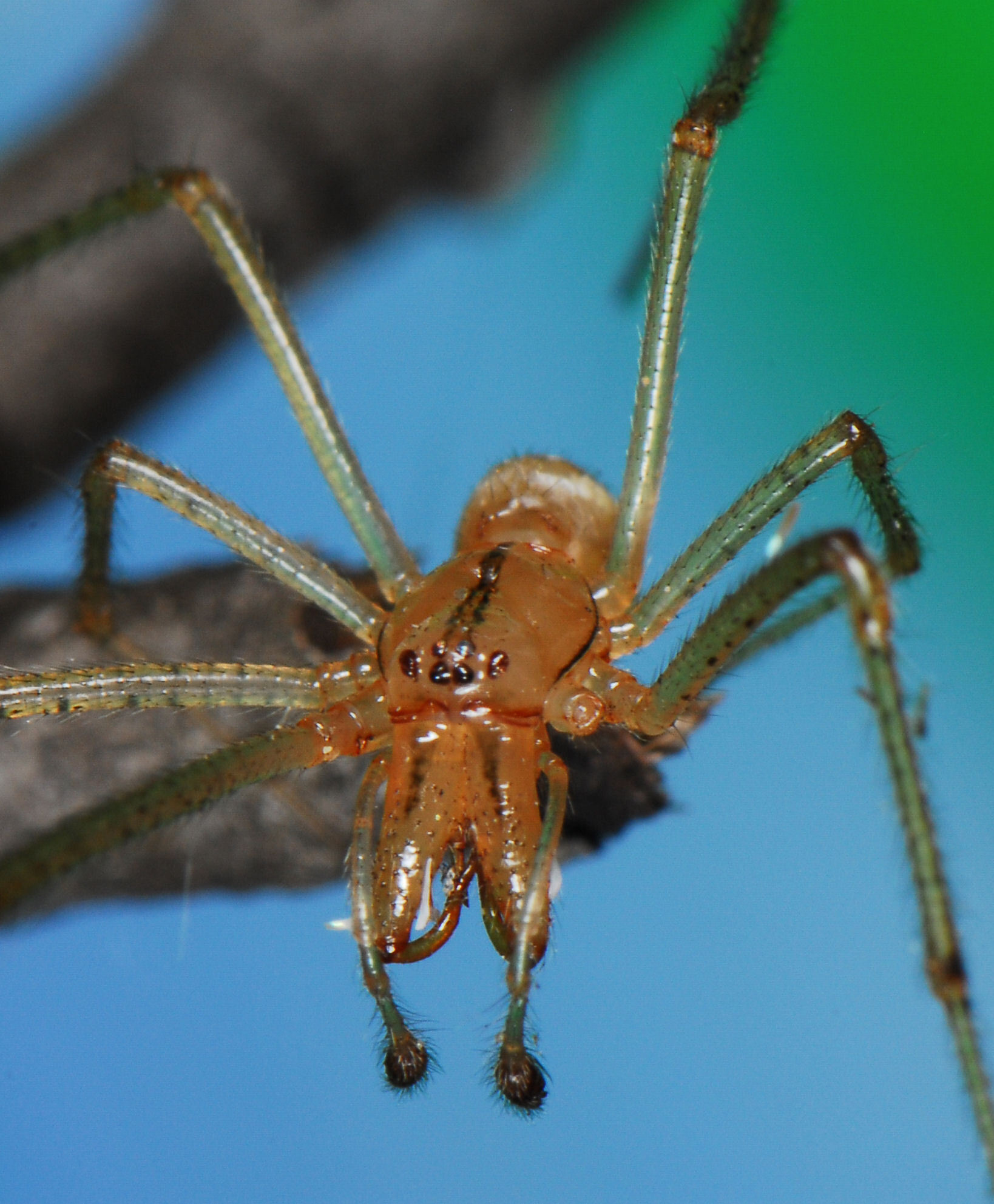
male

== Habitat and ecology ==
This species is very commonly found on vegetation as well as the soil surface. The species was very commonly sampled from crops: citrus, cotton, maize, potatoes, sorghum, strawberries, sugarcane, and tomatoes. It was found to be among the most abundant spiders collected from cotton. This species has been sampled from the Desert, Fynbos, Grassland, Savanna, and Succulent Karoo biomes.

The species has been sampled at altitudes ranging from 22 to 1998 m.

== Conservation ==
Enoplognatha molesta is listed as Least Concern by the South African National Biodiversity Institute due to its wide geographical range. There are no significant threats to this species. It is protected in more than ten protected areas.

== Taxonomy ==
Enoplognatha molesta was described by Octavius Pickard-Cambridge in 1904 from Simonstown. The species is known from both sexes.
