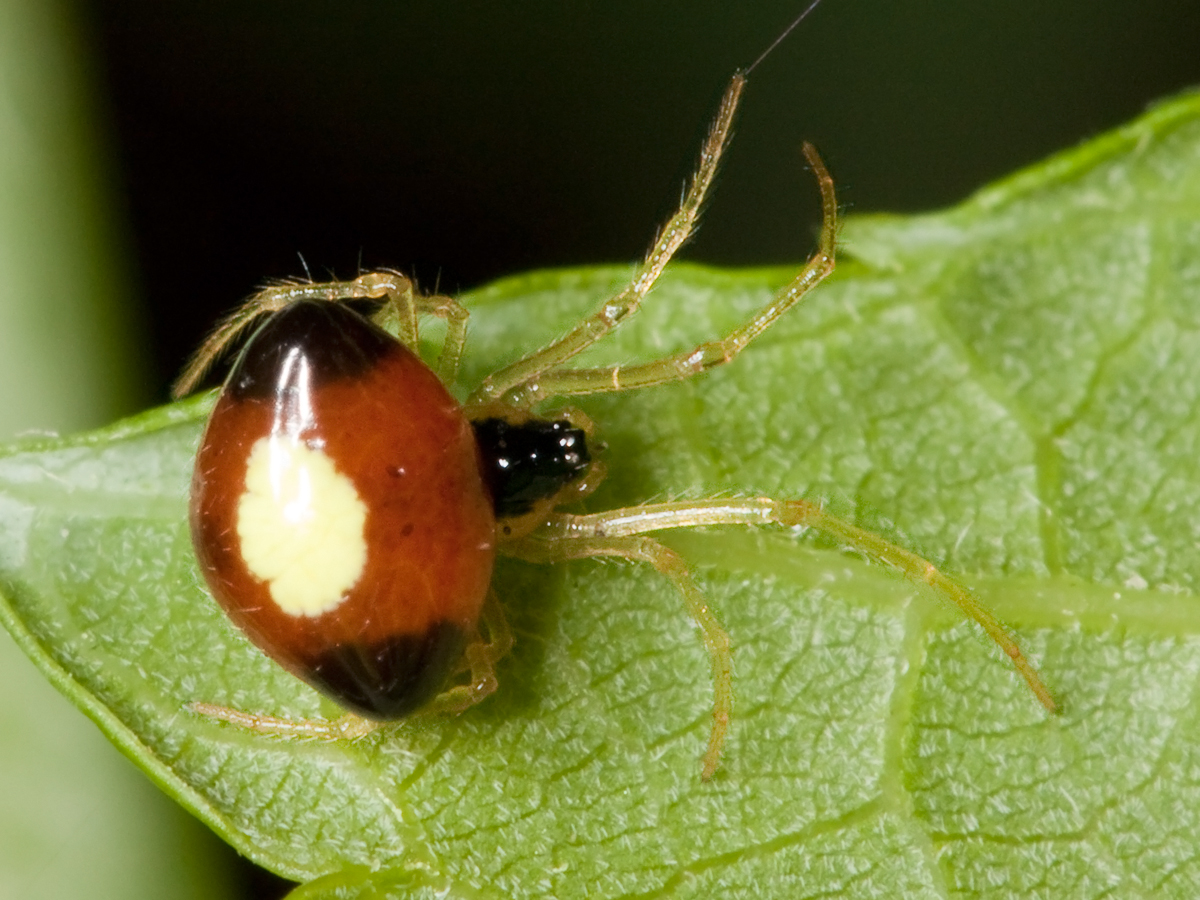
- Female Theridula emertoni

Scientific classification
- Domain: Eukaryota
- Kingdom: Animalia
- Phylum: Arthropoda
- Subphylum: Chelicerata
- Class: Arachnida
- Order: Araneae
- Infraorder: Araneomorphae
- Family: Theridiidae
- Genus: Theridula
- Species: T. emertoni

Binomial name
- Theridula emertoni Levi, 1954

Synonyms
- Theridula sphaerula Theridula opelenta

= Theridula emertoni =

Species of spider

Theridula emertoni is a species of tangle web spider commonly found in the United States and Canada. Prior to its formal description in 1954, specimens of T. emertoni were often classified as T. opulenta, a species with whom its range overlaps. The species can be reliably distinguished from T. opulenta by the epigyne in females or by the pedipalp in males.

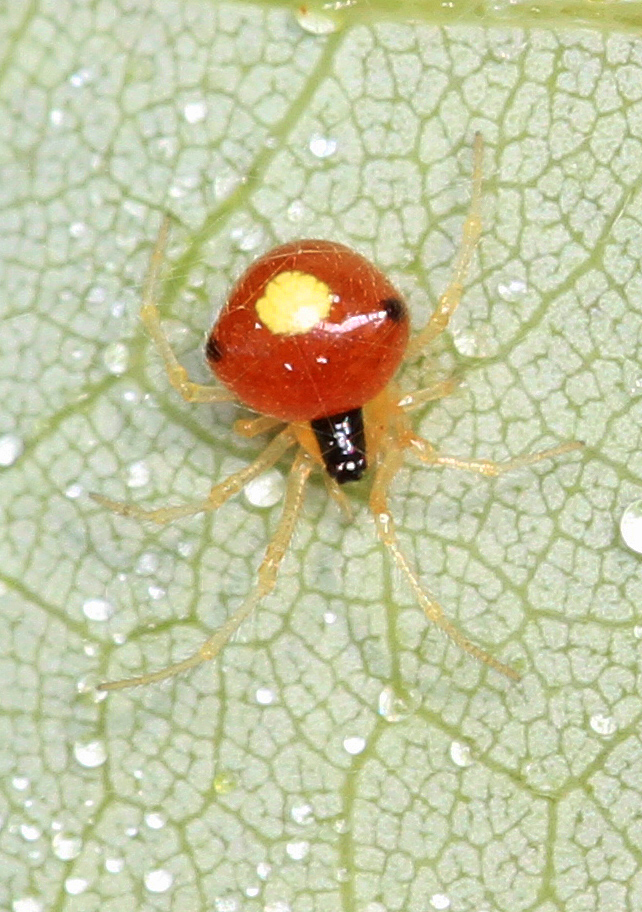
T. emertoni from Virginia

Adult females are between 1.7 and 2.8 mm in length. Adult males are between 1.6 and 2.3 mm in length.
