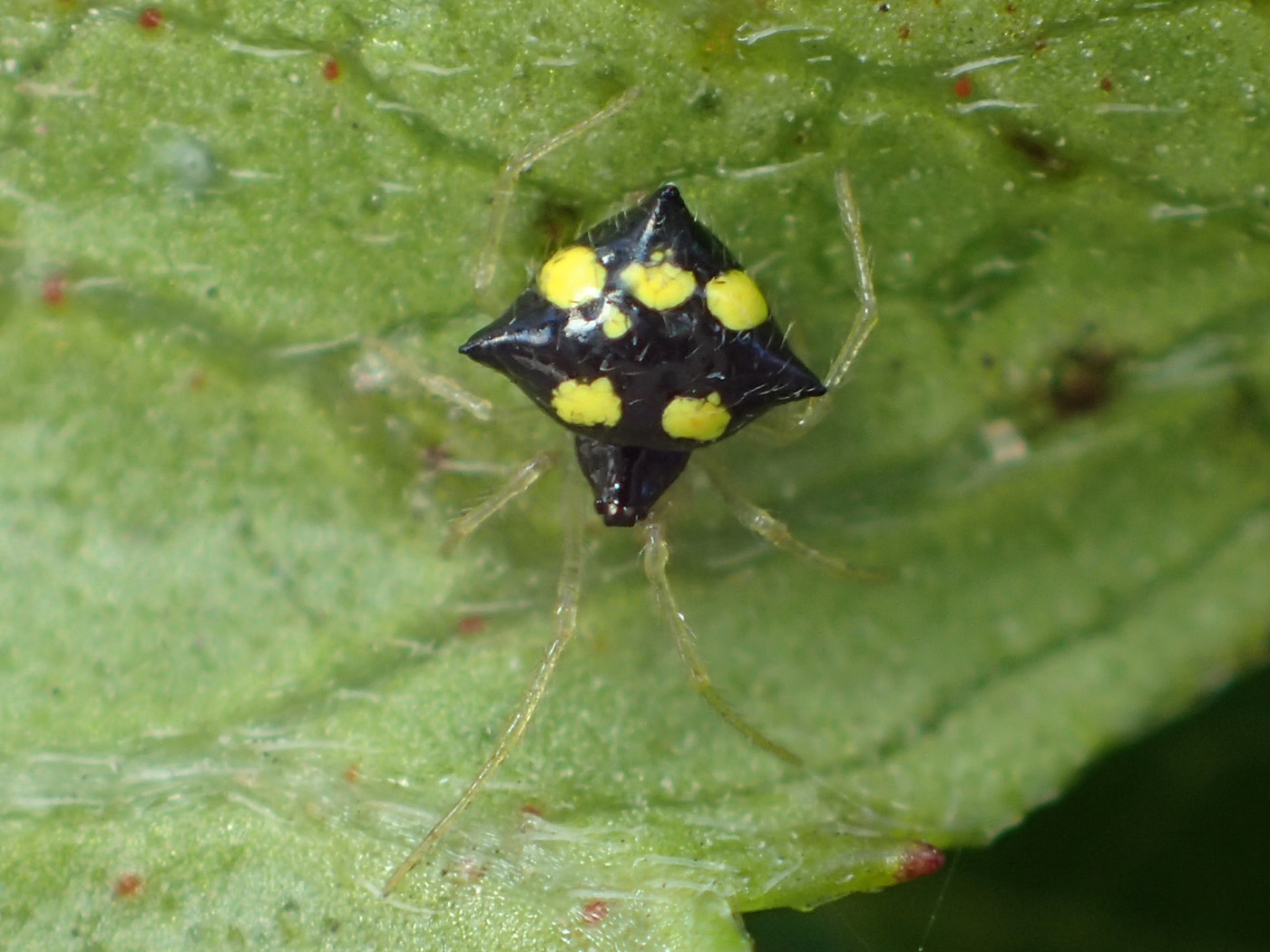

Scientific classification
- Kingdom: Animalia
- Phylum: Arthropoda
- Subphylum: Chelicerata
- Class: Arachnida
- Order: Araneae
- Infraorder: Araneomorphae
- Family: Theridiidae
- Genus: Theridula
- Species: T. gonygaster

Binomial name
- Theridula gonygaster (Simon, 1873)

= Theridula gonygaster =

Species of spider

Theridula gonygaster is a species of cobweb spider in the family Theridiidae. It is found in Central and South America, Caribbean, has been introduced into SW Europe, the Congo, Madagascar, Seychelles, China, and Japan.
