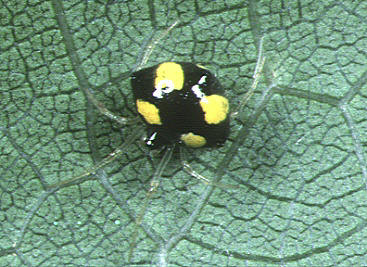
- Female Theridula gonygaster from Okinawa

Scientific classification
- Kingdom: Animalia
- Phylum: Arthropoda
- Subphylum: Chelicerata
- Class: Arachnida
- Order: Araneae
- Infraorder: Araneomorphae
- Family: Theridiidae
- Genus: Theridula; Emerton, 1882

Species
- See text

Diversity
- 19 species

= Theridula =

Genus of spiders

Theridula is a genus of cobweb spiders, found in many (mostly tropical) parts of the world. Species vary in size from 1 to 3.5 mm in length.

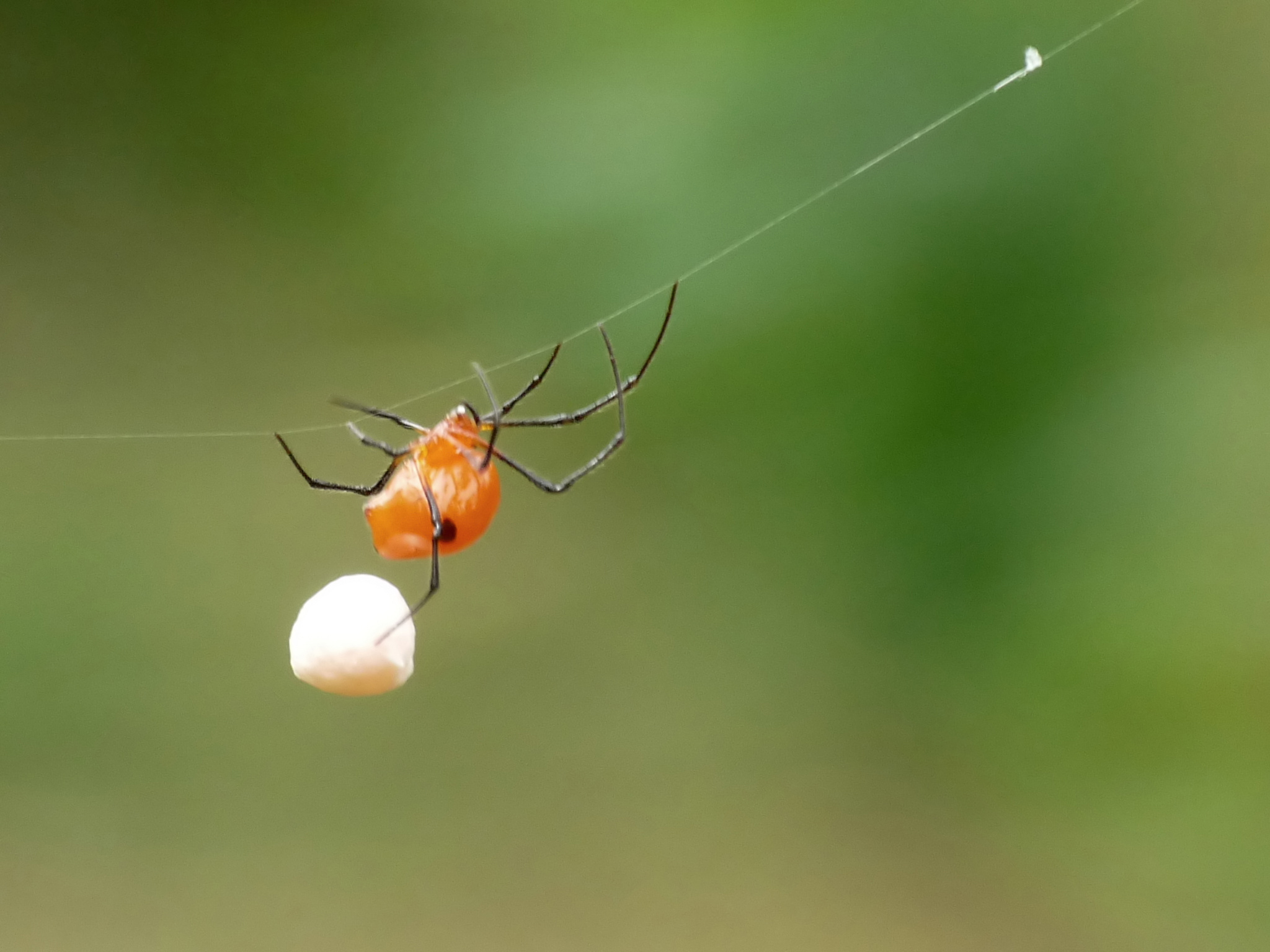
Theridula angula moving from one tree to another carrying the egg sac

In females, the abdomen is wider than long, with a hump or horn on each side, and sometimes a posterior median horn. The pedipalp in males is simple, lacking a conductor or theridioid tegular apophysis.

Theridula spiders are frequently found on bushes or tall grass where they rest on the undersides of leaves near their webs.

== Species ==
- Theridula albonigra Caporiacco, 1949 (Kenya)
  - Theridula albonigra vittata Caporiacco, 1949 (Kenya)
- Theridula angula Tikader, 1970 (India)
- Theridula casas Levi, 1954 (Mexico)
- Theridula emertoni Levi, 1954 (USA, Canada)
- Theridula faceta (O. P.-Cambridge, 1894) (Mexico, Guatemala)
- Theridula gonygaster (Simon, 1873) (Cosmopolitan)
- Theridula huberti Benoit, 1977 (St. Helena)
- Theridula iriomotensis Yoshida, 2001 (Japan)
- Theridula multiguttata Keyserling, 1896 (Brazil)
- Theridula nigerrima (Petrunkevitch, 1911) (Ecuador, Peru)
- Theridula opulenta (Walckenaer, 1842) (Cosmopolitan)
- Theridula perlata Simon, 1889 (Madagascar)
- Theridula puebla Levi, 1954 (Mexico, Panama)
- Theridula pulchra Berland, 1920 (East Africa)
- Theridula sexpupillata Mello-Leitão, 1941 (Brazil)
- Theridula swatiae Biswas, Saha & Raychaydhuri, 1997 (India)
- Theridula theriella Strand, 1907 (Madagascar)
- Theridula zhangmuensis Hu, 2001 (China)
