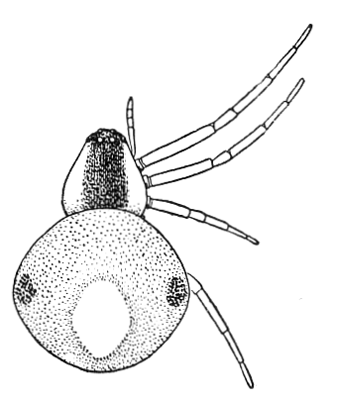

Scientific classification
- Domain: Eukaryota
- Kingdom: Animalia
- Phylum: Arthropoda
- Subphylum: Chelicerata
- Class: Arachnida
- Order: Araneae
- Infraorder: Araneomorphae
- Family: Theridiidae
- Genus: Theridula
- Species: T. opulenta

Binomial name
- Theridula opulenta (Walckenaer, 1841)

= Theridula opulenta =

Species of spider

Theridula opulenta is a species of cobweb spider in the family Theridiidae. It is found in North America and has been introduced into southern Europe.
