= Hadrotarsus setosus =

Scientific classification
- Domain: Eukaryota
- Kingdom: Animalia
- Phylum: Arthropoda
- Subphylum: Chelicerata
- Class: Arachnida
- Order: Araneae
- Infraorder: Araneomorphae
- Family: Theridiidae
- Genus: Hadrotarsus
- Species: H. setosus

Binomial name
- Hadrotarsus setosus Hickman, 1943

Species of spider

Hadrotarsus setosus is a species of comb-footed spider in the family Theridiidae. It is found in Tasmania.

The species was described in 1943 by V. V. Hickman.
