= Propostira quadrangulata =

Scientific classification
- Kingdom: Animalia
- Phylum: Arthropoda
- Subphylum: Chelicerata
- Class: Arachnida
- Order: Araneae
- Infraorder: Araneomorphae
- Family: Theridiidae
- Genus: Propostira
- Species: P. quadrangulata

Binomial name
- Propostira quadrangulata Simon, 1894

Species of spider

Propostira quadrangulata, is a species of spider of the genus Propostira. It is native to India and Sri Lanka.
