= Yoroa taylori =

Scientific classification
- Domain: Eukaryota
- Kingdom: Animalia
- Phylum: Arthropoda
- Subphylum: Chelicerata
- Class: Arachnida
- Order: Araneae
- Infraorder: Araneomorphae
- Family: Theridiidae
- Genus: Yoroa
- Species: Y. taylori

Binomial name
- Yoroa taylori Harvey & Waldock, 2000

Species of spider

Yoroa taylori is a species of comb-footed spider in the family Theridiidae. It is found in Queensland.

The species was discovered in northern Queensland, the authors describing a new species and revising a previously monotypic genus.
