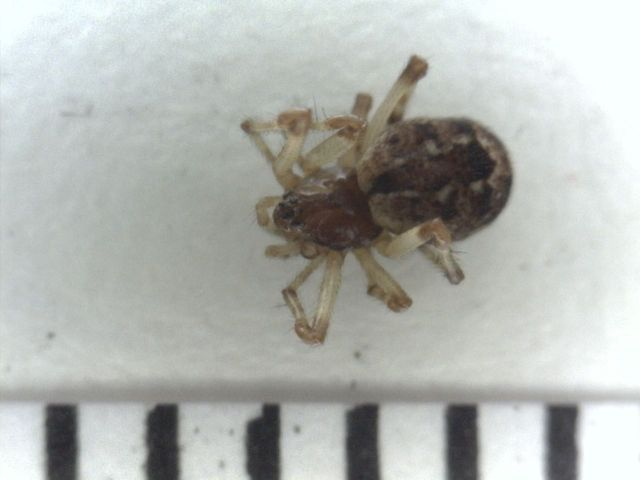

Scientific classification
- Kingdom: Animalia
- Phylum: Arthropoda
- Subphylum: Chelicerata
- Class: Arachnida
- Order: Araneae
- Infraorder: Araneomorphae
- Family: Theridiidae
- Genus: Ohlertidion
- Species: O. ohlerti

Binomial name
- Ohlertidion ohlerti (Thorell, 1870)

= Ohlertidion ohlerti =

Species of spider

Ohlertidion ohlerti is a species of comb-footed spider in the family Theridiidae. It is found in North America, Europe, and Russian Asia.
