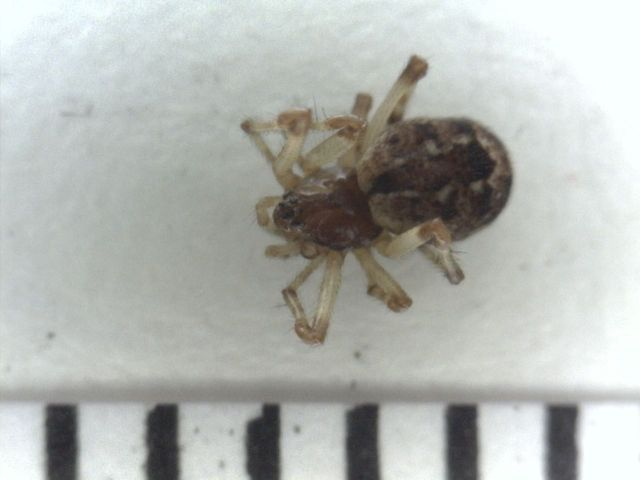
- O. ohlerti

Scientific classification
- Kingdom: Animalia
- Phylum: Arthropoda
- Subphylum: Chelicerata
- Class: Arachnida
- Order: Araneae
- Infraorder: Araneomorphae
- Family: Theridiidae
- Genus: Ohlertidion; Wunderlich, 2008

Type species
- O. ohlerti (Thorell, 1870)

Species
- O. lundbecki (Sørensen, 1898) – Greenland; O. ohlerti (Thorell, 1870) – North America, Europe, Russia (Europe to Far East); O. thaleri (Marusik, 1988) – Russia (north-eastern Siberia, Far East)

= Ohlertidion =

Genus of spiders

Ohlertidion is a genus of comb-footed spiders (family Theridiidae) that was first described by J. Wunderlich in 2008. As of September 2019 it contains three species with a holarctic distribution, including Greenland: O. lundbecki, O. ohlerti, and O. thaleri. A 2019 genetic study proposed to synonymize this genus with Heterotheridion; however, the evidence was based predominantly on COI barcoding, which is a useful tool for separating species, but is less useful for determining higher taxa.

== See also ==
- Heterotheridion
