= Tomoxena alearia =

Scientific classification
- Kingdom: Animalia
- Phylum: Arthropoda
- Subphylum: Chelicerata
- Class: Arachnida
- Order: Araneae
- Infraorder: Araneomorphae
- Family: Theridiidae
- Genus: Tomoxena
- Species: T. alearia

Binomial name
- Tomoxena alearia (Thorell, 1890)

Species of spider

Tomoxena alearia is a species of comb-footed spider in the family Theridiidae. It is found in Java and Sumatra.
