= Yoroa clypeoglandularis =

Scientific classification
- Domain: Eukaryota
- Kingdom: Animalia
- Phylum: Arthropoda
- Subphylum: Chelicerata
- Class: Arachnida
- Order: Araneae
- Infraorder: Araneomorphae
- Family: Theridiidae
- Genus: Yoroa
- Species: Y. clypeoglandularis

Binomial name
- Yoroa clypeoglandularis Baert, 1984

Species of spider

Yoroa clypeoglandularis is a species of comb-footed spider in the family Theridiidae. It is found in New Guinea.
