= Ohlertidion thaleri =

Scientific classification
- Kingdom: Animalia
- Phylum: Arthropoda
- Subphylum: Chelicerata
- Class: Arachnida
- Order: Araneae
- Infraorder: Araneomorphae
- Family: Theridiidae
- Genus: Ohlertidion
- Species: O. thaleri

Binomial name
- Ohlertidion thaleri (Marusik, 1988)

Species of spider

Ohlertidion thaleri is a species of comb-footed spider in the family Theridiidae. It is found in the Russian Far East.
