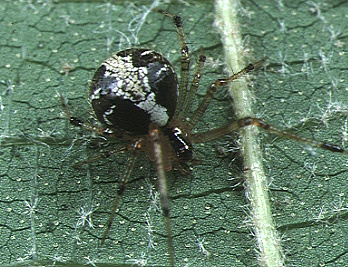

Scientific classification
- Kingdom: Animalia
- Phylum: Arthropoda
- Subphylum: Chelicerata
- Class: Arachnida
- Order: Araneae
- Infraorder: Araneomorphae
- Family: Theridiidae
- Genus: Nipponidion
- Species: N. okinawense

Binomial name
- Nipponidion okinawense Yoshida, 2001

= Nipponidion okinawense =

Species of spider

Nipponidion okinawense is a species of comb-footed spider in the family Theridiidae. It is found in Okinawa (Japan).

Males measure 2.11–2.47 mm (0.08–0.10 in) and females 2.84–3.53 mm (0.11–0.14 in) in body length.
