= Selkirkiella wellingtoni =

Scientific classification
- Kingdom: Animalia
- Phylum: Arthropoda
- Subphylum: Chelicerata
- Class: Arachnida
- Order: Araneae
- Infraorder: Araneomorphae
- Family: Theridiidae
- Genus: Selkirkiella
- Species: S. wellingtoni

Binomial name
- Selkirkiella wellingtoni (Levi, 1967)

Species of spider

Selkirkiella wellingtoni is a species of comb-footed spider in the family Theridiidae. It is found in Chile.
