= Nipponidion yaeyamense =

Scientific classification
- Kingdom: Animalia
- Phylum: Arthropoda
- Subphylum: Chelicerata
- Class: Arachnida
- Order: Araneae
- Infraorder: Araneomorphae
- Family: Theridiidae
- Genus: Nipponidion
- Species: N. yaeyamense

Binomial name
- Nipponidion yaeyamense (Yoshida, 1993)

Species of spider

Nipponidion yaeyamense is a species of comb-footed spider in the family Theridiidae. It is found in Japan.
