= Wirada tijuca =

Scientific classification
- Domain: Eukaryota
- Kingdom: Animalia
- Phylum: Arthropoda
- Subphylum: Chelicerata
- Class: Arachnida
- Order: Araneae
- Infraorder: Araneomorphae
- Family: Theridiidae
- Genus: Wirada
- Species: W. tijuca

Binomial name
- Wirada tijuca Levi, 1967

Species of spider

Wirada tijuca is a species of comb-footed spider in the family Theridiidae. It is found in Brazil.
