= Wirada tovarensis =

- Male

Scientific classification
- Kingdom: Animalia
- Phylum: Arthropoda
- Subphylum: Chelicerata
- Class: Arachnida
- Order: Araneae
- Infraorder: Araneomorphae
- Family: Theridiidae
- Genus: Wirada
- Species: W. tovarensis

Binomial name
- Wirada tovarensis Simon, 1895

Species of spider

Wirada tovarensis is a species of comb-footed spider in the family Theridiidae. It is found in Venezuela.
