= Montanidion =

Scientific classification
- Kingdom: Animalia
- Phylum: Arthropoda
- Subphylum: Chelicerata
- Class: Arachnida
- Order: Araneae
- Infraorder: Araneomorphae
- Family: Theridiidae
- Genus: Montanidion; Wunderlich, 2011
- Species: M. kuantanense

Binomial name
- Montanidion kuantanense Wunderlich, 2011

Genus of spiders

Montanidion is a monotypic genus of Malaysian comb-footed spiders containing the single species, Montanidion kuantanense. It was first described by J. Wunderlich in 2011, and is found in Malaysia. The structure of the male pedipalp indicates that it may be related to members of Tamanidion.
