= Selkirkiella ventrosa =

Scientific classification
- Domain: Eukaryota
- Kingdom: Animalia
- Phylum: Arthropoda
- Subphylum: Chelicerata
- Class: Arachnida
- Order: Araneae
- Infraorder: Araneomorphae
- Family: Theridiidae
- Genus: Selkirkiella
- Species: S. ventrosa

Binomial name
- Selkirkiella ventrosa (Nicolet, 1849)

Species of spider

Selkirkiella ventrosa is a species of comb-footed spider in the family Theridiidae. It is found in Chile, Argentina, and the Falklands.
