= Audifia duodecimpunctata =

Scientific classification
- Kingdom: Animalia
- Phylum: Arthropoda
- Subphylum: Chelicerata
- Class: Arachnida
- Order: Araneae
- Infraorder: Araneomorphae
- Family: Theridiidae
- Genus: Audifia
- Species: A. duodecimpunctata

Binomial name
- Audifia duodecimpunctata Simon, 1907

Species of spider

Audifia duodecimpunctata is a species of cobweb spider in the family Theridiidae. It is found in Guinea-Bissau and the Congo.
