= Wirada punctata =

- Female

Scientific classification
- Domain: Eukaryota
- Kingdom: Animalia
- Phylum: Arthropoda
- Subphylum: Chelicerata
- Class: Arachnida
- Order: Araneae
- Infraorder: Araneomorphae
- Family: Theridiidae
- Genus: Wirada
- Species: W. punctata

Binomial name
- Wirada punctata Keyserling, 1886

Species of spider

Wirada punctata is a species of comb-footed spider in the family Theridiidae. It is found in Venezuela, Ecuador, and Peru.
