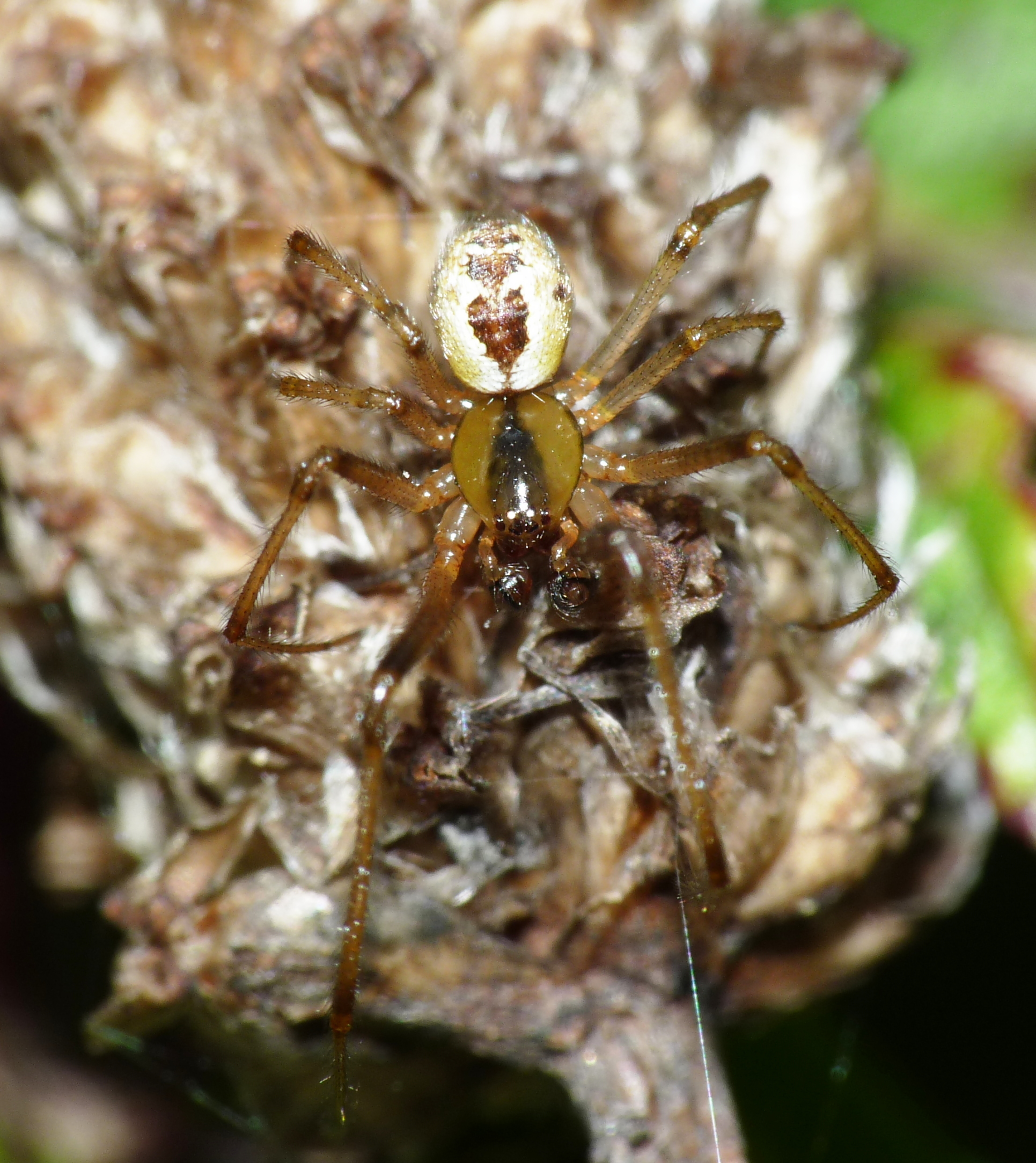
- Male

Scientific classification
- Domain: Eukaryota
- Kingdom: Animalia
- Phylum: Arthropoda
- Subphylum: Chelicerata
- Class: Arachnida
- Order: Araneae
- Infraorder: Araneomorphae
- Family: Theridiidae
- Genus: Kochiura
- Species: K. aulica

Binomial name
- Kochiura aulica (C. L. Koch, 1838)

Synonyms
- Several, including: Theridion aulicum C. L. Koch, 1838; Theridion elegans Blackwall, 1862

= Kochiura aulica =

Species of spider

Kochiura aulica is a species of spiders in the family Theridiidae. It is found on the Canary Islands, Cape Verde Islands to Azerbaijan.
