= Audifia semigranosa =

Scientific classification
- Kingdom: Animalia
- Phylum: Arthropoda
- Subphylum: Chelicerata
- Class: Arachnida
- Order: Araneae
- Infraorder: Araneomorphae
- Family: Theridiidae
- Genus: Audifia
- Species: A. semigranosa

Binomial name
- Audifia semigranosa Simon, 1895

Species of spider

Audifia semigranosa is a species of cobweb spider in the family Theridiidae. It is found in Brazil.
