= Wirada mexicana =

Scientific classification
- Kingdom: Animalia
- Phylum: Arthropoda
- Subphylum: Chelicerata
- Class: Arachnida
- Order: Araneae
- Infraorder: Araneomorphae
- Family: Theridiidae
- Genus: Wirada
- Species: W. mexicana

Binomial name
- Wirada mexicana Campuzano & Ibarra-Núñez, 2018

Species of spider

Wirada mexicana is a species of comb-footed spider (also known as cobweb spiders) in the family Theridiidae. It is found in Mexico.. It was first described by Campuzano, E. F. & Ibarra-Núñez, G. in 2018.
