= Propostira ranii =

Scientific classification
- Kingdom: Animalia
- Phylum: Arthropoda
- Subphylum: Chelicerata
- Class: Arachnida
- Order: Araneae
- Infraorder: Araneomorphae
- Family: Theridiidae
- Genus: Propostira
- Species: P. ranii

Binomial name
- Propostira ranii Bhattacharya, 1935

Species of spider

Propostira ranii is a species of spider native to western India and Bangladesh.
