= Audifia laevithorax =

Scientific classification
- Kingdom: Animalia
- Phylum: Arthropoda
- Subphylum: Chelicerata
- Class: Arachnida
- Order: Araneae
- Infraorder: Araneomorphae
- Family: Theridiidae
- Genus: Audifia
- Species: A. laevithorax

Binomial name
- Audifia laevithorax Keyserling, 1884

Species of spider

Audifia laevithorax is a species of cobweb spider in the family Theridiidae. It is found in Brazil.
