= Tomoxena flavomaculata =

Scientific classification
- Kingdom: Animalia
- Phylum: Arthropoda
- Subphylum: Chelicerata
- Class: Arachnida
- Order: Araneae
- Infraorder: Araneomorphae
- Family: Theridiidae
- Genus: Tomoxena
- Species: T. flavomaculata

Binomial name
- Tomoxena flavomaculata Simon, 1895

Species of spider

Tomoxena flavomaculata is a species of comb-footed spider in the family Theridiidae. It is found in Sumatra.
