= Wirada araucaria =

Scientific classification
- Domain: Eukaryota
- Kingdom: Animalia
- Phylum: Arthropoda
- Subphylum: Chelicerata
- Class: Arachnida
- Order: Araneae
- Infraorder: Araneomorphae
- Family: Theridiidae
- Genus: Wirada
- Species: W. araucaria

Binomial name
- Wirada araucaria Lise, Silva & Bertoncello, 2009

Species of spider

Wirada araucaria is a species of comb-footed spider in the family Theridiidae. It is found in Brazil.
