= Hadrotarsus babirussa =

Scientific classification
- Kingdom: Animalia
- Phylum: Arthropoda
- Subphylum: Chelicerata
- Class: Arachnida
- Order: Araneae
- Infraorder: Araneomorphae
- Family: Theridiidae
- Genus: Hadrotarsus
- Species: H. babirussa

Binomial name
- Hadrotarsus babirussa Thorell, 1881

Species of spider

Hadrotarsus babirussa is a species of comb-footed spider in the family Theridiidae. It is found in New Guinea.
