= Ballista spider =

Scientific classification
- Kingdom: Animalia
- Phylum: Arthropoda
- Subphylum: Chelicerata
- Class: Arachnida
- Order: Araneae
- Infraorder: Araneomorphae
- Family: Theridiidae
- Genus: Propostira
- Species: P. sp.

Binomial name
- Propostira sp.

Species of spider

The ballista spider is the common name for a recently discovered unnamed species of spider of the genus Propostira. Discovered in 2026 by a team of researchers from Macquarie University led by Ajay Narendra, it was identified in the rainforests of northern Australia. It hunts by weaving a catapult-like snare that launches its prey, the highly aggressive green tree ant (Oecophylla smaragdina), into a primary web – hence its nickname after the ballista, an ancient projectile weapon.

== Hunting behaviour ==
During the day, the spider resides on the underside of leaves on trees occupied by the ant. About 30 minutes after sunset, it starts exploring for a suitable place to construct a snare. After finding a suitable site, it constructs the snare with a fan-shaped network of 15–60 tension lines connected to a small, wrapped cone of silk. The cone attracts the green tree ant, which bites down on the cone, triggering the snare. The ant is flung towards the main web, propelled to distances of over 28 cm and velocities of over 4 m/s. Unusually for a spiderweb, the snare appears specifically designed to hunt the green tree ant. Narendra's team argued that the snare was therefore specifically evolved due to the prey specialisation of the ballista spider. Researchers suspect that spider scatters pheromones on its web that attract green tree ants to it.
