= Ohlertidion lundbecki =

Scientific classification
- Domain: Eukaryota
- Kingdom: Animalia
- Phylum: Arthropoda
- Subphylum: Chelicerata
- Class: Arachnida
- Order: Araneae
- Infraorder: Araneomorphae
- Family: Theridiidae
- Genus: Ohlertidion
- Species: O. lundbecki

Binomial name
- Ohlertidion lundbecki (Sørensen, 1898)

Species of spider

Ohlertidion lundbecki is a species of comb-footed spider in the family Theridiidae. It is found in Greenland.
