= Selkirkiella carelmapuensis =

Scientific classification
- Kingdom: Animalia
- Phylum: Arthropoda
- Subphylum: Chelicerata
- Class: Arachnida
- Order: Araneae
- Infraorder: Araneomorphae
- Family: Theridiidae
- Genus: Selkirkiella
- Species: S. carelmapuensis

Binomial name
- Selkirkiella carelmapuensis (Levi, 1963)

Species of spider

Selkirkiella carelmapuensis is a species of comb-footed spider in the family Theridiidae. It is found in Chile.
