= Hadrotarsus yamius =

Scientific classification
- Domain: Eukaryota
- Kingdom: Animalia
- Phylum: Arthropoda
- Subphylum: Chelicerata
- Class: Arachnida
- Order: Araneae
- Infraorder: Araneomorphae
- Family: Theridiidae
- Genus: Hadrotarsus
- Species: H. yamius

Binomial name
- Hadrotarsus yamius Wang, 1955

Species of spider

Hadrotarsus yamius is a species of comb-footed spider in the family Theridiidae. It is found in Taiwan.
