= Macaridion =

Scientific classification
- Kingdom: Animalia
- Phylum: Arthropoda
- Subphylum: Chelicerata
- Class: Arachnida
- Order: Araneae
- Infraorder: Araneomorphae
- Family: Theridiidae
- Genus: Macaridion; Wunderlich, 1992
- Species: M. barreti

Binomial name
- Macaridion barreti (Kulczyński, 1899)

Genus of spiders

Macaridion is a monotypic genus of European comb-footed spiders containing the single species, Macaridion barreti. The genus was first described by J. Wunderlich in 1992, and it is found in Portugal and Spain. The sole species was first described under the name Theridion barreti, but it was elevated to its own genus in 1992.
