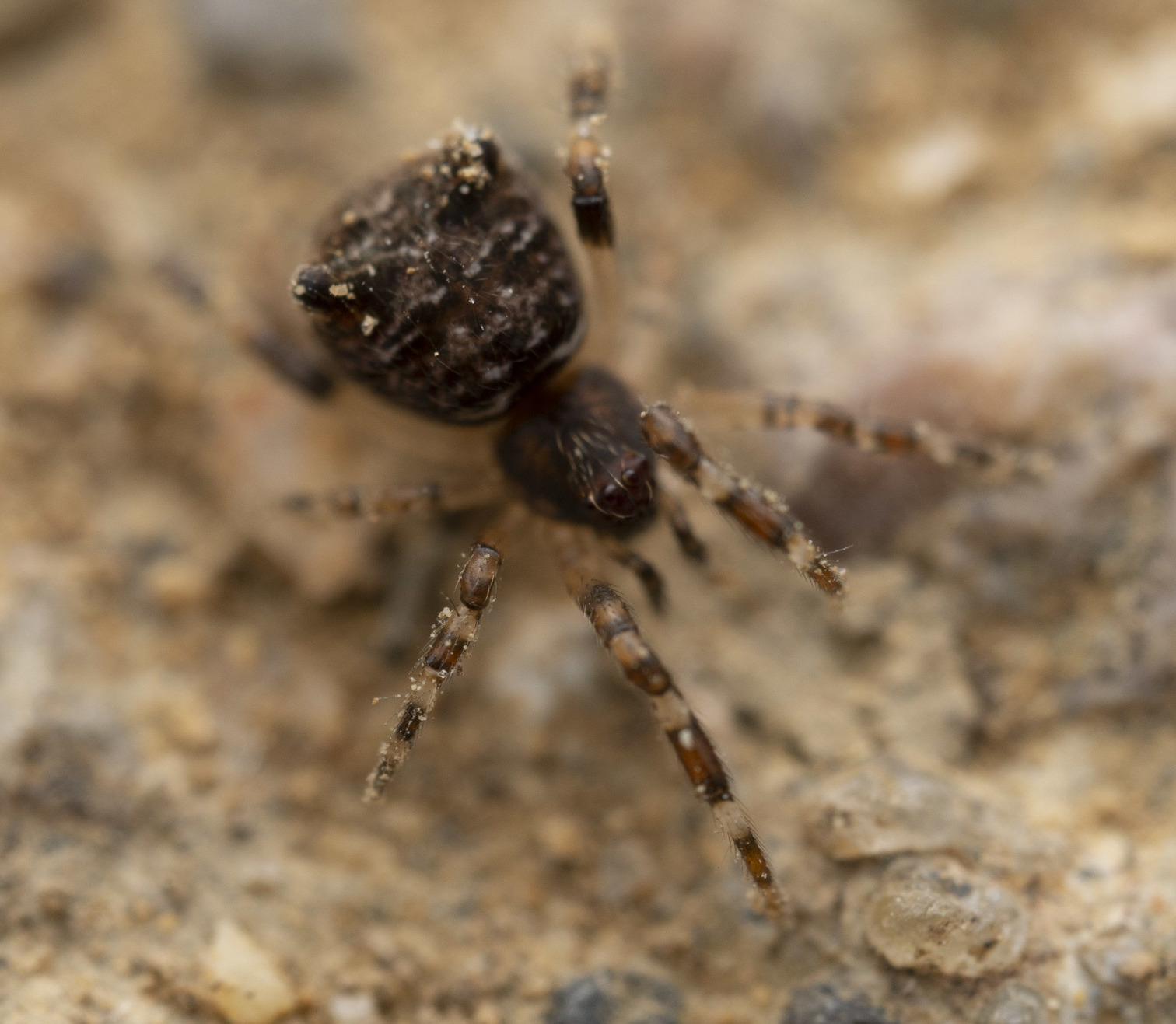
- female A. nubilus
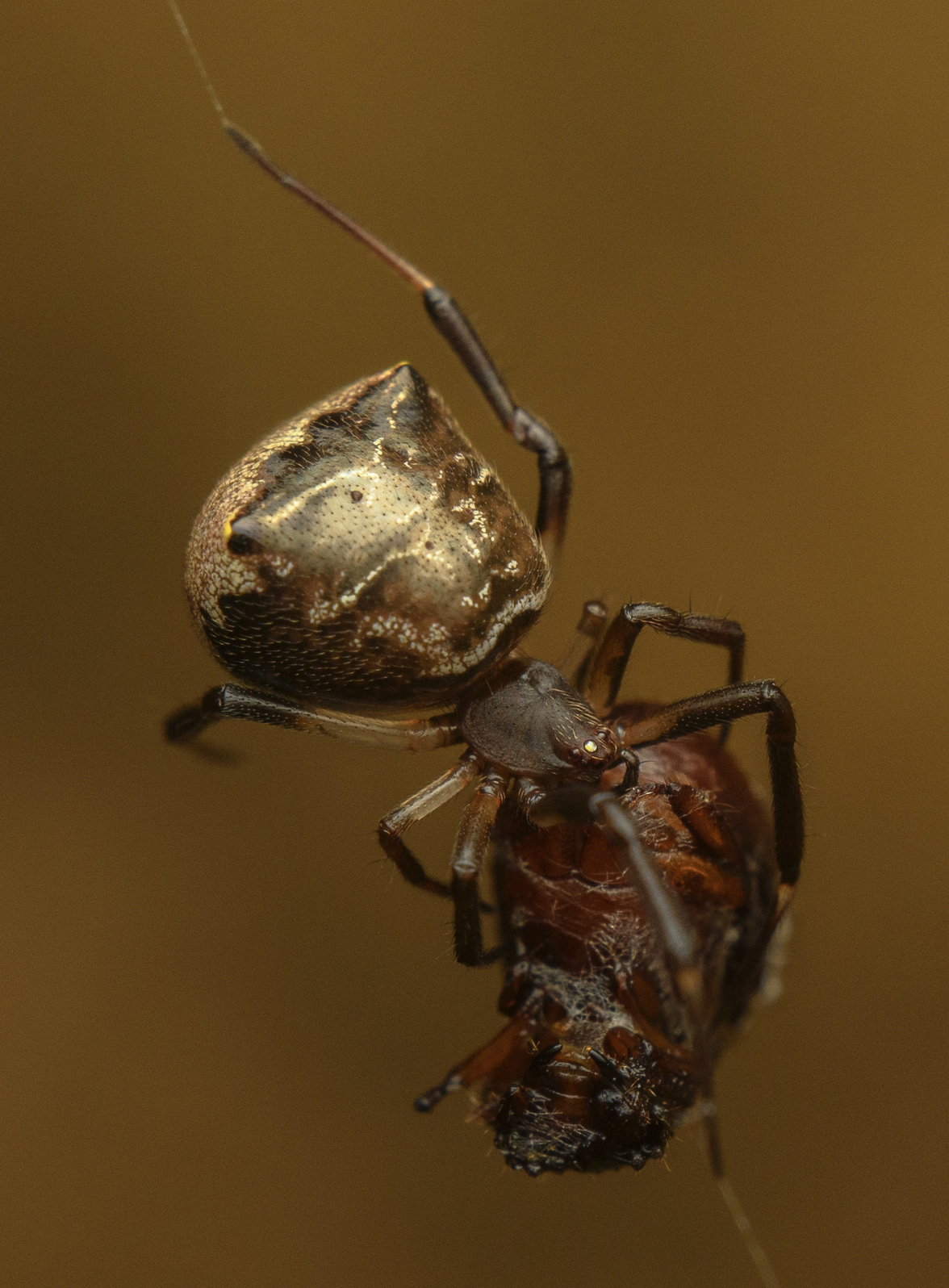
- A. nubilus with prey

Scientific classification
- Kingdom: Animalia
- Phylum: Arthropoda
- Subphylum: Chelicerata
- Class: Arachnida
- Order: Araneae
- Infraorder: Araneomorphae
- Family: Theridiidae
- Genus: Asiopisinus; Hu, Wei, Liu & Xu, 2025

Species
- 8, see text

= Asiopisinus =

Genus of spiders

Asiopisinus is a genus of spiders in the family Theridiidae.

== Distribution ==
Most Asiopisinus are endemic to China, with some found in Japan, Korea and Taiwan.

== Etymology ==
The genus name is a combination of Asia and the related genus Episinus.

== Species ==
As of January 2026, this genus includes eight species:

- Asiopisinus anfu (Liang, Liu, Yin & Yu, 2025) – China
- Asiopisinus baoshanensis (Liu, Irfan & Peng, 2019) – China
- Asiopisinus cheni Hu, Wei, Liu & Xu, 2025 – China
- Asiopisinus implicatus (Liang, Liu, Yin & Yu, 2025) – China
- Asiopisinus nubilus (Yaginuma, 1960) – Japan, Korea, China, Taiwan
- Asiopisinus ornithorrhynchus (F. J. Liu, Agnarsson, J. Liu & Zhu, 2022) – China
- Asiopisinus pseudonubilus (Liang, Liu, Yin & Yu, 2025) – China
- Asiopisinus yoshidai (Okuma, 1994) – Taiwan
