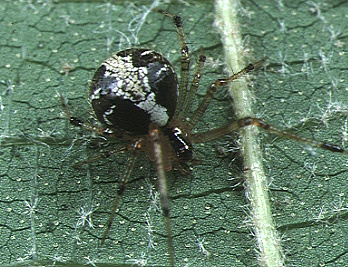

Scientific classification
- Kingdom: Animalia
- Phylum: Arthropoda
- Subphylum: Chelicerata
- Class: Arachnida
- Order: Araneae
- Infraorder: Araneomorphae
- Family: Theridiidae
- Genus: Nipponidion; Yoshida, 2001

Type species
- N. okinawense Yoshida, 2001

Species
- N. okinawense Yoshida, 2001 – Japan (Okinawa); N. yaeyamense (Yoshida, 1993) – Japan

= Nipponidion =

Genus of spiders

Nipponidion is a genus of Japanese comb-footed spiders that was first described by H. Yoshida in 2001. As of May 2020 it contains two species, found in Japan: N. okinawense and N. yaeyamense.
