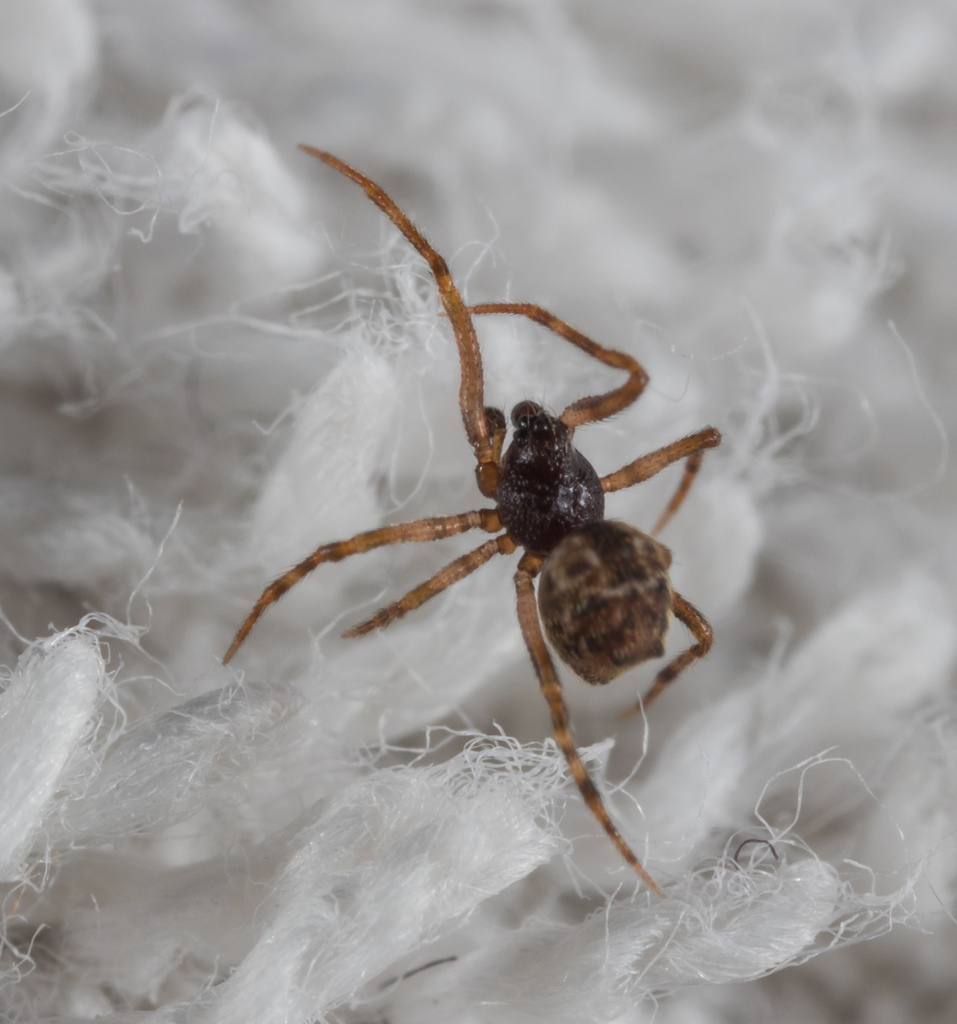
- male from Hong Kong

Scientific classification
- Kingdom: Animalia
- Phylum: Arthropoda
- Subphylum: Chelicerata
- Class: Arachnida
- Order: Araneae
- Infraorder: Araneomorphae
- Family: Theridiidae
- Genus: Dipoenura; Simon, 1909

Type species
- D. fimbriata Simon, 1909

Species
- 5, see text

Synonyms
- Trichursa Simon, 1908

= Dipoenura =

Genus of spiders

Dipoenura is a genus of comb-footed spiders that was first described by Eugène Louis Simon in 1909.

== Species ==
As of May 2020 it contains five species, found in Asia and Sierra Leone:

- Dipoenura aplustra Zhu & Zhang, 1997 – China
- Dipoenura bukolana Barrion, Barrion-Dupo & Heong, 2013 – China
- Dipoenura cyclosoides (Simon, 1895) – Sierra Leone, China, Laos
- Dipoenura fimbriata Simon, 1909 (type) – India, China, Vietnam, Indonesia (Krakatau), Korea, Japan
- Dipoenura quadrifida Simon, 1909 – Vietnam
