= Knoflachia =

Scientific classification
- Kingdom: Animalia
- Phylum: Arthropoda
- Subphylum: Chelicerata
- Class: Arachnida
- Order: Araneae
- Infraorder: Araneomorphae
- Family: Theridiidae
- Genus: Knoflachia; Marusik & Eskov, 2024
- Species: K. kurilensis

Binomial name
- Knoflachia kurilensis Marusik & Eskov, 2024

Monotypic genus of spiders

Knoflachia is a monotypic genus containing only one species Knoflachia kurilensis.
