= Hadrotarsus =

Scientific classification
- Kingdom: Animalia
- Phylum: Arthropoda
- Subphylum: Chelicerata
- Class: Arachnida
- Order: Araneae
- Infraorder: Araneomorphae
- Family: Theridiidae
- Genus: Hadrotarsus; Thorell, 1881

Type species
- H. babirussa Thorell, 1881

Species
- 5, see text

Genus of spiders

Hadrotarsus is a genus of spiders in the family Theridiidae (comb-footed spiders) that was first described by Tamerlan Thorell in 1881.

== Species ==
As of May 2020 it contains five species, found in Australia, Papua New Guinea, Taiwan, and Belgium:

- Hadrotarsus babirussa Thorell, 1881 (type) – New Guinea
- Hadrotarsus fulvus Hickman, 1943 – Australia (Tasmania)
- Hadrotarsus ornatus Hickman, 1943 – Australia (Tasmania). Introduced to Belgium
- Hadrotarsus setosus Hickman, 1943 – Australia (Tasmania)
- Hadrotarsus yamius Wang, 1955 – Taiwan
