= Anttheridion =

Scientific classification
- Kingdom: Animalia
- Phylum: Arthropoda
- Subphylum: Chelicerata
- Class: Arachnida
- Order: Araneae
- Infraorder: Araneomorphae
- Family: Theridiidae
- Genus: Anttheridion; Jocqué & Vanuytven, 2025

Type species
- A. demerodei Jocqué & Vanuytven, 2025

Species
- 2, see text

Genus of spiders

Anttheridion is a genus of spiders in the family Theridiidae.

== Distribution ==
Anttheridion has a disjunct distribution, with one species found in the DR Congo, and the other in Borneo.

== Etymology ==
The genus name is a combination of ant (for the ant-like appearance) and Theridion. The species honors anthropologist Emmanuel de Merode.

== Species ==
As of January 2026, this genus includes two species:

- Anttheridion demerodei Jocqué & Vanuytven, 2025 – DR Congo
- Anttheridion perreticulatum Jocqué & Vanuytven, 2025 – Malaysia (Borneo)
