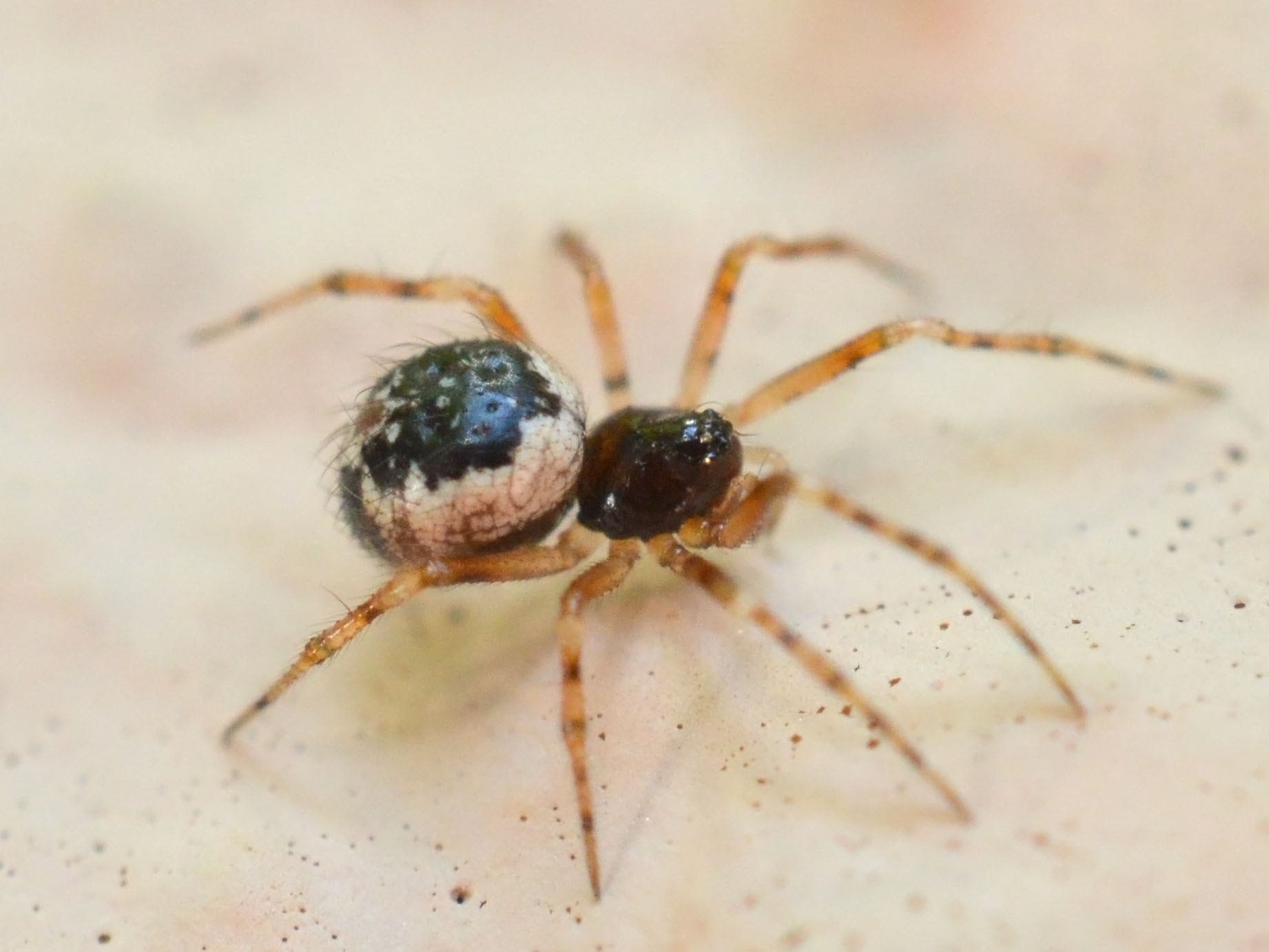
- S. blackwalli from Bulgaria

Scientific classification
- Kingdom: Animalia
- Phylum: Arthropoda
- Subphylum: Chelicerata
- Class: Arachnida
- Order: Araneae
- Infraorder: Araneomorphae
- Family: Theridiidae
- Genus: Sardinidion; Wunderlich, 1995
- Species: S. blackwalli

Binomial name
- Sardinidion blackwalli (O. Pickard-Cambridge, 1871)

= Sardinidion =

Monotypic genus of spiders

Sardinidion is a monotypic genus of comb-footed spiders containing the single species, Sardinidion blackwalli. It was first described by J. Wunderlich in 1995, and is found in Africa and Europe.
