= Propostira =

Scientific classification
- Kingdom: Animalia
- Phylum: Arthropoda
- Subphylum: Chelicerata
- Class: Arachnida
- Order: Araneae
- Infraorder: Araneomorphae
- Family: Theridiidae
- Genus: Propostira; Simon, 1894

Type species
- P. quadrangulata Simon, 1894

Species
- P. quadrangulata Simon, 1894 – India, Sri Lanka; P. ranii Bhattacharya, 1935 – India; ballista spider Narendra, 2026 Australia

Genus of spiders

Propostira is a genus of Asian comb-footed spiders that was first described by Eugène Louis Simon in 1894. As of June 2026 it contains three species. Two are found in Sri Lanka and India: P. quadrangulata and P. ranii. A third was discovered in 2026 in the rainforest of the Cape York Peninsula. Yet to be officially named, it has been nicknamed the "ballista spider", in reference to the ballista weapon that could hurl stones.
