= Magnopholcomma =

Scientific classification
- Kingdom: Animalia
- Phylum: Arthropoda
- Subphylum: Chelicerata
- Class: Arachnida
- Order: Araneae
- Infraorder: Araneomorphae
- Family: Theridiidae
- Genus: Magnopholcomma; Wunderlich, 2008
- Species: M. globulus

Binomial name
- Magnopholcomma globulus Wunderlich, 2008

Genus of spiders

Magnopholcomma is a monotypic genus of comb-footed spiders containing the single species, Magnopholcomma globulus. It was first described by J. Wunderlich in 2008, and is found in Queensland.

Only the male has been described.
