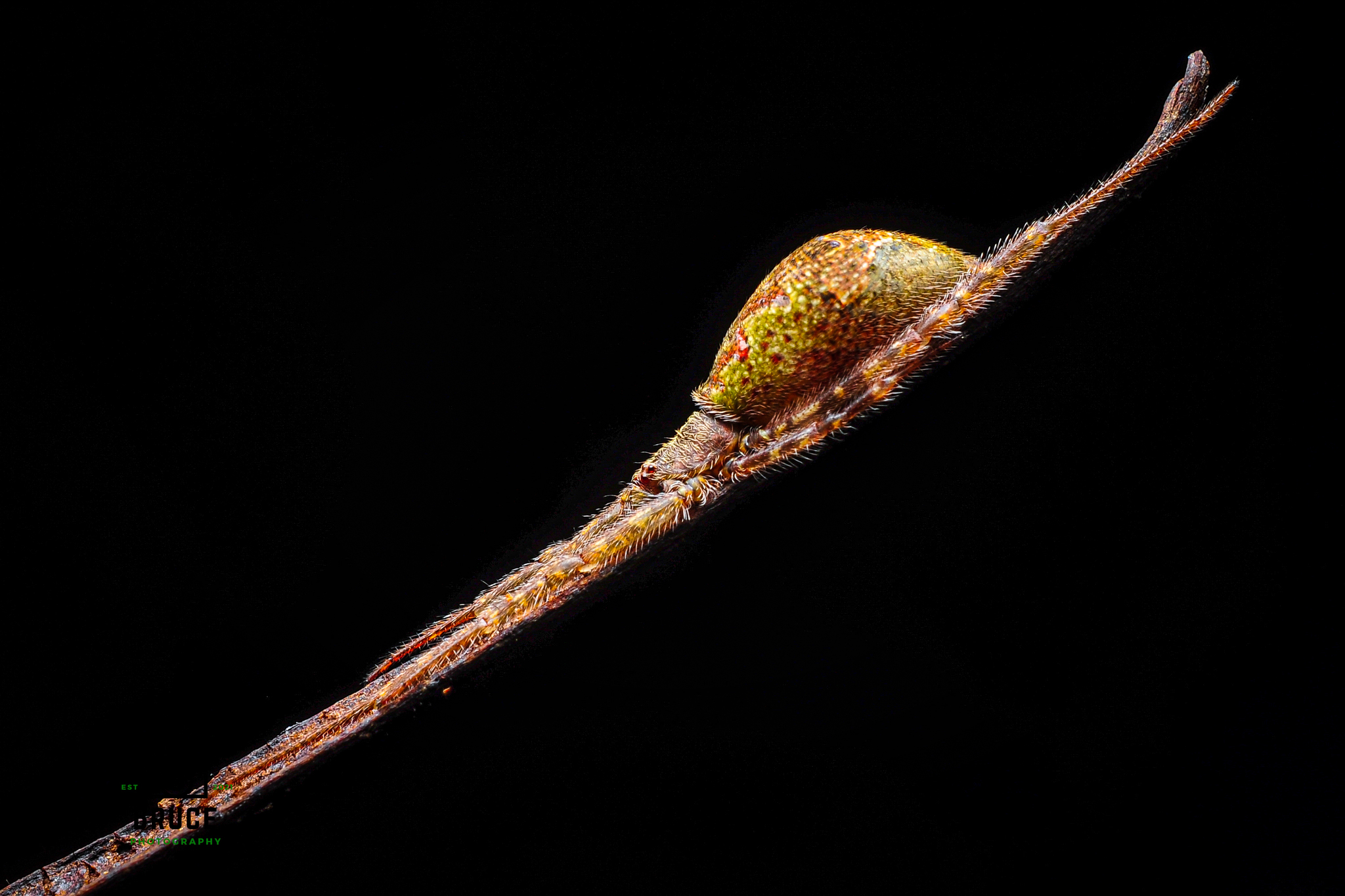

Scientific classification
- Kingdom: Animalia
- Phylum: Arthropoda
- Subphylum: Chelicerata
- Class: Arachnida
- Order: Araneae
- Infraorder: Araneomorphae
- Family: Theridiidae
- Genus: Brunepisinus; Yoshida & Koh, 2011
- Species: B. selirong

Binomial name
- Brunepisinus selirong Yoshida & Koh, 2011

= Brunepisinus =

Brunepisinus selirong

Genus of spiders

Brunepisinus is a monotypic genus of comb-footed spiders containing the single species, Brunepisinus selirong. It was first described by H. Yoshida & J. K. H. Koh in 2011, and is found on Borneo.
