= Trust solium =

Scientific classification
- Kingdom: Animalia
- Phylum: Arthropoda
- Subphylum: Chelicerata
- Class: Arachnida
- Order: Araneae
- Infraorder: Araneomorphae
- Family: Theridiidae
- Genus: Trust; Sherwood, Marusik, Wilkins, P. Ashmole & M. Ashmole, 2024
- Species: T. solium

Binomial name
- Trust solium (Benoit, 1977)

Species of spider

Trust is a monotypic genus of spiders in the family Theridiidae containing the single species, Trust solium.

== Distribution ==
Trust solium is endemic to St. Helena.

== Etymology ==
The genus name honors the Saint Helena National Trust.
