= Gushangzao =

Scientific classification
- Kingdom: Animalia
- Phylum: Arthropoda
- Subphylum: Chelicerata
- Class: Arachnida
- Order: Araneae
- Infraorder: Araneomorphae
- Family: Theridiidae
- Genus: Gushangzao; Lin & Li, 2024

Type species
- G. shiqian Lin & Li, 2024

Species
- 4, see text

Genus of spiders

Gushangzao is a genus of spiders in the family Theridiidae.

== Distribution ==
All species of Gushangzao are found in China, with G. goemon reaching into Japan.

== Etymology ==
The genus is named after 時遷; shíqiān, also known as 鼓上蚤; gǔshàngzǎo ("Flea on a Drum"), one of the 108 Heroes of Water Margin.

== Species ==
As of January 2026, this genus includes four species:

- Gushangzao andaoquan Lin & Li, 2024 – China (Hainan)
- Gushangzao goemon Lin & Li, 2024 – Japan (Ryukyu Islands), China
- Gushangzao pelorosus (Zhu, 1998) – China
- Gushangzao shiqian Lin & Li, 2024 – China
