= Jamaitidion =

Scientific classification
- Kingdom: Animalia
- Phylum: Arthropoda
- Subphylum: Chelicerata
- Class: Arachnida
- Order: Araneae
- Infraorder: Araneomorphae
- Family: Theridiidae
- Genus: Jamaitidion; Wunderlich, 1995
- Species: J. jamaicense

Binomial name
- Jamaitidion jamaicense (Levi, 1959)

Genus of spiders

Jamaitidion is a monotypic genus of comb-footed spiders containing the single species, Jamaitidion jamaicense. The genus was first described by J. Wunderlich in 1995, and is found on the Greater Antilles. The sole species of this genus was described by Herbert Walter Levi in 1959. It was originally placed in Theridion, but was moved to its own genus based on unique features of the epigynum.
