= Grancanaridion =

Scientific classification
- Kingdom: Animalia
- Phylum: Arthropoda
- Subphylum: Chelicerata
- Class: Arachnida
- Order: Araneae
- Infraorder: Araneomorphae
- Family: Theridiidae
- Genus: Grancanaridion; Wunderlich, 2011
- Species: G. grancanariense

Binomial name
- Grancanaridion grancanariense (Wunderlich, 1987)

Genus of spiders

Grancanaridion is a monotypic genus of comb-footed spiders containing the single species, Grancanaridion grancanariense. It was first described by J. Wunderlich in 2011, and is found on the Canary Islands.
