= Achaearyopa =

Scientific classification
- Kingdom: Animalia
- Phylum: Arthropoda
- Subphylum: Chelicerata
- Class: Arachnida
- Order: Araneae
- Infraorder: Araneomorphae
- Family: Theridiidae
- Genus: Achaearyopa; Barrion & Litsinger, 1995
- Species: A. pnaca

Binomial name
- Achaearyopa pnaca Barrion & Litsinger, 1995

Genus of spiders

Achaearyopa is a monotypic genus of Filipino comb-footed spiders containing the single species, Achaearyopa pnaca. It was first described by A. T. Barrion & J. A. Litsinger in 1995, and is found in the Philippines.
