= Nesopholcomma =

Scientific classification
- Kingdom: Animalia
- Phylum: Arthropoda
- Subphylum: Chelicerata
- Class: Arachnida
- Order: Araneae
- Infraorder: Araneomorphae
- Family: Theridiidae
- Genus: Nesopholcomma; Ono, 2010
- Species: N. izuense

Binomial name
- Nesopholcomma izuense Ono, 2010

Monotypic genus of spiders

Nesopholcomma is a monotypic genus of Asian comb-footed spiders containing the single species, Nesopholcomma izuense. It was first described by H. Ono in 2010, and has only been found in Japan.
