= Nojimaia =

Scientific classification
- Kingdom: Animalia
- Phylum: Arthropoda
- Subphylum: Chelicerata
- Class: Arachnida
- Order: Araneae
- Infraorder: Araneomorphae
- Family: Theridiidae
- Genus: Nojimaia; Yoshida, 2009
- Species: N. nipponica

Binomial name
- Nojimaia nipponica Yoshida, 2009

Monotypic genus of spiders

Nojimaia is a monotypic genus of East Asian comb-footed spiders containing the single species, Nojimaia nipponica. It was first described by H. Yoshida in 2009, and is found in Japan and China.
