= Helenidion =

Scientific classification
- Kingdom: Animalia
- Phylum: Arthropoda
- Subphylum: Chelicerata
- Class: Arachnida
- Order: Araneae
- Infraorder: Araneomorphae
- Family: Theridiidae
- Subfamily: Theridiinae
- Genus: Helenidion; Sherwood, Marusik, Fowler, Stevens & Joshua, 2024

Type species
- Theridion sciaphilum Benoit, 1977

Species
- 2, see text

Genus of spiders

Helenidion is a genus of spiders in the family Theridiidae.

== Distribution ==
Helenidion is endemic to St. Helena.

== Etymology ==
The genus name is a combination of "St. Helena" and related genus Theridion.

== Species ==
As of January 2026, this genus includes two species:

- Helenidion huberti (Benoit, 1977) – St. Helena
- Helenidion sciaphilum (Benoit, 1977) – St. Helena
