= Yoroa =

Scientific classification
- Kingdom: Animalia
- Phylum: Arthropoda
- Subphylum: Chelicerata
- Class: Arachnida
- Order: Araneae
- Infraorder: Araneomorphae
- Family: Theridiidae
- Genus: Yoroa; Baert, 1984

Type species
- Y. clypeoglandularis Baert, 1984

Species
- Y. clypeoglandularis Baert, 1984 – New Guinea; Y. taylori Harvey & Waldock, 2000 – Australia (Queensland)

Genus of spiders

Yoroa is a genus of South Pacific comb-footed spiders that was first described by L. Baert in 1984. As of June 2020 it contains two species, found in Australia and Papua New Guinea: Y. clypeoglandularis and Y. taylori.

The authors when describing a second species from northern Queensland – Yoroa taylori – also revised the descriptions of the genus and New Guinea species with specimens of the previously unknown females.
