= Glebych =

Scientific classification
- Kingdom: Animalia
- Phylum: Arthropoda
- Subphylum: Chelicerata
- Class: Arachnida
- Order: Araneae
- Infraorder: Araneomorphae
- Family: Theridiidae
- Genus: Glebych; Eskov & Marusik, 2021
- Species: G. minutissimus

Binomial name
- Glebych minutissimus Eskov & Marusik, 2021

Genus of spiders

Glebych is a monotypic genus of South American tangle-web spiders containing the single species, Glebych minutissimus. It was first described by K. Y. Eskov and Yuri M. Marusik in 2021, and it has only been found in Peru.
