= Physcoa (spider) =

Scientific classification
- Kingdom: Animalia
- Phylum: Arthropoda
- Subphylum: Chelicerata
- Class: Arachnida
- Order: Araneae
- Infraorder: Araneomorphae
- Family: Theridiidae
- Genus: Physcoa; Thorell, 1895

Type species
- P. scintillans Thorell, 1895

Species
- 7, see text

Genus of spiders

Physcoa is a genus of spiders in the family Theridiidae.

== Distribution ==
The genus Physcoa is restricted to Asia, with six species endemic to China and one species, Physcoa scintillans, distributed across India, Myanmar, China, Korea, Japan, and the Philippines.

== Species ==
As of January 2026, this genus includes seven species:

- Physcoa cyclocera (Zhu, 1998) – China
- Physcoa fanjingshan (Song, Zhang & Zhu, 2006) – China
- Physcoa oxycera (Zhu & Song, 1993) – China
- Physcoa scintillans (Thorell, 1895) – India, Myanmar, China, Korea, Japan, Philippines
- Physcoa trimaculata (Zhu, Zhang & Xu, 1991) – China, Taiwan, Thailand
- Physcoa trispinula (Zhu, 1998) – China
- Physcoa wenxianensis (Zhu, 1998) – China
