= Selkirkiella =

Scientific classification
- Kingdom: Animalia
- Phylum: Arthropoda
- Subphylum: Chelicerata
- Class: Arachnida
- Order: Araneae
- Infraorder: Araneomorphae
- Family: Theridiidae
- Genus: Selkirkiella; Berland, 1924

Type species
- S. alboguttata Berland, 1924

Species
- 8, see text

Genus of spiders

Selkirkiella is a genus of South American comb-footed spiders that was first described by Lucien Berland in 1924. Originally placed with the Araneidae, it was transferred to the comb-footed spiders in 1972.

== Species ==
As of June 2020 it contains eight species, found in Chile, Argentina, and on the Falkland Islands:

- Selkirkiella alboguttata Berland, 1924 (type) – Chile (Juan Fernandez Is.)
- Selkirkiella carelmapuensis (Levi, 1963) – Chile
- Selkirkiella luisi (Levi, 1967) – Chile
- Selkirkiella magallanes (Levi, 1963) – Chile
- Selkirkiella michaelseni (Simon, 1902) – Chile
- Selkirkiella purpurea (Nicolet, 1849) – Chile
- Selkirkiella ventrosa (Nicolet, 1849) – Chile, Argentina, Falkland Is.
- Selkirkiella wellingtoni (Levi, 1967) – Chile

In synonymy:

- S. portazuelo (Levi, 1967) = Selkirkiella alboguttata Berland, 1924
- S. recurvata (Tullgren, 1901) = Selkirkiella ventrosa (Nicolet, 1849)
- S. transversa (Nicolet, 1849) = Selkirkiella purpurea (Nicolet, 1849)
- S. triangulifer (Simon, 1902) = Selkirkiella ventrosa (Nicolet, 1849)
