= Vigdisia =

Scientific classification
- Kingdom: Animalia
- Phylum: Arthropoda
- Subphylum: Chelicerata
- Class: Arachnida
- Order: Araneae
- Infraorder: Araneomorphae
- Family: Theridiidae
- Genus: Vigdisia; Agnarsson, Kuntner, Yu & Gregorič, 2025
- Species: V. praesidens

Binomial name
- Vigdisia praesidens Agnarsson, Kuntner, Yu & Gregorič, 2025

Species of spider

Vigdisia is a monotypic genus of spiders in the family Theridiidae containing the single species, Vigdisia praesidens.

== Distribution ==
Vigdisia praesidens is endemic to Madagascar.

== Etymology ==
The genus and species name honor former Icelandic president Vigdís Finnbogadóttir, the first democratically elected female president in the world. According to the original description, »Vigdís shares the spider´s elegance and wits«.
