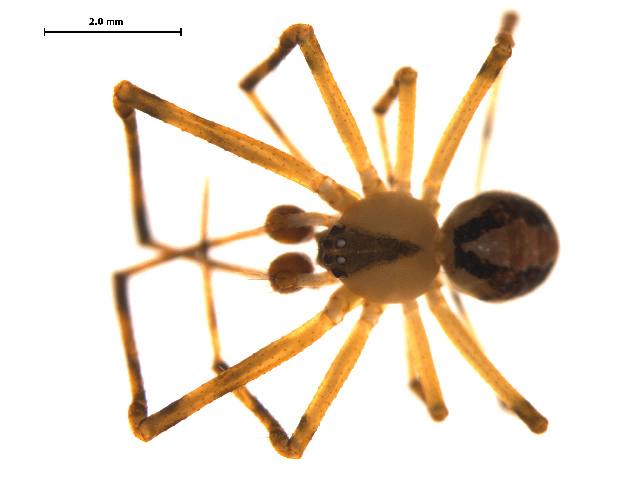
- C. montanum, adult male
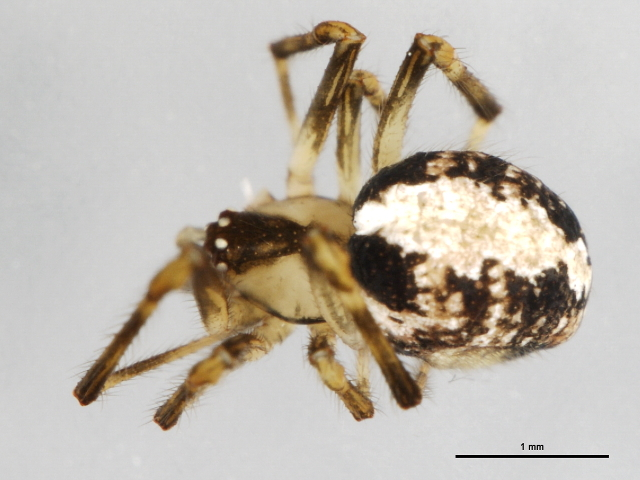
- C. montanum, adult female

Conservation status
- Secure (NatureServe)

Scientific classification
- Kingdom: Animalia
- Phylum: Arthropoda
- Subphylum: Chelicerata
- Class: Arachnida
- Order: Araneae
- Infraorder: Araneomorphae
- Family: Theridiidae
- Genus: Canalidion; Wunderlich, 2008
- Species: C. montanum

Binomial name
- Canalidion montanum (Emerton, 1882)

= Canalidion =

Genus of spiders

Canalidion is a monotypic genus of tangle-web spiders containing the single species, Canalidion montanum. The species was first described by James Emerton in 1882 under the name Theridion montanum. J. Wunderlich moved it to its own genus in 2018, because it had more teeth on the anterior margin of the cheliceral furrow, a basal depression of the cymbium, and an embolus positioned dorsally. It has a holarctic distribution.
