= Troglotheridion =

Scientific classification
- Kingdom: Animalia
- Phylum: Arthropoda
- Subphylum: Chelicerata
- Class: Arachnida
- Order: Araneae
- Infraorder: Araneomorphae
- Family: Theridiidae
- Genus: Troglotheridion; Hu & Liu, 2025

Type species
- T. lamellatum Hu & Liu, 2025

Species
- 2, see text

Genus of spiders

Troglotheridion is a genus of spiders in the family Theridiidae.

== Distribution ==
Troglotheridion endemic to China.

== Etymology ==
The genus name is a combination of "troglo-" (cave) and the related genus Theridion.

== Species ==
As of January 2026, this genus includes two species:

- Troglotheridion lamellatum Hu & Liu, 2025 – China
- Troglotheridion sangzhiense (Zhu, 1998) – China
