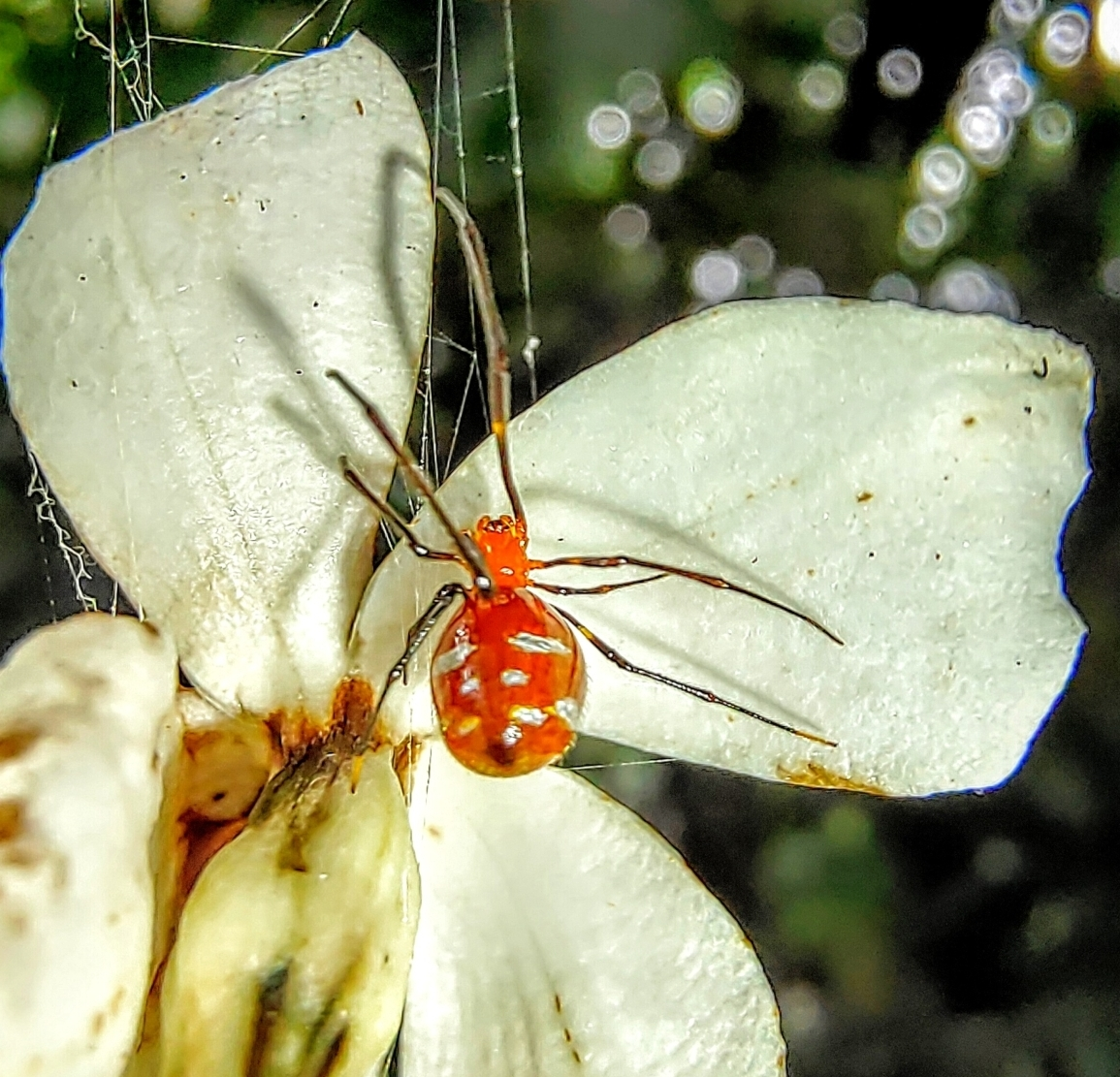
- F. flavescens in Singapore
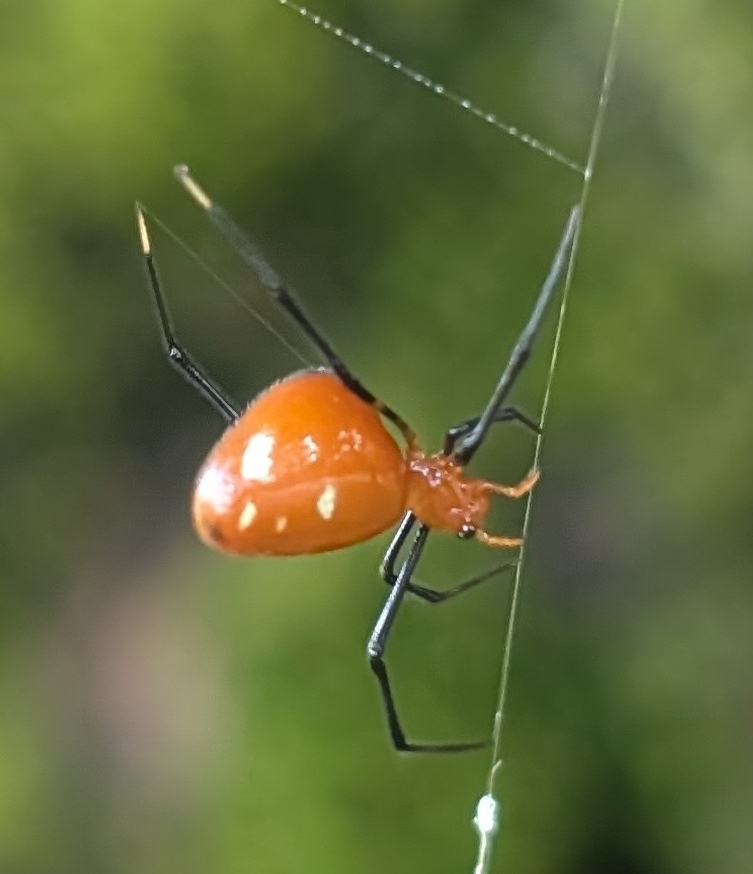
- F. miniacea in Guam

Scientific classification
- Kingdom: Animalia
- Phylum: Arthropoda
- Subphylum: Chelicerata
- Class: Arachnida
- Order: Araneae
- Infraorder: Araneomorphae
- Family: Theridiidae
- Genus: Famakytta; Pett & Agnarsson, 2025

Type species
- F. analamazaotra Pett & Agnarsson, 2025

Species
- 4, see text

= Famakytta =

Genus of spiders

Famakytta is a genus of spiders in the family Theridiidae.

== Distribution ==
Famakytta is distributed across tropical and subtropical Asia and the Indo-Pacific region. The genus is also represented in Madagascar.

== Etymology ==
The genus name is a combination of Malagasy famaky "hammer" and "TTA" (theridiid tegular apophysis). F. analamazaotra is named after the paratype locality, Analamazaotra.

== Species ==
As of January 2026, this genus includes four species:

- Famakytta analamazaotra Agnarsson & Pett, 2025 – Madagascar
- Famakytta fissifrontella (Saaristo, 1978) – Seychelles
- Famakytta flavescens (O. Pickard-Cambridge, 1880) – India, Sri Lanka to Japan, New Guinea
- Famakytta miniacea (Doleschall, 1857) – India, Korea, Japan to Australia
