= Helvidia =

Scientific classification
- Kingdom: Animalia
- Phylum: Arthropoda
- Subphylum: Chelicerata
- Class: Arachnida
- Order: Araneae
- Infraorder: Araneomorphae
- Family: Theridiidae
- Genus: Helvidia; Thorell, 1890
- Species: H. scabricula

Binomial name
- Helvidia scabricula Thorell, 1890

Genus of spiders

Helvidia is a monotypic genus of Sumatran comb-footed spiders containing the single species, Helvidia scabricula. It was first described by Tamerlan Thorell in 1890, and is found on Sumatra. Only males have ever been recorded.
