= Audifia =

Scientific classification
- Kingdom: Animalia
- Phylum: Arthropoda
- Subphylum: Chelicerata
- Class: Arachnida
- Order: Araneae
- Infraorder: Araneomorphae
- Family: Theridiidae
- Genus: Audifia; Keyserling, 1884

Type species
- A. laevithorax Keyserling, 1884

Species
- A. duodecimpunctata Simon, 1907– Guinea-Bissau, Congo; A. laevithorax Keyserling, 1884 – Brazil; A. semigranosa Simon, 1895 – Brazil

Genus of spiders

Audifia is a genus of comb-footed spiders that was first described by Eugen von Keyserling in 1884. As of May 2020 it contains three species, found in Africa and Brazil: A. duodecimpunctata, A. laevithorax, and A. semigranosa.
