= Allothymoites =

Scientific classification
- Kingdom: Animalia
- Phylum: Arthropoda
- Subphylum: Chelicerata
- Class: Arachnida
- Order: Araneae
- Infraorder: Araneomorphae
- Family: Theridiidae
- Genus: Allothymoites; Ono, 2007

Type species
- A. kumadai Ono, 2007

Species
- A. kumadai Ono, 2007 – China, Japan; A. repandus Gao & Li, 2014 – China; A. sculptilis Gao & Li, 2014 – China

Genus of spiders

Allothymoites is a genus of East Asian comb-footed spiders that was first described by H. Ono in 2007. As of May 2020 it contains three species, found in Japan and China: A. kumadai, A. repandus, and A. sculptilis.
