= Zercidium =

Scientific classification
- Kingdom: Animalia
- Phylum: Arthropoda
- Subphylum: Chelicerata
- Class: Arachnida
- Order: Araneae
- Infraorder: Araneomorphae
- Family: Theridiidae
- Genus: Zercidium; Benoit, 1977
- Species: Z. helenense

Binomial name
- Zercidium helenense Benoit, 1977

Monotypic genus of spiders

Zercidium is a monotypic genus of Atlantic comb-footed spiders containing the single species, Zercidium helenense. It was first described by P. L. G. Benoit in 1977, and is found on Saint Helena.
