= Pycnoepisinus =

Scientific classification
- Kingdom: Animalia
- Phylum: Arthropoda
- Subphylum: Chelicerata
- Class: Arachnida
- Order: Araneae
- Infraorder: Araneomorphae
- Family: Theridiidae
- Genus: Pycnoepisinus; Wunderlich, 2008
- Species: P. kilimandjaroensis

Binomial name
- Pycnoepisinus kilimandjaroensis Wunderlich, 2008

Monotypic genus of spiders

Pycnoepisinus is a monotypic genus of Kenyan comb-footed spiders containing the single species, Pycnoepisinus kilimandjaroensis. It was first described by J. Wunderlich in 2008, and is found in Kenya.
