= Cyllognatha =

Scientific classification
- Kingdom: Animalia
- Phylum: Arthropoda
- Subphylum: Chelicerata
- Class: Arachnida
- Order: Araneae
- Infraorder: Araneomorphae
- Family: Theridiidae
- Genus: Cyllognatha; L. Koch, 1872

Type species
- C. subtilis L. Koch, 1872

Species
- 4, see text

Genus of spiders

Cyllognatha is a genus of comb-footed spiders that was first described by Ludwig Carl Christian Koch in 1872.

== Species ==
As of May 2020 it contains four species, found in Australia, Samoa, and India:

- Cyllognatha affinis Berland, 1929 – Samoa
- Cyllognatha gracilis Marples, 1955 – Samoa
- Cyllognatha subtilis L. Koch, 1872 (type) – Australia (Lord Howe Is.), Samoa
- Cyllognatha surajbe Patel & Patel, 1972 – India
