= Okumaella =

Scientific classification
- Kingdom: Animalia
- Phylum: Arthropoda
- Subphylum: Chelicerata
- Class: Arachnida
- Order: Araneae
- Infraorder: Araneomorphae
- Family: Theridiidae
- Genus: Okumaella; Yoshida, 2009
- Species: O. okumae

Binomial name
- Okumaella okumae (Yoshida, 1988)

Monotypic genus of spiders

Okumaella is a monotypic genus of East Asian comb-footed spiders containing the single species, Okumaella okumae. It was first described by H. Yoshida in 2009, and is found in Japan. This genus is named in honour of the Japanese arachnologist Chiyoko Okuma.
