= Dipoenata =

Scientific classification
- Kingdom: Animalia
- Phylum: Arthropoda
- Subphylum: Chelicerata
- Class: Arachnida
- Order: Araneae
- Infraorder: Araneomorphae
- Family: Theridiidae
- Genus: Dipoenata; Wunderlich, 1988

Species
- 5, see text

Genus of spiders

Dipoenata is a genus of comb-footed spiders that was first described by J. Wunderlich in 1988.

== Species ==
As of May 2020 it contains five species, found in Europe, Brazil, Venezuela, Panama, and on Hispaniola:

- Dipoenata balboae (Chickering, 1943) – Panama, Venezuela
- Dipoenata cana Kritscher, 1996 – Malta
- Dipoenata conica (Chickering, 1943) – Panama, Brazil
- Dipoenata longitarsis (Denis, 1962) – Madeira
- Dipoenata morosa (Bryant, 1948) – Hispaniola to Brazil

Formerly included:

- D. canariensis (Wunderlich, 1987) (Transferred to Lasaeola)
- D. flavitarsis Wunderlich, 1992 (Transferred to Lasaeola)
- D. sicki (Levi, 1963) (Transferred to Dipoena)

In synonymy:

- D. cylindrica = Dipoenata conica (Chickering, 1943)
