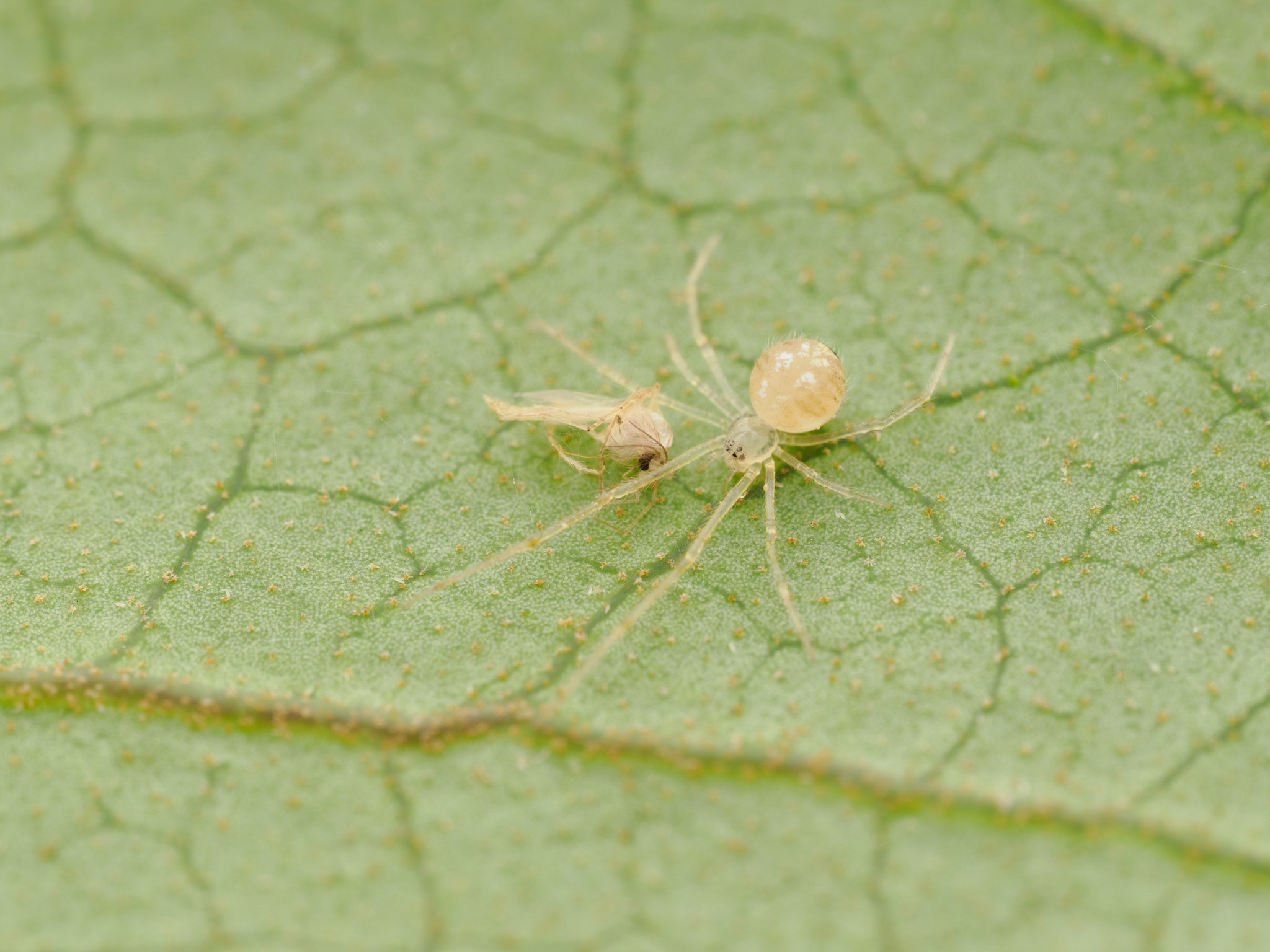
- Megama bimaculata

Scientific classification
- Kingdom: Animalia
- Phylum: Arthropoda
- Subphylum: Chelicerata
- Class: Arachnida
- Order: Araneae
- Infraorder: Araneomorphae
- Family: Theridiidae
- Genus: Megama; Hu, Zhong, Liu & Li, 2026

Type species
- M. decimaculata Hu, Zhong, Liu & Li, 2026

= Megama (spider) =

Genus of spiders

Megama is a genus of spiders in the family Theridiidae.

== Distribution ==
Species of the genus Megama are endemic to East Asia, with both species occurring in China and one species also reaching Japan.

== Species ==
As of August 2026, this genus includes two species:

- Megama bimaculata (Yoshida, 1998) – China, Japan
- Megama decimaculata Hu, Zhong, Liu & Li, 2026 – China
