= Wirada =

- female W. punctata

Scientific classification
- Kingdom: Animalia
- Phylum: Arthropoda
- Subphylum: Chelicerata
- Class: Arachnida
- Order: Araneae
- Infraorder: Araneomorphae
- Family: Theridiidae
- Genus: Wirada; Keyserling, 1886

Type species
- W. punctata Keyserling, 1886

Species
- 6, see text

Genus of spiders

Wirada is a genus of comb-footed spiders (family Theridiidae) that was first described by Eugen von Keyserling in 1886.

W. tovarensis is 1 millimetre (0.039 in) long. W. punctata males have a body length of 1.4 millimetres (0.055 in), while females have a body length of 1.5 millimetres (0.059 in).

== Species ==
As of June 2020 it contains six species, found in South America and Mexico:

- Wirada araucaria Lise, Silva & Bertoncello, 2009 – Brazil
- Wirada mexicana Campuzano & Ibarra-Núñez, 2018 – Mexico
- Wirada punctata Keyserling, 1886 (type) – Venezuela, Ecuador, Peru
- Wirada sigillata Lise, Silva & Bertoncello, 2009 – Brazil, Argentina
- Wirada tijuca Levi, 1967 – Brazil
- Wirada tovarensis Simon, 1895 – Venezuela

In synonymy:

- W. rugithorax Simon, 1895 = Wirada punctata Keyserling, 1886
