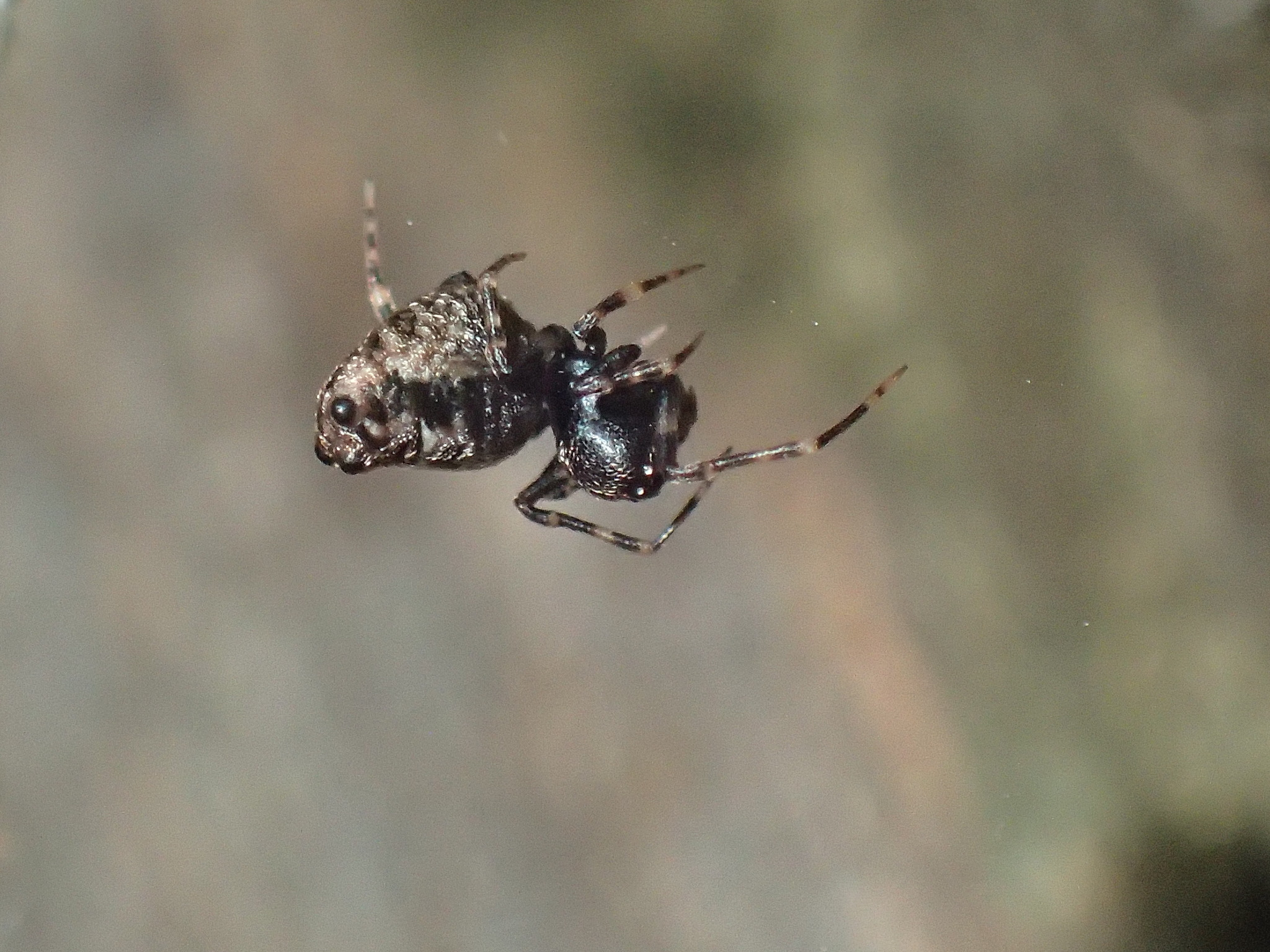

Scientific classification
- Kingdom: Animalia
- Phylum: Arthropoda
- Subphylum: Chelicerata
- Class: Arachnida
- Order: Araneae
- Infraorder: Araneomorphae
- Family: Theridiidae
- Genus: Chorizopella; Lawrence, 1947
- Species: C. tragardhi

Binomial name
- Chorizopella tragardhi Lawrence, 1947

Synonyms
- Choriozopella trägårdhi Lawrence, 1947

= Chorizopella =

Choriozopella Comb-Foot Spider

Genus of spiders

Chorizopella is a monotypic genus of South African comb-footed spiders containing the single species, Chorizopella tragardhi. It is endemic to South Africa and is commonly known as the Choriozopella comb-foot spider.

== Distribution ==
Chorizopella tragardhi is found in South Africa, where it is known from the provinces Eastern Cape, Gauteng, KwaZulu-Natal, Limpopo, Mpumalanga, North West, and Western Cape.

== Habitat and ecology ==
Specimens have been sampled mainly from pitfall traps. The behaviour of this genus is possibly the same as the cosmopolitan genus Dipoena. This species is associated with ants. It was sampled from the Forest, Indian Ocean Coastal Belt, and Savanna biomes at altitudes ranging from 4 to 1451 m.

== Conservation ==
Chorizopella tragardhi is listed as Least Concern by the South African National Biodiversity Institute. Although the species is presently known only from one sex, it has a wide geographical range. There are no significant threats to this species. It is sampled from more than ten protected areas.

== Taxonomy ==
Chorizopella tragardhi was described by Lawrence in 1947 from Umfolosi Drift in KwaZulu-Natal. The species is known only from the female.
