= Paratheridula =

Scientific classification
- Kingdom: Animalia
- Phylum: Arthropoda
- Subphylum: Chelicerata
- Class: Arachnida
- Order: Araneae
- Infraorder: Araneomorphae
- Family: Theridiidae
- Genus: Paratheridula; Levi, 1957
- Species: P. perniciosa

Binomial name
- Paratheridula perniciosa (Keyserling, 1886)

Monotypic genus of spiders

Paratheridula is a monotypic genus of comb-footed spiders containing the single species, Paratheridula perniciosa. The sole species was first described in 1886 under the name Theridion perniciosum. The genus was first described by Herbert Walter Levi in 1957, though it has been described under several different names, including Mysmena 4-maculata, Theridion quadrimaculatum, and Theridion arcadicum,

It has been found from Florida to southern Chile, with a possible pantropical distribution, and is suspected to have been introduced elsewhere.
