= Tomoxena =

Scientific classification
- Kingdom: Animalia
- Phylum: Arthropoda
- Subphylum: Chelicerata
- Class: Arachnida
- Order: Araneae
- Infraorder: Araneomorphae
- Family: Theridiidae
- Genus: Tomoxena; Simon, 1895

Type species
- T. dives Simon, 1895

Species
- T. alearia (Thorell, 1890) – Indonesia (Java, Sumatra); T. dives Simon, 1895 – India; T. flavomaculata Simon, 1895 – Indonesia (Sumatra)

Genus of spiders

Tomoxena is a genus of Asian comb-footed spiders (family Theridiidae) that was first described by Eugène Louis Simon in 1895. As of June 2020 it contains three species, found in Asia: T. alearia, T. dives, and T. flavomaculata.
