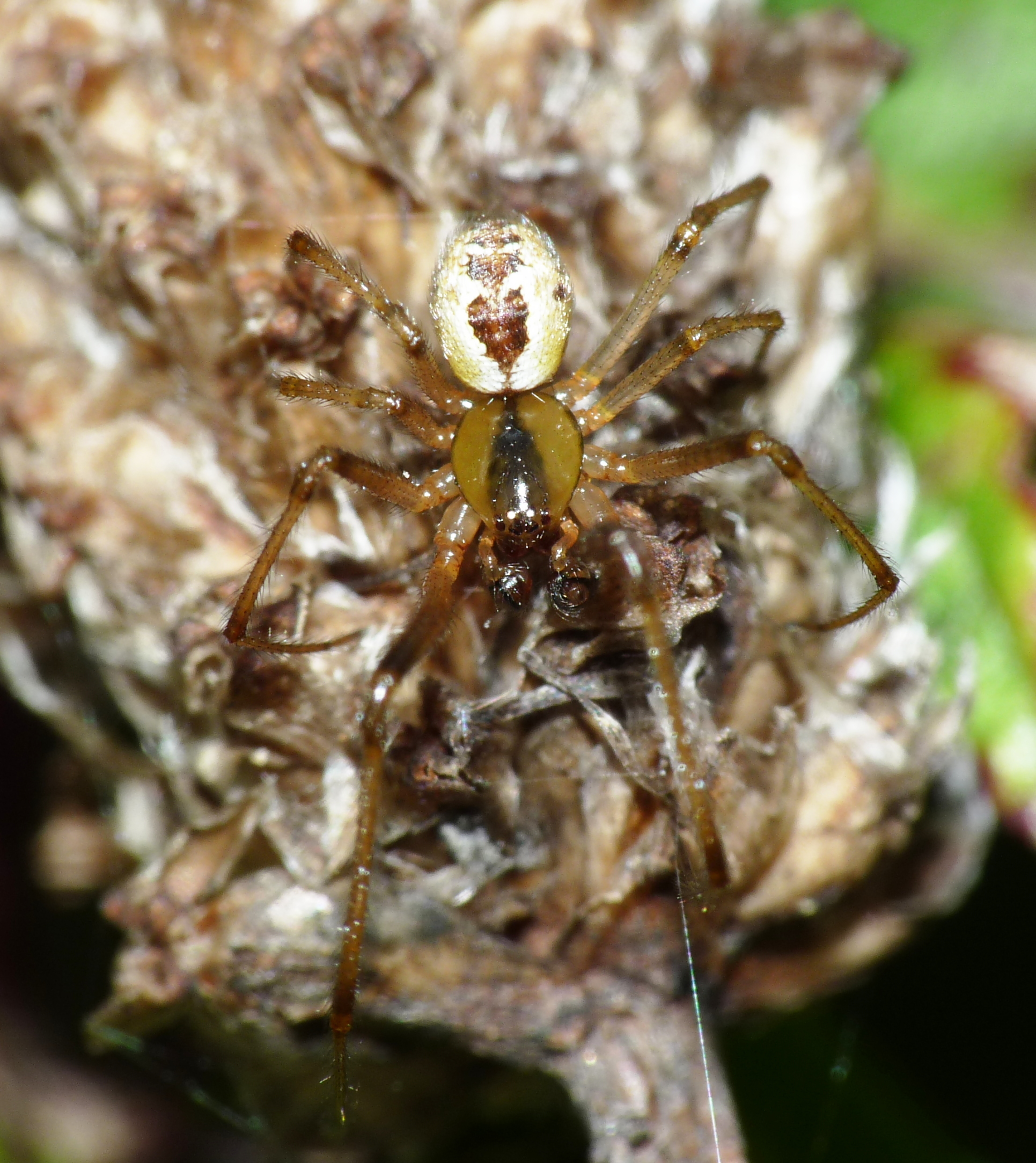
- Male Kochiura aulica

Scientific classification
- Kingdom: Animalia
- Phylum: Arthropoda
- Subphylum: Chelicerata
- Class: Arachnida
- Order: Araneae
- Infraorder: Araneomorphae
- Family: Theridiidae
- Genus: Kochiura; Archer, 1950

Type species
- K. aulica (C. L. Koch, 1838)

Species
- 8, see text

= Kochiura =

Genus of spiders

Kochiura is a genus of comb-footed spiders that was first described by Allan Frost Archer in 1950.

== Species ==
As of May 2020 it contains eight species, found in Europe, Africa, Brazil, Chile, and Iran:

- Kochiura attrita (Nicolet, 1849) – Chile, Juan Fernandez Is.
- Kochiura aulica (C. L. Koch, 1838) (type) – Cape Verde Is., Canary Is., North Africa, Europe, Turkey, Caucasus, Iran
- Kochiura casablanca (Levi, 1963) – Chile
- Kochiura decolorata (Keyserling, 1886) – Brazil
- Kochiura ocellata (Nicolet, 1849) – Chile
- Kochiura olaup (Levi, 1963) – Brazil
- Kochiura rosea (Nicolet, 1849) – Chile, Juan Fernandez Is.
- Kochiura temuco (Levi, 1963) – Chile

Formerly included:

- K. episinoides (Levi, 1963) (Transferred to Chrosiothes)

In synonymy:

- K. bucculenta (Nicolet, 1849) = Kochiura rosea (Nicolet, 1849)
- K. chiloensis = Kochiura ocellata (Nicolet, 1849)
- K. foliacea = Kochiura rosea (Nicolet, 1849)
- K. gracilis (Keyserling, 1884) = Kochiura rosea (Nicolet, 1849)
- K. levipes = Kochiura attrita (Nicolet, 1849)
- K. opima = Kochiura rosea (Nicolet, 1849)
- K. rubicunda = Kochiura rosea (Nicolet, 1849)
- K. virgulata = Kochiura ocellata (Nicolet, 1849)
