= Borneoridion =

Scientific classification
- Kingdom: Animalia
- Phylum: Arthropoda
- Subphylum: Chelicerata
- Class: Arachnida
- Order: Araneae
- Infraorder: Araneomorphae
- Family: Theridiidae
- Genus: Borneoridion; Deeleman & Wunderlich, 2011
- Species: B. spinifer

Binomial name
- Borneoridion spinifer Deeleman & Wunderlich, 2011

Genus of spiders

Borneoridion is a monotypic genus of comb-footed spiders containing the single species, Borneoridion spinifer. It was first described by C. Deeleman & J. Wunderlich in 2011, and is found on Borneo.
