= Eurypoena =

Scientific classification
- Kingdom: Animalia
- Phylum: Arthropoda
- Subphylum: Chelicerata
- Class: Arachnida
- Order: Araneae
- Infraorder: Araneomorphae
- Family: Theridiidae
- Genus: Eurypoena; Wunderlich, 1992
- Species: E. tuberosa

Binomial name
- Eurypoena tuberosa (Wunderlich, 1987)

Subspecies
- E. tuberosa tuberosa (Wunderlich, 1987); E. tuberosa alegranzaensis Wunderlich, 1992

Genus of spiders

Eurypoena is a monotypic genus of comb-footed spiders containing the single species, Eurypoena tuberosa. The species was first described by J. Wunderlich in 1992 who then created the genus in 1992. It is found on the Canary Islands.
