= Ameridion =

Scientific classification
- Kingdom: Animalia
- Phylum: Arthropoda
- Subphylum: Chelicerata
- Class: Arachnida
- Order: Araneae
- Infraorder: Araneomorphae
- Family: Theridiidae
- Genus: Ameridion; Wunderlich, 1995

Type species
- A. petrum (Levi, 1959)

Species
- 27, see text

Genus of spiders

Ameridion is a genus of comb-footed spiders that was first described by J. Wunderlich in 1995. Species of this genus are found in Mexico, Central America, Northern South America and the West Indies.

== Species ==
As of May 2020 it contains twenty-seven species, found in the Caribbean, South America, Costa Rica, Nicaragua, Panama, Guatemala, and Mexico:

- Ameridion armouri (Levi, 1959) – Panama, Trinidad
- Ameridion aspersum (F. O. Pickard-Cambridge, 1902) – Guatemala
- Ameridion atlixco (Levi, 1959) – Mexico
- Ameridion bridgesi (Levi, 1959) – Mexico
- Ameridion chilapa (Levi, 1959) – Mexico
- Ameridion clemens (Levi, 1959) – Jamaica
- Ameridion cobanum (Levi, 1959) – Guatemala
- Ameridion colima (Levi, 1959) – Mexico, Ecuador
- Ameridion lathropi (Levi, 1959) – Panama
- Ameridion malkini (Levi, 1959) – Mexico
- Ameridion marvum (Levi, 1959) – Panama, Venezuela
- Ameridion moctezuma (Levi, 1959) – Mexico
- Ameridion musawas (Levi, 1959) – Nicaragua
- Ameridion paidiscum (Levi, 1959) – Panama
- Ameridion panum (Levi, 1959) – Panama
- Ameridion petrum (Levi, 1959) (type) – Panama, Trinidad, Peru
- Ameridion plantatum (Levi, 1959) – Panama
- Ameridion progum (Levi, 1959) – Panama
- Ameridion quantum (Levi, 1959) – Costa Rica, Panama
- Ameridion reservum (Levi, 1959) – Panama
- Ameridion rinconense (Levi, 1959) – Mexico
- Ameridion ruinum (Levi, 1959) – Mexico
- Ameridion schmidti (Levi, 1959) – Costa Rica
- Ameridion signaculum (Levi, 1959) – Panama, Brazil
- Ameridion signum (Levi, 1959) – Panama
- Ameridion tempum (Levi, 1959) – Panama, Brazil
- Ameridion unanimum (Keyserling, 1891) – Mexico to Brazil

In synonymy:

- A. quemadum = Ameridion unanimum (Keyserling, 1891)
