= Landoppo =

Scientific classification
- Kingdom: Animalia
- Phylum: Arthropoda
- Subphylum: Chelicerata
- Class: Arachnida
- Order: Araneae
- Infraorder: Araneomorphae
- Family: Theridiidae
- Genus: Landoppo; Barrion & Litsinger, 1995
- Species: L. misamisoriensis

Binomial name
- Landoppo misamisoriensis Barrion & Litsinger, 1995

Genus of spiders

Landoppo is a monotypic genus of Filipino comb-footed spiders containing the single species, Landoppo misamisoriensis. It was first described by A. T. Barrion & J. A. Litsinger in 1995, and is found in the Philippines.

== Description ==
This spider is 1.44 millimetres (0.057 in) long, including a cephalothorax that is 0.64 millimetres (0.025 in) long, 0.56 millimetres (0.022 in) wide, and 0.44 millimetres (0.017 in) high and an abdomen that is 0.80 millimetres (0.031 in) long, 0.62 millimetres (0.024 in) wide, and 0.58 millimetres (0.023 in) high.

The cephalothorax is a pale grayish yellow and has a broad dark gray arrow-like band with seven prominent lines. It has eight eyes in two rows, with a reddish brown color between them.
