= Gmogala =

Scientific classification
- Kingdom: Animalia
- Phylum: Arthropoda
- Subphylum: Chelicerata
- Class: Arachnida
- Order: Araneae
- Infraorder: Araneomorphae
- Family: Theridiidae
- Genus: Gmogala; Keyserling, 1890
- Species: G. scarabaeus

Binomial name
- Gmogala scarabaeus Keyserling, 1890

Genus of spiders

Gmogala is a monotypic genus of South Pacific comb-footed spiders containing a single species, Gmogala scarabaeus. It was first described by Eugen von Keyserling in 1890, and is found in Australia and Papua New Guinea.
