= Lokitandroka =

Scientific classification
- Kingdom: Animalia
- Phylum: Arthropoda
- Subphylum: Chelicerata
- Class: Arachnida
- Order: Araneae
- Infraorder: Araneomorphae
- Family: Theridiidae
- Genus: Lokitandroka; Pett & Agnarsson, 2025

Type species
- L. rinha Pett & Agnarsson, 2025

Species
- 5, see text

Genus of spiders

Lokitandroka is a genus of spiders in the family Theridiidae.

== Distribution ==
Lokitandroka is endemic to Madagascar, with one species also found on the Comoros Islands in the Indian Ocean.

== Life style ==
All described species in this genus are kleptoparasites in the webs of larger species, similar to Argyrodes.

== Etymology ==
The genus name is a combination of the Norse god Loki and the Malagasy word "tandroka" (horns), referring to parts of the male anatomy of this genus.

L. rabesahala honors Malagasy political activist Gisèle Rabesahala (1929–2011). L. ratsimanga is named after Malagasy scientist Albert Rakoto Ratsimamanga (1907–2001). L. rinha is named in honor of nature guide Harin’ Hala Rasolondalao (Rin′ha). L. tiana honors MICET employee Vololontiana Razafindratsita (Tiana).

== Species ==
As of January 2026, this genus includes five species:

- Lokitandroka minax (O. Pickard-Cambridge, 1880) – Madagascar, Comoros
- Lokitandroka rabesahala Pett & Agnarsson, 2025 – Madagascar
- Lokitandroka ratsimanga Pett & Agnarsson, 2025 – Madagascar
- Lokitandroka rinha Pett & Agnarsson, 2025 – Madagascar
- Lokitandroka tiana Pett & Agnarsson, 2025 – Madagascar
