= Guaraniella =

Scientific classification
- Kingdom: Animalia
- Phylum: Arthropoda
- Subphylum: Chelicerata
- Class: Arachnida
- Order: Araneae
- Infraorder: Araneomorphae
- Family: Theridiidae
- Genus: Guaraniella; Baert, 1984

Type species
- G. mahnerti Baert, 1984

Species
- G. bracata Baert, 1984 – Brazil, Paraguay; G. mahnerti Baert, 1984 – Brazil, Paraguay

Genus of spiders

Guaraniella is a genus of South American comb-footed spiders that was first described by L. Baert in 1984. As of May 2020 it contains two species, found in Paraguay and Brazil: G. bracata and G. mahnerti.
