= Cameronidion =

Scientific classification
- Kingdom: Animalia
- Phylum: Arthropoda
- Subphylum: Chelicerata
- Class: Arachnida
- Order: Araneae
- Infraorder: Araneomorphae
- Family: Theridiidae
- Genus: Cameronidion; Wunderlich, 2011
- Species: C. punctatellum

Binomial name
- Cameronidion punctatellum Wunderlich, 2011

Genus of spiders

Cameronidion is a monotypic genus of Malaysian comb-footed spiders containing the single species, Cameronidion punctatellum. It was first described by J. Wunderlich in 2011, and is found in Malaysia.
