= Histagonia =

Scientific classification
- Kingdom: Animalia
- Phylum: Arthropoda
- Subphylum: Chelicerata
- Class: Arachnida
- Order: Araneae
- Infraorder: Araneomorphae
- Family: Theridiidae
- Genus: Histagonia; Simon, 1895
- Species: H. deserticola

Binomial name
- Histagonia deserticola Simon, 1895

Monotypic genus of spiders

Histagonia is a monotypic genus of South African comb-footed spiders containing the single species, Histagonia deserticola. It was first described by Eugène Louis Simon in 1895, and is endemic to southern Africa.

== Distribution ==
Histagonia deserticola is found in Botswana and South Africa.

In South Africa, it is known from the Northern Cape province. Notable locations include Augrabies Falls National Park, Tswalu Kalahari Reserve, and Witsand Nature Reserve.

== Habitat and ecology ==
Histagonia deserticola inhabits areas at altitudes ranging from 635 to 1197 m above sea level. Nothing is known about the behaviour of this rare species.

== Conservation ==
Histagonia deserticola is listed as Least Concern by the South African National Biodiversity Institute. Although under-sampled, the species is not suspected to be threatened. It is protected in three protected areas: Augrabies Falls National Park, Witsand Nature Reserve, and Tswalu Kalahari Reserve.
