= Proboscidula =

Scientific classification
- Kingdom: Animalia
- Phylum: Arthropoda
- Subphylum: Chelicerata
- Class: Arachnida
- Order: Araneae
- Infraorder: Araneomorphae
- Family: Theridiidae
- Genus: Proboscidula; Miller, 1970

Type species
- P. loricata Miller, 1970

Species
- P. loricata Miller, 1970 – Angola; P. milleri Knoflach, 1995 – Rwanda

Genus of spiders

Proboscidula is a genus of African comb-footed spiders that was first described by F. Miller in 1970. As of June 2020 it contains two species, found in Africa: P. loricata and P. milleri.
