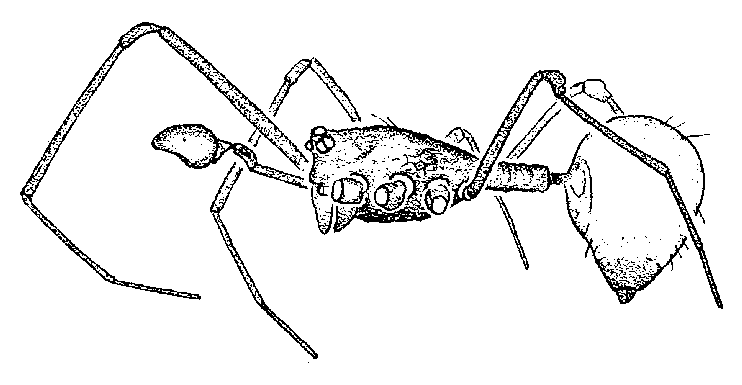
- Male Cerocida strigosa

Scientific classification
- Domain: Eukaryota
- Kingdom: Animalia
- Phylum: Arthropoda
- Subphylum: Chelicerata
- Class: Arachnida
- Order: Araneae
- Infraorder: Araneomorphae
- Family: Theridiidae
- Genus: Cerocida; Simon, 1894

Species
- Cerocida ducke Marques & Buckup, 1989; Cerocida strigosa Simon, 1894

= Cerocida =

Genus of spiders

Cerocida is a spider genus known only from tropical South America.

Both sexes of C. strigosa have a cephalothorax with posterior stalk and raised reticulate pattern, and long legs. The female has a body length of 1.5mm, while males are even 1.7mm; normally spider males are at least slightly smaller than females. Specimens were collecting by sifting litter. The species is probably an ant mimic.
