= Heterotheridion =

Scientific classification
- Kingdom: Animalia
- Phylum: Arthropoda
- Subphylum: Chelicerata
- Class: Arachnida
- Order: Araneae
- Infraorder: Araneomorphae
- Family: Theridiidae
- Genus: Heterotheridion; Wunderlich, 2008
- Species: H. nigrovariegatum

Binomial name
- Heterotheridion nigrovariegatum (Simon, 1873)

Genus of spiders

Heterotheridion is a monotypic genus of comb-footed spiders with a palearctic distribution, containing the single species, Heterotheridion nigrovariegatum. It was first described by J. Wunderlich in 2008.
