= Tamanidion =

Scientific classification
- Kingdom: Animalia
- Phylum: Arthropoda
- Subphylum: Chelicerata
- Class: Arachnida
- Order: Araneae
- Infraorder: Araneomorphae
- Family: Theridiidae
- Genus: Tamanidion; Wunderlich, 2011
- Species: T. multidenticuli

Binomial name
- Tamanidion multidenticuli Wunderlich, 2011

Monotypic genus of spiders

Tamanidion is a monotypic genus of Asian comb-footed spiders containing the single species, Tamanidion multidenticuli. It was first described by J. Wunderlich in 2011, and is found in Malaysia.
