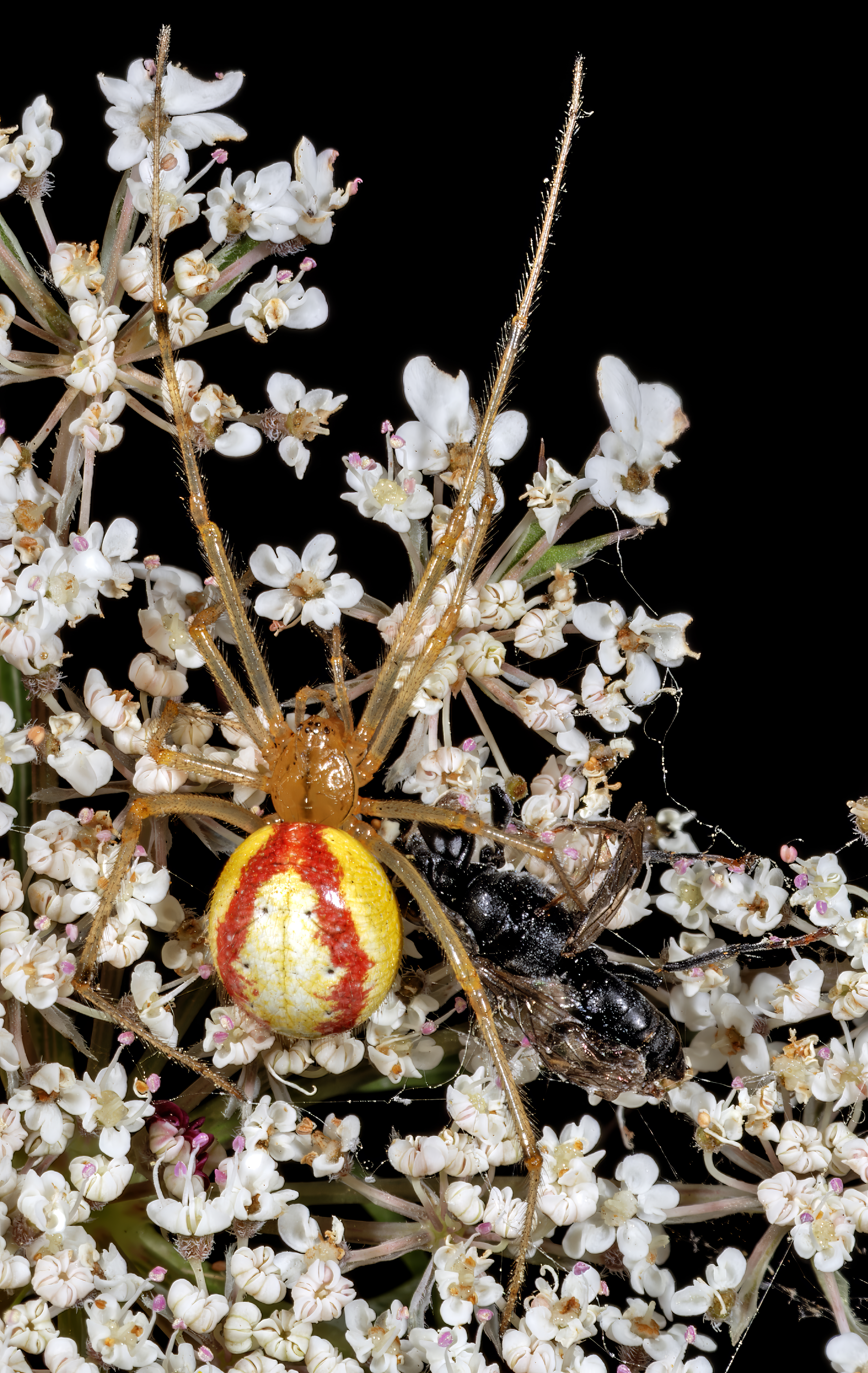
- Enoplognatha ovata

Scientific classification
- Kingdom: Animalia
- Phylum: Arthropoda
- Subphylum: Chelicerata
- Class: Arachnida
- Order: Araneae
- Infraorder: Araneomorphae
- Family: Theridiidae; Sundevall, 1833

Diversity
- 138 genera, 2,619 species
- blue: reported countries (WSC) green: observation hotspots (iNaturalist)

= Theridiidae =

Tangle-web spiders Temporal range: Cretaceous–present

Family of spiders

Theridiidae, also known as the tangle-web spiders, cobweb spiders and comb-footed spiders, is a large family of araneomorph spiders first described by Carl Jakob Sundevall in 1833. This diverse, globally distributed family includes around 3,000 species in 128 genera, and is the most common arthropod group found in human dwellings throughout the world.

Theridiid spiders are both entelegyne, meaning that the females have a genital plate, and ecribellate, meaning that they spin sticky capture silk instead of woolly silk. They have a comb of serrated bristles (setae) on the tarsus of the fourth leg.

The family includes some model organisms for research, including the medically important widow spiders. They are important to studies characterizing their venom and its clinical manifestation, but widow spiders are also used in research on spider silk and sexual biology, including sexual cannibalism. Anelosimus are also model organisms, used for the study of sociality, because it has evolved frequently within the genus, allowing comparative studies across species, and because it contains species varying from solitary to permanently social. These spiders are also a promising model for the study of inbreeding because all permanently social species are highly inbred.

The Hawaiian Theridion grallator is used as a model to understand the selective forces and the genetic basis of color polymorphism within species. T. grallator is known as the "happyface" spider, as certain morphs have a pattern resembling a smiley face or a grinning clown face on their yellow body.

== Webs ==
They often build tangle space webs, hence the common name, but Theridiidae has a large diversity of spider web forms. Many trap ants and other ground dwelling insects using elastic, sticky silk trap lines leading to the soil surface. Webs remain in place for extended periods and are expanded and repaired, but no regular pattern of web replacement has been observed.

The well studied kleptoparasitic members of Argyrodinae (Argyrodes, Faiditus, and Neospintharus) live in the webs of larger spiders and pilfer small prey caught by their host's web. They eat prey killed by the host spider, consume silk from the host web, and sometimes attack and eat the host itself.

Theridiid gumfoot-webs consist of frame lines that anchor them to surroundings and of support threads, which possess viscid silk. These can either have a central retreat (Achaearanea-type) or a peripheral retreat (Latrodectus-type). Building gum-foot lines is a unique, stereotyped behaviour, and is likely homologous for Theridiidae and its sister family Nesticidae.

Among webs without gumfooted lines, some contain viscid silk (Theridion-type) and some that are sheet-like, which do not contain viscid silk (Coleosoma-type). However, there are many undescribed web forms.

== Taxonomy ==
The largest genus is Theridion with over 600 species, but it is not monophyletic. Parasteatoda, previously Achaearanea, is another large genus that includes the North American common house spider.

== Genera ==
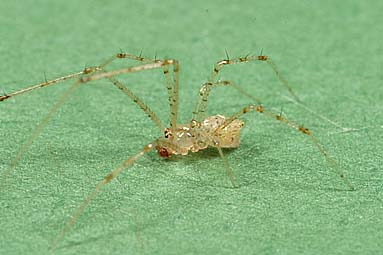
Chrysso pulcherrima

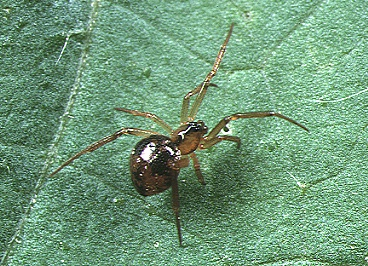
Coscinida japonica

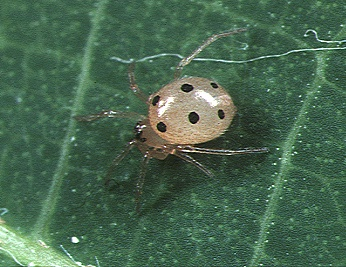
Dipoena martinae

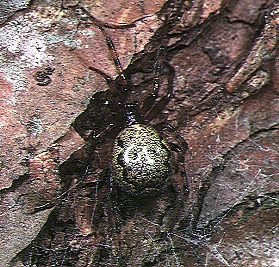
Enoplognatha abrupta

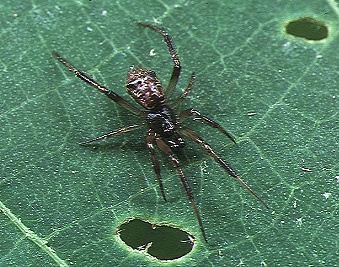
Epsinus nubilus

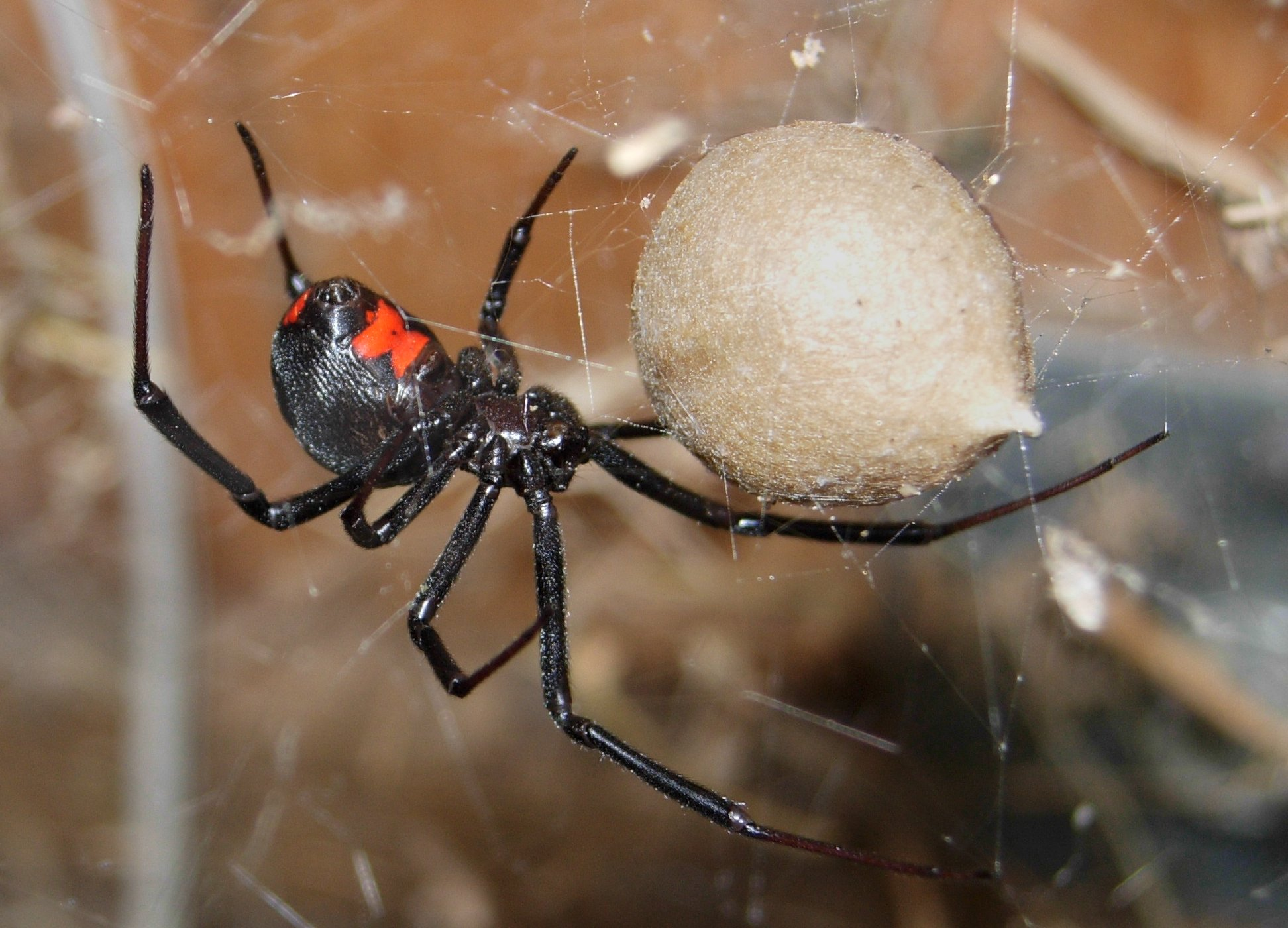
Latrodectus mactans, a black widow spider

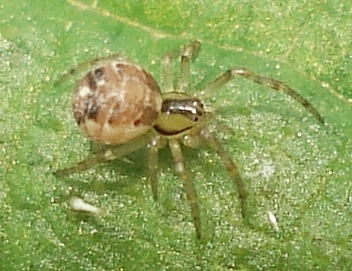
Theridion impressum

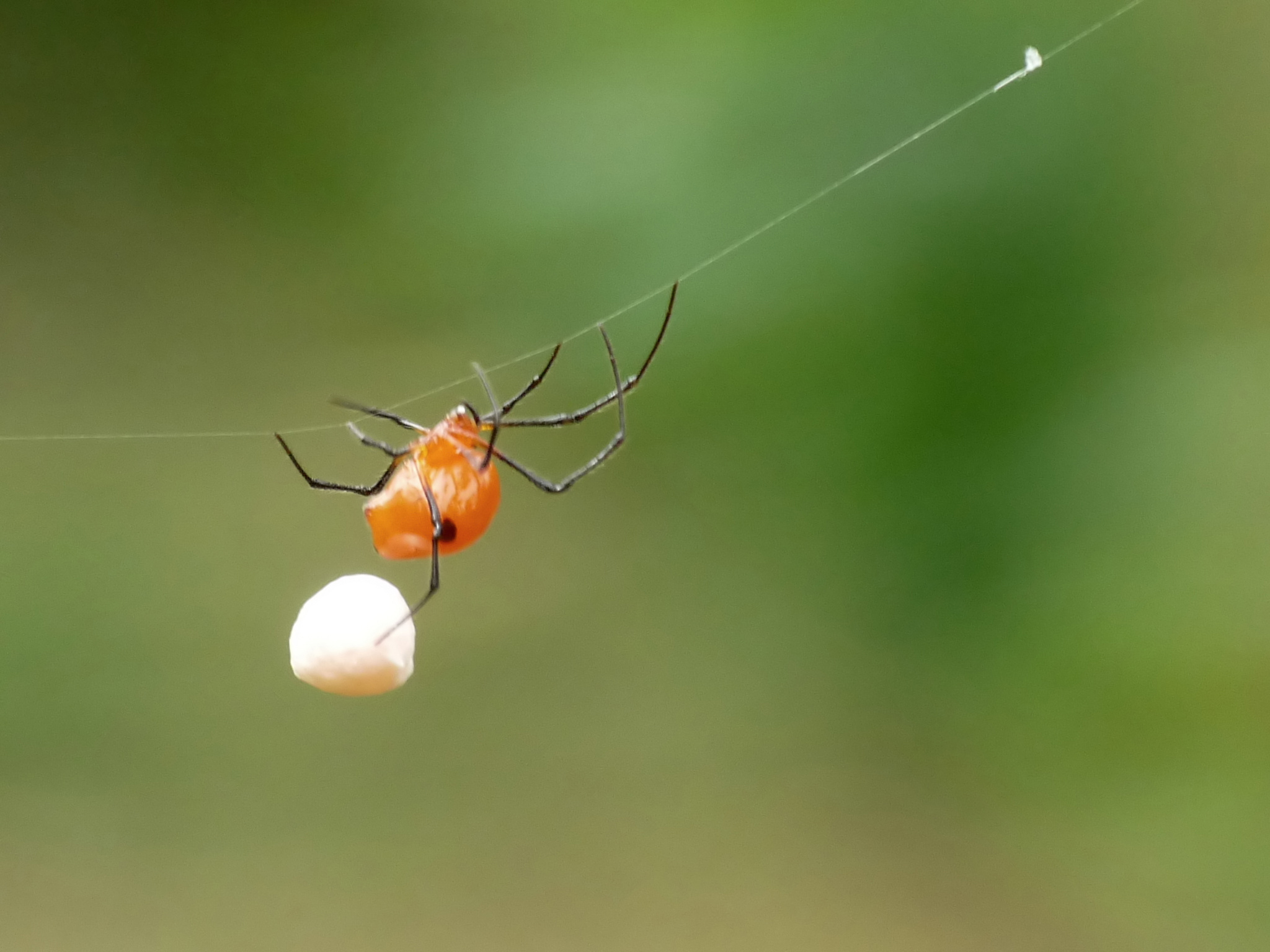
Theridula angula moving from one tree to another carrying the egg sac

As of October 2026, this family includes 140 genera and 2,636 species:

- Achaearanea Strand, 1929 – Gabon, Comoros, South Africa, Ivory Coast, China, Southeast Asia, India, Canary Islands, Puerto Rico, Costa Rica, Panama, Australia, South America
- Achaearyopa Barrion & Litsinger, 1995 – Philippines
- Achaeridion Wunderlich, 2008 – Turkey
- Allothymoites Ono, 2007 – China, Japan, Vietnam
- Ameridion Wunderlich, 1995 – North America, South America
- Anatea Berland, 1927 – Australia, New Caledonia
- Anatolidion Wunderlich, 2008 – Algeria, Morocco, Europe
- Anelosimus Simon, 1891 – Africa, Asia, Hispaniola, Jamaica, Mexico, United States, Australia, New Guinea, South America
- Anttheridion Jocqué & Vanuytven, 2025 – Democratic Republic of the Congo, Malaysia
- Argyrodella Saaristo, 2006 – Madagascar, Seychelles
- Argyrodes Simon, 1864 – Africa, Asia, Canary Islands, Jamaica, Hawaii, Mexico, United States, Oceania, French Guiana, Galapagos, Peru, Caribbean to Argentina, East Africa, Mediterranean to West Africa, Tongatabu. Introduced to Seychelles, South Africa, St. Helena, India, Hawaii, Madagascar?
- Ariamnes Thorell, 1869 – DR Congo, Equatorial Guinea, Gabon, South Africa, Guinea-Bissau, Asia, Cuba, Hispaniola, Costa Rica, Panama, Hawaii, Mexico, Australia, Papua New Guinea, New Zealand, Brazil, Peru
- Asagena Sundevall, 1833 – Algeria, Tunisia, Asia, Switzerland, Russia, Greece, Italy, Slovenia, France, North America
- Asiopisinus Hu, Wei, Liu & Xu, 2025 – Eastern Asia
- Asygyna Agnarsson, 2006 – Madagascar
- Audifia Keyserling, 1884 – Congo, Guinea-Bissau, Bolivia, Brazil
- Bardala Saaristo, 2006 – Seychelles
- Borneoridion Deeleman & Wunderlich, 2011 – Malaysia
- Brunepisinus Yoshida & Koh, 2011 – Borneo
- Cabello Levi, 1964 – Venezuela
- Cameronidion Wunderlich, 2011 – Malaysia
- Campanicola Yoshida, 2015 – Eastern Asia
- Canalidion Wunderlich, 2008 – Russia, Scandinavia
- Carniella Thaler & Steinberger, 1988 – Angola, China, Korea, Taiwan, Indonesia, Thailand, Nepal, Central Europe, Romania, Belgium
- Cephalobares O. Pickard-Cambridge, 1871 – China, India, Sri Lanka
- Cerocida Simon, 1894 – Brazil, Guyana, Venezuela
- Chikunia Yoshida, 2009 – Asia, Russia
- Chorizopella Lawrence, 1947 – South Africa
- Chrosiothes Simon, 1894 – Eastern Asia, Dominican Rep, Jamaica, St. Vincent, Mexico, United States, South America
- Chrysso O. Pickard-Cambridge, 1882 – Asia, Hungary, Russia, France, Trinidad, Costa Rica, Panama, North America, South America
- Coleosoma O. Pickard-Cambridge, 1882 – Cape Verde, Asia
- Coscinida Simon, 1895 – Angola, Congo, Tanzania, Asia, southern Europe
- Craspedisia Simon, 1894 – China, Hispaniola, Brazil
- Crustulina Menge, 1868 – Ethiopia, Madagascar, Tanzania, Algeria, Egypt, Morocco, Asia, Canary Islands, Ukraine, Russia, Jamaica, North America, Australia, New Caledonia, New Guinea, East Africa
- Cryptachaea Archer, 1946 – Asia, Russia, Trinidad, Costa Rica, Panama, North America, Australia, New Zealand, South America
- Cyllognatha L. Koch, 1872 – India, Australia, Samoa
- Deelemanella Yoshida, 2003 – Madagascar, Malaysia, Papua New Guinea
- Dipoena Thorell, 1869 – Africa, Asia, Europe, North America, Australia, Vanuatu, South America
- Dipoenata Wunderlich, 1988 – Madeira, Malta, Panama, Brazil, Venezuela
- Dipoenoides Chamberlin, 1925
- Dipoenura Simon, 1909 – Sierra Leone, China, Indonesia, Laos, Vietnam, India
- Echinotheridion Levi, 1963 – Canary Islands, Madeira, South America
- Emertonella Bryant, 1945 – China, Mexico, United States. Introduced to China, Japan, India, Pakistan, Sri Lanka, New Guinea
- Enoplognatha Pavesi, 1880 – South Africa, Cape Verde, Asia, Europe, North America, Australia, Chile, Peru, North Africa. Introduced to St. Helena, Canada
- Episinus Walckenaer, 1809 – Africa, Asia, Europe, Panama, Mexico, United States, New Zealand, South America
- Euryopis Menge, 1868 – Africa, Asia, Europe, Jamaica, North America, Australia, New Caledonia, New Zealand, Argentina, Bolivia, Brazil
- Eurypoena Wunderlich, 1992 – Cape Verde, Canary Islands
- Exalbidion Wunderlich, 1995 – Guatemala, Panama, Mexico, Caribbean to Brazil
- Faiditus Keyserling, 1884 – North America, South America
- Famakytta Pett & Agnarsson, 2025 – Madagascar, Seychelles, Korea, India, New Guinea
- Glebych Eskov & Marusik, 2021 – Peru
- Gmogala Keyserling, 1890 – Australia, New Guinea
- Grancanaridion Wunderlich, 2011 – Canary Islands
- Guaraniella Baert, 1984 – Brazil, Paraguay
- Gushangzao Lin & Li, 2024 – China, Japan
- Gyro Lin & Li, 2024 – China
- Hadrotarsus Thorell, 1881 – Taiwan, Australia, New Guinea. Introduced to Belgium
- Helenidion Sherwood, Marusik, Fowler, Stevens & Joshua, 2024 – St. Helena
- Helvibis Keyserling, 1884 – Trinidad, Panama, Brazil, Chile, Peru
- Helvidia Thorell, 1890 – Indonesia
- Hentziectypus Archer, 1946 – North America, Bolivia, Brazil, Colombia
- Heterotheridion Wunderlich, 2008 – China, Caucasus, Iran, Turkey, Russia
- Hetschkia Keyserling, 1886 – Brazil
- Histagonia Simon, 1895 – Botswana, South Africa
- Icona Forster, 1955 – New Zealand
- Jamaitidion Wunderlich, 1995 – Jamaica
- Janula Strand, 1932 – Asia, North America, Australia, South America
- Keijiella Yoshida, 2016 – Eastern Asia, Laos
- Knoflachia Marusik & Eskov, 2024 – Russia
- Kochiura Archer, 1950 – Cape Verde, St. Helena, Western Asia, Canary Islands, Madeira, Brazil, Chile, North Africa, Juan Fernández Islands
- Landoppo Barrion & Litsinger, 1995 – Philippines
- Lasaeola Simon, 1881 – Asia, Azores, Canary Islands, Russia, Portugal, Spain, Panama, Mexico, United States, Peru, Venezuela
- Latrodectus Walckenaer, 1805 – Africa, Asia, Australia, Europe, North America, New Zealand, South America
- Lokitandroka Pett & Agnarsson, 2025 – Comoros, Madagascar
- Macaridion Wunderlich, 1992 – Canary Islands, Madeira
- Magnopholcomma Wunderlich, 2008 – Australia
- Megama Hu, Zhong, Liu & Li, 2026 – China, Japan
- Meotipa Simon, 1895 – Asia, Pacific Islands. Introduced to Americas, Tropical Africa
- Molione Thorell, 1893 – Asia
- Moneta O. Pickard-Cambridge, 1871 – Seychelles, Asia, Russia, Australia, New Caledonia, New Zealand
- Montanidion Wunderlich, 2011 – Malaysia
- Nanume Saaristo, 2006 – Seychelles
- Neopisinus Marques, Buckup & Rodrigues, 2011 – Cuba, Hispaniola, Panama, Mexico, Brazil, Peru
- Neospintharus Exline, 1950 – Madagascar, Seychelles, Asia, Cyprus, Greece, Panama, North America, South America
- Neottiura Menge, 1868 – Algeria, Asia, Europe
- Nesopholcomma Ono, 2010 – Japan
- Nesticodes Archer, 1950 – Central. Introduced to St. Helena, China, Japan, Indonesia, Sri Lanka, Macaronesia, New Zealand, North Africa, Pacific Islands
- Nihonhimea Yoshida, 2016 – Seychelles, Asia. Introduced to Pakistan, Australia, New Guinea
- Nipponidion Yoshida, 2001 – Japan
- Nojimaia Yoshida, 2009 – China, Japan
- Ohlertidion Wunderlich, 2008 – Russia, North America
- Okumaella Yoshida, 2009 – Japan, Korea
- Paidiscura Archer, 1950 – Cape Verde, China, Japan, Korea, Azerbaijan, Georgia, Turkey, Europe, North Africa to Middle East
- Parasteatoda Archer, 1946 – Tunisia, Asia, Russia, Australia, New Guinea, Solomon Islands
- Paratheridula Levi, 1957 – USA to Chile
- Pholcomma Thorell, 1869 – Japan, Caucasus, Iran, Turkey, Azores, North America, New Zealand, Niue, Samoa, Argentina, Brazil, North Africa
- Phoroncidia Westwood, 1835 – Africa, Asia, Europe, Cuba, Jamaica, North America, Australia, Fiji, New Caledonia, Papua New Guinea, New Zealand, Samoa, South America
- Phycosoma O. Pickard-Cambridge, 1880 – Africa, Madagascar, Seychelles, Asia, Russia, Jamaica, Panama, New Zealand, Galapagos. Introduced to Hawaii
- Phylloneta Archer, 1950 – Asia, Russia, Spain, United States, North Africa. Introduced to St. Helena
- Physcoa Thorell, 1895 – China
- Platnickina Koçak & Kemal, 2008 – Kenya, Cape Verde, Asia, Russia, North America
- Proboscidula Miller, 1970 – Angola, Rwanda
- Propostira Simon, 1894 – India, Sri Lanka
- Pycnoepisinus Wunderlich, 2008 – Kenya
- Rhinocosmetus Vanuytven, Jocqué & Deeleman-Reinhold, 2024 – Asia
- Rhinoliparus Vanuytven, Jocqué & Deeleman-Reinhold, 2024 – Southeast Asia, Australia, New Caledonia, Papua New Guinea
- Rhomphaea L. Koch, 1872 – Mozambique, Seychelles, Tanzania, South Africa, St. Helena, Asia, Europe, St. Vincent, New Zealand, French Polynesia, Samoa, Argentina, Brazil, Venezuela. Introduced to India
- Robertus O. Pickard-Cambridge, 1879 – Democratic Republic of the Congo, Asia, Europe, North America
- Ruborridion Wunderlich, 2011 – India, Spain
- Rugathodes Archer, 1950 – Kazakhstan, Japan, Iran, Azores, Canary Islands, Madeira, Russia, North America. Introduced to Britain
- Sardinidion Wunderlich, 1995 – Georgia, Turkey, North Africa
- Selkirkiella Berland, 1924 – Argentina, Chile, Falkland Islands
- Sesato Saaristo, 2006 – Seychelles
- Seycellesa Koçak & Kemal, 2008 – Seychelles
- Simitidion Wunderlich, 1992 – Tunisia, Kazakhstan, Western Asia, Canary Islands, Cyprus, Greece, Spain, North Africa. Introduced to Canada
- Spheropistha Yaginuma, 1957 – Eastern Asia, Australia
- Spinembolia Saaristo, 2006 – Seychelles, China, Indonesia
- Spintharus Hentz, 1850 – North America, Brazil, Saint Kitts
- Steatoda Sundevall, 1833 – Worldwide
- Stemmops O. Pickard-Cambridge, 1894 – Asia, North America, South America
- Stoda Saaristo, 2006 – Seychelles
- Styposis Simon, 1894 – Congo, Puerto Rico, Nicaragua, Panama, United States, South America
- Takayus Yoshida, 2001 – China, Japan, Korea, Russia
- Tamanidion Wunderlich, 2011 – Malaysia
- Theonoe Simon, 1881 – Tanzania, Austria, Germany, Spain, North America
- Theridion Walckenaer, 1805 – Worldwide
- Theridula Emerton, 1882 – Kenya, Madagascar, Tunisia, China, Japan, Korea, Madeira, Spain, Guatemala, Panama, North America, Brazil, Ecuador, Peru
- Thwaitesia O. Pickard-Cambridge, 1881 – Africa, China, Indonesia, Myanmar, Vietnam, India, Sri Lanka, Trinidad, Australia, New Guinea, Brazil
- Thymoites Keyserling, 1884 – Tanzania, China, Japan, Korea, Indonesia, Vietnam, Russia, Scandinavia, North America, South America
- Tidarren Chamberlin & Ivie, 1934 – Africa, Yemen, Canary Islands, Spain. Introduced to Venezuela
- Tomoxena Simon, 1895 – Indonesia, India
- Troglotheridion Hu & Liu, 2025 – China
- Trust Sherwood, Marusik, Wilkins, P. Ashmole & M. Ashmole, 2024 – St. Helena
- Vigdisia Agnarsson, Kuntner, Yu & Gregorič, 2025 – Madagascar
- Wamba O. Pickard-Cambridge, 1896 – Panama, United States, Ecuador, Caribbean to Argentina
- Wirada Keyserling, 1886 – Mexico, South America
- Yoroa Baert, 1984 – Australia, New Guinea
- Yunohamella Yoshida, 2007 – China, Japan, Korea, Indonesia, Poland, Russia, Estonia, Finland
- Zercidium Benoit, 1977 – St. Helena

About 36 extinct genera have also been placed in the family:

- †Balticoridion Wunderlich, 2008 – Baltic amber – Eocene
- †Balticpholcomma Wunderlich, 2008 – Baltic amber – Eocene
- †Burmatheridon Wunderlich, 2018 – Burmese amber – Cretaceous
- †Caudasinus Wunderlich, 2008 – Baltic amber – Eocene
- †Clavibertus Wunderlich, 2008 – Baltic amber – Eocene
- †Clya C. L. Koch & Berendt, 1854 – Baltic amber, Rovno amber – Eocene/Oligocene
- †Cornutidion Wunderlich, 1988 – Dominican amber – Miocene
- †Cretotheridion Wunderlich, 2015 – Burmese amber – Cretaceous
- †Cymbiopholcomma Wunderlich, 2008 – Baltic amber – Eocene
- †Eoasagena Wunderlich, 2008 – Baltic amber – Eocene
- †Eolyrifer Wunderlich, 2008 – Baltic amber – Eocene
- †Eomysmena Petrunkevitch, 1942 – Baltic amber, Chiapas amber – Eocene, Miocene
- †Eoteutana Wunderlich, 2008 – Baltic amber – Eocene
- †Euryopus Menge in C. L. Koch & Berendt, 1854 – Baltic amber – Eocene
- †Femurraptor Wunderlich, 2011 – Dominican amber – Miocene
- †Globulidion Wunderlich, 2008 – Baltic amber – Eocene
- †Hirsutipalpus Wunderlich, 2008 – Baltic amber – Eocene
- †Kochiuridion Wunderlich, 2008 – Baltic amber – Eocene
- †Medela Petrunkevitch, 1942 – Baltic amber – Eocene
- †Mimetidion Wunderlich, 2008 – Baltic amber – Eocene
- †Nanomysmena Petrunkevitch, 1958 – Baltic amber – Eocene
- †Nanosteatoda Wunderlich, 2008 – Baltic amber – Eocene
- †Obscuropholcomma Wunderlich, 2008 – Baltic amber, Rovno amber – Eocene/Oligocene
- †Praetereuryopis Wunderlich, 2008 – Baltic amber – Eocene
- †Praetereuryopis Wunderlich, 2008 – Baltic amber – Eocene
- †Pronepos Petrunkevitch, 1963 – Chiapas amber – Miocene
- †Protosteatoda Wunderlich, 2008 – Baltic amber – Eocene
- †Pseudoteutana Wunderlich, 2008 – Baltic amber – Eocene
- †Rugapholcomma Wunderlich, 2008 – Baltic amber – Eocene
- †Spinisinus Wunderlich, 2008 – Baltic amber – Eocene
- †Spinitharinus Wunderlich, 2008 – Baltic amber – Eocene
- †Succinobertus Wunderlich, 2008 – Baltic amber – Eocene
- †Succinura Wunderlich, 2008 – Baltic amber – Eocene
- †Thyelia C. L. Koch & Berendt, 1854 – Baltic amber – Eocene
- †Unispinatoda Wunderlich, 2008 – Baltic amber – Eocene
- †Vicipholcomma Wunderlich, 2008 – Baltic amber – Eocene
- †Rovnopholcomma Eskov et al., 2026 – Rovno amber – Eocene/Oligocene

The oldest known stem-group member of the family is Cretotheridion from the Cenomanian aged Burmese amber of Myanmar.
