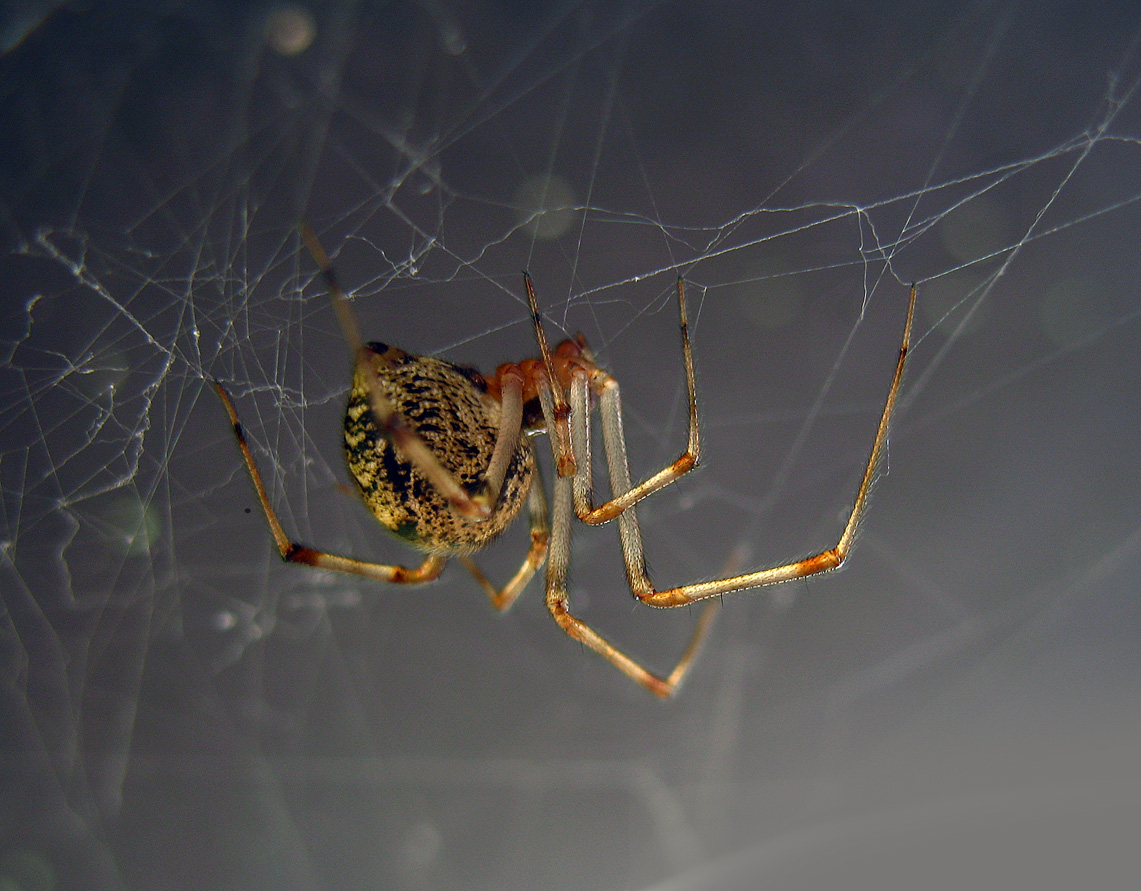
- female Achaearanea sp.?
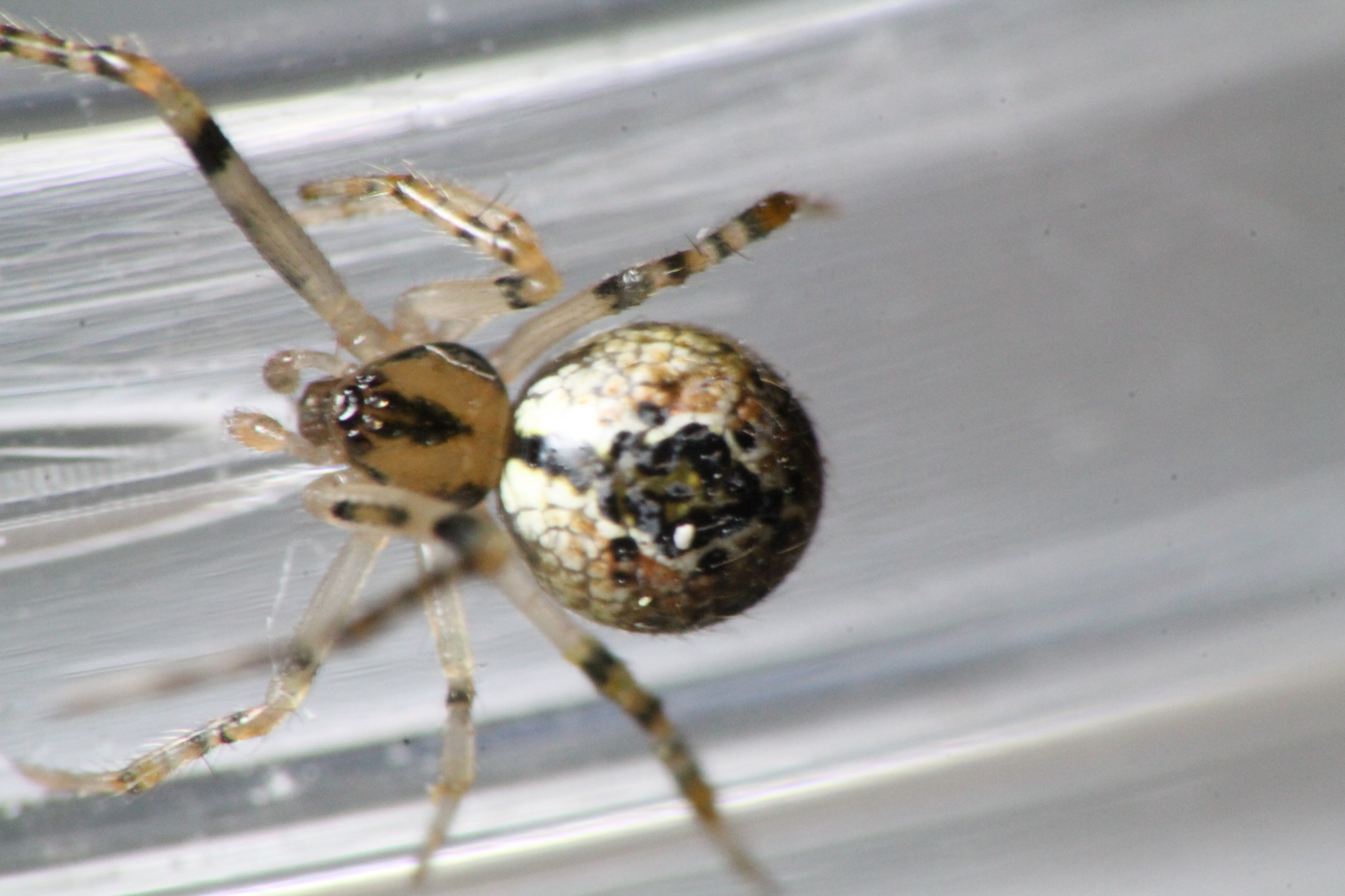
- female A. propera from New Zealand

Scientific classification
- Kingdom: Animalia
- Phylum: Arthropoda
- Subphylum: Chelicerata
- Class: Arachnida
- Order: Araneae
- Infraorder: Araneomorphae
- Family: Theridiidae
- Genus: Achaearanea; Strand, 1929

Type species
- A. trapezoidalis (Taczanowski, 1873)

Species
- 27, see text

= Achaearanea =

Achaearanea Temporal range: Neogene– Present

Genus of spiders

Achaearanea is a genus of comb-footed spiders that was first described by Embrik Strand in 1929.

It used to include the extremely abundant common house spider, which was transferred to genus Parasteatoda in 2006, together with many other species. A. veruculata and many more species were moved to genus Cryptachaea in 2008. Others were moved to the revived Henziectypus. The genus was thus reduced from about 150 species to about thirty species during major revisions. Possibly even more species should be transferred to other genera.

== Distribution ==
Species are found around the world, with several species from South America, China and Korea, India, Australia and Africa. Some species are endemic to several small islands.

== Life style ==
Members of Achaearanea build an irregular network of threads, usually in a sheltered place. These spiders construct untidy tangled cob-webs amongst trees and along walls. Their webs sometimes contain a leaf or other debris used as shelter.

The male and female may occupy the same web for some time before mating occurs. After mating, the female constructs up to eight pear-shaped papery brown egg-sacs. They feed on various insects, including ants and other spiders.

== Description ==
This genus includes small and large theridiids. The legs are medium long, with spines and usually many hairs. Their web is an irregular network of threads, usually in a sheltered place.

== Species ==
As of October 2025, this genus includes 27 extant species and 1 extinct specie2:

- Achaearanea alboinsignita Locket, 1980 – Comoros
- Achaearanea baltoformis Yin & Peng, 2012 – China
- Achaearanea biarclata Yin & Bao, 2012 – China
- Achaearanea budana Tikader, 1970 – India
- Achaearanea coilioducta Yin, 2012 – China
- Achaearanea diglipuriensis Tikader, 1977 – India (Andaman Is.)
- Achaearanea disparata Denis, 1965 – Gabon, Ivory Coast
- Achaearanea diversipes (Rainbow, 1920) – Australia (Norfolk Is., Lord Howe Is.)
- Achaearanea dubitabilis Wunderlich, 1987 – Canary Islands
- Achaearanea durgae Tikader, 1970 – India
- Achaearanea epicosma (Rainbow, 1920) – Australia (Lord Howe Is.)
- Achaearanea extumida Xing, Gao & Zhu, 1994 – China
- Achaearanea flavomaculata Yin, 2012 – China
- Achaearanea globispira Henschel & Jocqué, 1994 – South Africa
- Achaearanea hieroglyphica (Mello-Leitão, 1940) – Peru, Brazil, French Guiana
- Achaearanea inopinata Brignoli, 1972 – Venezuela
- Achaearanea linhan Yin & Bao, 2012 – China
- Achaearanea machaera Levi, 1959 – Panama
- Achaearanea maricaoensis (Bryant, 1942) – Panama, Puerto Rico
- Achaearanea micratula (Banks, 1909) – Costa Rica
- Achaearanea nigrodecorata (Rainbow, 1920) – Australia (Lord Howe Is.)
- Achaearanea propera (Keyserling, 1890) – Australia (New South Wales, Tasmania, Lord Howe Is.)
- Achaearanea septemguttata (Simon, 1909) – Vietnam
- Achaearanea simaoica Zhu, 1998 – China
- Achaearanea tingo Levi, 1963 – Peru, Brazil
- Achaearanea trapezoidalis (Taczanowski, 1873) – Panama to Paraguay (type species)
- Achaearanea triangularis Patel, 2005 – India
- †Achaearanea extincta Wunderlich, 1988 – Dominican amber – Miocene

List of formerly included species
- A. acoreensis (Berland, 1932) (Transferred to Cryptachaea)
- A. alacris (Keyserling, 1884) (Transferred to Cryptachaea)
- A. altiventer (Keyserling, 1884) (Transferred to Cryptachaea)
- A. ambera Levi, 1963 (Transferred to Cryptachaea)
- A. analista Levi, 1963 (Transferred to Cryptachaea)
- A. anastema Levi, 1963 (Transferred to Cryptachaea)
- A. angulithorax (Bösenberg & Strand, 1906) (Transferred to Parasteatoda)
- A. anna Levi, 1959 (Transferred to Hentziectypus)
- A. apex Levi, 1959 (Transferred to Hentziectypus)
- A. asiatica (Bösenberg & Strand, 1906) (Transferred to Parasteatoda)
- A. azteca (Chamberlin & Ivie, 1936) (Transferred to Cryptachaea)
- A. banosensis Levi, 1963 (Transferred to Cryptachaea)
- A. barra Levi, 1963 (Transferred to Cryptachaea)
- A. bellula (Keyserling, 1891) (Transferred to Cryptachaea)
- A. bentifica (Keyserling, 1891) (Transferred to Cryptachaea)
- A. blattea (Urquhart, 1886) (Transferred to Cryptachaea)
- A. boqueronica (Kraus, 1955) (Transferred to Parasteatoda)
- A. brookesiana Barrion & Litsinger, 1995 (Transferred to Parasteatoda)
- A. caboverdensis Schmidt & Piepho, 1994 (Transferred to Paidiscura)
- A. caliensis Levi, 1963 (Transferred to Cryptachaea)
- A. cambridgei (Petrunkevitch, 1911) (Transferred to Chrysso)
- A. campanulata Chen, 1993 (Transferred to Campanicola)
- A. camura (Simon, 1877) (Transferred to Parasteatoda)
- A. canionis (Chamberlin & Gertsch, 1929) (Transferred to Cryptachaea)
- A. caqueza Levi, 1963 (Transferred to Cryptachaea)
- A. catapetraea (Gertsch & Archer, 1942) (Transferred to Cryptachaea)
- A. celsabdomina Zhu, 1998 (Transferred to Parasteatoda)
- A. chilensis Levi, 1963 (Transferred to Cryptachaea)
- A. chiricahua Levi, 1955 (Transferred to Cryptachaea)
- A. cingulata Zhu, 1998 (Transferred to Parasteatoda)
- A. cinnabarina Levi, 1963 (Transferred to Cryptachaea)
- A. conigera (Simon, 1914) (Transferred to Achaeridion)
- A. conjuncta (Gertsch & Mulaik, 1936) (Transferred to Hentziectypus)
- A. credula (Gertsch & Davis, 1936) (Transferred to Hentziectypus)
- A. culicivora (Bösenberg & Strand, 1906) (Transferred to Parasteatoda)
- A. dalana Buckup & Marques, 1991 (Transferred to Cryptachaea)
- A. daliensis Zhu, 1998 (Transferred to Parasteatoda)
- A. dea Buckup & Marques, 2006 (Transferred to Cryptachaea)
- A. decorata (L. Koch, 1867) (Transferred to Parasteatoda)
- A. diamantina Levi, 1963 (Transferred to Cryptachaea)
- A. digitus Buckup & Marques, 2006 (Transferred to Cryptachaea)
- A. dromedaria (Simon, 1880) (Transferred to Paidiscura)
- A. dromedariformis (Roewer, 1942) (Transferred to Cryptachaea)
- A. ducta Zhu, 1998 (Transferred to Parasteatoda)
- A. eramus Levi, 1963 (Transferred to Cryptachaea)
- A. extrilida (Keyserling, 1890) (Transferred to Cryptachaea)
- A. ferrumequina (Bösenberg & Strand, 1906) (Transferred to Campanicola)
- A. florendida Levi, 1959 (Transferred to Hentziectypus)
- A. fordum (Caporiacco, 1954) (Transferred to Cryptachaea)
- A. fresno Levi, 1955 (Transferred to Cryptachaea)
- A. galeiforma Zhu, Zhang & Xu, 1991 (Transferred to Parasteatoda)
- A. geochares Levi, 1955 (Transferred to Cryptachaea)
- A. gibberosa (Kulczyński, 1899) (Transferred to Echinotheridion)
- A. gigantea (Keyserling, 1884) (Transferred to Cryptachaea)
- A. globosa (Hentz, 1850) (Transferred to Hentziectypus)
- A. guadalupensis (Keyserling, 1884) (Transferred to Cryptachaea)
- A. gui Zhu, 1998 (Transferred to Parasteatoda)
- A. hammeni Chrysanthus, 1963 (Transferred to Parasteatoda)
- A. herbigrada (Simon, 1873) (Transferred to Neottiura)
- A. hermosillo Levi, 1959 (Transferred to Hentziectypus)
- A. hirta (Taczanowski, 1873) (Transferred to Cryptachaea)
- A. ignota (Keyserling, 1884) (Transferred to Cryptachaea)
- A. index (Chamberlin & Ivie, 1944) (Transferred to Coleosoma)
- A. inops Levi, 1963 (Transferred to Cryptachaea)
- A. insulsa (Gertsch & Mulaik, 1936) (Transferred to Cryptachaea)
- A. isana Levi, 1963 (Transferred to Cryptachaea)
- A. japonica (Bösenberg & Strand, 1906) (Transferred to Parasteatoda)
- A. jequirituba Levi, 1963 (Transferred to Cryptachaea)
- A. jinghongensis Zhu, 1998 (Transferred to Parasteatoda)
- A. kaindi Levi, Lubin & Robinson, 1982 (Transferred to Parasteatoda)
- A. kaspi Levi, 1963 (Transferred to Cryptachaea)
- A. koepckei Levi, 1963 (Transferred to Cryptachaea)
- A. kompirensis (Bösenberg & Strand, 1906) (Transferred to Parasteatoda)
- A. krausi Chrysanthus, 1963 (Transferred to Parasteatoda)
- A. labarda Roberts, 1983 (Transferred to Bardala)
- A. lanyuensis Yoshida, Tso & Severinghaus, 2000 (Transferred to Parasteatoda)
- A. leguiai (Chamberlin, 1916) (Transferred to Theridion)
- A. liaoyuanensis Zhu & Yu, 1982 (Transferred to Theridion)
- A. longiducta Zhu, 1998 (Transferred to Parasteatoda)
- A. lota Levi, 1963 (Transferred to Cryptachaea)
- A. luculenta (Bryant, 1940) (Transferred to Chrysso)
- A. lunata (Clerck, 1757) (Transferred to Parasteatoda)
- A. lunata (Olivier, 1789) (Transferred to Parasteatoda)
- A. lunata (Franganillo, 1930) (Transferred to Parasteatoda)
- A. manzanillo Levi, 1959 (Transferred to Cryptachaea)
- A. maraca Buckup & Marques, 1991 (Transferred to Cryptachaea)
- A. maronica (Caporiacco, 1954) (Transferred to Cryptachaea)
- A. maxima (Keyserling, 1891) (Transferred to Cryptachaea)
- A. mea (Bösenberg & Strand, 1906) (Transferred to Campanicola)
- A. meraukensis Chrysanthus, 1963 (Transferred to Cryptachaea)
- A. mesax Levi, 1959 (Transferred to Parasteatoda)
- A. migrans (Keyserling, 1884) (Transferred to Cryptachaea)
- A. milagro Levi, 1963 (Transferred to Cryptachaea)
- A. mundula (L. Koch, 1872) (Transferred to Parasteatoda)
- A. nayaritensis Levi, 1959 (Transferred to Cryptachaea)
- A. nigrovittata (Keyserling, 1884) (Transferred to Parasteatoda)
- A. nipponica Yoshida, 1983 (Transferred to Parasteatoda)
- A. nordica (Chamberlin & Ivie, 1947) (Transferred to Chrysso)
- A. obnubila (Keyserling, 1891) (Transferred to Parasteatoda)
- A. oculiprominens (Saito, 1939) (Transferred to Parasteatoda)
- A. ohlerti (Thorell, 1870) (Transferred to Theridion)
- A. orana Levi, 1963 (Transferred to Cryptachaea)
- A. orgea Levi, 1967 (Transferred to Theridion)
- A. oxymaculata Zhu, 1998 (Transferred to Parasteatoda)
- A. pallida (Walckenaer, 1841) (Transferred to Parasteatoda)
- A. pallipera Levi, 1963 (Transferred to Cryptachaea)
- A. pallipes (Keyserling, 1891) (Transferred to Cryptachaea)
- A. parana Levi, 1963 (Transferred to Cryptachaea)
- A. passiva (Keyserling, 1891) (Transferred to Cryptachaea)
- A. picadoi (Banks, 1909) (Transferred to Parasteatoda)
- A. pilaton Levi, 1963 (Transferred to Cryptachaea)
- A. pinguis (Keyserling, 1886) (Transferred to Cryptachaea)
- A. polygramma (Kulczyński, 1911) (Transferred to Parasteatoda)
- A. porteri (Banks, 1896) (Transferred to Cryptachaea)
- A. portoricensis (Petrunkevitch, 1930) (Transferred to Cryptachaea)
- A. projectivulva Yoshida, 2001 (Transferred to Cryptachaea)
- A. pusillana (Roewer, 1942) (Transferred to Cryptachaea)
- A. pydanieli Buckup & Marques, 1991 (Transferred to Cryptachaea)
- A. quadrimaculata Yoshida, Tso & Severinghaus, 2000 (Transferred to Parasteatoda)
- A. quadripartita (Keyserling, 1891) (Transferred to Theridion)
- A. rafaeli Buckup & Marques, 1991 (Transferred to Hentziectypus)
- A. rapa Levi, 1963 (Transferred to Cryptachaea)
- A. redempta (Gertsch & Mulaik, 1936) (Transferred to Cryptachaea)
- A. rioensis Levi, 1963 (Transferred to Cryptachaea)
- A. riparia (Blackwall, 1834) (Transferred to Cryptachaea)
- A. rostra Zhu & Zhang, 1992 (Transferred to Cryptachaea)
- A. rupicola (Emerton, 1882) (Transferred to Cryptachaea)
- A. ryukyu Yoshida, 2000 (Transferred to Parasteatoda)
- A. salvadorensis (Kraus, 1955) (Transferred to Cryptachaea)
- A. saxatilis (C. L. Koch, 1835) (Transferred to Cryptachaea)
- A. schneirlai Levi, 1959 (Transferred to Cryptachaea)
- A. schraderorum Levi, 1959 (Transferred to Cryptachaea)
- A. schullei (Gertsch & Mulaik, 1936) (Transferred to Hentziectypus)
- A. serax Levi, 1959 (Transferred to Hentziectypus)
- A. serenoae (Gertsch & Archer, 1942) (Transferred to Cryptachaea)
- A. serica (Urquhart, 1886) (Transferred to Steatoda)
- A. sicki Levi, 1963 (Transferred to Cryptachaea)
- A. simulans (Thorell, 1875) (Transferred to Parasteatoda)
- A. simulata (Emerton, 1926) (Transferred to Theridion)
- A. songi Zhu, 1998 (Transferred to Parasteatoda)
- A. subtabulata Zhu, 1998 (Transferred to Parasteatoda)
- A. subvexa Zhu, 1998 (Transferred to Parasteatoda)
- A. tabulata Levi, 1980 (Transferred to Parasteatoda)
- A. taeniata (Keyserling, 1884) (Transferred to Cryptachaea)
- A. taim Buckup & Marques, 2006 (Transferred to Cryptachaea)
- A. teja Levi, 1967 (Transferred to Cryptachaea)
- A. tepidariorum (C. L. Koch, 1841) (Transferred to Parasteatoda)
- A. terex Levi, 1959 (Transferred to Parasteatoda)
- A. tesselata (Keyserling, 1884) (Transferred to Parasteatoda)
- A. tovarensis Levi, 1963 (Transferred to Cryptachaea)
- A. transipora (Zhu & Zhang, 1992) (Transferred to Parasteatoda)
- A. triangula Yoshida, 1993 (Transferred to Parasteatoda)
- A. triguttata (Keyserling, 1891) (Transferred to Cryptachaea)
- A. trinidensis Levi, 1959 (Transferred to Cryptachaea)
- A. turquino Levi, 1959 (Transferred to Hentziectypus)
- A. umbratica (L. Koch, 1872) (Transferred to Theridion)
- A. undata (Keyserling, 1884) (Transferred to Cryptachaea)
- A. ungilensis Kim & Kim, 1996 (Transferred to Parasteatoda)
- A. uviana Levi, 1963 (Transferred to Cryptachaea)
- A. valoka Chrysanthus, 1975 (Transferred to Parasteatoda)
- A. veruculata (Urquhart, 1886) (Transferred to Cryptachaea)
- A. vervoorti Chrysanthus, 1975 (Transferred to Parasteatoda)
- A. vivida (Keyserling, 1891) (Transferred to Cryptachaea)
- A. wau Levi, Lubin & Robinson, 1982 (Transferred to Parasteatoda)
- A. xinjiangensis Hu & Wu, 1989 (Transferred to Heterotheridion)
- A. zonensis Levi, 1959 (Transferred to Cryptachaea)

In synonymy:

- A. pentagona (Caporiacco, 1954) = Achaearanea hieroglyphica (Mello-Leitão, 1940)

Nomen dubium

- A. quadripunctata (Simon, 1895)
