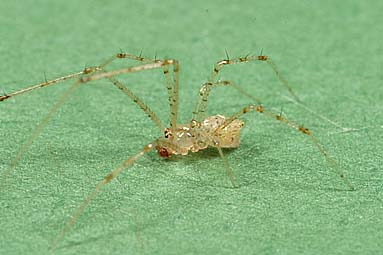
- male C. pulcherrima
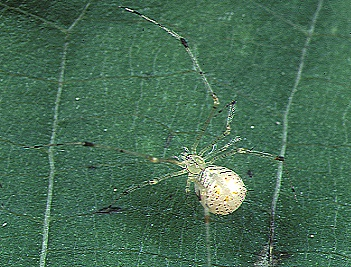
- female C. spiniventris

Scientific classification
- Kingdom: Animalia
- Phylum: Arthropoda
- Subphylum: Chelicerata
- Class: Arachnida
- Order: Araneae
- Infraorder: Araneomorphae
- Family: Theridiidae
- Genus: Chrysso; O. Pickard-Cambridge, 1882

Type species
- C. albomaculata O. Pickard-Cambridge, 1882

Species
- 64, see text

Synonyms
- Arctachaea Levi, 1957; Argyroaster Yaginuma, 1958

= Chrysso =

Golden comb-footed spider Temporal range: Neogene– Present

Genus of spiders

Chrysso is a genus of comb-footed spiders that was first described by Octavius Pickard-Cambridge in 1882.

C. pulcherrima is pantropical, C. spiniventris has been introduced to Europe, and C. nordica occurs both in North America and in Asia from Hungary to Mongolia.

== Description ==
Many species are strikingly colored, but like most theridiids, the coloration is variable. C. compressa has a striking black sternum and abdomen, but the venter of Brazilian species is black, while those of Peru are yellow. C. venusta has been observed to rapidly change its color when disturbed.

Females are about 9 millimetres (0.35 in) long, and have blade-like hairs on the tip of the abdomen.

== Species ==
As of May 2020 it contains sixty-four species, mostly found in the Americas and Asia. It also contains 2 extinct species:

- C. albomaculata O. Pickard-Cambridge, 1882 (type) – USA, Caribbean to Brazil
- C. alecula Levi, 1962 – Panama
- C. anei Barrion & Litsinger, 1995 – Philippines
- C. angula (Tikader, 1970) – India
- C. antonio Levi, 1962 – Brazil
- C. arima Levi, 1962 – Trinidad
- C. arops Levi, 1962 – Brazil
- C. backstromi (Berland, 1924) – Chile (Juan Fernandez Is.)
- C. barrosmachadoi Caporiacco, 1955 – Venezuela
- C. bicuspidata Zhang & Zhang, 2012 – China
- C. bifurca Zhang & Zhang, 2012 – China
- C. bimaculata Yoshida, 1998 – China, Japan
- C. calima Buckup & Marques, 1992 – Brazil
- C. cambridgei (Petrunkevitch, 1911) – Mexico to Venezuela
- C. caudigera Yoshida, 1993 – China, Taiwan
- C. compressa (Keyserling, 1884) – Peru, Brazil
- C. cyclocera Zhu, 1998 – China
- C. dentaria Gao & Li, 2014 – China
- C. diplosticha Chamberlin & Ivie, 1936 – Panama to Peru
- C. ecuadorensis Levi, 1957 – Colombia to Bolivia
- C. fanjingshan Song, Zhang & Zhu, 2006 – China
- C. foliata (L. Koch, 1878) – Russia (Far East), China, Korea, Japan
- C. gounellei Levi, 1962 – Brazil
- C. hejunhuai Barrion, Barrion-Dupo & Heong, 2013 – China
- C. huae Tang, Yin & Peng, 2003 – China
- C. huanuco Levi, 1957 – Peru
- C. hyoshidai Barrion, Barrion-Dupo & Heong, 2013 – China
- C. indicifera Chamberlin & Ivie, 1936 – Panama to Peru
- C. intervales Gonzaga, Leiner & Santos, 2006 – Brazil
- C. isumbo Barrion & Litsinger, 1995 – Philippines
- C. lativentris Yoshida, 1993 – China, Korea, Taiwan
- C. lingchuanensis Zhu & Zhang, 1992 – China
- C. longshanensis Yin, 2012 – China
- C. mariae Levi, 1957 – Peru
- C. melba Levi, 1962 – Panama
- C. nigriceps Keyserling, 1884 – Colombia, Ecuador
- C. nigrosterna Keyserling, 1891 – Brazil
- C. nordica (Chamberlin & Ivie, 1947) – France, Hungary, Ukraine, Russia (Europe to Far East), Kazakhstan, Mongolia, North America
- C. orchis Yoshida, Tso & Severinghaus, 2000 – Taiwan
- C. oxycera Zhu & Song, 1993 – China
- C. pelyx (Levi, 1957) – USA
- C. pulchra (Keyserling, 1891) – Brazil
- C. questona Levi, 1962 – Costa Rica, Panama, Trinidad
- C. rubrovittata (Keyserling, 1884) – Brazil, Argentina
- C. sasakii Yoshida, 2001 – Japan
- C. scintillans (Thorell, 1895) – Myanmar, India, China, Korea, Japan, Philippines
- C. sicki Levi, 1957 – Brazil
- C. silva Levi, 1962 – Panama
- C. simoni Levi, 1962 – Venezuela
- C. subrapula Zhu, 1998 – China
- C. sulcata (Keyserling, 1884) – Peru, Bolivia, Brazil
- C. tiboli Barrion & Litsinger, 1995 – Philippines
- C. trimaculata Zhu, Zhang & Xu, 1991 – China, Taiwan, Thailand
- C. trispinula Zhu, 1998 – China
- C. urbasae (Tikader, 1970) – India
- C. vallensis Levi, 1957 – Panama
- C. vexabilis Keyserling, 1884 – Panama to Argentina
- C. viridiventris Yoshida, 1996 – Taiwan, Japan (Ryukyu Is.)
- C. vitra Zhu, 1998 – China
- C. vittatula (Roewer, 1942) – Colombia to Bolivia
- C. volcanensis Levi, 1962 – Costa Rica, Panama
- C. wangi Zhu, 1998 – China
- C. wenxianensis Zhu, 1998 – China
- C. yulingu Barrion, Barrion-Dupo & Heong, 2013 – China
- †C. conspicua Wunderlich, 1988 – Dominican Amber – Miocene
- †C. dubia Wunderlich, 1988 – Dominican Amber – Miocene

Formerly included:

- C. acrobeles (Thorell, 1895) (Transferred to Coleosoma)
- C. albipes (Saito, 1935) (Transferred to Chikunia)
- C. argyrodiformis (Yaginuma, 1952) (Transferred to Meotipa)
- C. conigerum (Simon, 1914) (Transferred to Achaeridion)
- C. jianglensis Zhu & Song, 1993 (Transferred to Meotipa)
- C. maronica Caporiacco, 1954 (Transferred to Cryptachaea)
- C. octomaculata (Bösenberg & Strand, 1906) (Transferred to Coleosoma)
- C. pentagona Caporiacco, 1954 (Transferred to Achaearanea)
- C. picturata (Simon, 1895) (Transferred to Meotipa)
- C. rapula (Yaginuma, 1960) (Transferred to Chikunia)
- C. shimenensis Tang, Yin & Peng, 2003 (Transferred to Thwaitesia)
- C. sikkimensis (Tikader, 1970) (Transferred to Linyphia)
- C. vesiculosa (Simon, 1895) (Transferred to Meotipa)
