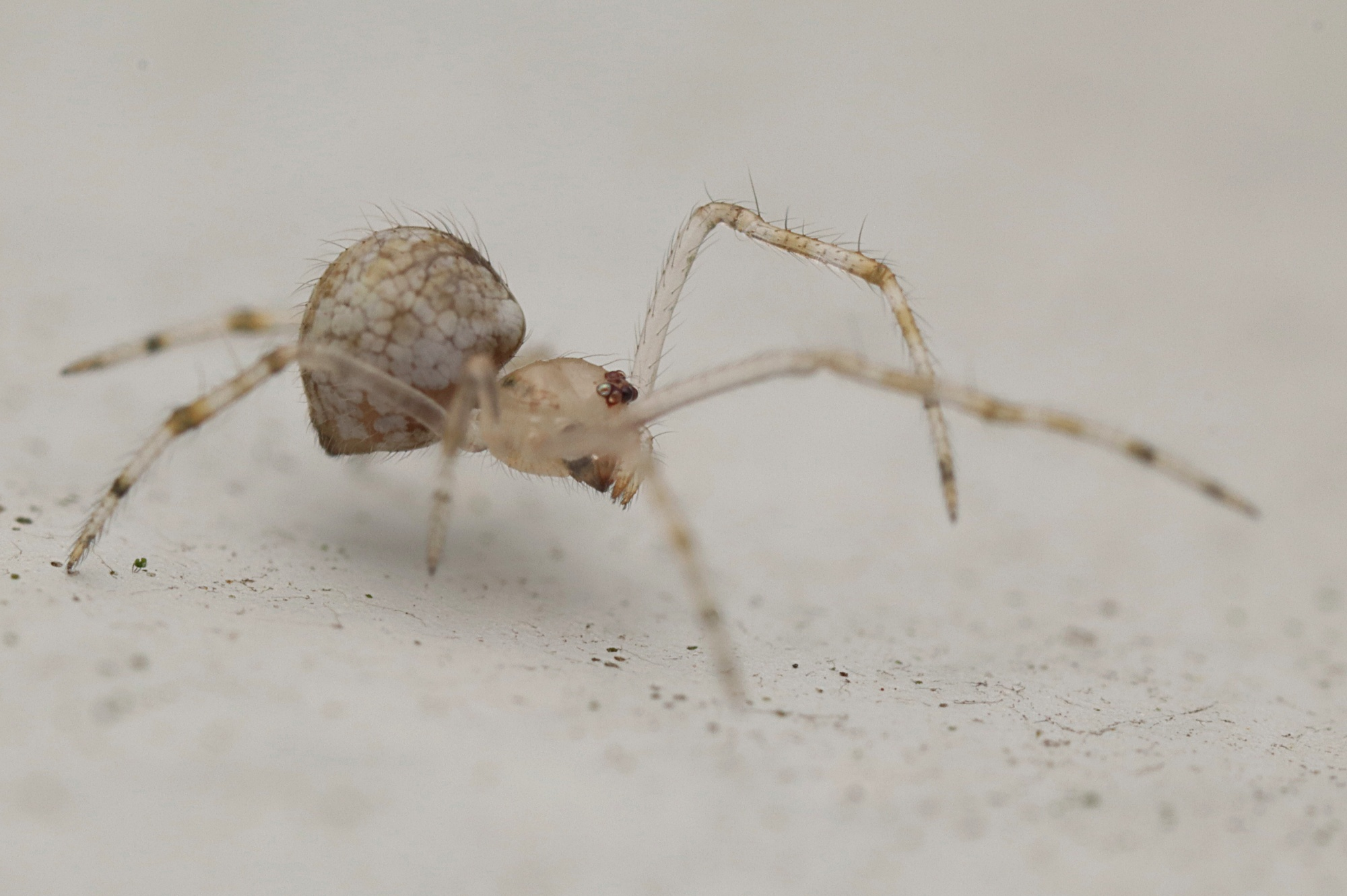

Scientific classification
- Domain: Eukaryota
- Kingdom: Animalia
- Phylum: Arthropoda
- Subphylum: Chelicerata
- Class: Arachnida
- Order: Araneae
- Infraorder: Araneomorphae
- Family: Theridiidae
- Genus: Cryptachaea
- Species: C. gigantipes

Binomial name
- Cryptachaea gigantipes (Keyserling, 1890)

= Cryptachaea gigantipes =

Australasian species of spider

Cryptachaea gigantipes, known vernacularly as the white porch spider, is a species of cobweb spider in the family Theridiidae. It is native to south-eastern Australia and is an introduced species in New Zealand.

== Taxonomy ==
The species was first described by Eugen von Keyserling in 1890, in his German language text Die Arachniden Australiens, nach der Natur beschrieben und abgebildet. The species is most closely related to Cryptachaea veruculata, and more distantly related to Cryptachaea blattea.

== Description ==
The species ranges from amber to creamy white in colour, typically with dark-coloured spots. The species measures 6.1mm in total length.

== Distribution and habitat ==
The species is found in eastern Australia, Norfolk Island and New Zealand. Common in south-eastern Australia, the species was first documented in New Zealand in the year 2000, but may have been present in the country since the 1980s. The species is typically found in rocky areas or caves, or in sheltered eaves or porches of human habitats.

== Gallery ==
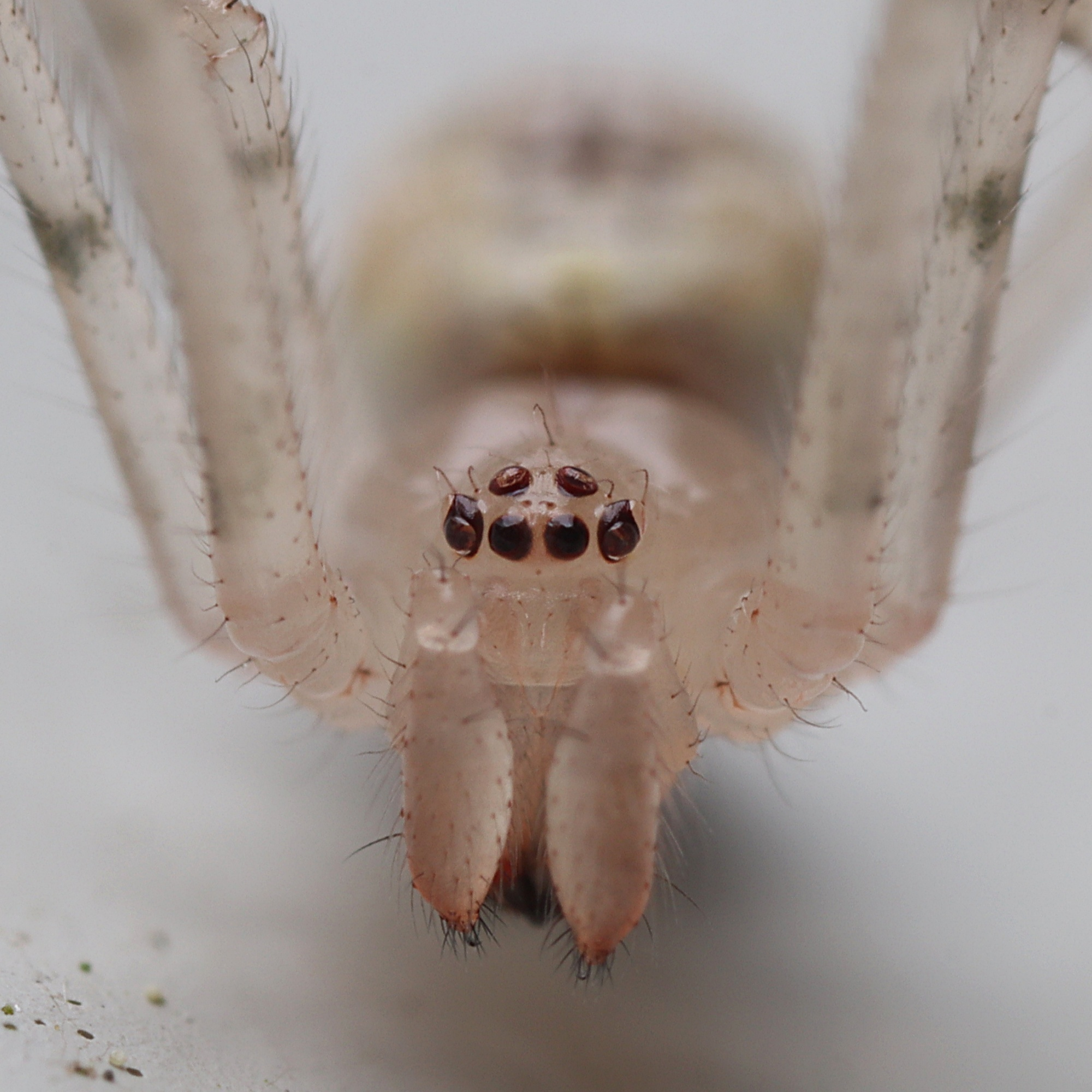
Close-up of the face of Cryptachaea gigantipes

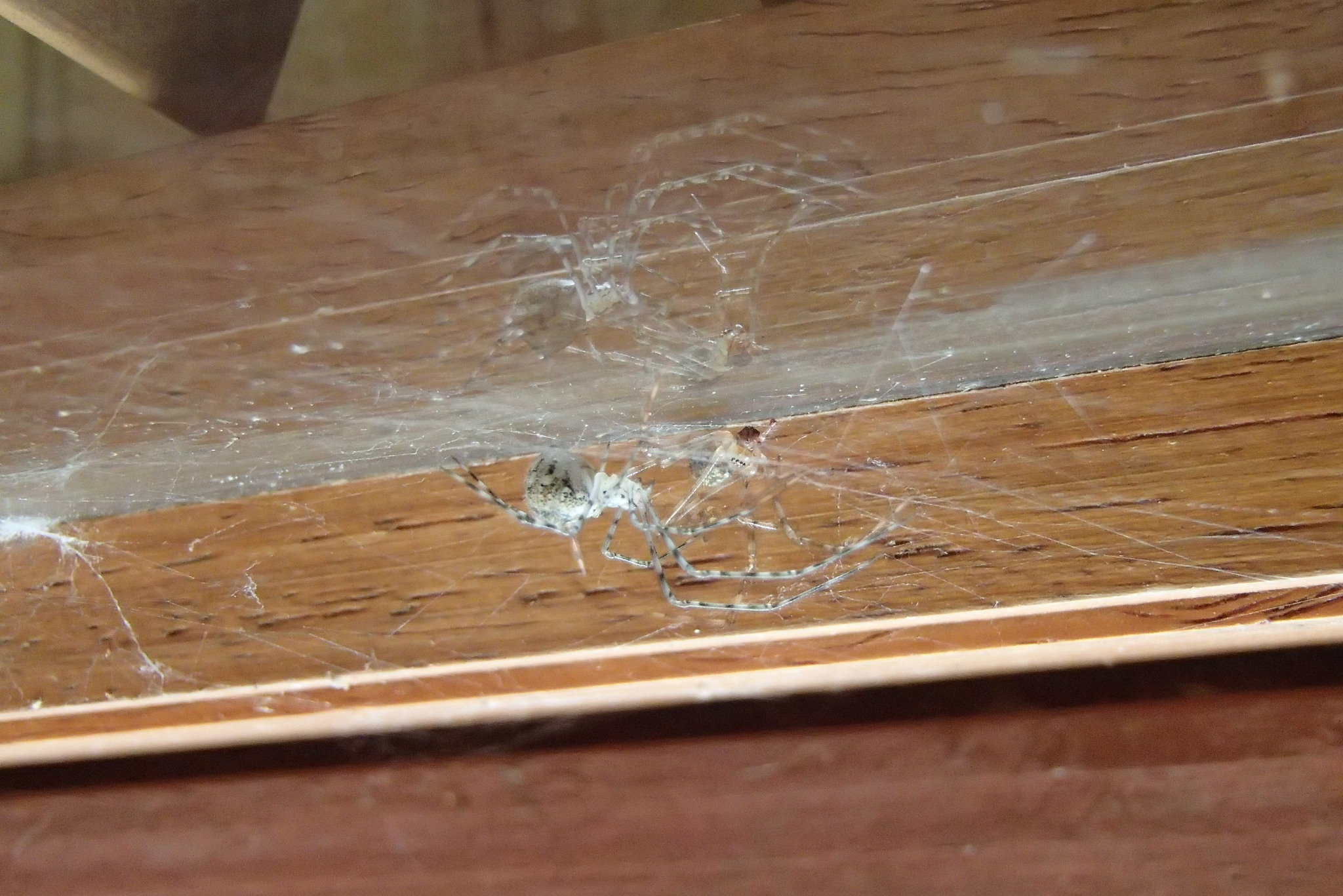
Cryptachaea gigantipes and cobweb outside of a home in Wentworth Falls, New South Wales
