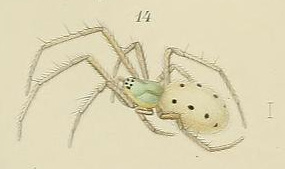
- female from 1906 description
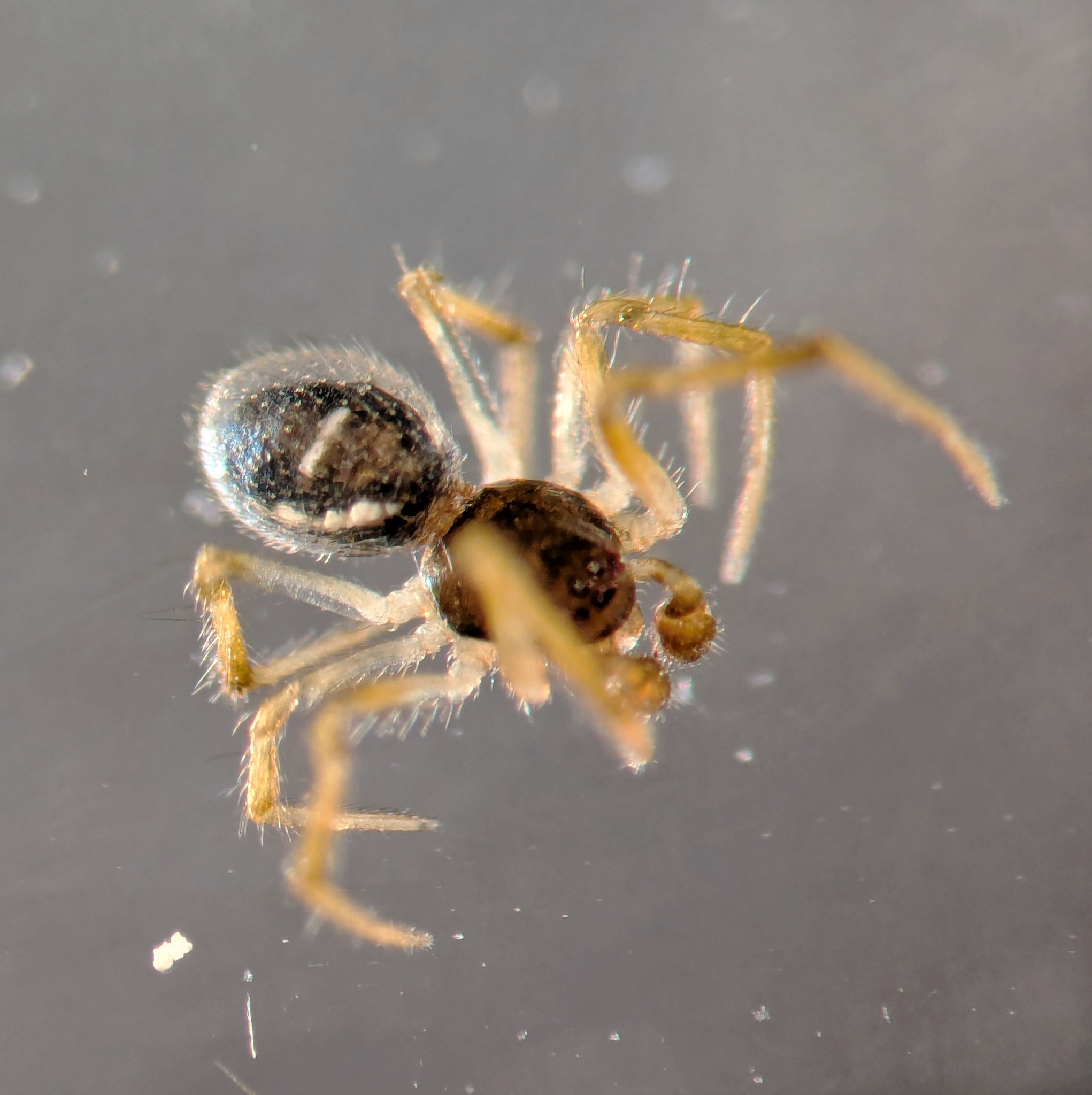
- male from New Zealand

Scientific classification
- Kingdom: Animalia
- Phylum: Arthropoda
- Subphylum: Chelicerata
- Class: Arachnida
- Order: Araneae
- Infraorder: Araneomorphae
- Family: Theridiidae
- Genus: Coleosoma
- Species: C. octomaculatum

Binomial name
- Coleosoma octomaculatum (Bösenberg & Strand, 1906)

Synonyms
- Theridion octomaculatum Bösenberg & Strand, 1906; Chrysso octomaculata (Bösenberg & Strand, 1906)

= Coleosoma octomaculatum =

Species of spider

Coleosoma octomaculatum is a species of spider in the family Theridiidae. It is native to East Asia and has been introduced to New Zealand.

== Etymology ==
The species name octomaculatum is derived from Latin octo (eight) and maculatum (spotted), referring to the eight spots visible on the female's opisthosoma.

== Taxonomy ==
The species was originally described by Wilhelm Bösenberg and Embrik Strand in 1906 as Theridion octomaculatum. It was later transferred to the genus Coleosoma by Yoshida in 1982, then to Chrysso by the same author in 2009, before being returned to Coleosoma by Sirvid and Fitzgerald in 2016. The transfer back to Coleosoma was based on the presence of a sheathed anteroventral portion of the male opisthosoma and similarity of male palp morphology.

Sirvid and Fitzgerald suggest that C. octomaculatum belongs to a "floridanum group" within Coleosoma, characterized by a more strongly sclerotized epigyne with distinct vulva, short copulatory ducts, large spermathecae, and an embolus spiral forming a half circle, in contrast to the "blandum group" which has weakly sclerotized epigynes and embolus spirals forming almost complete circles.

== Distribution ==
C. octomaculatum is native to China, Korea, Taiwan, and Japan. It was first recorded from New Zealand in 2016, where numerous specimens collected between 1996 and 2007 suggest it has become established as an introduced species. The species is also recorded from the Philippines.

== Habitat ==
The species is frequently found in high humidity environments such as rice fields and watersides. It has been collected from various habitats including vegetation and dead leaves.

== Description ==
C. octomaculatum is a small spider with females measuring 2.0–3.0 mm in body length and males about 2.0 mm.

=== Female ===
The female has a round carapace that is longer than wide, with a turbid yellow coloration. The head region is slightly elevated, while the thoracic region displays blackish brown bands at the middle and both sides. Eight small eyes are arranged on black eye tubercles in two rows. The chelicerae have small teeth or no teeth. The Opisthosoma is oval and longer than wide, with a turbid yellow dorsum featuring four pairs of black spots on each side – the characteristic feature that gives the species its name. The epigyne has a longitudinal dark midline at the center, with a pair of oval spermathecae above the midline.

=== Male ===
Males are similar to females but smaller, with a darker body coloration and longer, well-developed legs. The abdomen is cylindrical with a dorsum displaying three pairs of long and short black stripes on each side. Males have an enlarged epigastric region and distinctive pedipalps with complex structures including an embolus with a broad base and pointed tip.

== Behavior ==
Females carry their egg sacs attached to the spinnerets and supported by one hind leg, which is an unusual habit within the Theridiidae family. Egg sacs contain 7–19 eggs or hatchlings, with an average of around 10 eggs per sac.
