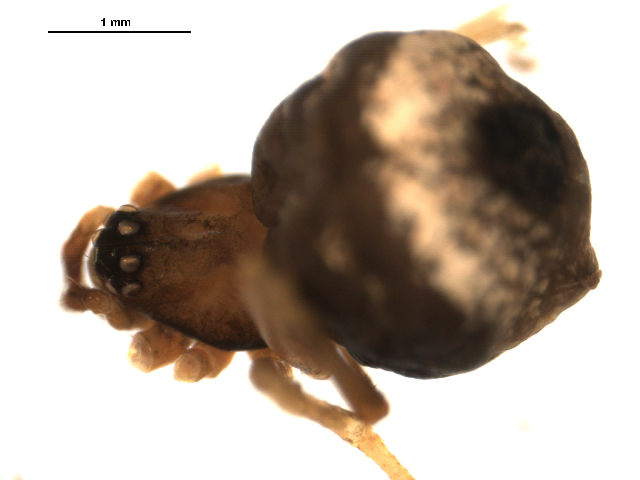
- H. globosus, adult female

Scientific classification
- Kingdom: Animalia
- Phylum: Arthropoda
- Subphylum: Chelicerata
- Class: Arachnida
- Order: Araneae
- Infraorder: Araneomorphae
- Family: Theridiidae
- Genus: Hentziectypus; Archer, 1946

Type species
- H. globosus (Hentz, 1850)

Species
- 12, see text

= Hentziectypus =

Genus of spiders

Hentziectypus is a genus of comb-footed spiders that was first described by Allan Frost Archer in 1946. Originally placed with Theridion, it was moved to Achaearanea in 1955, and to its own genus in 2008. These spiders most resemble members of Cryptachaea, but are distinguished by a median apophysis that is broadly attached to the tegulum. Spiders of Parasteatoda have a median apophysis attached to the embolus, while those of Achaearanea have a hooked paracymbium on the pedipalps of males.

== Species ==
As of September 2019 it contains twelve species, found in the Americas and in the Caribbean, including Cuba, Jamaica, Panama, and Bermuda:

- Hentziectypus annus (Levi, 1959) – Jamaica, Bermuda
- Hentziectypus apex (Levi, 1959) – Panama
- Hentziectypus conjunctus (Gertsch & Mulaik, 1936) – USA, Canada
- Hentziectypus florendidus (Levi, 1959) – USA to Venezuela
- Hentziectypus florens (O. Pickard-Cambridge, 1896) – USA to Panama, Cuba
- Hentziectypus globosus (Hentz, 1850) (type) – North America
- Hentziectypus hermosillo (Levi, 1959) – Mexico
- Hentziectypus rafaeli (Buckup & Marques, 1991) – Bolivia, Brazil
- Hentziectypus schullei (Gertsch & Mulaik, 1936) – USA, Mexico
- Hentziectypus serax (Levi, 1959) – Mexico
- Hentziectypus tayrona Buckup, Marques & Rodrigues, 2012 – Colombia
- Hentziectypus turquino (Levi, 1959) – Cuba

In synonymy:

- H. credulus (Gertsch & Davis, 1936) = Hentziectypus schullei (Gertsch & Mulaik, 1936)
- H. mendax (O. Pickard-Cambridge, 1899) = Hentziectypus florens (O. Pickard-Cambridge, 1896)
