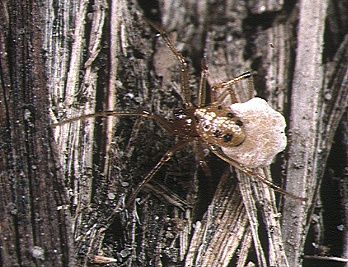

Scientific classification
- Kingdom: Animalia
- Phylum: Arthropoda
- Subphylum: Chelicerata
- Class: Arachnida
- Order: Araneae
- Infraorder: Araneomorphae
- Family: Theridiidae
- Genus: Coleosoma
- Species: C. floridanum

Binomial name
- Coleosoma floridanum Banks, 1900

= Coleosoma floridanum =

Species of spider

Coleosoma floridanum is a species of cobweb spider in the family Theridiidae.

== Distribution ==
It is found in North, Central and South America, has been introduced into Europe, Macaronesia, West Africa, the Seychelles, and the Pacific Islands.

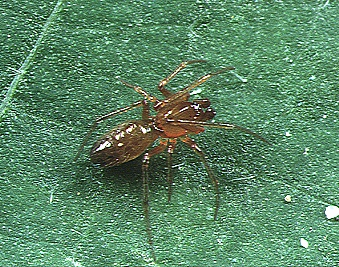
