= Campanicola ferrumequina =

Scientific classification
- Kingdom: Animalia
- Phylum: Arthropoda
- Subphylum: Chelicerata
- Class: Arachnida
- Order: Araneae
- Infraorder: Araneomorphae
- Family: Theridiidae
- Genus: Campanicola
- Species: C. ferrumequina

Binomial name
- Campanicola ferrumequina (Bösenberg & Strand, 1906)

Species of spider

Campanicola ferrumequina is a species of comb-footed spider in the family Theridiidae. It is found in China, Korea, and Japan.
