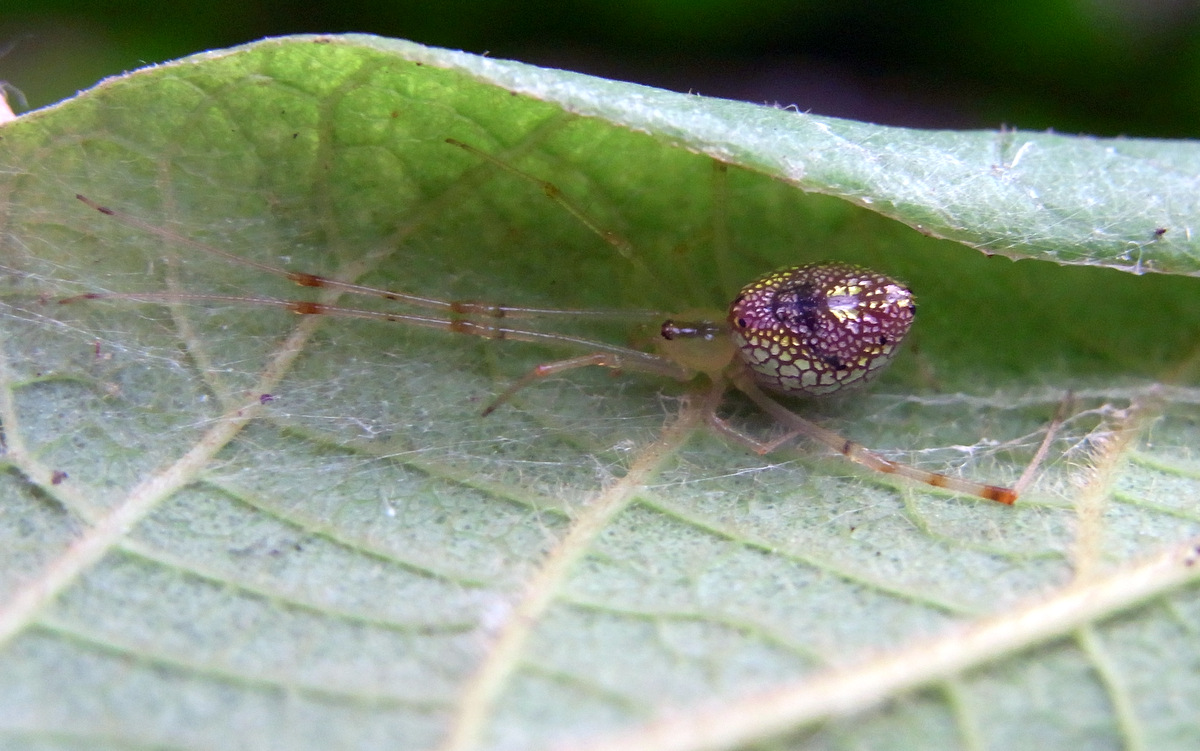
- Spider on a leaf, Chatswood West, Australia

Scientific classification
- Kingdom: Animalia
- Phylum: Arthropoda
- Subphylum: Chelicerata
- Class: Arachnida
- Order: Araneae
- Infraorder: Araneomorphae
- Family: Theridiidae
- Genus: Thwaitesia
- Species: T. argentiopunctata

Binomial name
- Thwaitesia argentiopunctata Rainbow 1916

= Thwaitesia argentiopunctata =

Species of spider

Thwaitesia argentiopunctata, also known as the sequinned spider, mirror spider, or twin-peaked Thwaitesia, is a species of spider found in all states of Australia, most frequently in Queensland. It was firstly discovered by George Henry Kendrick Thwaites in 1916, firstly described as an Argyrodes species.

The body length ranges from 1.5 mm (0.059 in) to 7 mm (0.28 in). The legs are long and slim. The abdomen is patterned with cream, green, yellow, and red. These patches on their abdomens are composed of reflective guanine and can change size if the spider is threatened.

Mirror spiders live for roughly one year, and like many spiders tend to be solitary in nature. One spider typically gives birth to 40 spiderlings. They typically eat smaller insects, particularly mosquitoes, flies, and gnats. They can be preyed upon by larger animals such as larger spiders, scorpions, and some larger vertebrates.
