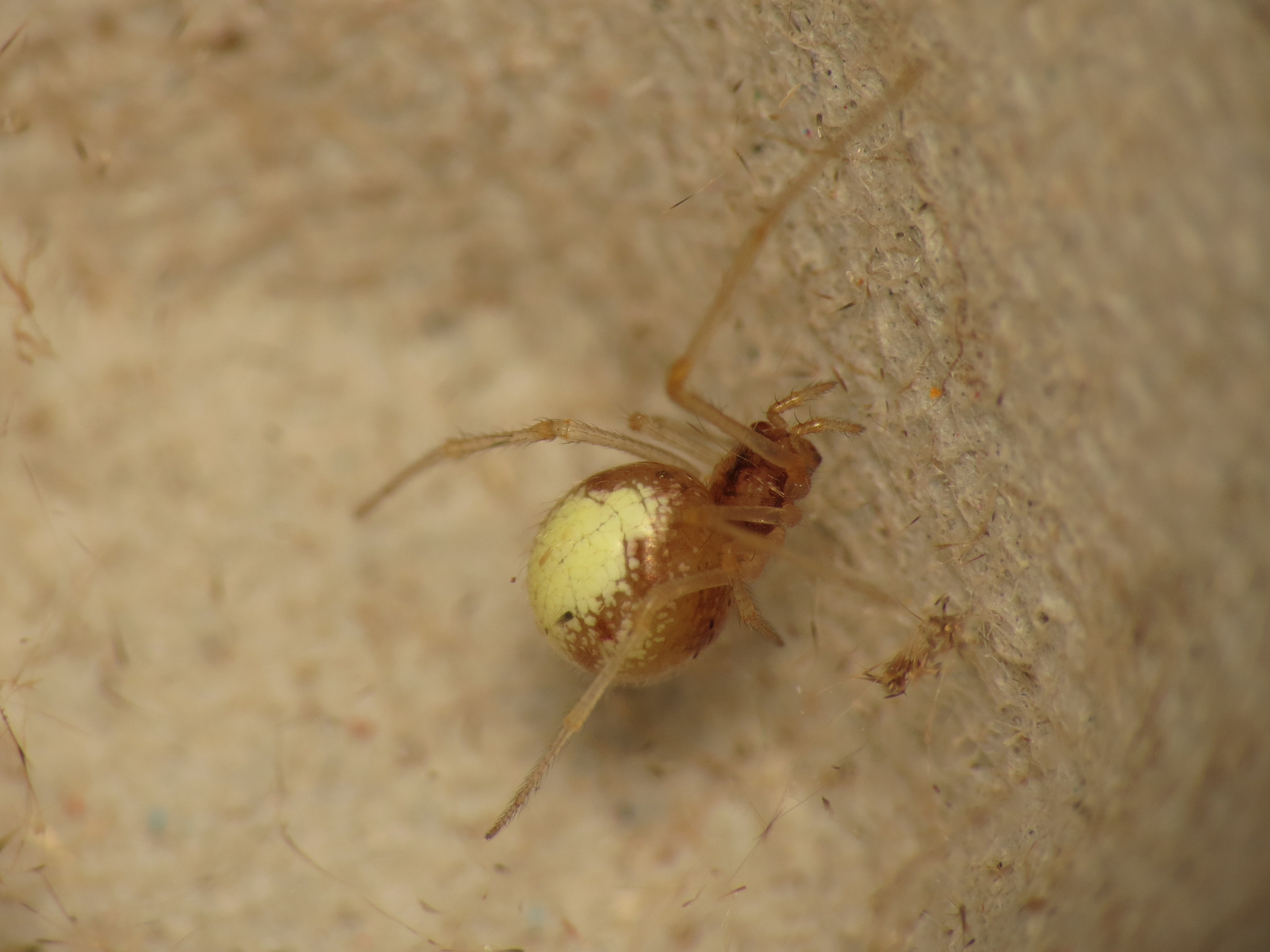

Scientific classification
- Kingdom: Animalia
- Phylum: Arthropoda
- Subphylum: Chelicerata
- Class: Arachnida
- Order: Araneae
- Infraorder: Araneomorphae
- Family: Theridiidae
- Genus: Neottiura
- Species: N. bimaculata

Binomial name
- Neottiura bimaculata (Linnaeus, 1767)

= Neottiura bimaculata =

Species of spider

Neottiura bimaculata is a species of cobweb spider in the family Theridiidae. It is found in North America, Europe, Turkey, Caucasus, Russia (Siberia), Central Asia, China, and Japan.

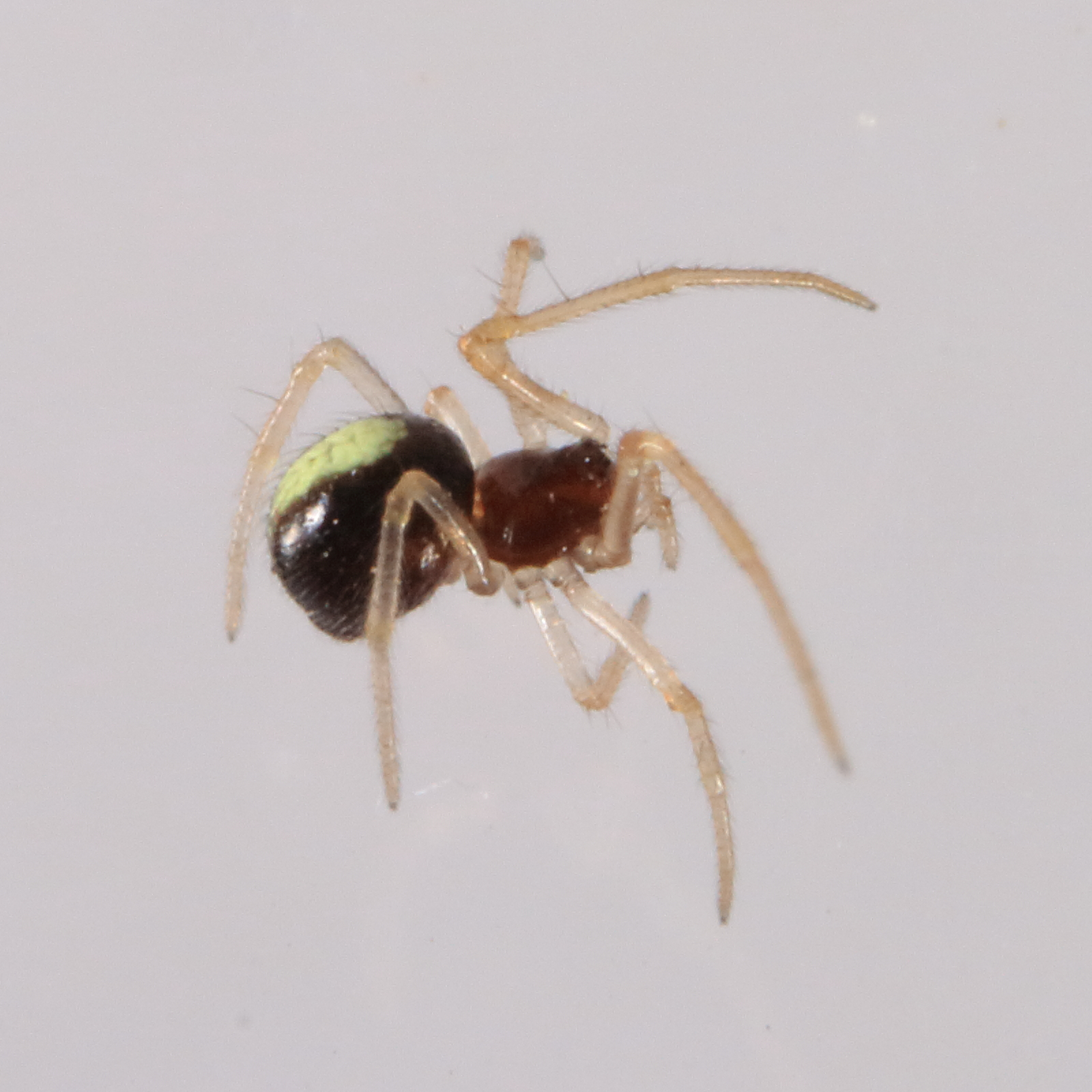

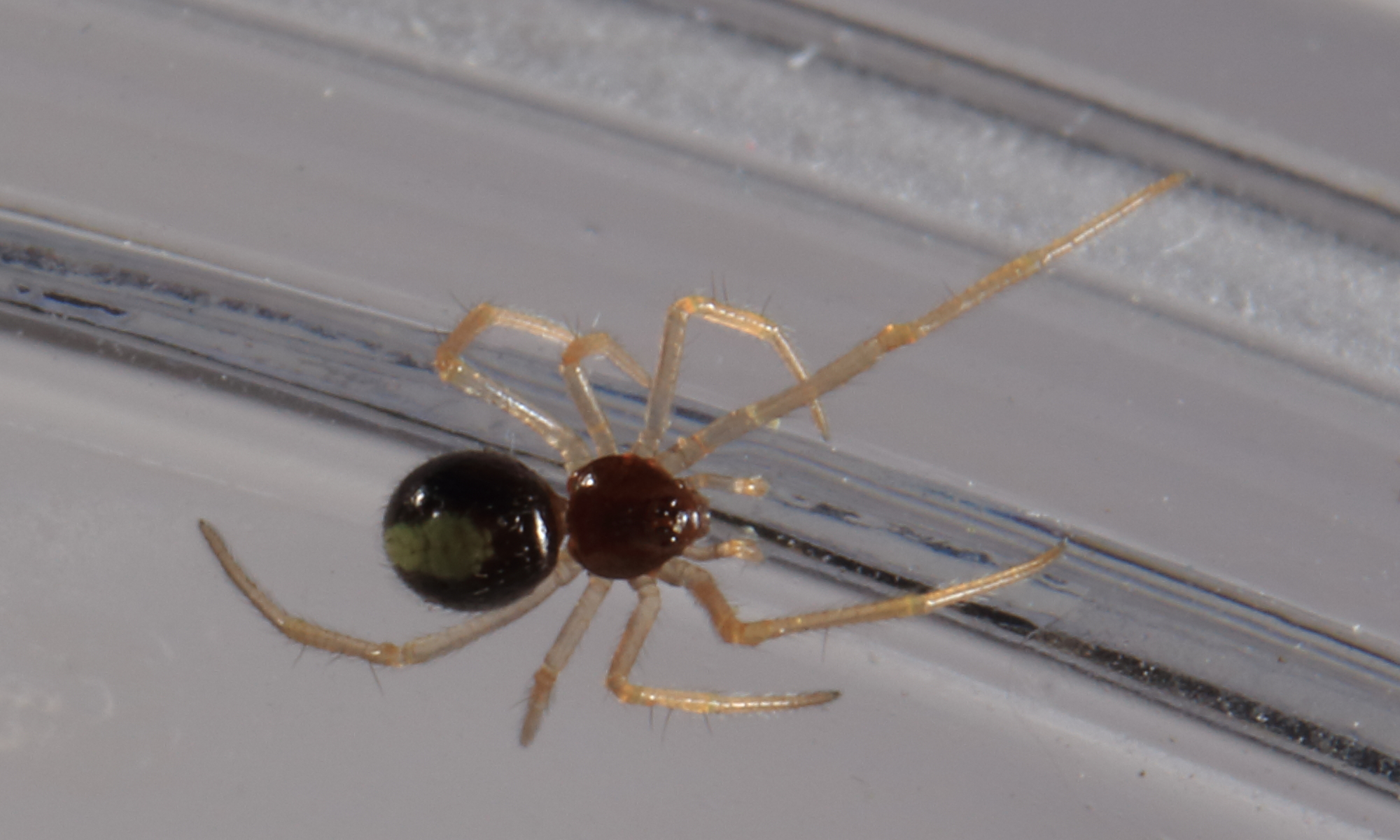

== Subspecies ==
These two subspecies belong to the species Neottiura bimaculata:

- (Neottiura bimaculata bimaculata) (Linnaeus, 1767)
- Neottiura bimaculata pellucida (Simon, 1873)
