= Hentziectypus tayrona =

Scientific classification
- Domain: Eukaryota
- Kingdom: Animalia
- Phylum: Arthropoda
- Subphylum: Chelicerata
- Class: Arachnida
- Order: Araneae
- Infraorder: Araneomorphae
- Family: Theridiidae
- Genus: Hentziectypus
- Species: H. tayrona

Binomial name
- Hentziectypus tayrona Buckup, Marques, & Rodrigues, 2012

Species of spider

Hentziectypus tayrona is a species of comb-footed spider in the family Theridiidae. It is found in Colombia.
