= Achaearanea hieroglyphica =

Scientific classification
- Kingdom: Animalia
- Phylum: Arthropoda
- Subphylum: Chelicerata
- Class: Arachnida
- Order: Araneae
- Infraorder: Araneomorphae
- Family: Theridiidae
- Genus: Achaearanea
- Species: A. hieroglyphica

Binomial name
- Achaearanea hieroglyphica (Mello-Leitão, 1940)

Synonyms
- Achaea hieroglyphica Mello-Leitão, 1940; Chrysso pentagona Caporiacco, 1954; Achaearanea pentagona Levi, 1962: 211; Achaearanea hieroglyphica — Levi, 1967

Species of spider

Achaearanea hieroglyphica is a tangle web spider species found in Brazil, French Guiana and Peru.
