= Cryptachaea pusillana =

Scientific classification
- Kingdom: Animalia
- Phylum: Arthropoda
- Subphylum: Chelicerata
- Class: Arachnida
- Order: Araneae
- Infraorder: Araneomorphae
- Family: Theridiidae
- Genus: Cryptachaea
- Species: C. pusillana

Binomial name
- Cryptachaea pusillana (Roewer, 1942)

Synonyms
- Theridion pusillum Keyserling 1884 [nec T. pusillum (Wider, 1834)]; Theridion pusilanum Roewer, 1942 [nom. nov. pro T. pusillum Keyserling]; Achaearanea pusillana — Levi, 1963; Cryptachaea pusillana — Yoshida, 2008

Species of spider

Cryptachaea pusillana is a species of tangle web spider, family Theridiidae. It is only known from French Guiana.
