= Campanicola campanulata =

Scientific classification
- Domain: Eukaryota
- Kingdom: Animalia
- Phylum: Arthropoda
- Subphylum: Chelicerata
- Class: Arachnida
- Order: Araneae
- Infraorder: Araneomorphae
- Family: Theridiidae
- Genus: Campanicola
- Species: C. campanulata

Binomial name
- Campanicola campanulata (Chen, 1993)

Species of spider

Campanicola campanulata is a species of comb-footed spider in the family Theridiidae. It is found in China.
