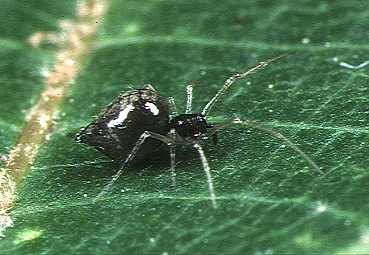
- female from Okinawa
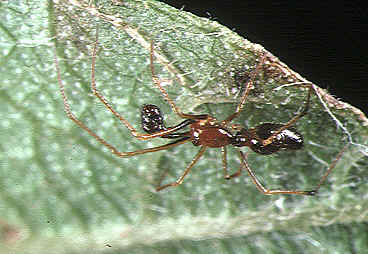
- male from Okinawa

Scientific classification
- Kingdom: Animalia
- Phylum: Arthropoda
- Subphylum: Chelicerata
- Class: Arachnida
- Order: Araneae
- Infraorder: Araneomorphae
- Family: Theridiidae
- Genus: Coleosoma
- Species: C. blandum

Binomial name
- Coleosoma blandum O. Pickard-Cambridge, 1882

Synonyms
- Theridion acrobeles Thorell, 1895; Theridion conutum Thorell, 1895; Theridion vituperabile Petrunkevitch, 1911

= Coleosoma blandum =

Species of spider

Coleosoma blandum is a species of cobweb spider in the family Theridiidae. It has a widespread distribution across Asia, from India and Sri Lanka through Southeast Asia to East Asia, including China and Japan. The species has also been introduced to the Seychelles and Hawaii.

== Taxonomy ==
The species was first described by O. Pickard-Cambridge in 1882 from a male specimen collected in Sri Lanka (then Ceylon). The species was initially placed in the genus Theridion by some authors, but was transferred to Coleosoma by Levi in 1959.

Two species described by Thorell in 1895 from Myanmar, Theridion acrobeles and T. conutum, are now considered junior synonyms of C. blandum.

== Distribution ==
C. blandum is widely distributed across Asia, with records from India, Sri Lanka, Bangladesh, Myanmar, Thailand, Philippines, China, and Japan. In Japan, it occurs on Honshu, Kyushu, and the Ryukyu Islands (including Amami Ōshima, Okinawa Island, Iriomote Island, Ishigaki Island, and Yonaguni). The species has been introduced to the Seychelles and Hawaii. There are also multiple finds from Réunion.

== Habitat ==
C. blandum is commonly found in agricultural areas and is considered a beneficial predator in rice fields throughout Southeast Asia.

== Description ==
C. blandum is a small spider with females measuring 2.0-2.8 mm and males 1.9-2.6 mm in body length. The carapace and abdomen are black, while the legs are yellowish-white with black rings on the tips of the tarsal segments and base of the metatarsal segments of the fourth legs.

The male is distinguished by its greatly enlarged and swollen abdomen with a distinctive sac-like posterior portion. The female can be identified by multiple thread-like protrusions that emerge from the abdomen. Both sexes have a large yellowish-white spot in the center of the dorsal surface of the abdomen.
