= Coleosoma africanum =

Scientific classification
- Kingdom: Animalia
- Phylum: Arthropoda
- Subphylum: Chelicerata
- Class: Arachnida
- Order: Araneae
- Infraorder: Araneomorphae
- Family: Theridiidae
- Genus: Coleosoma
- Species: C. africanum

Binomial name
- Coleosoma africanum Schmidt, Krause, 1995

Species of spider

Coleosoma africanum is a species of spiders of the family Theridiidae that is endemic in Cape Verde. The species was first described by Günter E. W. Schmidt and Rolf Harald Krause in 1995.
