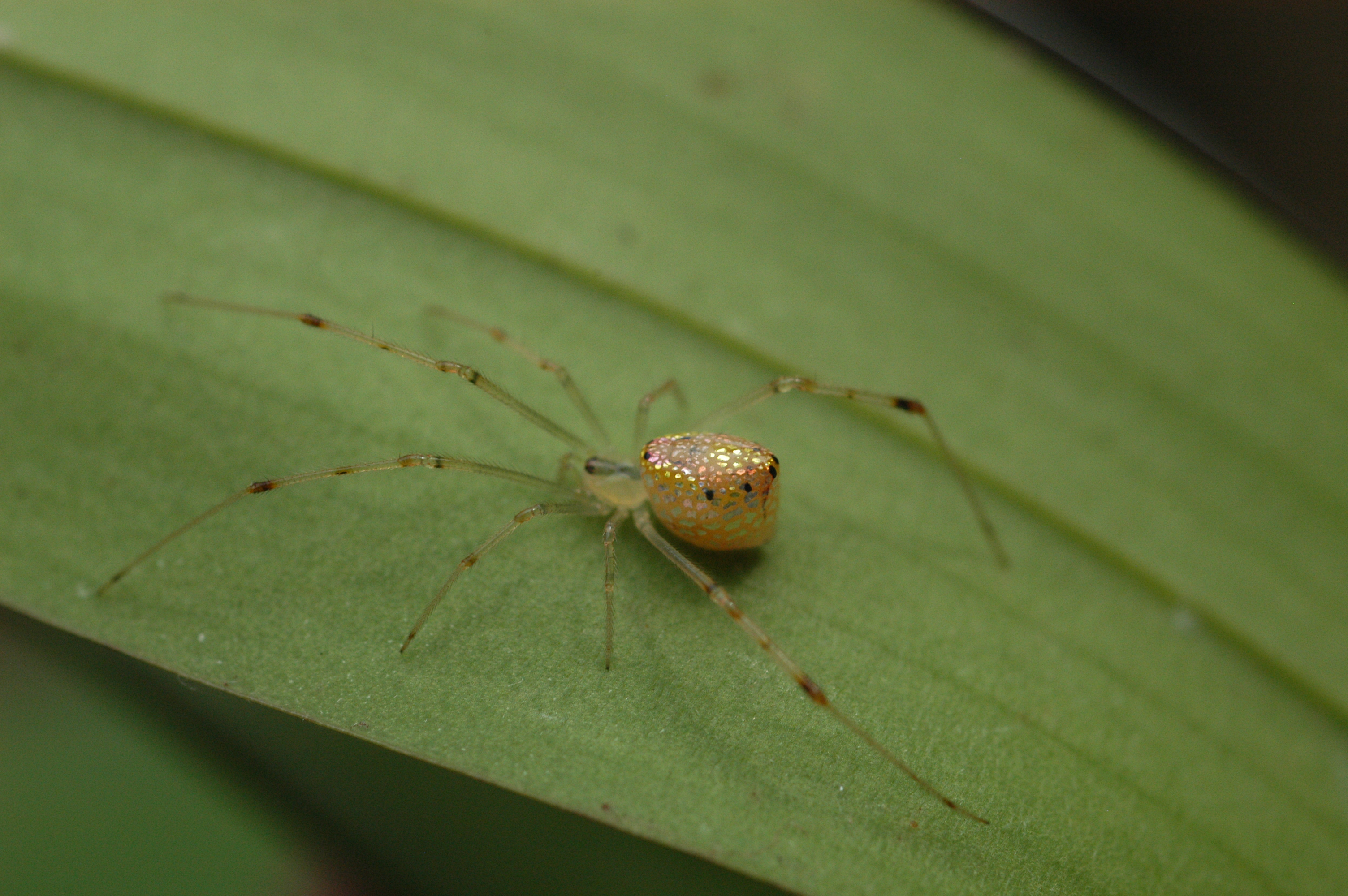
- Thwaitesia sp. from the NSW Central Coast

Scientific classification
- Kingdom: Animalia
- Phylum: Arthropoda
- Subphylum: Chelicerata
- Class: Arachnida
- Order: Araneae
- Infraorder: Araneomorphae
- Family: Theridiidae
- Genus: Thwaitesia; O. Pickard-Cambridge, 1881

Type species
- T. margaritifera O. Pickard-Cambridge, 1881

Species
- 23, see text

Synonyms
- Topo Exline, 1950

= Thwaitesia =

- T. affinis, female

Genus of spiders

Thwaitesia is a genus of comb-footed spiders that was first described by Octavius Pickard-Cambridge in 1881. The genus is named after George Henry Kendrick Thwaites.

T. affinis females are 4.6 millimetres (0.18 in) long, and males are 2.7 millimetres (0.11 in) long. T. bracteata are about the same size. They are similar in appearance to members of both Spintharus and Episinus.

== Species ==
As of June 2020 it contains twenty-three species, found in the tropics worldwide:

- Thwaitesia affinis O. Pickard-Cambridge, 1882 – Panama to Paraguay
- Thwaitesia algerica Simon, 1895 – Algeria
- Thwaitesia argentata Thorell, 1890 – Indonesia (Sumatra)
- Thwaitesia argenteoguttata (Tullgren, 1910) – Kenya, Tanzania
- Thwaitesia argenteosquamata (Lenz, 1891) – Madagascar
- Thwaitesia argentiopunctata (Rainbow, 1916) – Australia (Queensland)
- Thwaitesia aureosignata (Lenz, 1891) – Madagascar
- Thwaitesia bracteata (Exline, 1950) – Trinidad, Colombia to Paraguay
- Thwaitesia dangensis Patel & Patel, 1972 – India
- Thwaitesia glabicauda Zhu, 1998 – China
- Thwaitesia inaurata (Vinson, 1863) – Réunion
- Thwaitesia margaritifera O. Pickard-Cambridge, 1881 (type) – India, Sri Lanka, China, Vietnam
- Thwaitesia meruensis (Tullgren, 1910) – Tanzania
- Thwaitesia nigrimaculata Song, Zhang & Zhu, 2006 – China
- Thwaitesia nigronodosa (Rainbow, 1912) – Australia (Queensland)
- Thwaitesia phoenicolegna Thorell, 1895 – Myanmar, Vietnam
- Thwaitesia pulcherrima Butler, 1883 – Madagascar
- Thwaitesia rhomboidalis Simon, 1903 – Equatorial Guinea
- Thwaitesia scintillans Kulczyński, 1911 – New Guinea
- Thwaitesia simoni (Keyserling, 1884) – Brazil
- Thwaitesia spinicauda Thorell, 1895 – Myanmar
- Thwaitesia splendida Keyserling, 1884 – Panama to Venezuela
- Thwaitesia turbinata Simon, 1903 – Sierra Leone

Formerly included:

- T. argyrodiformis (Yaginuma, 1952) (Transferred to Chrysso)

Nomen dubium

- T. conifera (Blackwall, 1862)
