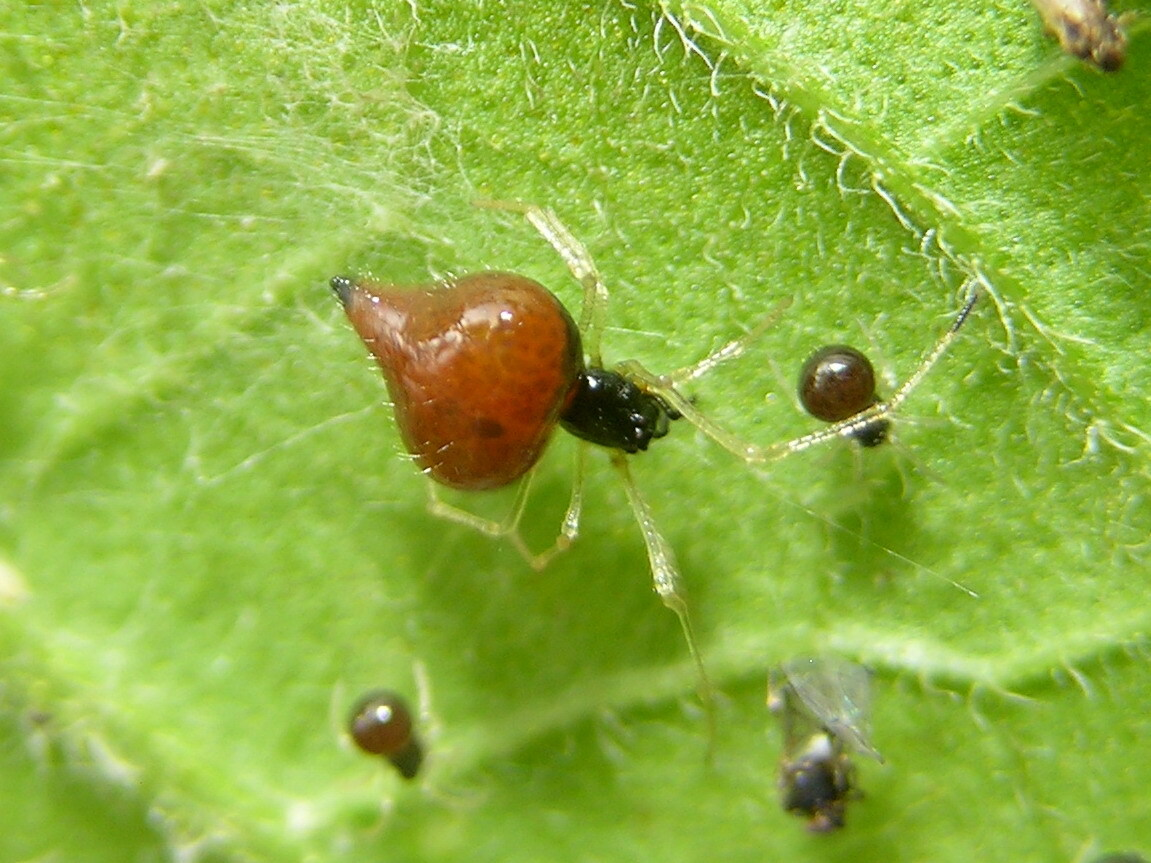
- female from Thailand

Scientific classification
- Kingdom: Animalia
- Phylum: Arthropoda
- Subphylum: Chelicerata
- Class: Arachnida
- Order: Araneae
- Infraorder: Araneomorphae
- Family: Theridiidae
- Genus: Chikunia
- Species: C. nigra

Binomial name
- Chikunia nigra (O. Pickard-Cambridge, 1880)

Synonyms
- Argyrodes nigra O. Pickard-Cambridge, 1880; Theridula caudata Lee, 1966; Chrysso nigra Levi, 1962

= Chikunia nigra =

Species of spider

Chikunia nigra is a species of spider of the genus Chikunia. It is found from Sri Lanka to Taiwan, and Indonesia.

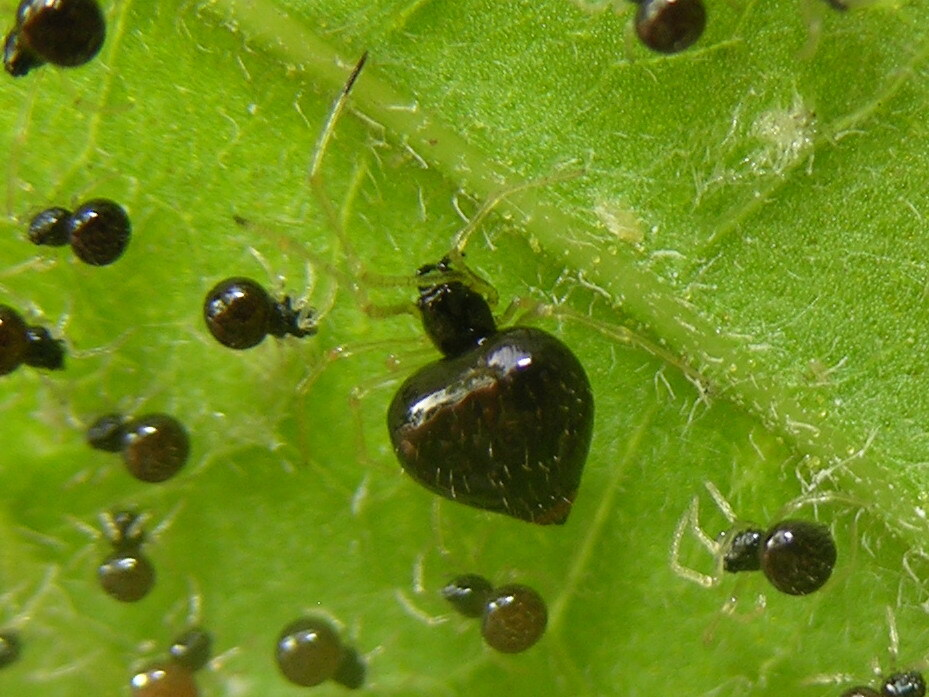
female and juveniles from Thailand

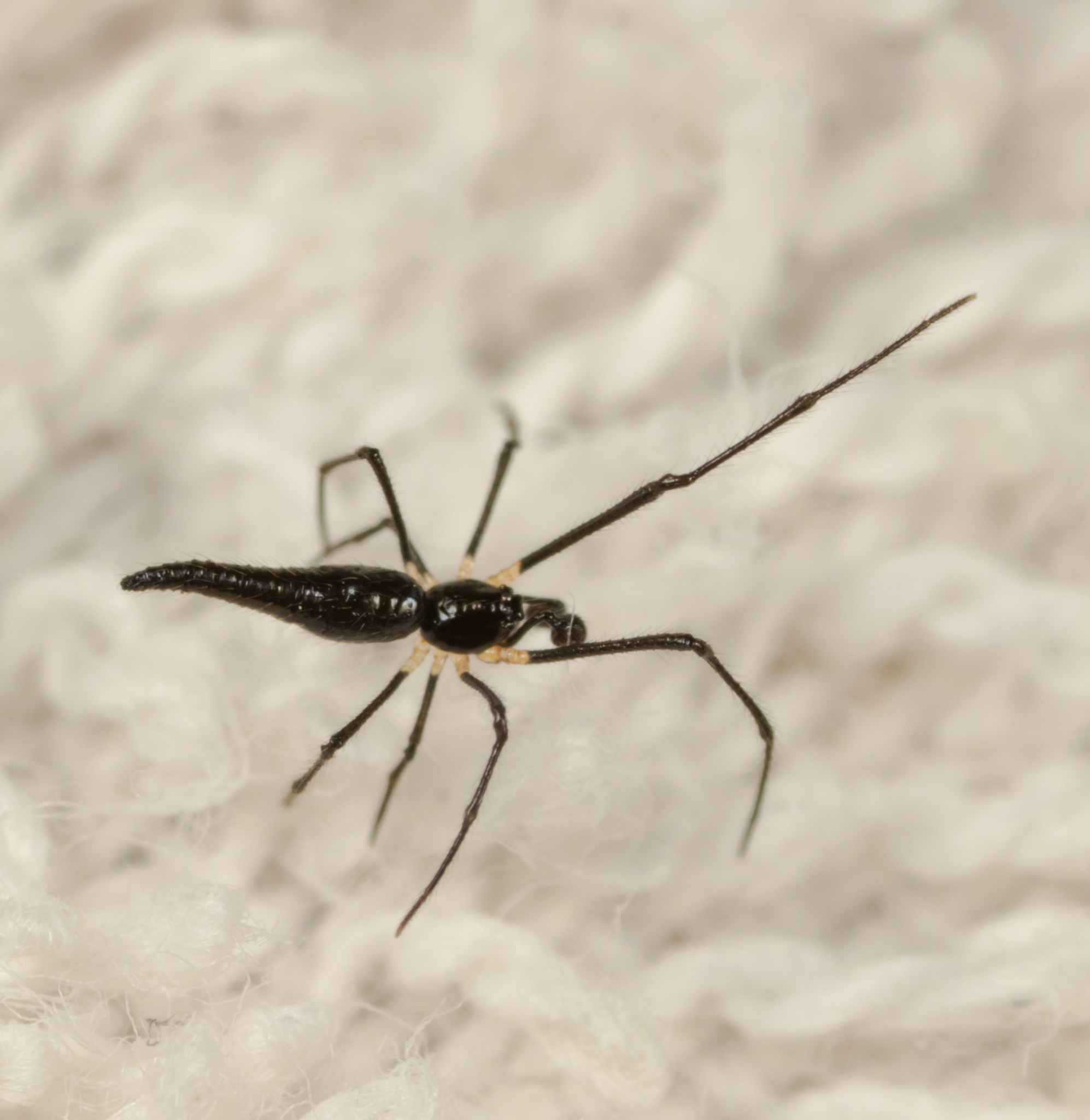
male from Hong Kong
