= Chikunia albipes =

Scientific classification
- Domain: Eukaryota
- Kingdom: Animalia
- Phylum: Arthropoda
- Subphylum: Chelicerata
- Class: Arachnida
- Order: Araneae
- Infraorder: Araneomorphae
- Family: Theridiidae
- Genus: Chikunia
- Species: C. albipes

Binomial name
- Chikunia albipes (Saito, 1935)

Species of spider

Chikunia albipes is a species of comb-footed spider in the family Theridiidae. It is found in Russia, China, Korea, and Japan.
