= Hentziectypus florendidus =

Scientific classification
- Domain: Eukaryota
- Kingdom: Animalia
- Phylum: Arthropoda
- Subphylum: Chelicerata
- Class: Arachnida
- Order: Araneae
- Infraorder: Araneomorphae
- Family: Theridiidae
- Genus: Hentziectypus
- Species: H. florendidus

Binomial name
- Hentziectypus florendidus (Levi, 1959)

Species of spider

Hentziectypus florendidus is a species of comb-footed spider in the family Theridiidae. It is found from the USA to Venezuela.
