= Achaearanea dubitabilis =

Scientific classification
- Kingdom: Animalia
- Phylum: Arthropoda
- Subphylum: Chelicerata
- Class: Arachnida
- Order: Araneae
- Infraorder: Araneomorphae
- Family: Theridiidae
- Genus: Achaearanea
- Species: A. dubitabilis

Binomial name
- Achaearanea dubitabilis Wunderlich, 1987

Species of spider

Achaearanea dubitabilis is a tangle web spider species found in the Canary Islands.
