= Hentziectypus florens =

Scientific classification
- Kingdom: Animalia
- Phylum: Arthropoda
- Subphylum: Chelicerata
- Class: Arachnida
- Order: Araneae
- Infraorder: Araneomorphae
- Family: Theridiidae
- Genus: Hentziectypus
- Species: H. florens

Binomial name
- Hentziectypus florens (O. Pickard-Cambridge, 1896)

Species of spider

Hentziectypus florens is a species of comb-footed spider in the family Theridiidae. It is found from the US to Panama, and Cuba.
