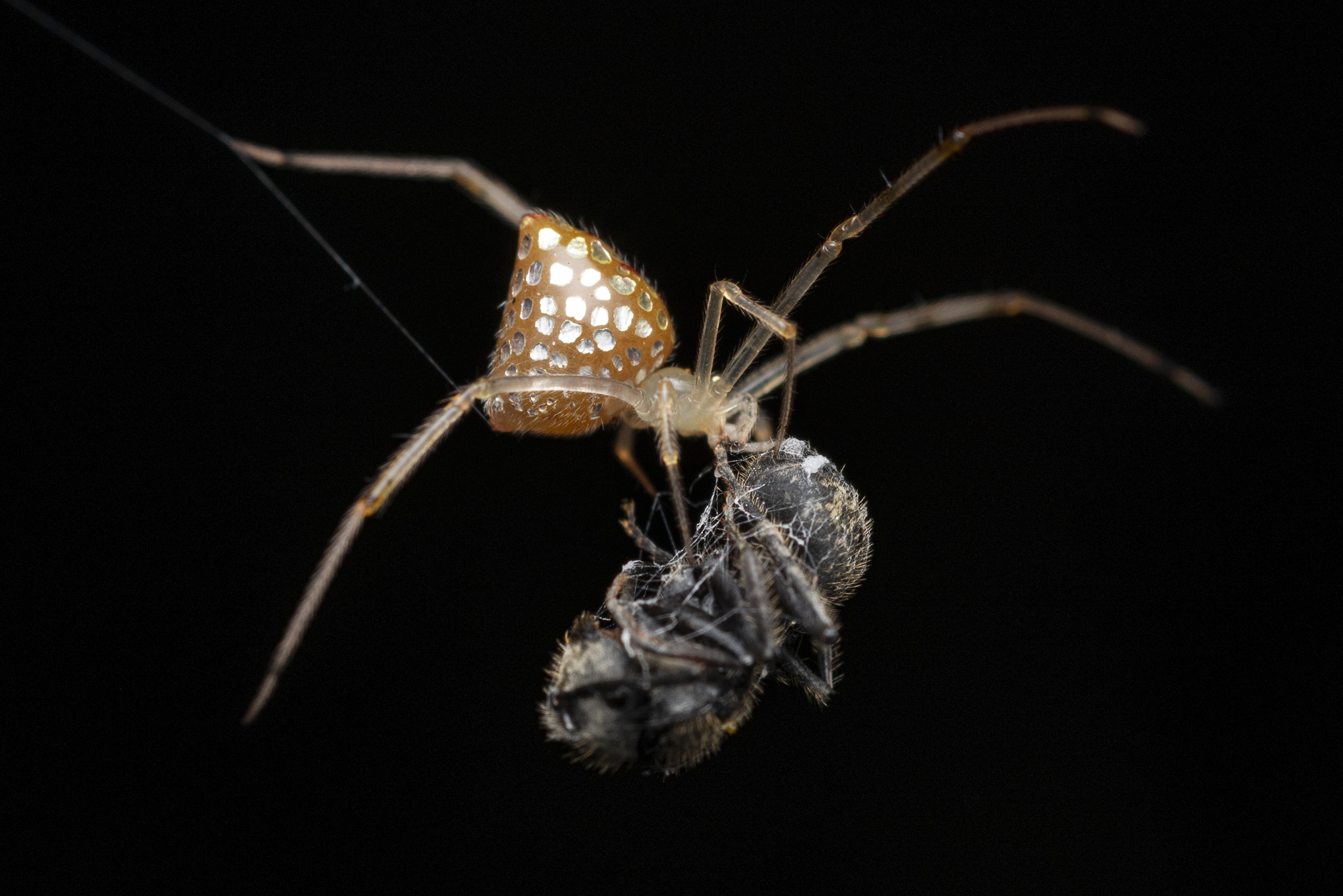
- female from Hong Kong

Scientific classification
- Kingdom: Animalia
- Phylum: Arthropoda
- Subphylum: Chelicerata
- Class: Arachnida
- Order: Araneae
- Infraorder: Araneomorphae
- Family: Theridiidae
- Genus: Thwaitesia
- Species: T. margaritifera

Binomial name
- Thwaitesia margaritifera O. Pickard-Cambridge, 1881

= Thwaitesia margaritifera =

Species of spider

Thwaitesia margaritifera is a species of spider of the genus Thwaitesia. It is found in China, India, Sri Lanka and Vietnam.
