= Coleosoma acutiventer =

Scientific classification
- Kingdom: Animalia
- Phylum: Arthropoda
- Subphylum: Chelicerata
- Class: Arachnida
- Order: Araneae
- Infraorder: Araneomorphae
- Family: Theridiidae
- Genus: Coleosoma
- Species: C. acutiventer

Binomial name
- Coleosoma acutiventer (Keyserling, 1884)

Species of spider

Coleosoma acutiventer is a species of cobweb spider in the family Theridiidae. It is found in a range from the United States to Argentina.
