= Campanicola tanakai =

Scientific classification
- Kingdom: Animalia
- Phylum: Arthropoda
- Subphylum: Chelicerata
- Class: Arachnida
- Order: Araneae
- Infraorder: Araneomorphae
- Family: Theridiidae
- Genus: Campanicola
- Species: C. tanakai

Binomial name
- Campanicola tanakai Yoshida, 2015

Species of spider

Campanicola tanakai is a species of comb-footed spider in the family Theridiidae. It is found in Taiwan. It was first described by Yoshida in 2015.
