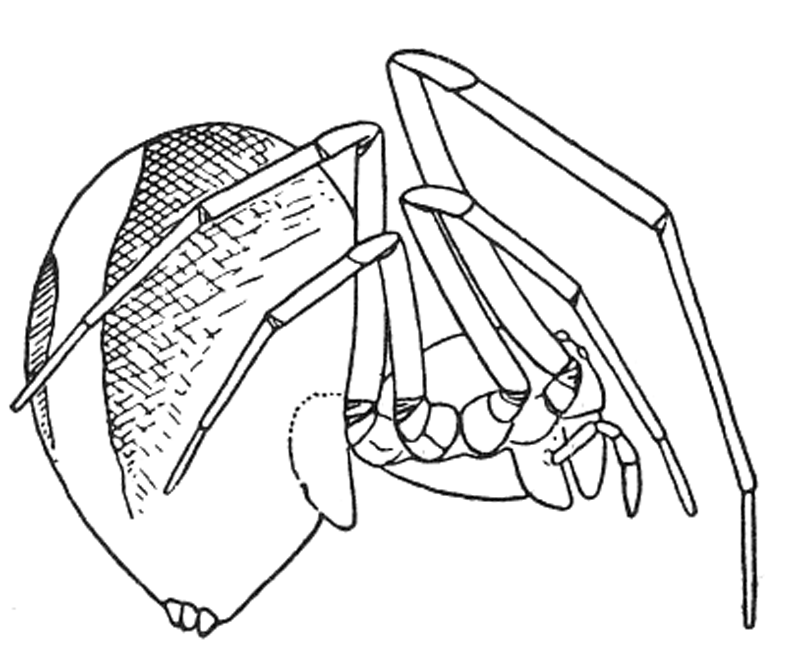

Scientific classification
- Domain: Eukaryota
- Kingdom: Animalia
- Phylum: Arthropoda
- Subphylum: Chelicerata
- Class: Arachnida
- Order: Araneae
- Infraorder: Araneomorphae
- Family: Theridiidae
- Genus: Hentziectypus
- Species: H. globosus

Binomial name
- Hentziectypus globosus (Hentz, 1850)

= Hentziectypus globosus =

Species of spider

Hentziectypus globosus is a species of cobweb spider in the family Theridiidae. It is found in North America.
