= Chrysso orchis =

Scientific classification
- Kingdom: Animalia
- Phylum: Arthropoda
- Subphylum: Chelicerata
- Class: Arachnida
- Order: Araneae
- Infraorder: Araneomorphae
- Family: Theridiidae
- Genus: Chrysso
- Species: C. orchis

Binomial name
- Chrysso orchis Yoshida, Tso & Severinghaus, 2000
- Chrysso orchis is known from Orchid Island, Taiwan

Species of spider

Chrysso orchis is a species of comb-footed spider in the family Theridiidae. It is endemic to Taiwan. The type series – three males and two females – was collected from Orchid Island.

Male Chrysso orchis measure 2.02–2.53 mm (0.08–0.10 in) and females 2.48–2.68 mm (0.10–0.11 in) in total length. Basal color is light yellowish green. The abdomen bears four pairs of indistinct black flecks. The carapace has indistinct marginal stripes. The eyes have black bases. The distal part of metatarsi and the palpal tarsi are brown.
