= Achaearanea globispira =

Sanddrift Bauble Comb-Foot Spider

Scientific classification
- Kingdom: Animalia
- Phylum: Arthropoda
- Subphylum: Chelicerata
- Class: Arachnida
- Order: Araneae
- Infraorder: Araneomorphae
- Family: Theridiidae
- Genus: Achaearanea
- Species: A. globispira

Binomial name
- Achaearanea globispira Henschel & Jocqué, 1994

Species of spider

Achaearanea globispira is a species of spider in the family Theridiidae. It is endemic to South Africa and is commonly known as the sanddrift bauble comb-foot spider.

== Distribution ==
Achaearanea globispira is endemic to South Africa. where it is known from the Northern Cape and Western Cape provinces. Notable locations include Goegap Nature Reserve, Clanwilliam, and the Cederberg Wilderness Area at Dwarsrivier, Sanddrift.

== Habitat and ecology ==
This spider lives in a spherical retreat made of silk and sand pebbles. The structure dangles from a single thread and has a small opening at the bottom leading into a spirally-coiled tunnel. Males and females build spirals in opposite directions, allowing the male to construct his retreat against the female's to form a brood chamber.

Retreats are located in cool places under low overhanging rocks or branches. The narrow, suspended retreat configuration may reduce vulnerability to predators while foraging for ants. Bauble spiders feed primarily on ants.

The species has been sampled at altitudes ranging from 78 to 1458 m.

== Conservation ==
Achaearanea globispira is listed as Data Deficient by the South African National Biodiversity Institute. Additional sampling is needed to determine the full range of this species. It is protected in Goegap Nature Reserve.

== Taxonomy ==
Achaearanea globispira was described by Joh R. Henschel and Rudy Jocqué in 1994 from Dwarsrivier, Sanddrift in the Western Cape. The species is known from both sexes.
