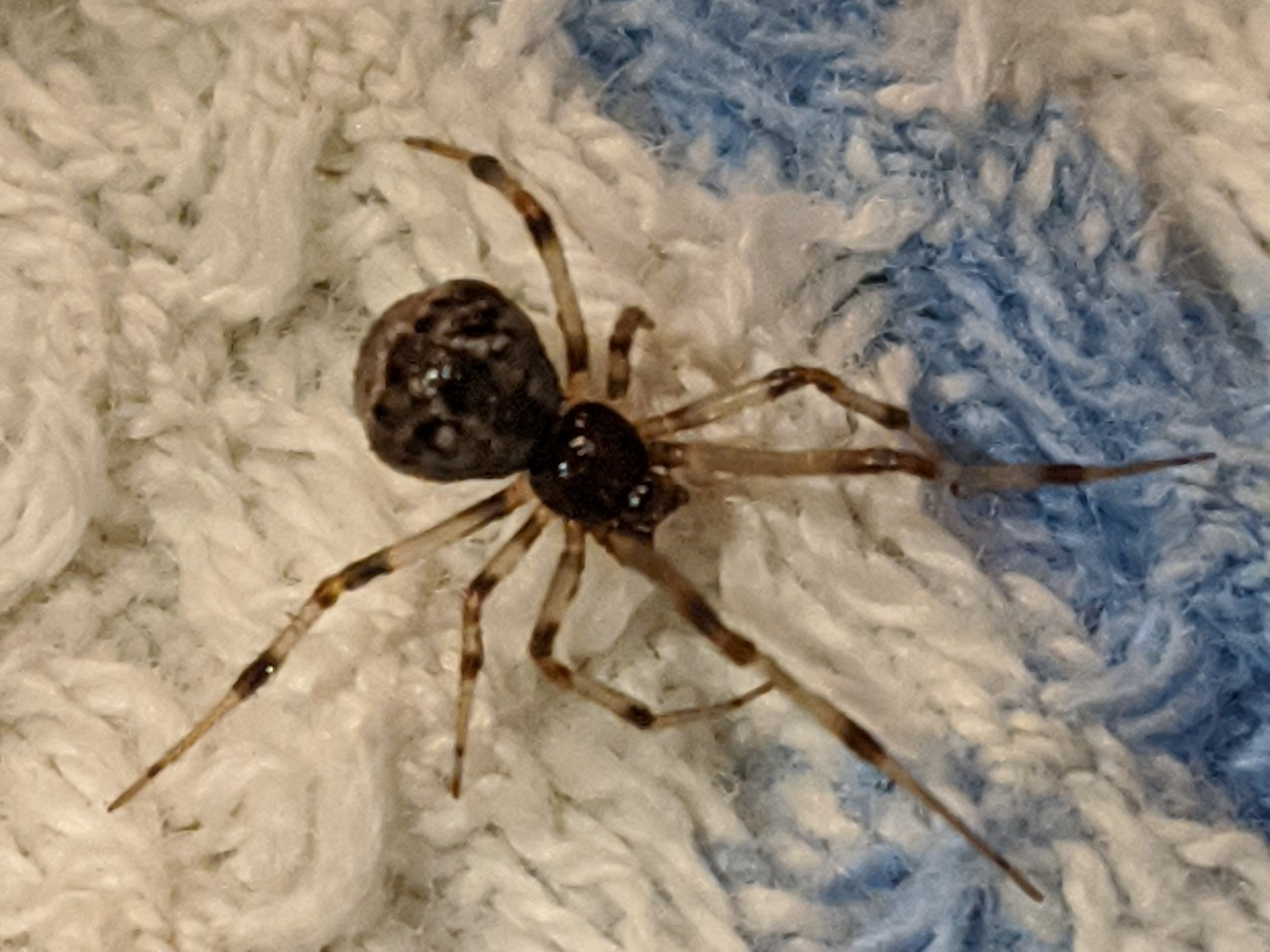

Scientific classification
- Domain: Eukaryota
- Kingdom: Animalia
- Phylum: Arthropoda
- Subphylum: Chelicerata
- Class: Arachnida
- Order: Araneae
- Infraorder: Araneomorphae
- Family: Theridiidae
- Genus: Cryptachaea
- Species: C. rupicola

Binomial name
- Cryptachaea rupicola (Emerton, 1882)

= Cryptachaea rupicola =

Species of spider

Cryptachaea rupicola is a species of cobweb spider in the family Theridiidae. It is found in the United States and Canada.
