= Chrysso albomaculata =

Scientific classification
- Kingdom: Animalia
- Phylum: Arthropoda
- Subphylum: Chelicerata
- Class: Arachnida
- Order: Araneae
- Infraorder: Araneomorphae
- Family: Theridiidae
- Genus: Chrysso
- Species: C. albomaculata

Binomial name
- Chrysso albomaculata O. P-Cambridge, 1882

Synonyms
- Several, including: Argyrodes elegans Taczanowski, 1873; Chrysso elegans (Taczanowski, 1873)

Species of spider

Chrysso albomaculata is a species of spider found in the United States, as well as in the Caribbean and Brazil.
