= Chikunia bilde =

Scientific classification
- Domain: Eukaryota
- Kingdom: Animalia
- Phylum: Arthropoda
- Subphylum: Chelicerata
- Class: Arachnida
- Order: Araneae
- Infraorder: Araneomorphae
- Family: Theridiidae
- Genus: Chikunia
- Species: C. bilde

Binomial name
- Chikunia bilde Smith, Agnarsson & Grinsted, 2019

Species of spider

Chikunia bilde is a species of comb-footed spider in the family Theridiidae. It is found in Malaysia, Singapore, and Indonesia. The Chikunia bilde was first discovered in 2019 by researchers and is described as being unusually tolerant of human activity.
