= Cryptachaea porteri =

Scientific classification
- Domain: Eukaryota
- Kingdom: Animalia
- Phylum: Arthropoda
- Subphylum: Chelicerata
- Class: Arachnida
- Order: Araneae
- Infraorder: Araneomorphae
- Family: Theridiidae
- Genus: Cryptachaea
- Species: C. porteri

Binomial name
- Cryptachaea porteri (Banks, 1896)

Species of spider

Cryptachaea porteri is a species of cobweb spider in the family Theridiidae. It is found in a range from the United States to Panama and the Caribbean Sea.
