= Cryptachaea riparia =

Scientific classification
- Kingdom: Animalia
- Phylum: Arthropoda
- Subphylum: Chelicerata
- Class: Arachnida
- Order: Araneae
- Infraorder: Araneomorphae
- Family: Theridiidae
- Genus: Cryptachaea
- Species: C. riparia

Binomial name
- Cryptachaea riparia (Blackwall, 1834)

Synonyms
- Theridion riparium Blackwall, 1834; Theridion saxatile C. L. Koch, 1835; Achaearanea riparia — Miller, 1971; Cryptachaea riparia — Yoshida, 2008

Species of spider

Cryptachaea riparia is a spider species with Palearctic distribution. It is notably found in Lithuania.
