= Hentziectypus rafaeli =

Scientific classification
- Kingdom: Animalia
- Phylum: Arthropoda
- Subphylum: Chelicerata
- Class: Arachnida
- Order: Araneae
- Infraorder: Araneomorphae
- Family: Theridiidae
- Genus: Hentziectypus
- Species: H. rafaeli

Binomial name
- Hentziectypus rafaeli (Buckup & Marques, 1991)

Species of spider

Hentziectypus rafaeli is a species of comb-footed spider in the family Theridiidae. It is found in Brazil and Bolivia.
