= Campanicola =

Scientific classification
- Kingdom: Animalia
- Phylum: Arthropoda
- Subphylum: Chelicerata
- Class: Arachnida
- Order: Araneae
- Infraorder: Araneomorphae
- Family: Theridiidae
- Genus: Campanicola; Yoshida, 2015

Type species
- Campanicola formosana Yoshida, 2015

Species
- 10, see text

Genus of spiders

Campanicola is a genus of spiders in the family Theridiidae. It was first described in 2015 by Yoshida and the name is after their habit of constructing hanging bell-shaped retreats made from detritus around them.

== Species ==
As of May 2022 it contains ten species, found only in Asia:

- Campanicola anguilliformis Li & Liu, 2021 – China
- Campanicola campanulata (Chen, 1993) – China
- Campanicola chitouensis Yoshida, 2015 – Taiwan
- Campanicola falciformis Li & Liu, 2021 – China
- Campanicola ferrumequina (Bösenberg & Strand, 1906) – China, Korea, Japan
- Campanicola formosana Yoshida, 2015 – Taiwan
- Campanicola heteroidea Li & Liu, 2021 – China
- Campanicola tanakai Yoshida, 2015 – Taiwan
- Campanicola tauricornis Li & Liu, 2021 – China (Hainan)
- Campanicola volubilis Li & Liu, 2021 – China
