= Bardala labarda =

Scientific classification
- Kingdom: Animalia
- Phylum: Arthropoda
- Subphylum: Chelicerata
- Class: Arachnida
- Order: Araneae
- Infraorder: Araneomorphae
- Family: Theridiidae
- Genus: Bardala; Saaristo, 2006
- Species: B. labarda

Binomial name
- Bardala labarda (Roberts, 1983)

Genus of spiders

Bardala labarda is the only species in the monotypic genus Bardala, a member of the comb-footed spider family Theridiidae. It was first described by Michael I. Saaristo in 2006, and is endemic to the coral atoll of Aldabra.
