= Echinotheridion =

Scientific classification
- Kingdom: Animalia
- Phylum: Arthropoda
- Subphylum: Chelicerata
- Class: Arachnida
- Order: Araneae
- Infraorder: Araneomorphae
- Family: Theridiidae
- Genus: Echinotheridion; Levi, 1963

Type species
- E. cartum Levi, 1963

Species
- 9, see text

Genus of spiders

Echinotheridion is a genus of comb-footed spiders that was first described by Herbert Walter Levi in 1963.

== Species ==
As of May 2020 it contains nine species, found in South America, with the exception of E. gibberosum, found on Madeira and the Canary Islands.:

- Echinotheridion andresito Ramírez & González, 1999 – Brazil, Argentina
- Echinotheridion cartum Levi, 1963 (type) – Brazil, Paraguay, Argentina
- Echinotheridion elicolum Levi, 1963 – Venezuela
- Echinotheridion gibberosum (Kulczyński, 1899) – Madeira, Canary Is.
- Echinotheridion levii Ramírez & González, 1999 – Brazil
- Echinotheridion lirum Marques & Buckup, 1989 – Brazil
- Echinotheridion otlum Levi, 1963 – Ecuador
- Echinotheridion urarum Buckup & Marques, 1989 – Brazil
- Echinotheridion utibile (Keyserling, 1884) – Brazil

Formerly included:

- E. pseudogibberosum (Schmidt, 1973) (Transferred to Tidarren)
