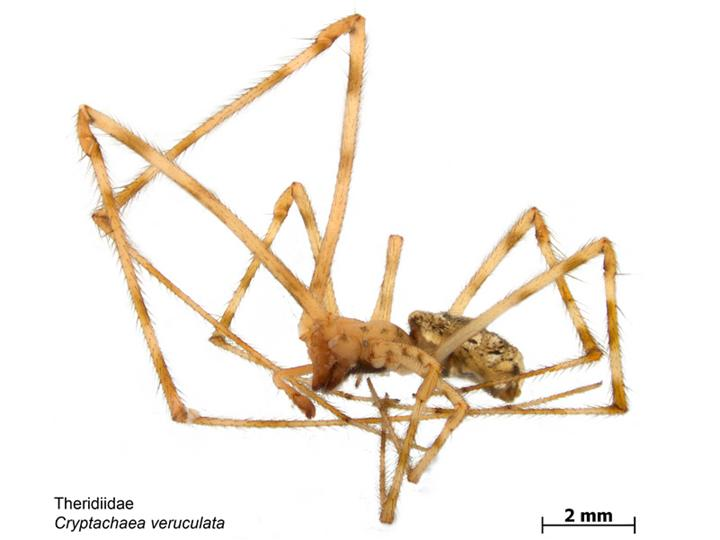

Scientific classification
- Domain: Eukaryota
- Kingdom: Animalia
- Phylum: Arthropoda
- Subphylum: Chelicerata
- Class: Arachnida
- Order: Araneae
- Infraorder: Araneomorphae
- Family: Theridiidae
- Genus: Cryptachaea
- Species: C. veruculata

Binomial name
- Cryptachaea veruculata (Urquhart, 1885)

Synonyms
- Theridion veruculatum Theridion nigrofolium Achaearanea veruculatum

= Cryptachaea veruculata =

Species of spider

Cryptachaea veruculata is a spider native to Australia and New Zealand. It has been introduced into England and Belgium. The species has potential to control spider mites and leafroller caterpillars in New Zealand.

== Description ==
Females reach a body size of about 4 mm, males only about 1.5 mm. They sometimes build small webs in flowers and green vegetation, but will also build webs in corners of the outer walls of buildings.

== Taxonomy ==
This species was moved from genus Achaearanea in 2008.

== Name ==
Common names include Diamond Comb-footed Spider. In New Zealand, it is also known as just "cobweb spider".

== Gallery ==
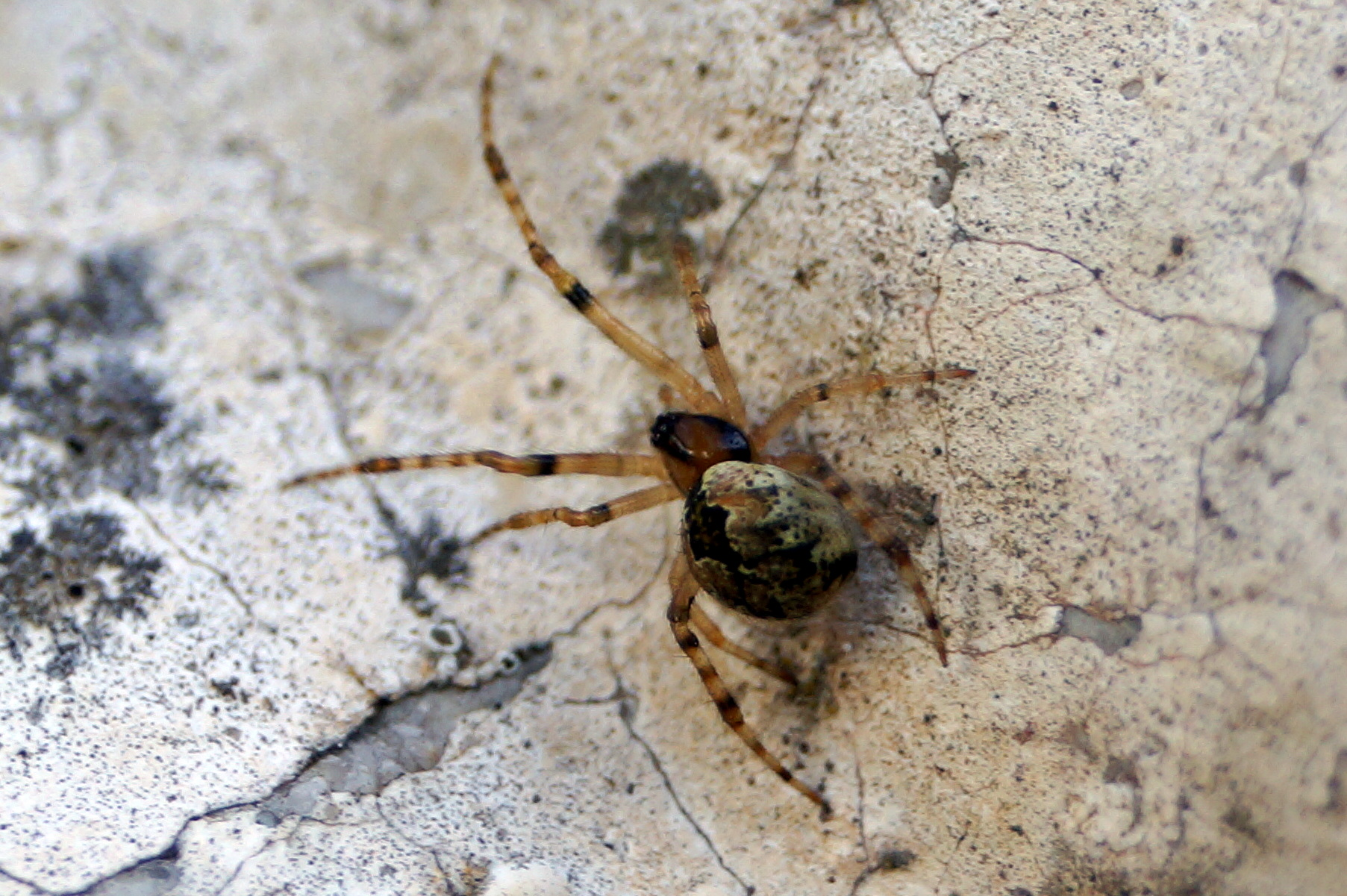
