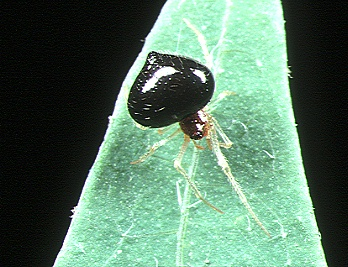
- Chikunia albipes

Scientific classification
- Kingdom: Animalia
- Phylum: Arthropoda
- Subphylum: Chelicerata
- Class: Arachnida
- Order: Araneae
- Infraorder: Araneomorphae
- Family: Theridiidae
- Genus: Chikunia; Yoshida, 2009

Type species
- Chikunia albipes (Saito, 1935)

Diversity
- 3, see text

= Chikunia =

Genus of spiders

Chikunia is a genus of Asian comb-footed spiders that was first described by H. Yoshida in 2009. These spiders are small, often dark or orange colored. This species can be found in solidarity, though they can also be found in colonies.

== Colonies ==
The species C. bilde and C. nigra are unique for spiders, as they are capable of forming inter-species colonies, both spiders being each other's closest relative. Both species care for their young, and are thought to do the same to their neighbor's young. These colonies can be around 100 strong, with each adult keeping a distinct territory inside the colony. Another question raised by this unique arrangement is the fact that they are both genetically distinct species.

== Species ==
As of May 2020 it contains three species, found in Asia:

- Chikunia albipes (Saito, 1935) – Eastern Russia, China, Korea, Japan
- Chikunia bilde Smith, Agnarsson & Grinsted, 2019 – Malaysia, Singapore, Indonesia
- Chikunia nigra (O. Pickard-Cambridge, 1880) – India, Sri Lanka to Taiwan, Indonesia.
