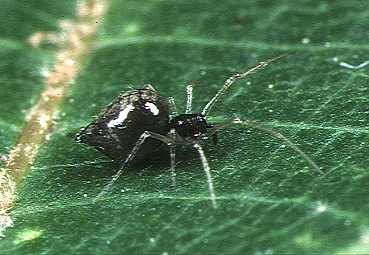
- C. blandum, female

Scientific classification
- Kingdom: Animalia
- Phylum: Arthropoda
- Subphylum: Chelicerata
- Class: Arachnida
- Order: Araneae
- Infraorder: Araneomorphae
- Family: Theridiidae
- Genus: Coleosoma; O. Pickard-Cambridge, 1882

Type species
- C. blandum O. Pickard-Cambridge, 1882

Species
- 10, see text

= Coleosoma =

Genus of spiders

Coleosoma is a genus of comb-footed spiders that was first described by Octavius Pickard-Cambridge in 1882.

== Distribution ==
Spiders in this genus are found all over the world.

== Species ==
As of October 2025, this genus includes ten species:

- Coleosoma acutiventer (Keyserling, 1884) – USA to Argentina
- Coleosoma africanum Schmidt & Krause, 1995 – Cape Verde
- Coleosoma blandum O. Pickard-Cambridge, 1882 – Seychelles, India, India, Sri Lanka, Bangladesh, Myanmar, Thailand, Philippines, China, Japan. Introduced to Seychelles, Hawaii (type species)
- Coleosoma caliothripsum Barrion & Litsinger, 1995 – Philippines
- Coleosoma floridanum Banks, 1900 – North, Central and South America. Introduced to Europe, Macaronesia, West Africa, Seychelles, India, Sri Lanka, Philippines, China, Japan, Pacific Islands
- Coleosoma matinikum Barrion & Litsinger, 1995 – Philippines
- Coleosoma normale Bryant, 1944 – USA to Brazil
- Coleosoma octomaculatum (Bösenberg & Strand, 1906) – Japan, Korea, China, Taiwan. Introduced to New Zealand
- Coleosoma pabilogum Barrion & Litsinger, 1995 – Philippines
- Coleosoma pseudoblandum Barrion & Litsinger, 1995 – Philippines

Formerly included:

- C. adamsoni (Berland, 1934) (Transferred to Platnickina)
- C. margaritum Yoshida, 1985 (Transferred to Neottiura)

In synonymy:

- C. acrobeles = Coleosoma blandum O. Pickard-Cambridge, 1882
- C. albovittatum = Coleosoma floridanum Banks, 1900
- C. aleipata = Coleosoma floridanum Banks, 1900
- C. antheae = Coleosoma floridanum Banks, 1900
- C. conurum = Coleosoma blandum O. Pickard-Cambridge, 1882
- C. delebile = Coleosoma floridanum Banks, 1900
- C. flavipes O. Pickard-Cambridge, 1895 = Coleosoma acutiventer (Keyserling, 1884)
- C. floridanum = Coleosoma acutiventer (Keyserling, 1884)
- C. interruptum = Coleosoma floridanum Banks, 1900
- C. nigripalpe = Coleosoma acutiventer (Keyserling, 1884)
- C. rapanae = Coleosoma floridanum Banks, 1900
- C. saispotum Barrion & Litsinger, 1995 = Coleosoma floridanum Banks, 1900
- C. semicinctum (Banks, 1914) = Coleosoma floridanum Banks, 1900
- C. vituperabile = Coleosoma blandum O. Pickard-Cambridge, 1882
