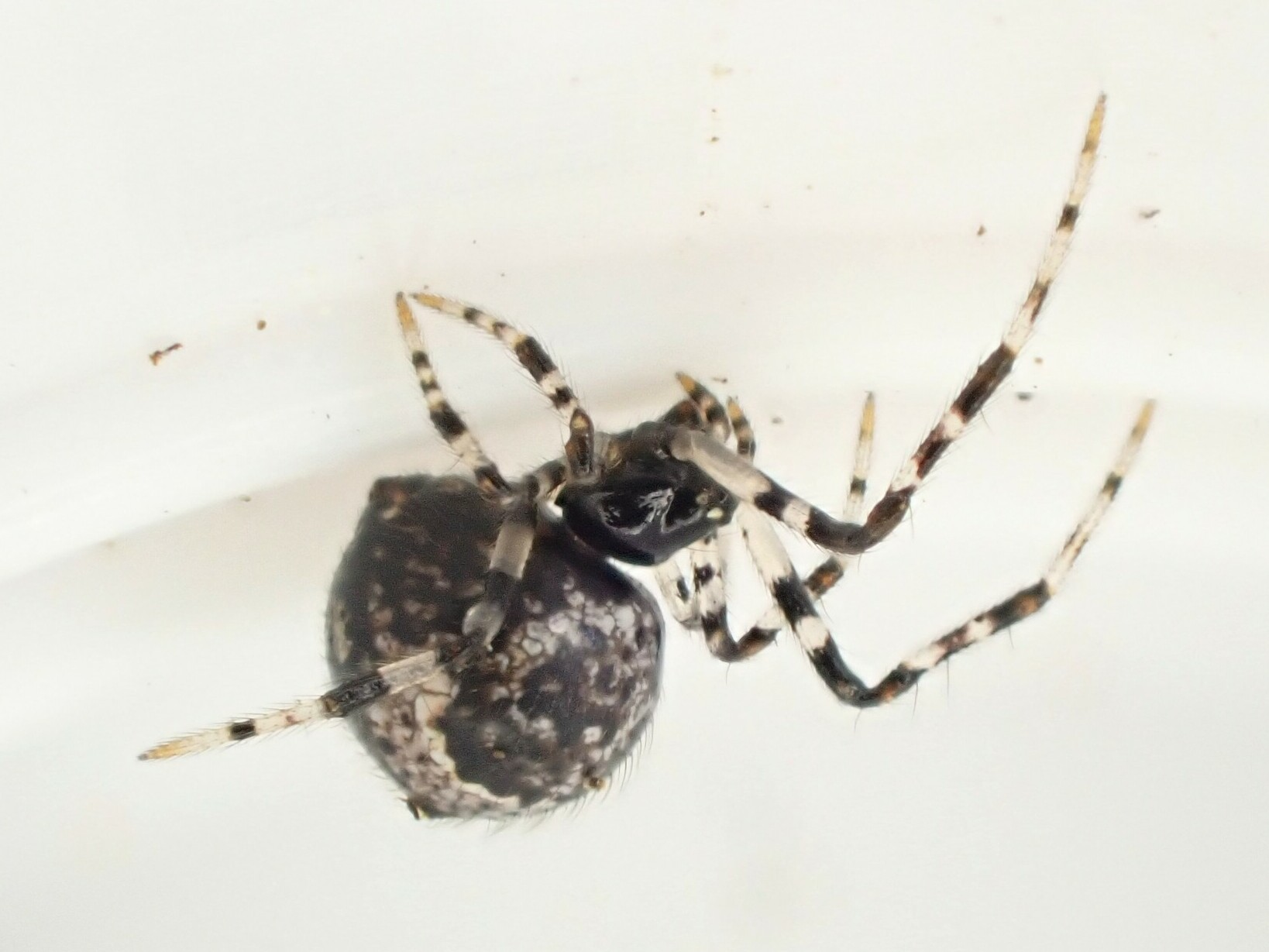

Scientific classification
- Domain: Eukaryota
- Kingdom: Animalia
- Phylum: Arthropoda
- Subphylum: Chelicerata
- Class: Arachnida
- Order: Araneae
- Infraorder: Araneomorphae
- Family: Theridiidae
- Genus: Cryptachaea
- Species: C. blattea

Binomial name
- Cryptachaea blattea (Urquhart, 1886)

= Cryptachaea blattea =

Species of spider

Cryptachaea blattea is a species of cobweb spider in the family Theridiidae. It is found in Africa, and has been introduced into the United States, Chile, the Azores, Europe, Australia, New Zealand, and Hawaii.
