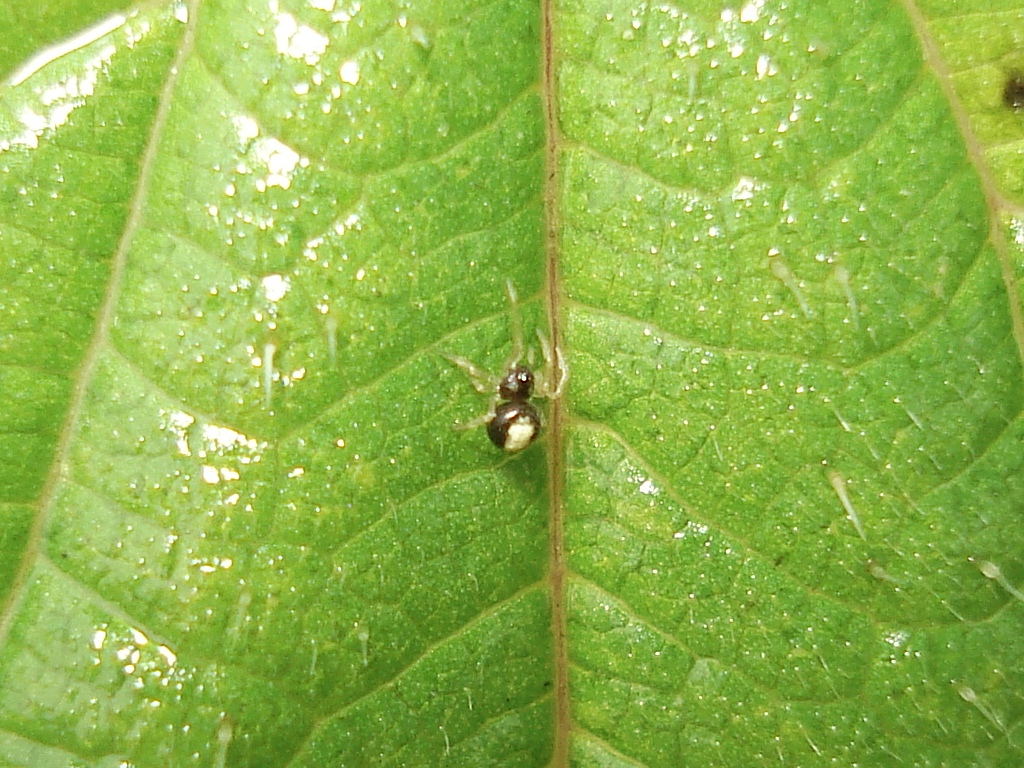
- Neottiura bimaculata

Scientific classification
- Kingdom: Animalia
- Phylum: Arthropoda
- Subphylum: Chelicerata
- Class: Arachnida
- Order: Araneae
- Infraorder: Araneomorphae
- Family: Theridiidae
- Genus: Neottiura; Menge, 1868

Type species
- N. bimaculata (Linnaeus, 1767)

Species
- 6, see text

= Neottiura =

Genus of spiders

Neottiura is a genus of comb-footed spiders that was first described by Anton Menge in 1868.

== Species ==
As of May 2020 it contains six species and one subspecies, found in Asia, Europe, North America, and Algeria:

- Neottiura bimaculata (Linnaeus, 1767) (type) – North America, Europe, Turkey, Caucasus, Russia (Europe to Far East), Kazakhstan, Iran, Central Asia, China, Japan
  - Neottiura b. pellucida (Simon, 1873) – Spain, France, Italy
- Neottiura curvimana (Simon, 1914) – Portugal, Spain, France, Algeria
- Neottiura herbigrada (Simon, 1873) – Madeira, Mediterranean, Ukraine, China, Korea
- Neottiura margarita (Yoshida, 1985) – Russia (Far East), China, Korea, Japan
- Neottiura suaveolens (Simon, 1880) – Europe
- Neottiura uncinata (Lucas, 1846) – Mediterranean

In synonymy:

- N. apicata O. Pickard-Cambridge, 1872 = Neottiura uncinata (Lucas, 1846)
- N. nivalia (Saito, 1934) = Neottiura bimaculata (Linnaeus, 1767)
- N. pusillata (Roewer, 1942) = Neottiura herbigrada (Simon, 1873)
- N. pustulifera (Levy & Amitai, 1982) = Neottiura herbigrada (Simon, 1873)
- N. regia (Drensky, 1929) = Neottiura suaveolens (Simon, 1880)
