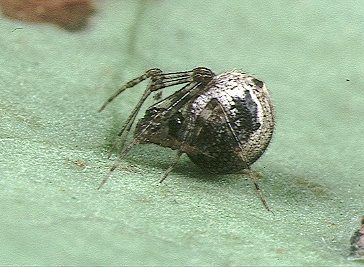
- Female C. projectivulva

Scientific classification
- Kingdom: Animalia
- Phylum: Arthropoda
- Subphylum: Chelicerata
- Class: Arachnida
- Order: Araneae
- Infraorder: Araneomorphae
- Family: Theridiidae
- Genus: Cryptachaea; Archer, 1946

Type species
- Theridion catapetraeum Gertsch & Archer, 1942

Species
- See text

Diversity
- ca. 90 species

= Cryptachaea =

Genus of spiders

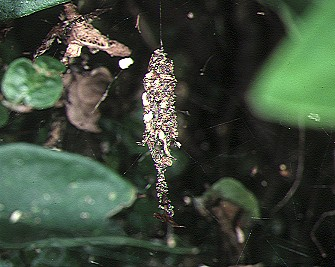
Web of P. projectivulva

Cryptachaea is a genus of spiders in the Theridiidae (tangle web spider) family.

== Taxonomy ==
Many species in this genus used to reside in Achaearanea, which received a major revision in 2008 by Hajime Yoshida. The genus was originally established as a subgenus of Theridion.

== Distribution ==
This is mostly a New World genus, with many species in South America. One species is cosmopolitan, one species occurs in the whole Palearctic, another only in China. C. veruculata was introduced to Europe from New Zealand.

== Name ==
The genus name is a combination of Achaea, the old name of the genus Achaearanea, and Ancient Greek κρυπτός "hidden". The genus is called Iwama-himegumo zoku in Japanese.

== Species ==
- Cryptachaea acoreensis (Berland, 1932) — Cosmopolitan
- Cryptachaea alacris (Keyserling, 1884) — Colombia, Venezuela
- Cryptachaea altiventer (Keyserling, 1884) — Brazil
- Cryptachaea amazonas Buckup, Marques & Rodrigues, 2012
- Cryptachaea ambera (Levi, 1963) — USA
- Cryptachaea analista (Levi, 1963) — Brazil
- Cryptachaea anastema (Levi, 1963) — Venezuela
- Cryptachaea azteca (Chamberlin & Ivie, 1936) — Mexico
- Cryptachaea banosensis (Levi, 1963) — Ecuador
- Cryptachaea barra (Levi, 1963) — Brazil
- Cryptachaea bellula (Keyserling, 1891) — Brazil
- Cryptachaea blattea (Urquhart, 1886) — cosmopolitan
- Cryptachaea caliensis (Levi, 1963) — Colombia, Ecuador
- Cryptachaea canionis (Chamberlin & Gertsch, 1929) — USA
- Cryptachaea caqueza (Levi, 1963) — Colombia
- Cryptachaea chilensis (Levi, 1963) — Chile
- Cryptachaea chiricahua (Levi, 1955) — USA
- Cryptachaea cinnabarina (Levi, 1963) — Brazil
- Cryptachaea diamantina (Levi, 1963) — Brazil
- Cryptachaea dromedariformis (Roewer, 1942) — Ecuador, Peru
- Cryptachaea eramus (Levi, 1963) — Brazil
- Cryptachaea fresno (Levi, 1955) — USA
- Cryptachaea gigantea (Keyserling, 1884) — Peru
- Cryptachaea gigantipes (Keyserling, 1890) — Australia, New Zealand
- Cryptachaea hirta (Taczanowski, 1873) — Panama to Argentina
- Cryptachaea ingijonathorum Buckup, Marques & Rodrigues, 2012
- Cryptachaea inops (Levi, 1963) — Brazil, Guyana
- Cryptachaea insulsa (Gertsch & Mulaik, 1936) — USA, Mexico
- Cryptachaea isana (Levi, 1963) — Brazil
- Cryptachaea jequirituba (Levi, 1963) — Brazil, Paraguay, Argentina
- Cryptachaea kaspi (Levi, 1963) — Peru
- Cryptachaea koepckei (Levi, 1963) — Peru
- Cryptachaea lota (Levi, 1963) — Chile
- Cryptachaea manzanillo (Levi, 1959) — Mexico
- Cryptachaea maraca (Buckup & Marques, 1991) — Brazil
- Cryptachaea maxima (Keyserling, 1891) — Brazil
- Cryptachaea meraukensis (Chrysanthus, 1963) — New Guinea
- Cryptachaea migrans (Keyserling, 1884) — Venezuela to Peru, Brazil
- Cryptachaea milagro (Levi, 1963) — Ecuador
- Cryptachaea maldonado Buckup, Marques & Rodrigues, 2012
- Cryptachaea nayaritensis (Levi, 1959) — Mexico
- Cryptachaea oblivia (O. P.-Cambridge, 1896) — Costa Rica, Panama
- Cryptachaea orana (Levi, 1963) — Ecuador
- Cryptachaea pallipera (Levi, 1963) — Brazil
- Cryptachaea parana (Levi, 1963) — Paraguay
- Cryptachaea passiva (Keyserling, 1891) — Brazil
- Cryptachaea pilaton (Levi, 1963) — Ecuador
- Cryptachaea pinguis (Keyserling, 1886) — Brazil, Uruguay
- Cryptachaea porteri (Banks, 1896) — USA to Panama, West Indies
- Cryptachaea projectivulva (Yoshida, 2001) — Japan
- Cryptachaea pura (O. P.-Cambridge, 1894) — Mexico
- Cryptachaea pusillana (Roewer, 1942) — French Guiana
- Cryptachaea pydanieli (Buckup & Marques, 1991) — Brazil
- Cryptachaea rafaeli (Buckup & Marques, 1991) — Brazil
- Cryptachaea rapa (Levi, 1963) — Paraguay
- Cryptachaea rioensis (Levi, 1963) — Brazil
- Cryptachaea riparia (Blackwall, 1834) — Palearctic
- Cryptachaea rostra (Zhu & Zhang, 1992) — China
- Cryptachaea rostrata (O. P.-Cambridge, 1896) — Mexico to Venezuela
- Cryptachaea rupicola (Emerton, 1882) — USA, Canada
- Cryptachaea schneirlai (Levi, 1959) — Panama
- Cryptachaea schraderorum (Levi, 1959) — Costa Rica
- Cryptachaea serenoae (Gertsch & Archer, 1942) — USA
- Cryptachaea sicki (Levi, 1963) — Brazil
- Cryptachaea taeniata (Keyserling, 1884) — Guatemala to Peru
- Cryptachaea tovarensis (Levi, 1963) — Venezuela
- Cryptachaea trinidensis (Levi, 1959) — Trinidad, Peru
- Cryptachaea uviana (Levi, 1963) — Peru
- Cryptachaea veruculata (Urquhart, 1886) — Australia, New Zealand, England, Belgium
- Cryptachaea vivida (Keyserling, 1891) — Brazil
- Cryptachaea zonensis (Levi, 1959) — Panama to Peru, Brazil
