= Achaeridion =

Scientific classification
- Kingdom: Animalia
- Phylum: Arthropoda
- Subphylum: Chelicerata
- Class: Arachnida
- Order: Araneae
- Infraorder: Araneomorphae
- Family: Theridiidae
- Genus: Achaeridion; Wunderlich, 2008
- Species: A. conigerum

Binomial name
- Achaeridion conigerum (Simon, 1914)

Genus of spiders

Achaeridion is a monotypic genus of comb-footed spiders containing the single species, Achaeridion conigerum. It was first described by J. Wunderlich in 2008, and is found in Europe.
