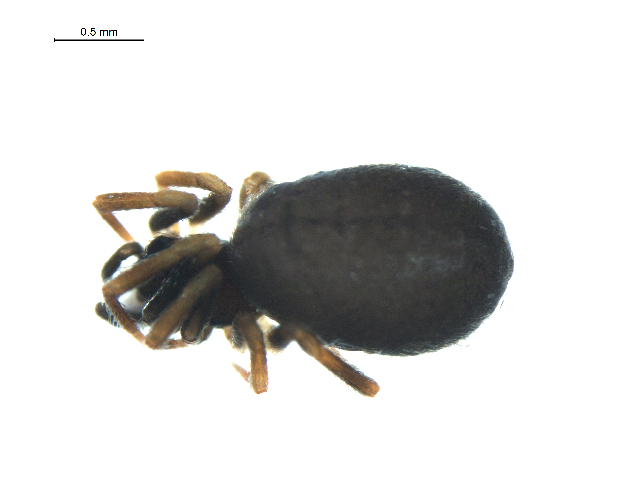
- L. prona, adult female

Scientific classification
- Kingdom: Animalia
- Phylum: Arthropoda
- Subphylum: Chelicerata
- Class: Arachnida
- Order: Araneae
- Infraorder: Araneomorphae
- Family: Theridiidae
- Genus: Lasaeola; Simon, 1881

Type species
- Pachydactylus prona (Menge, 1868)

Species
- 36, see text

Synonyms
- Pselothorax Chamberlin, 1949

= Lasaeola =

Lasaeola Temporal range: Palaeogene– Present

Genus of spiders

Lasaeola is a genus of comb-footed spiders that was first described by Eugène Louis Simon in 1881. The type species was described under the name Pachydactylus pronus, but was renamed Lasaeola prona when it was discovered that the name "Pachydactylus" was preoccupied. Both this genus and Deliana were removed from the synonymy of Dipoena in 1988, but many of these species require more study before their placement is certain.

== Species ==
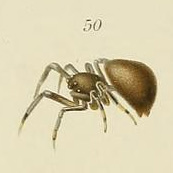
female L. castrata

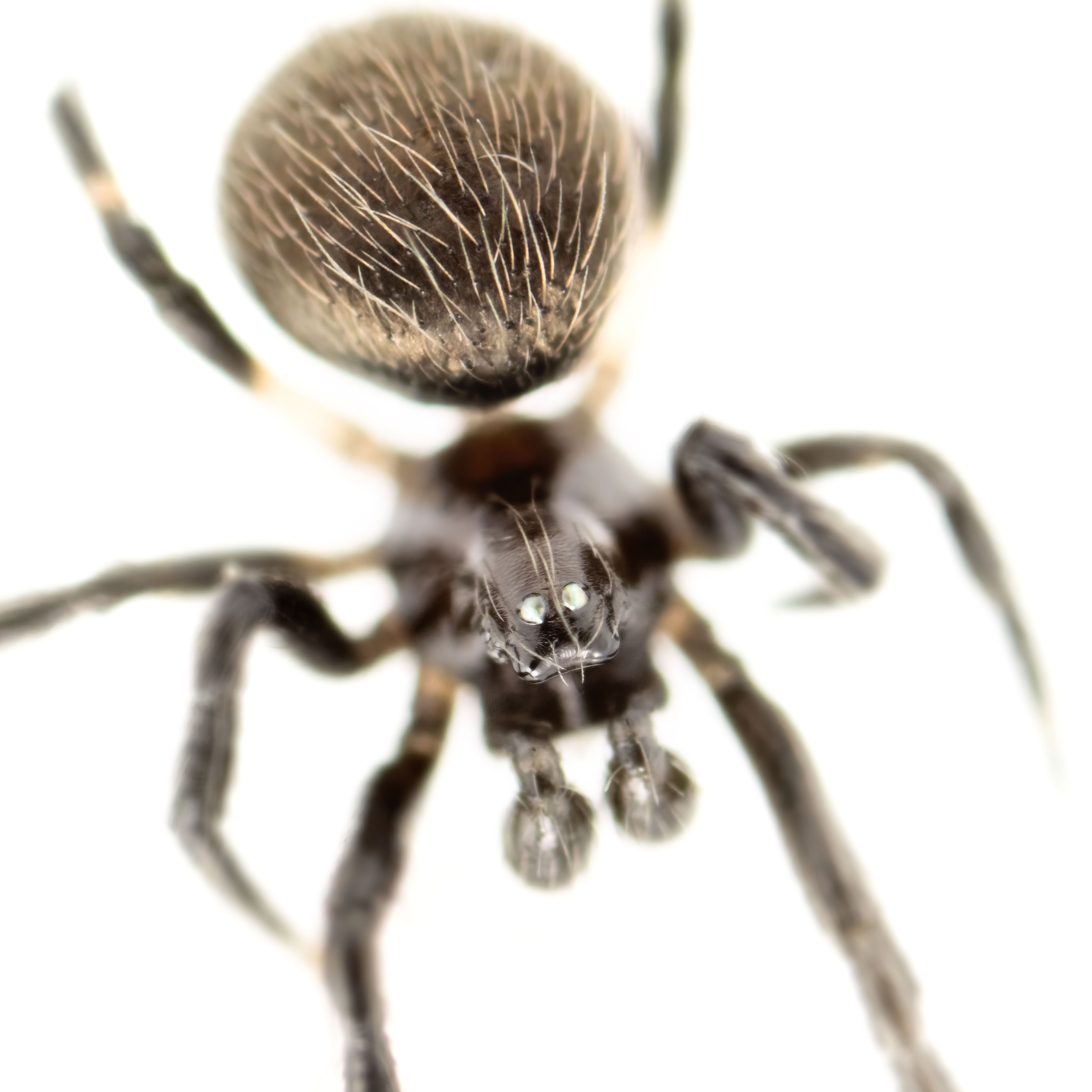
male L. tristis

As of September 2025 it contains thirty-six species, found in the Americas, Europe, and Asia:

- Lasaeola algarvensis Wunderlich, 2011 – Portugal
- Lasaeola armona Wunderlich, 2015 – Portugal, Spain
- Lasaeola atopa (Chamberlin, 1949) – USA
- Lasaeola bequaerti (Chickering, 1948) – Panama
- Lasaeola canariensis (Wunderlich, 1987) – Canary Is.
- Lasaeola castrata (Bösenberg & Strand, 1906) – Russia (Far East), China, Korea, Japan
- Lasaeola complexa (Gao & Li, 2014) – China
- Lasaeola convexa (Blackwall, 1870) – Mediterranean
- Lasaeola coracina (C. L. Koch, 1837) – Western Europe to Ukraine, Iran
- Lasaeola dbari Kovblyuk, Marusik & Omelko, 2012 – Turkey, Russia (Europe), Georgia
- Lasaeola donaldi (Chickering, 1943) – Panama, Venezuela
- Lasaeola fastigata Zhang, Liu & Zhang, 2011 – China
- Lasaeola flavitarsis (Wunderlich, 1992) – Canary Is.
- Lasaeola grancanariensis (Wunderlich, 1987) – Canary Is.
- Lasaeola lunata Zhang, Liu & Zhang, 2011 – China
- Lasaeola maculosa (Yoshida & Ono, 2000) – Turkey, Caucasus (Georgia, Azerbaijan), India, China, Korea, Japan
- Lasaeola minutissima Wunderlich, 2011 – Portugal, Spain
- Lasaeola mutilata (Bösenberg & Strand, 1906) – Korea, Japan
- Lasaeola oceanica Simon, 1883 – Azores
- Lasaeola octoginta Wunderlich, 2020 – Portugal
- Lasaeola okinawana (Yoshida & Ono, 2000) – China, Japan (Ryukyu Is.)
- Lasaeola pinna Tang, F. Liu, Z. Y. Liu, Yang & Peng, 2024 – China
- Lasaeola prona (Menge, 1868) (type) – North America, Europe, Caucasus, Russia (Europe to South Siberia), Kazakhstan, Iran, Japan
- Lasaeola spinithorax (Keyserling, 1886) – Peru
- Lasaeola striata (Wunderlich, 1987) – Canary Is.
- Lasaeola superba (Chickering, 1948) – Mexico, Panama
- Lasaeola tengchongensis Tang, F. Liu, Z. Y. Liu, Yang & Peng, 2024 – China
- Lasaeola testaceomarginata Simon, 1881 – Mediterranean
- Lasaeola tristis (Hahn, 1833) – Europe, Turkey, Russia (Europe to South Siberia), Kazakhstan, Iran, Central Asia
- Lasaeola wangi (Zhu, 1998) – China, Korea
- Lasaeola weidingguo (Lin & Li, 2024) – Vietnam
- Lasaeola xuanzan (Lin & Li, 2024) – China
- Lasaeola yona (Yoshida & Ono, 2000) – Japan (Ryukyu Is.)
- Lasaeola yoshidai (Ono, 1991) – Russia (Far East), China, Korea, Japan

In synonymy:

- L. daltoni (Levi, 1953) = Lasaeola atopa (Chamberlin, 1949)
- L. hamata (Tullgren, 1949) = Lasaeola prona (Menge, 1868)
- L. jucunda O. Pickard-Cambridge, 1904 = Lasaeola prona (Menge, 1868)
- L. longisternum (Bösenberg & Strand, 1906) = Lasaeola mutilata (Bösenberg & Strand, 1906)
- L. nigrina Simon, 1881 = Lasaeola coracina (C. L. Koch, 1837)
- L. pilula (Simon, 1873) = Lasaeola convexa (Blackwall, 1870)
- L. tibiale (Hahn, 1831) = Lasaeola tristis (Hahn, 1833)
- L. trapezoidalis (Levy & Amitai, 1981) = Lasaeola convexa (Blackwall, 1870)
- L. tristis hissariensis (Charitonov, 1951) = Lasaeola tristis (Hahn, 1833)
- L. uniforma (Bösenberg & Strand, 1906) = Lasaeola castrata (Bösenberg & Strand, 1906)
