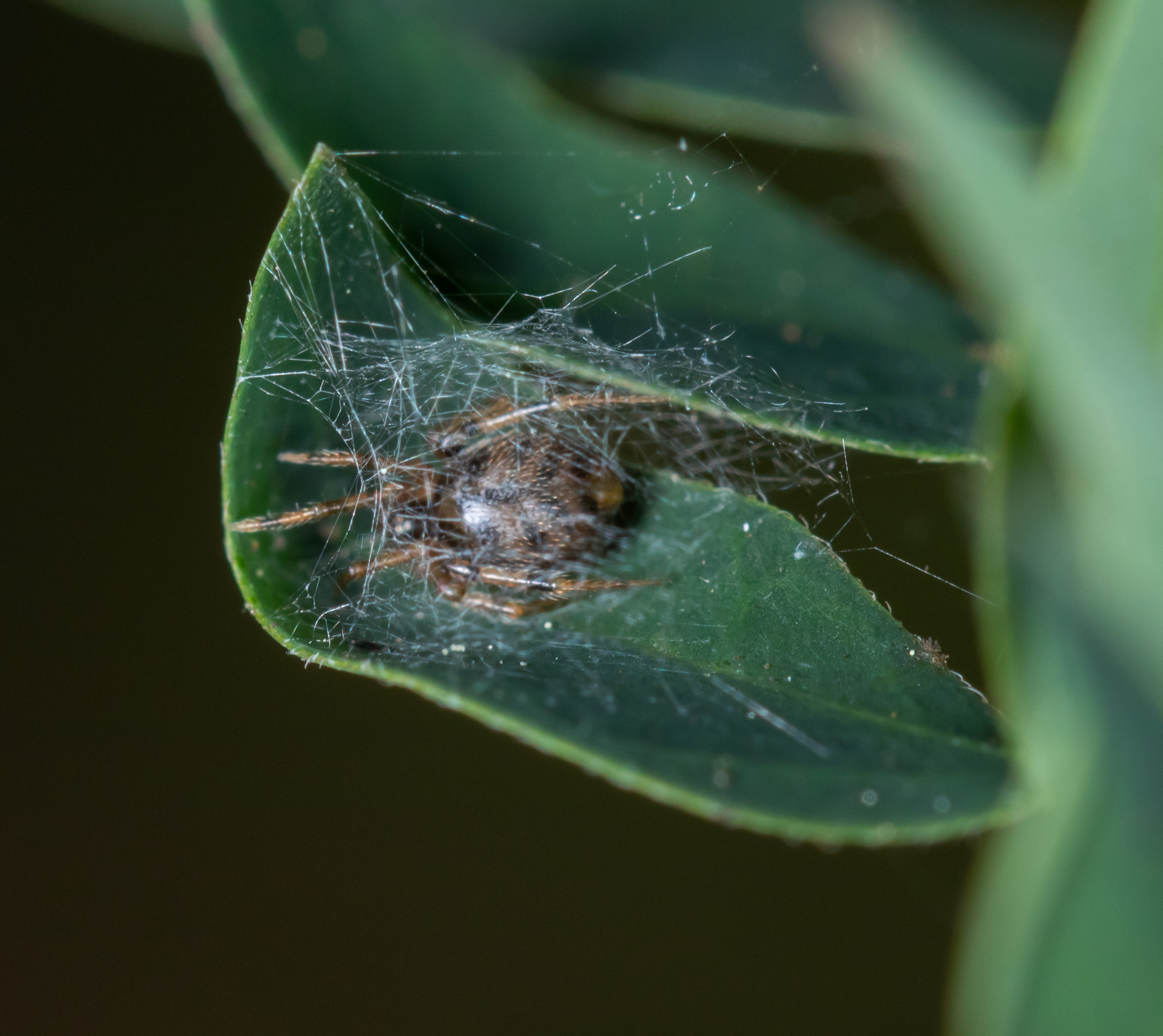
- female from Thailand
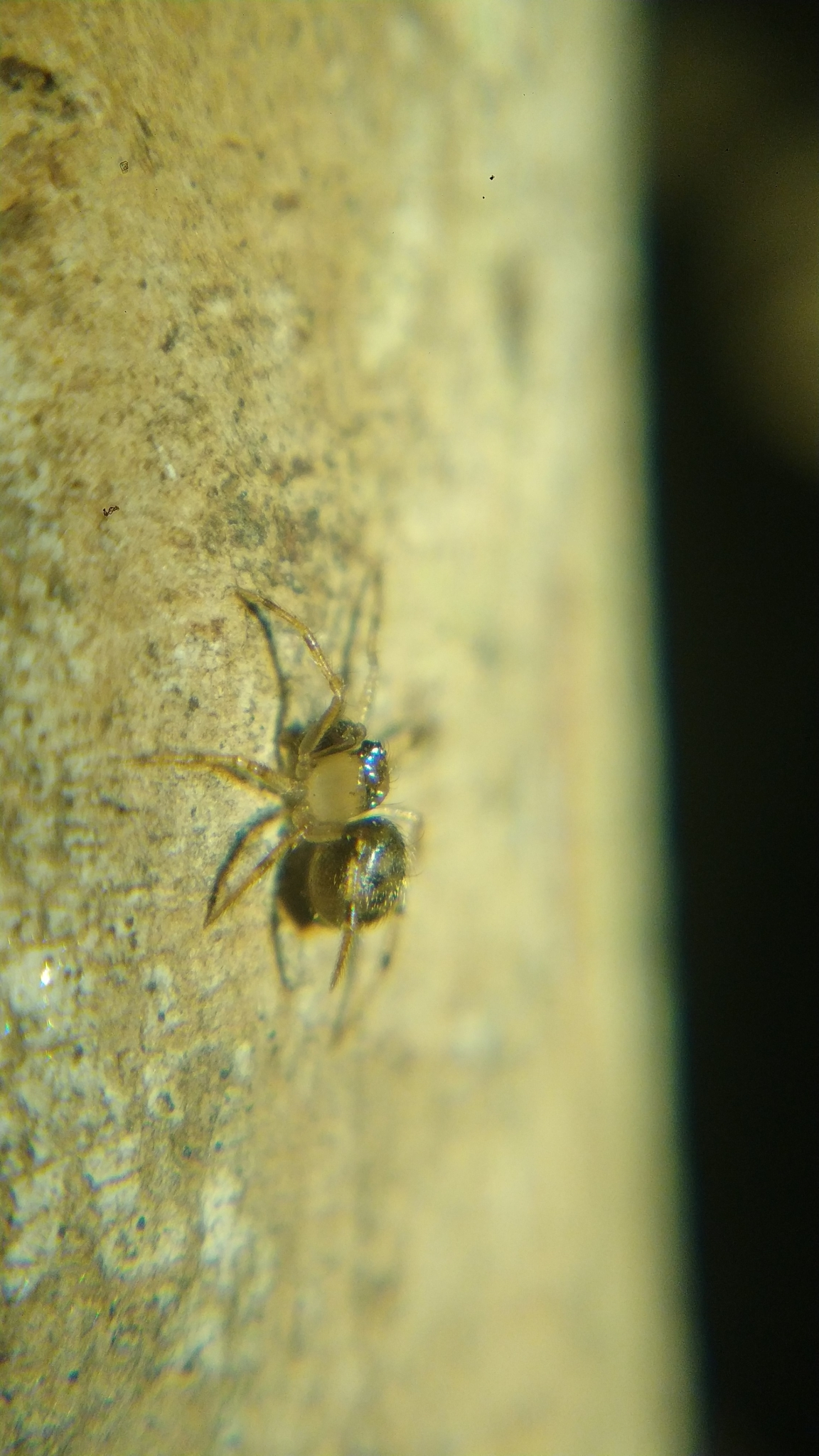
- male from Thailand

Scientific classification
- Kingdom: Animalia
- Phylum: Arthropoda
- Subphylum: Chelicerata
- Class: Arachnida
- Order: Araneae
- Infraorder: Araneomorphae
- Family: Theridiidae
- Genus: Phycosoma
- Species: P. hana

Binomial name
- Phycosoma hana (Zhu, 1998)

Synonyms
- Dipoena hana Zhu, 1998

= Phycosoma hana =

Species of spider

Phycosoma hana is a species of spider in the family Theridiidae. It was described from China, where it is known from Hainan Island.

== Taxonomy ==
The species was originally described as Dipoena hana by Zhu in 1998. It was later transferred to the genus Phycosoma by Zhang & Zhang in 2012, who also provided the first description of the male.

== Distribution ==
P. hana has been found on Hainan Island in southern China. It has been recorded from several mountain locations including Jianfengling Mountain, Bawangling Mountain, Diaoluo Mountain, Qixianling Mountain, and Limu Mountain. There are also observations from Thailand and Indonesia.

== Habitat ==
The species inhabits grassland environments.

== Description ==
Phycosoma hana is a small spider with distinctive sexual dimorphism. Males have a total body length of 1.73–1.80 mm, while females are slightly larger at 1.98–2.25 mm.

The carapace is yellow with a darkish antero-median region and deep thoracic groove. Each eye is surrounded by a black ring. The legs are yellow with darkish patches on the femora, patellae, tibiae and metatarsi.

Males can be distinguished from other Phycosoma species by their distinctive opisthosoma color pattern, which is yellowish dorsally with five pairs of black patches laterally and a central black patch. The ventral surface is dark brown with irregular brown patches.

Females can be distinguished from most other Phycosoma species by their wide, U-shaped scapus in the epigyne. They differ from closely related species P. flavomarginatum, P. hainanensis, and P. digitula by specific details of the copulatory ducts and their connections to the spermathecae.
