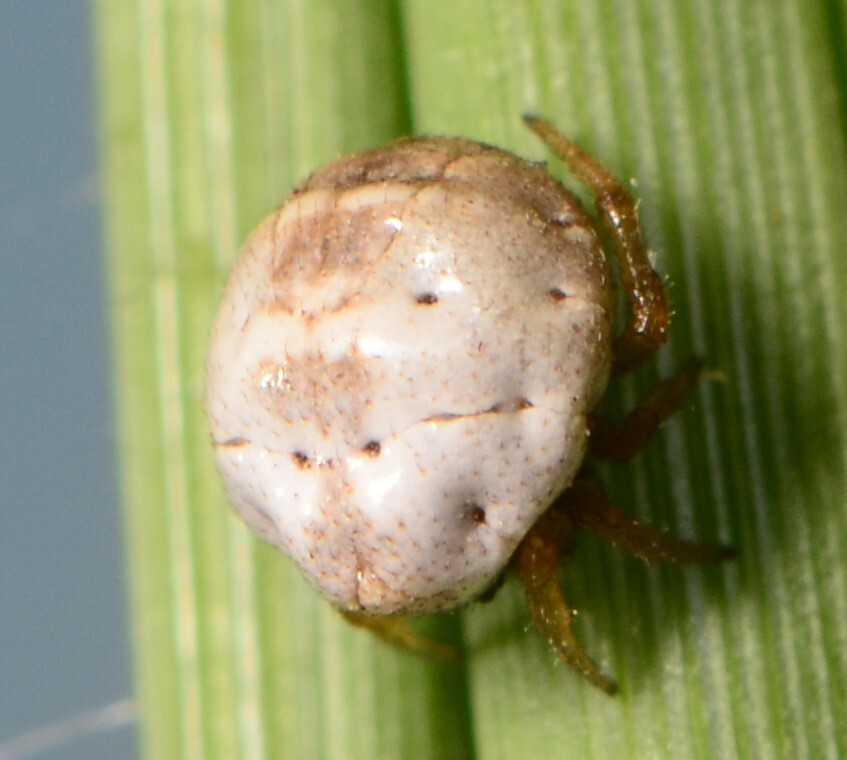
- female P. eburnea
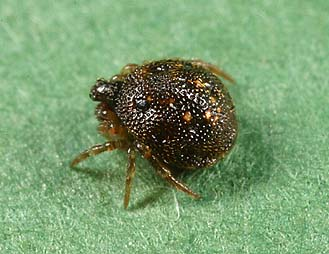
- male P. ryukyuensis

Scientific classification
- Kingdom: Animalia
- Phylum: Arthropoda
- Subphylum: Chelicerata
- Class: Arachnida
- Order: Araneae
- Infraorder: Araneomorphae
- Family: Theridiidae
- Genus: Phoroncidia; Westwood, 1835

Type species
- P. aculeata Westwood, 1835

Species
- 83, see text

Synonyms
- Sudabe Karsch, 1879; Trithena Simon, 1867; Ulesanis L. Koch, 1872; Wibrada Keyserling, 1886

= Phoroncidia =

Genus of spiders

Phoroncidia is a genus of comb-footed spiders that was first described by J. O. Westwood in 1835.

== Description ==
Males measure 1 to 4.5 mm, while females range from 1.3 to 8.5 mm.

The carapace has an eye region projecting above the clypeus. The chelicerae are small with a pair of strong hairs. The abdomen varies in shape, being heavily sclerotized and often leathery, with pronounced folds or humps or with strong spines, tubercles, or extensions. A sclerotized ring surrounds the spinnerets.

The legs are short, with the fourth leg usually longer than the first.

== Species ==
As of October 2025, this genus includes 83 species and one subspecies:

- Phoroncidia aciculata Thorell, 1877 – Indonesia (Sulawesi)
- Phoroncidia aculeata Westwood, 1835 – India, China (type species)
- Phoroncidia alishanensis Chen, 1990 – Taiwan
- Phoroncidia altiventris Yoshida, 1985 – Korea, Japan
- Phoroncidia alveolata (Simon, 1903) – Equatorial Guinea
- Phoroncidia ambatolahy Kariko, 2014 – Madagascar
- Phoroncidia americana (Emerton, 1882) – Canada, United States, Cuba, Jamaica
- Phoroncidia argoides (Doleschall, 1857) – Indonesia (Ambon)
- Phoroncidia aurata O. Pickard-Cambridge, 1877 – Madagascar
- Phoroncidia bifrons (Simon, 1895) – Philippines
- Phoroncidia biocellata (Simon, 1893) – Brazil
- Phoroncidia bukolana Barrion & Litsinger, 1995 – Philippines
- Phoroncidia capensis (Simon, 1895) – South Africa
- Phoroncidia chelys (L. Koch, 1872) – Fiji
- Phoroncidia cibagou Gan, Mi & Wang, 2025 – China
- Phoroncidia concave Yin & Xu, 2012 – China
- Phoroncidia coracina (Simon, 1899) – Indonesia (Sumatra)
- Phoroncidia cribrata (Simon, 1893) – Paraguay
- Phoroncidia crustula Zhu, 1998 – China (Hainan)
- Phoroncidia cygnea (Hickman, 1951) – Australia (Tasmania)
- Phoroncidia dino Vanuytven, 2022 – Papua New Guinea
- Phoroncidia eburnea (Simon, 1895) – South Africa, Eswatini
- Phoroncidia ellenbergeri Berland, 1913 – Gabon
- Phoroncidia escalerai (Simon, 1903) – Equatorial Guinea
- Phoroncidia flavolimbata (Simon, 1893) – Ecuador
- Phoroncidia floripara Gao & Li, 2014 – China
- Phoroncidia fumosa (Nicolet, 1849) – Chile
- Phoroncidia gayi (Nicolet, 1849) – Chile
- Phoroncidia gira Levi, 1964 – Venezuela
- Phoroncidia hankiewiczi (Kulczyński, 1911) – Portugal, Spain, France
- Phoroncidia hexacantha Thorell, 1890 – Indonesia (Sumatra)
- Phoroncidia jacobsoni (Reimoser, 1925) – Indonesia (Sumatra)
- Phoroncidia kibonotensis (Tullgren, 1910) – Kenya, Tanzania
  - P. k. concolor (Caporiacco, 1949) – Kenya
- Phoroncidia levii Chrysanthus, 1963 – Indonesia (New Guinea)
- Phoroncidia longiceps (Keyserling, 1886) – Brazil
- Phoroncidia lygeana (Walckenaer, 1841) – Malaysia, Indonesia (Sumatra, Java, Borneo)
- Phoroncidia maindroni (Simon, 1905) – India
- Phoroncidia minlangi Lin & Li, 2023 – China
- Phoroncidia minuta (Spassky, 1932) – Georgia, Azerbaijan, Iran
- Phoroncidia moyobamba Levi, 1964 – Peru, Brazil
- Phoroncidia musiva (Simon, 1880) – New Caledonia
- Phoroncidia nasuta (O. Pickard-Cambridge, 1873) – Sri Lanka, Taiwan, Japan
- Phoroncidia nicoleti (Roewer, 1942) – Chile
- Phoroncidia nicoleti Levi, 1964 – Chile
- Phoroncidia oahuensis (Simon, 1900) – Hawaii
- Phoroncidia paradoxa (Lucas, 1846) – Southern Europe, North Africa, Turkey
- Phoroncidia pennata (Nicolet, 1849) – Chile
- Phoroncidia personata (L. Koch, 1872) – Samoa
- Phoroncidia pilula (Karsch, 1879) – Georgia, Russia (Far East), China, Korea, Japan
- Phoroncidia pilula (Simon, 1895) – Tanzania (Zanzibar)
- Phoroncidia piratini Rodrigues & Marques, 2010 – Brazil
- Phoroncidia pukeiwa (Marples, 1955) – New Zealand
- Phoroncidia puketoru (Marples, 1955) – New Zealand
- Phoroncidia puyehue Levi, 1967 – Chile
- Phoroncidia quadrata (O. Pickard-Cambridge, 1880) – New Zealand
- Phoroncidia ravot Levi, 1964 – Venezuela
- Phoroncidia reimoseri Levi, 1964 – Brazil
- Phoroncidia roseleviorum Kariko, 2014 – Madagascar
- Phoroncidia rotunda (Keyserling, 1890) – Australia (Queensland, Lord Howe Is.), Samoa
- Phoroncidia rubens Thorell, 1899 – Cameroon
- Phoroncidia rubroargentea Berland, 1913 – Madagascar
- Phoroncidia rubromaculata (Keyserling, 1886) – Brazil
- Phoroncidia ryukyuensis Yoshida, 1979 – Taiwan, Japan (Ryukyu Is.)
- Phoroncidia saboya Levi, 1964 – Colombia
- Phoroncidia scutellata (Taczanowski, 1879) – Peru
- Phoroncidia scutula (Nicolet, 1849) – Bolivia, Chile
- Phoroncidia septemaculeata O. Pickard-Cambridge, 1873 – India, Sri Lanka, Malaysia
- Phoroncidia sextuberculata (Keyserling, 1890) – Australia (Queensland)
- Phoroncidia sjostedti Tullgren, 1910 – Tanzania
- Phoroncidia spissa (Nicolet, 1849) – Chile
- Phoroncidia splendida Thorell, 1899 – West Africa
- Phoroncidia studo Levi, 1964 – Peru, Brazil
- Phoroncidia testudo (O. Pickard-Cambridge, 1873) – India, Sri Lanka
- Phoroncidia thwaitesi O. Pickard-Cambridge, 1869 – Sri Lanka
- Phoroncidia tina Levi, 1964 – Brazil
- Phoroncidia tricuspidata (Blackwall, 1863) – Brazil
- Phoroncidia trituberculata (Hickman, 1951) – Australia (Tasmania)
- Phoroncidia triunfo Levi, 1964 – Mexico to Costa Rica
- Phoroncidia truncatula (Strand, 1909) – South Africa
- Phoroncidia umbrosa (Nicolet, 1849) – Chile
- Phoroncidia variabilis (Nicolet, 1849) – Chile
- Phoroncidia vatoharanana Kariko, 2014 – Madagascar
- Phoroncidia wrightae Kariko, 2014 – Madagascar

Formerly included:

- P. flavomaculata (Keyserling, 1891) (Transferred to Dipoena)
- P. sudabides (Bösenberg & Strand, 1906) (Transferred to Chrosiothes)

Nomen dubium

- P. quadrispinella Strand, 1907
