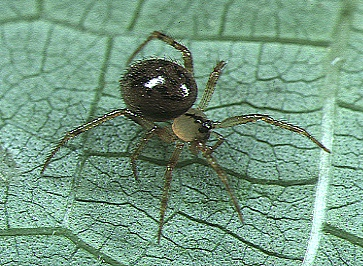
- female from Okinawa
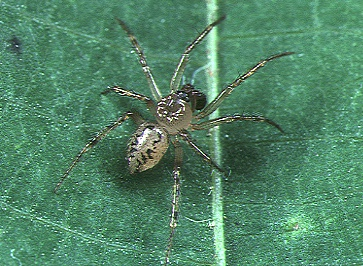
- male from Okinawa

Scientific classification
- Kingdom: Animalia
- Phylum: Arthropoda
- Subphylum: Chelicerata
- Class: Arachnida
- Order: Araneae
- Infraorder: Araneomorphae
- Family: Theridiidae
- Genus: Phycosoma
- Species: P. mustelinum

Binomial name
- Phycosoma mustelinum (Simon, 1889)

Synonyms
- Euryopis mustelina Simon, 1889; Dipoena mustelina (Yaginuma, 1967); Trigonobothrys mustelinus (Yoshida, 2002)

= Phycosoma mustelinum =

Species of spider

Phycosoma mustelinum is a species of spider in the family Theridiidae. It was originally described as Euryopis mustelina by Eugène Simon in 1889. The species has undergone several taxonomic changes, being transferred through the genera Dipoena and Trigonobothrys before being placed in its current genus Phycosoma.

== Etymology ==
The specific epithet mustelinum derives from the Latin mustelinus, meaning "weasel-like" (from mustela, weasel).

== Taxonomy ==
The species was first described by Eugène Simon in 1889 as Euryopis mustelina. In 1967, Yaginuma transferred the female to the genus Dipoena while describing the male for the first time. Yoshida moved the species to Trigonobothrys in 2002, and it was subsequently transferred to its current placement in Phycosoma by Yoshida in 2009.

== Distribution ==
P. mustelinum is distributed across eastern Asia, including Russia (Far East), China, Korea, Japan, and Indonesia (Krakatau). The species has been recorded from various provinces throughout Korea and from multiple prefectures in Japan.

== Habitat ==
The spider inhabits mountainous areas where it wanders among branches, leaves, and meadows. It catches prey by spreading spider silk rather than constructing elaborate webs.

== Description ==
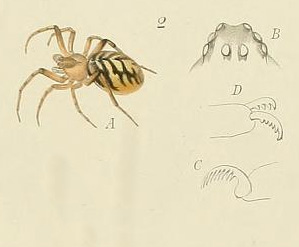
Diagnostic drawing of female from 1906 description

Phycosoma mustelinum exhibits typical Theridiidae characteristics, with a relatively small cephalothorax and enlarged opisthosoma.

=== Female ===
Female body length ranges from 3.5–4.5 mm. The carapace is reddish brown to yellowish brown, oval-shaped and longer than wide. The head region is notably dark, with distinct blackish brown cervical and radial furrows and a needle-shaped longitudinal fovea. The clypeus is concave.

The eye region is black, with eight eyes arranged in two rows. The anterior eye row is strongly recurved while the posterior eye row is slightly recurved or nearly straight when viewed from above. The sternum is turbid yellowish brown and inverted-triangular in shape, longer than wide, with turbid blackish brown mottled margins.

The abdomen is oval with the anterior part protruding over the carapace. The dorsal surface is blackish brown to black with a pair of yellowish brown round markings at the anteromesal part, a yellowish brown serrated pattern at the middle, and two pairs of large and small light spots on the lateral sides. Color and pattern variations have been observed. The epigyne is simple and sclerotized, with a visible pair of spermathecae and pincer-like copulatory ducts.

=== Male ===
Male body length ranges from 2.5–3.5 mm. Males are similar to females but smaller overall with darker body coloration and long, slender, well-developed legs. The carapace is round and very high with a strongly depressed center in the blackish brown head region. The clypeus is almost straight and the abdomen is oval without a scutum. The pedipalp features a very small embolus and conductor, with a broad median apophysis.
