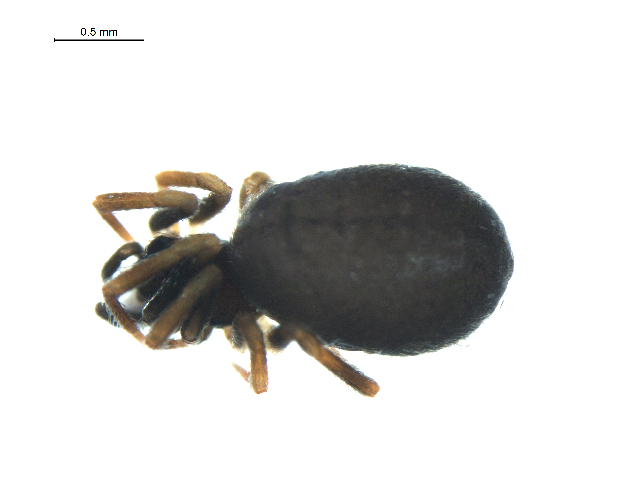

Scientific classification
- Kingdom: Animalia
- Phylum: Arthropoda
- Subphylum: Chelicerata
- Class: Arachnida
- Order: Araneae
- Infraorder: Araneomorphae
- Family: Theridiidae
- Genus: Lasaeola
- Species: L. prona

Binomial name
- Lasaeola prona (Menge, 1868)

Synonyms
- Pachydactylus pronus Menge, 1868; Dipoena hamata Tullgren, 1949; Dipoena prona; Lasaeola prona — Yoshida, 2002

= Lasaeola prona =

Species of spider

Lasaeola prona is a tangle web spider species with Holarctic distribution. It is notably found in Lithuania.

It is the type species of the genus Lasaeola. The type locality is Weichselmünde forest near Gdansk, Poland.
