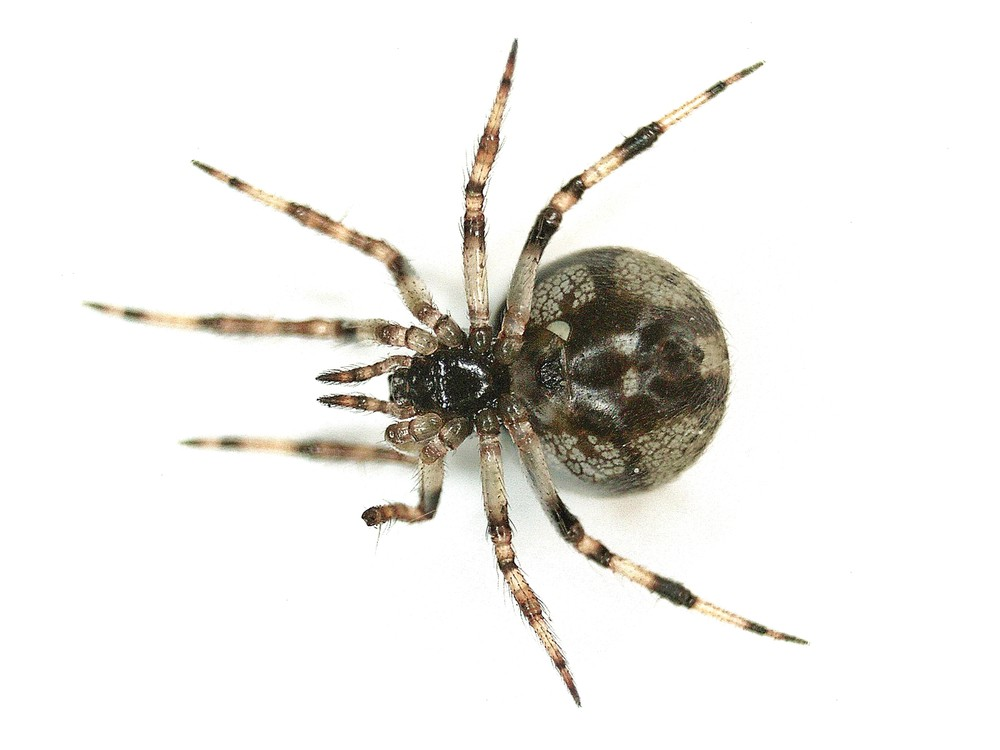
- female from the Netherlands

Scientific classification
- Kingdom: Animalia
- Phylum: Arthropoda
- Subphylum: Chelicerata
- Class: Arachnida
- Order: Araneae
- Infraorder: Araneomorphae
- Family: Theridiidae
- Genus: Dipoena
- Species: D. melanogaster

Binomial name
- Dipoena melanogaster (C. L. Koch, 1837)

Synonyms
- Atea melanogaster C. L. Koch, 1837; Theridion congener O. Pickard-Cambridge, 1863; Theridion melanogaster (C. L. Koch, 1837)

= Dipoena melanogaster =

Species of spider

Dipoena melanogaster is a species of cobweb spider in the family Theridiidae. It has a wide distribution across Europe, North Africa, and extends eastward to Azerbaijan and Iran.

== Taxonomy ==
The species was originally described by Carl Ludwig Koch in 1837 as Atea melanogaster. It was later transferred to the genus Dipoena by Tamerlan Thorell in 1869. The species Theridion congener, described by Octavius Pickard-Cambridge in 1863, was later synonymized with D. melanogaster by the same author in 1871.

== Distribution ==
D. melanogaster has been recorded from across Europe, including the British Isles, Germany, France, Czech Republic, Poland, and Sweden. Its range extends into North Africa and eastward through the Caucasus to Azerbaijan and Iran.

== Habitat ==
This species is commonly found in woodland environments, particularly in coniferous forests where it builds its webs on shrubs and low trees. It is most active during the summer months of June and July when mature males with fully developed reproductive organs can be observed.

== Description ==
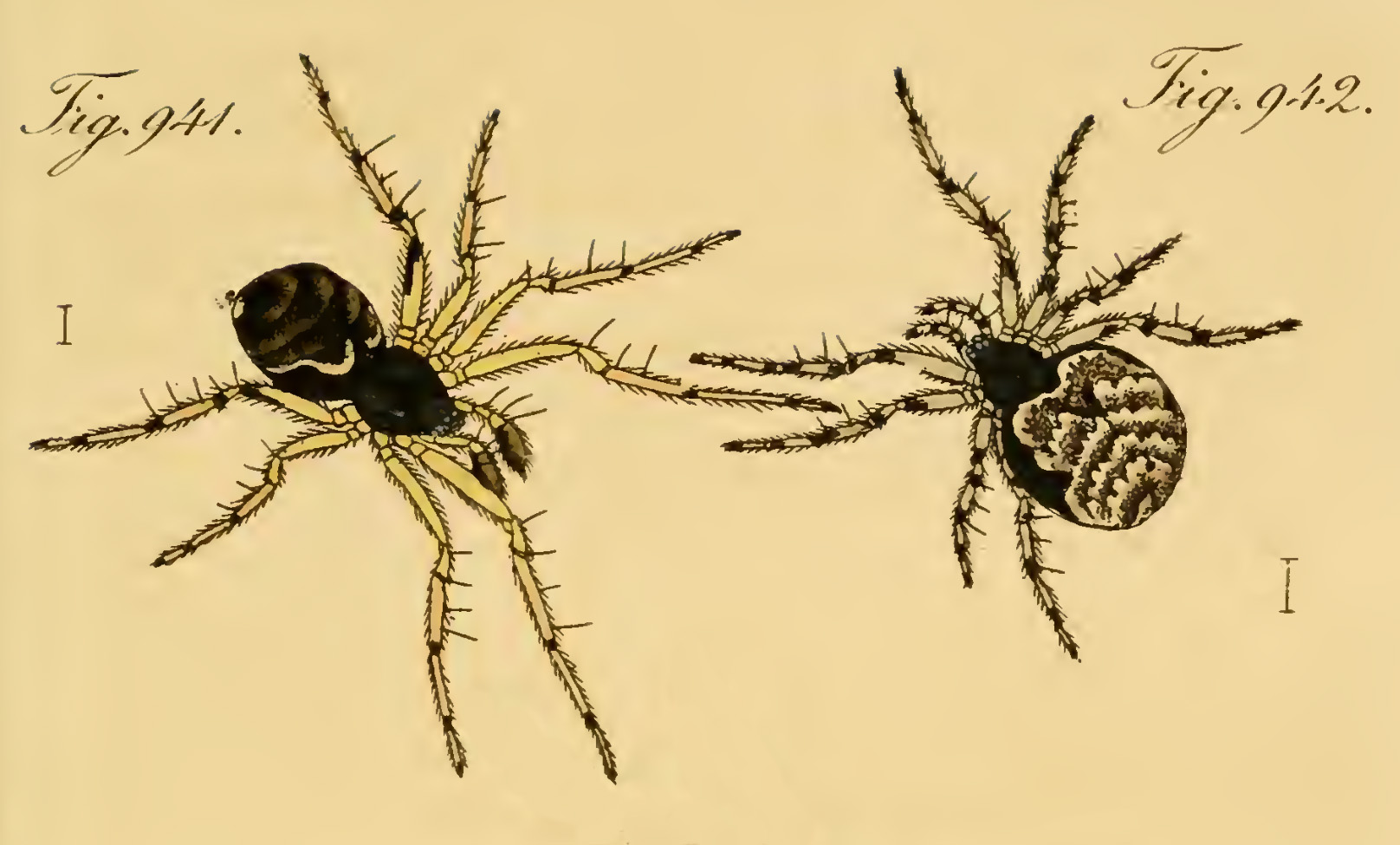
male and female from original description

Dipoena melanogaster is a small spider with a body length of approximately 1.5 mm. The front part of the body is brownish-black, while the rear part displays a distinctive coloration pattern. The front and sides of the abdomen are black, while the back is whitish with brown and black speckled markings arranged in curved crosswise stripes. The legs are whitish with black rings at the tips of the segments and at the joints.

Males are more slender than females, with a thinner abdomen and proportionally longer legs. The male's front body and mouthparts are black like the female, but the back of the abdomen is darker, appearing almost olive-brown, with visible black crosswise markings formed by clusters of spots.
