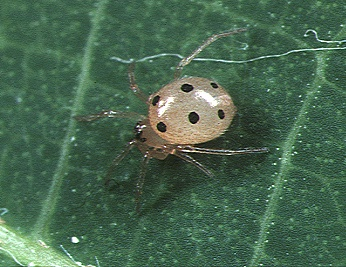
- female
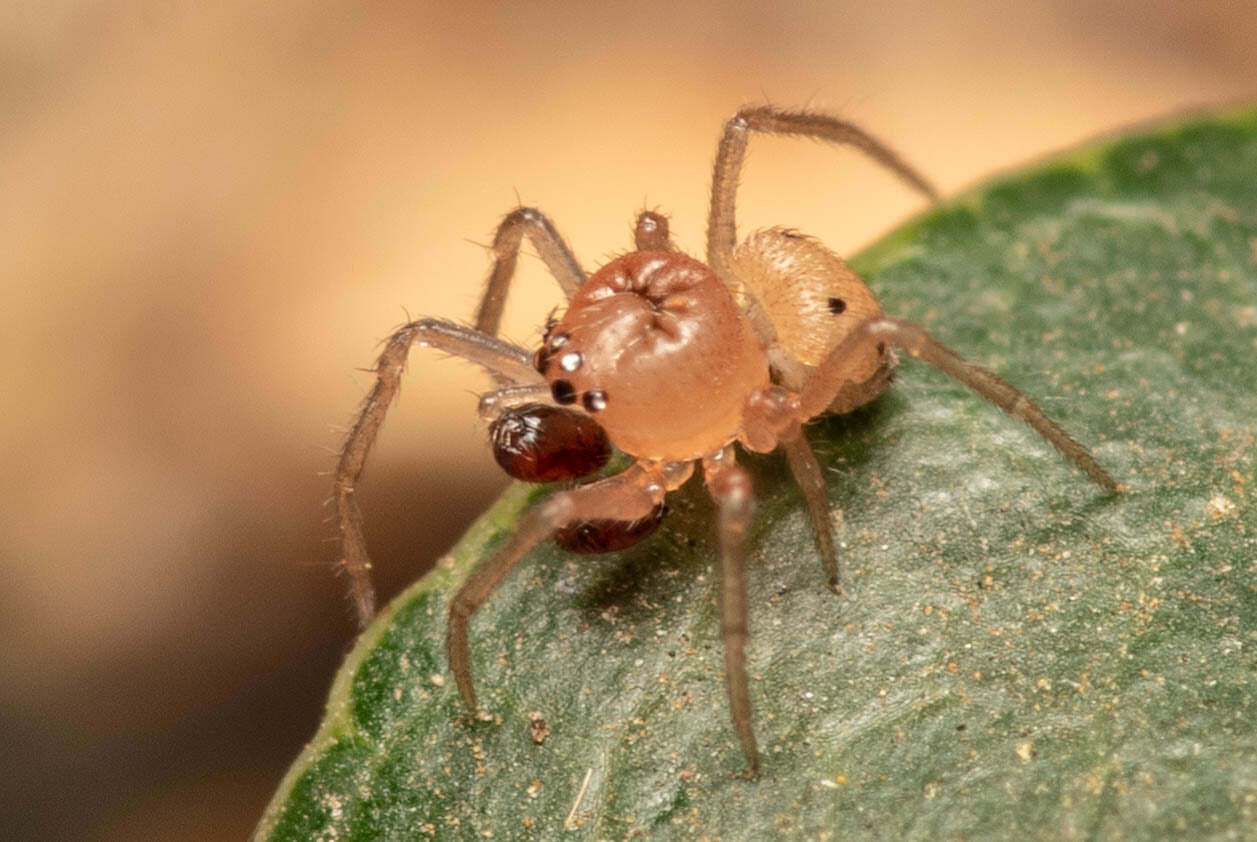
- male

Scientific classification
- Kingdom: Animalia
- Phylum: Arthropoda
- Subphylum: Chelicerata
- Class: Arachnida
- Order: Araneae
- Infraorder: Araneomorphae
- Family: Theridiidae
- Genus: Phycosoma
- Species: P. martinae

Binomial name
- Phycosoma martinae (Roberts, 1983)

Synonyms
- Dipoena martinae Roberts, 1983; Dipoena japonica Yoshida, 1991; Dipoena decamaculata Chen, Peng & Zhao, 1992; Dipoena ruedai Barrion & Litsinger, 1995; Dipoena coreana Paik, 1995; Trigonobothrys martinae Yoshida, 2002

= Phycosoma martinae =

Large-spots Comb-foot Spider

Species of spider

Phycosoma martinae is a species of spider in the family Theridiidae. It is found across Africa and Asia and is commonly known as the large-spots comb-foot spider.

== Distribution ==
Phycosoma martinae has a wide distribution across Africa and Asia. It is found in Kenya, Angola, South Africa, Seychelles, Madagascar, India, China, Korea, Japan (Ryukyu Islands), and the Philippines.

== Habitat and ecology ==
The species has been observed feeding on ants.

In South Africa, Phycosoma martinae inhabits multiple biomes including Fynbos, Grassland, Indian Ocean Coastal Belt, Savanna, and Thicket biomes at altitudes ranging from 6 to 1,556 m.

== Description ==
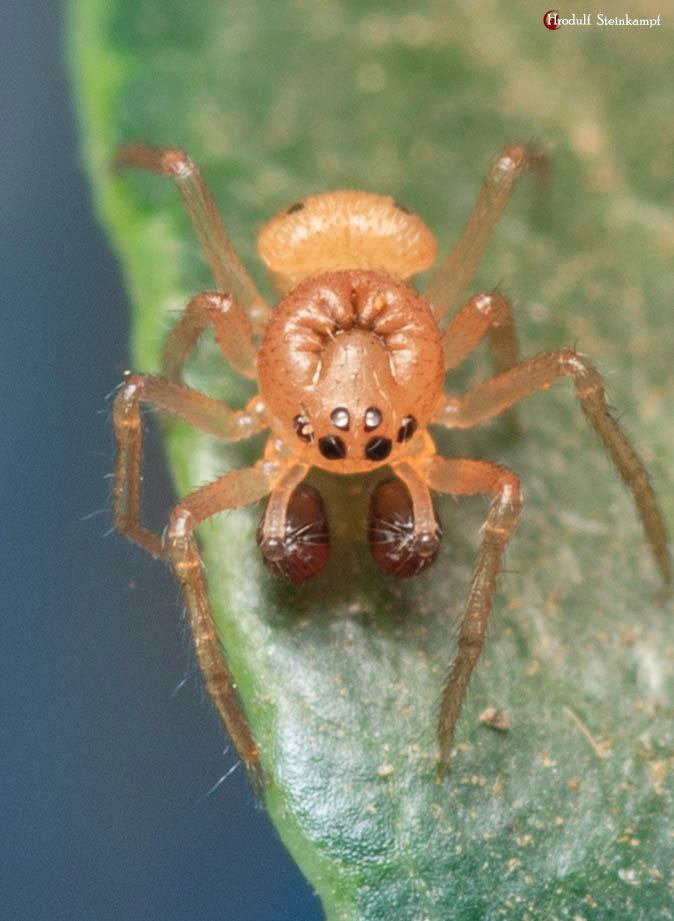
male

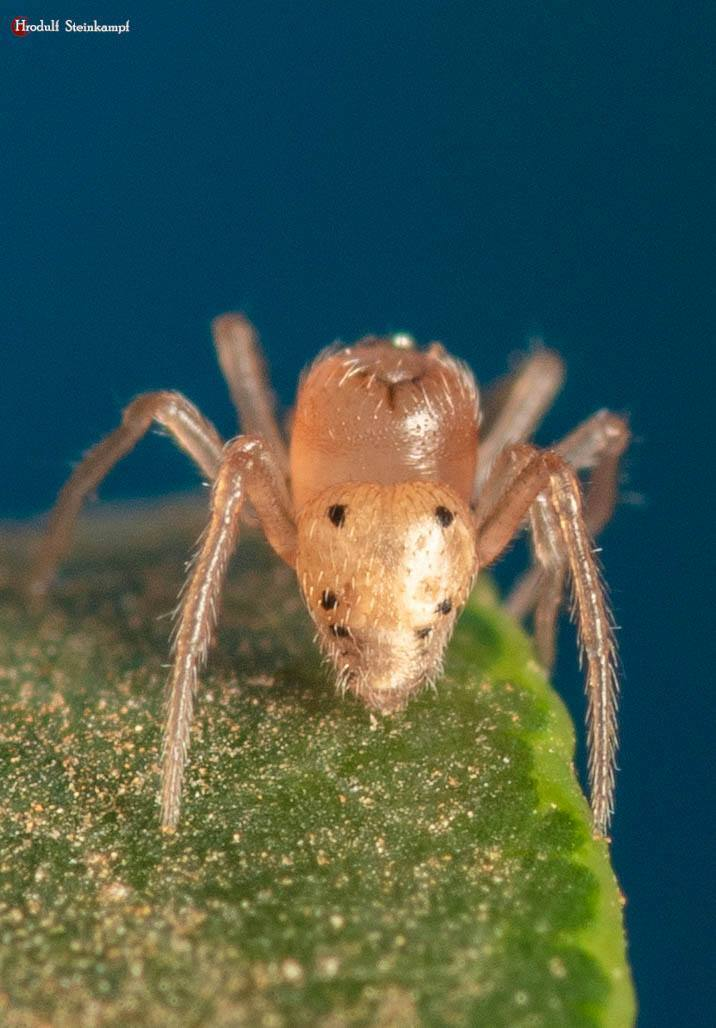
male

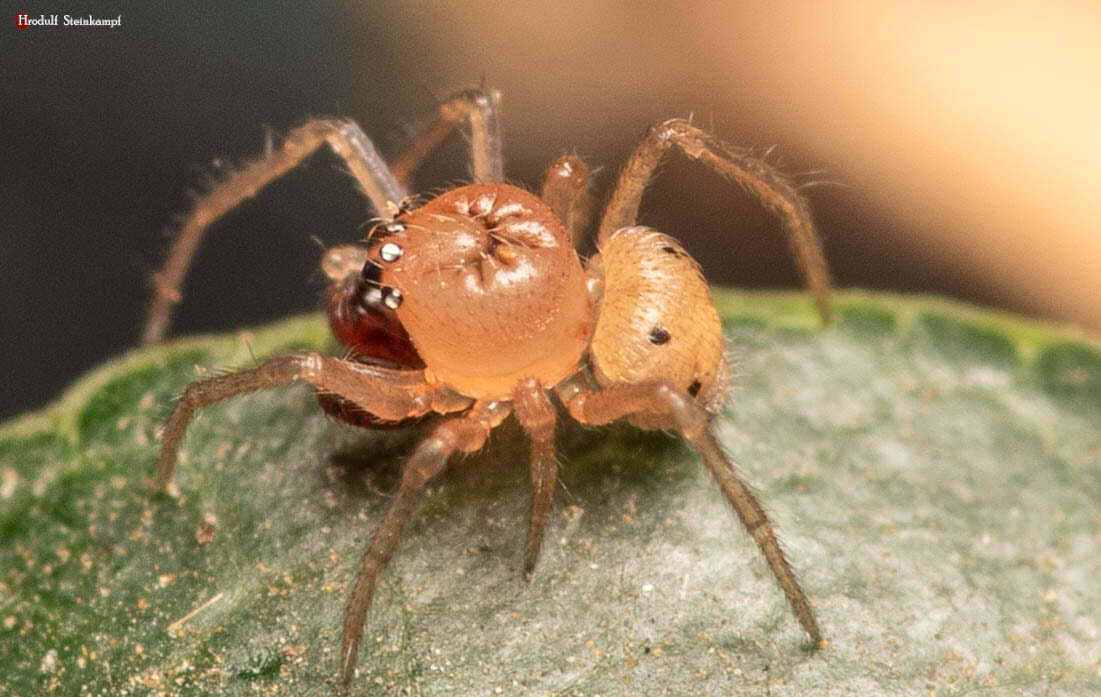
male

The species exhibits distinctive spotted markings on the abdomen.

== Conservation ==
Phycosoma martinae is listed as Least Concern due to its wide geographical range. The species is protected in more than 10 protected areas throughout South Africa.

== Taxonomy ==
Phycosoma martinae was originally described by Roberts in 1983 as Dipoena martinae from Aldabra Atoll in the Seychelles. The species was subsequently transferred to Trigonobothrys by Yoshida in 2002 and later to Phycosoma by Saaristo in 2006. Several species have been synonymized with P. martinae, including Dipoena decamaculata from China, D. ruedai from the Philippines, and D. coreana from Korea.
