= Dipoena sertata =

Scientific classification
- Kingdom: Animalia
- Phylum: Arthropoda
- Subphylum: Chelicerata
- Class: Arachnida
- Order: Araneae
- Infraorder: Araneomorphae
- Family: Theridiidae
- Genus: Dipoena
- Species: D. sertata

Binomial name
- Dipoena sertata (Simon, 1895)

Species of spider

Dipoena sertata, is a species of spider of the genus Dipoena. It is endemic to Sri Lanka.
