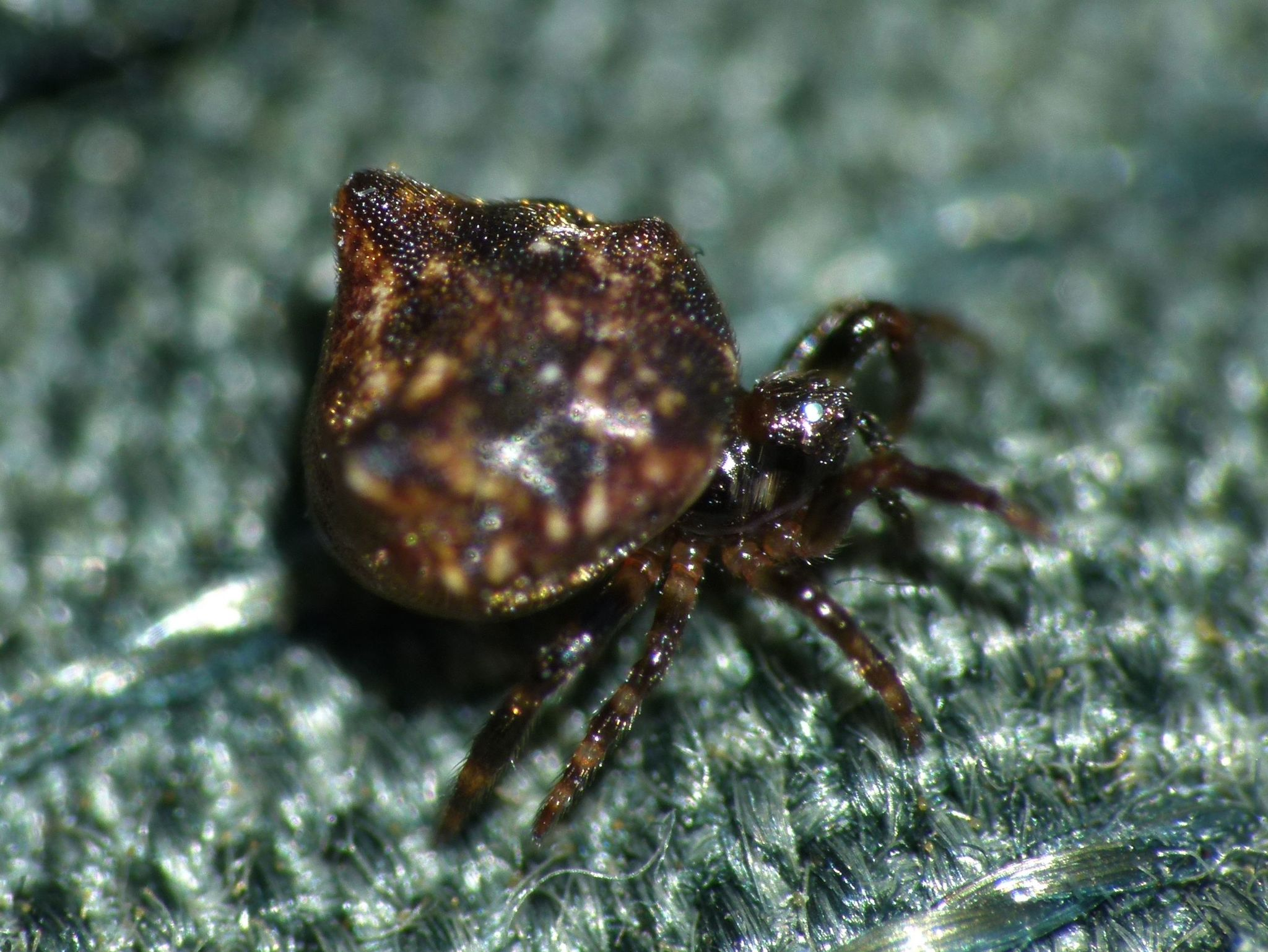
- Phoroncidia quandrata

Conservation status
- Not Threatened (NZ TCS)

Scientific classification
- Kingdom: Animalia
- Phylum: Arthropoda
- Subphylum: Chelicerata
- Class: Arachnida
- Order: Araneae
- Infraorder: Araneomorphae
- Family: Theridiidae
- Genus: Phoroncidia
- Species: P. quadrata

Binomial name
- Phoroncidia quadrata (O. Pickard-Cambridge, 1880)

Synonyms
- Stegosoma quadratum; Stegosoma lacunosa; Stegosoma excussa; Ulesanis quadrata; Ulesanis lacunosa; Ulesanis excussa; Ulesanis quadratum

= Phoroncidia quadrata =

Species of spider

Phoroncidia quadrata is a species of cobweb spider that is endemic to New Zealand.

== Taxonomy ==
This species was described in 1880 by Octavius Pickard-Cambridge from male and female specimens. It was moved to the Phoroncidia genus in 1983.

== Description ==
The male is recorded at 1.85mm in length whereas the female is 2.23mm.

== Distribution ==
This species is known from scattered localities throughout New Zealand.

== Conservation status ==
Under the New Zealand Threat Classification System, this species is listed as "Not Threatened".
