= Phoroncidia truncatula =

Mushroom Cob-Web Spider

Scientific classification
- Kingdom: Animalia
- Phylum: Arthropoda
- Subphylum: Chelicerata
- Class: Arachnida
- Order: Araneae
- Infraorder: Araneomorphae
- Family: Theridiidae
- Genus: Phoroncidia
- Species: P. truncatula

Binomial name
- Phoroncidia truncatula (Strand, 1909)

Synonyms
- Ulesanis truncatula Strand, 1909

Species of spider

Phoroncidia truncatula is a species of spider in the family Theridiidae. It is endemic to the Western Cape of South Africa and is commonly known as the mushroom cob-web spider.

== Distribution ==
Phoroncidia truncatula is endemic to South Africa, known only from Fish Hoek in the Western Cape province.

== Habitat and ecology ==
Phoroncidia truncatula inhabits areas at approximately 60 m above sea level. These rare spiders are sampled from vegetation. Nothing is known about their behaviour. The type locality is from the Fynbos biome.

== Conservation ==
Phoroncidia truncatula is listed as Data Deficient by the South African National Biodiversity Institute. The species is known only from the male at the type locality. The status of the species remains obscure and additional sampling is needed to collect females and to determine the species' range.
