= Phoroncidia americana =

Scientific classification
- Domain: Eukaryota
- Kingdom: Animalia
- Phylum: Arthropoda
- Subphylum: Chelicerata
- Class: Arachnida
- Order: Araneae
- Infraorder: Araneomorphae
- Family: Theridiidae
- Genus: Phoroncidia
- Species: P. americana

Binomial name
- Phoroncidia americana (Emerton, 1882)

Species of spider

Phoroncidia americana is a species of cobweb spider in the family Theridiidae. It is found in the United States, Canada, Cuba, and Jamaica.
