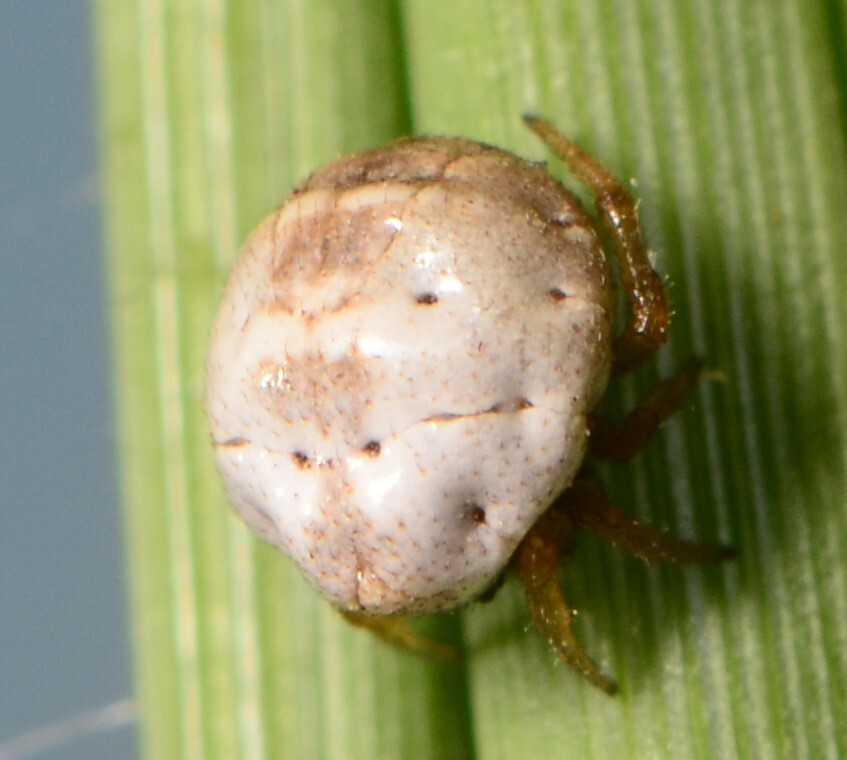
- Female
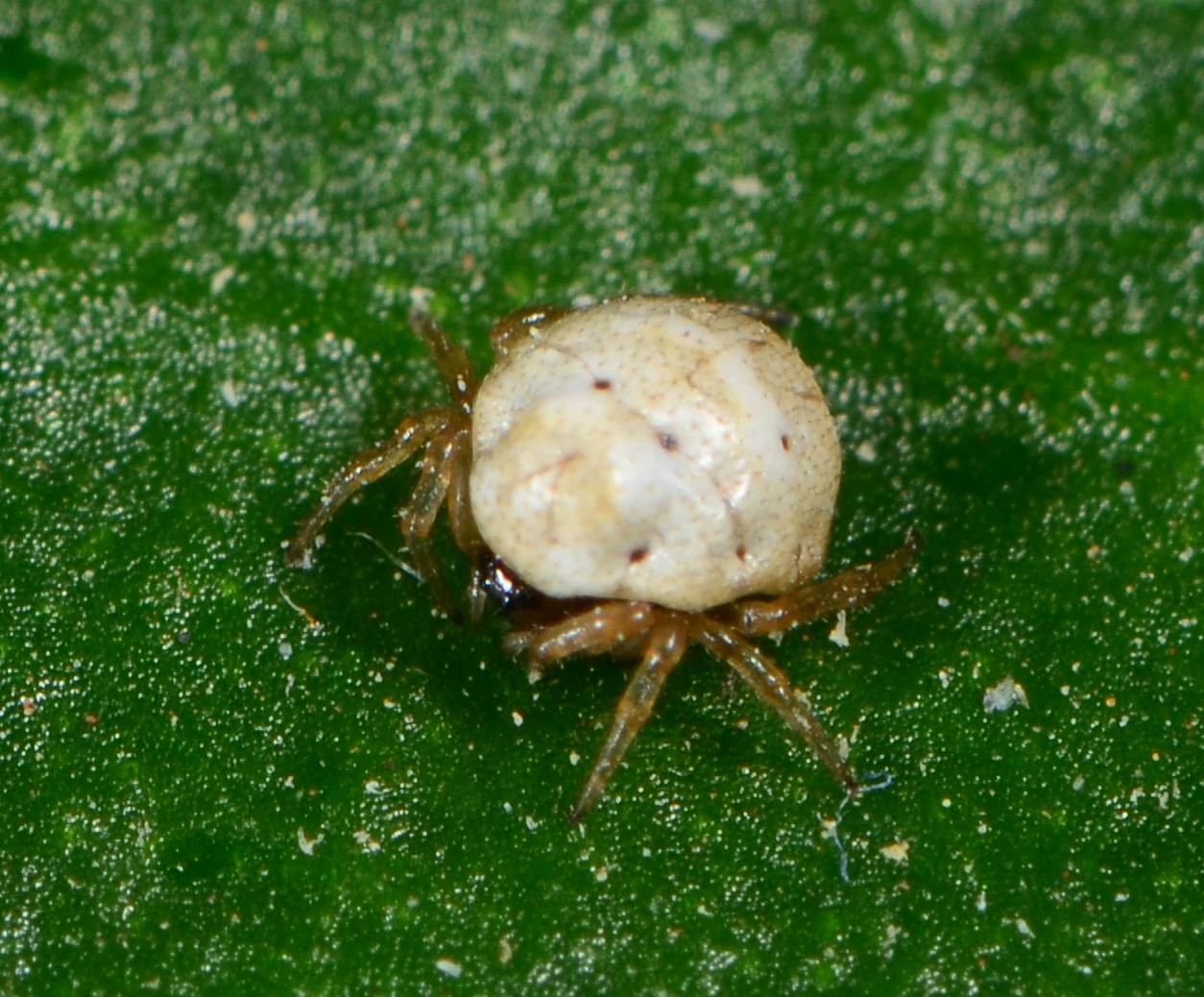
- Female

Scientific classification
- Kingdom: Animalia
- Phylum: Arthropoda
- Subphylum: Chelicerata
- Class: Arachnida
- Order: Araneae
- Infraorder: Araneomorphae
- Family: Theridiidae
- Genus: Phoroncidia
- Species: P. eburnea

Binomial name
- Phoroncidia eburnea (Simon, 1895)

Synonyms
- Ulesanis eburnea Simon, 1895

= Phoroncidia eburnea =

Transvaal Mushroom Comb-Foot Spider

Species of spider

Phoroncidia eburnea is a species of spider in the family Theridiidae. It is endemic to South Africa and Eswatini, and is commonly known as the Transvaal mushroom comb-foot spider.

== Distribution ==
Phoroncidia eburnea is only found in South Africa and Eswatini.

In South Africa, the species has been sampled from the provinces Eastern Cape, Gauteng, KwaZulu-Natal, Limpopo, Mpumalanga, and Northern Cape. Notable locations include Kruger National Park, Blouberg Nature Reserve, and Tswalu Kalahari Reserve.

== Habitat and ecology ==
This rare spider is sampled when sweeping low vegetation.

Phoroncidia eburnea inhabits areas at altitudes from 1 to 1902 m above sea level. The species has been sampled from the Grassland, Indian Ocean Coastal Belt, and Savanna biomes.

== Conservation ==
Phoroncidia eburnea is listed as Least Concern by the South African National Biodiversity Institute. Although known only from females, the species has a wide geographical range and has been sampled from eight protected areas.
