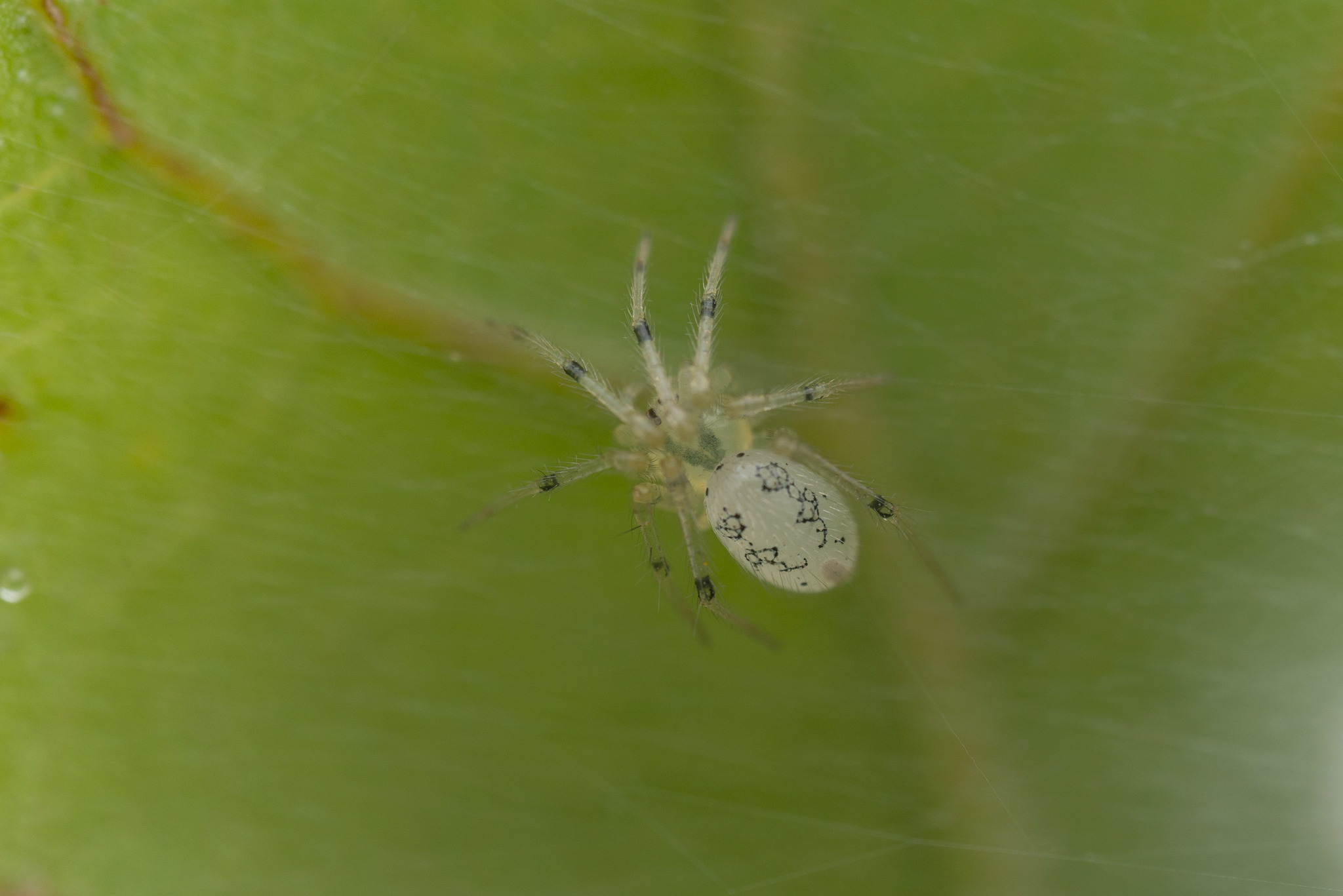
- female from Hong Kong
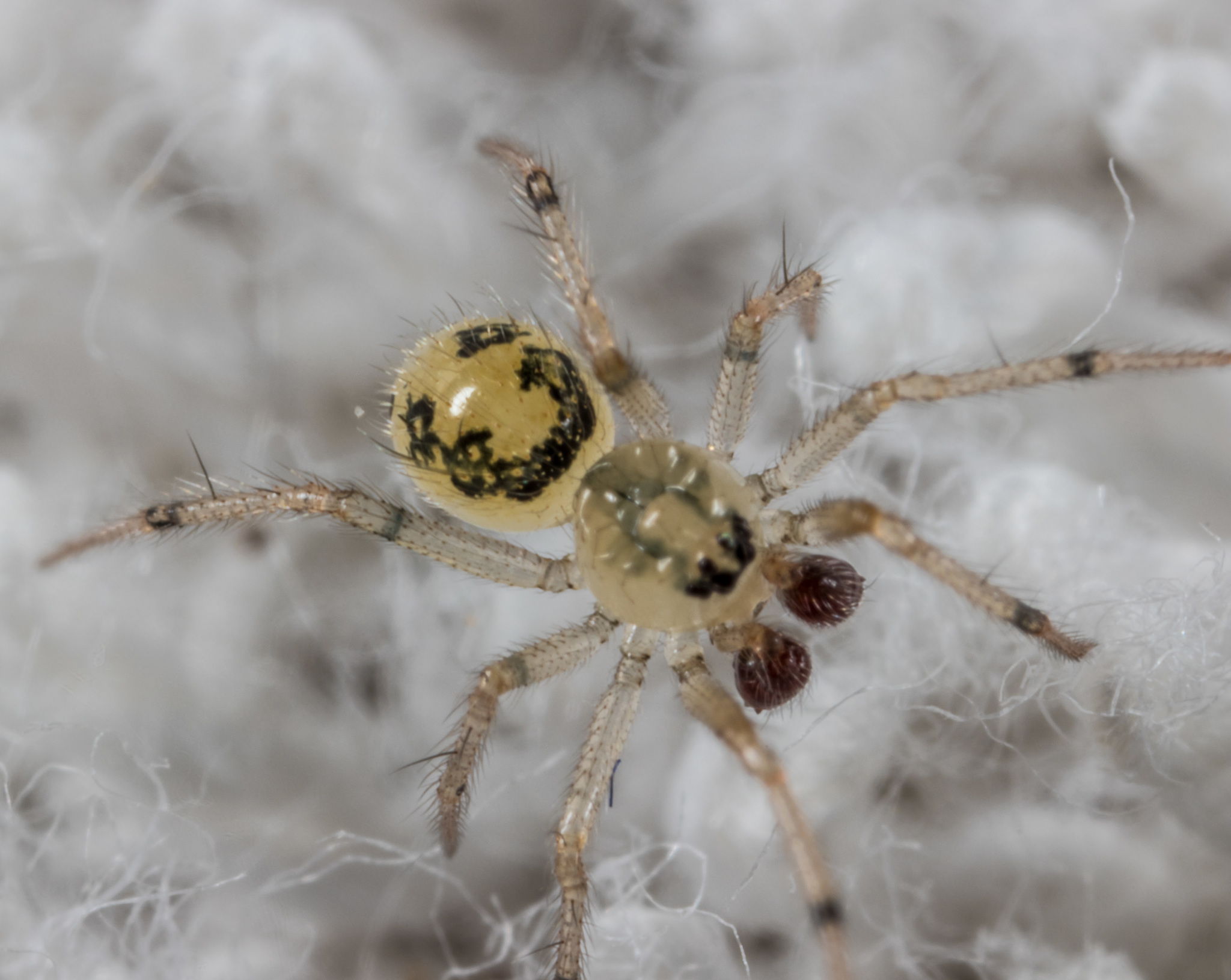
- male from Hong Kong

Scientific classification
- Kingdom: Animalia
- Phylum: Arthropoda
- Subphylum: Chelicerata
- Class: Arachnida
- Order: Araneae
- Infraorder: Araneomorphae
- Family: Theridiidae
- Genus: Phycosoma
- Species: P. turriceps

Binomial name
- Phycosoma turriceps (Schenkel, 1936)

Synonyms
- Paoningia turriceps Schenkel, 1936; Dipoena turriceps (Schenkel, 1936)

= Phycosoma turriceps =

Species of spider

Phycosoma turriceps is a species of spider in the family Theridiidae (cobweb spiders). Originally described in the genus Paoningia and later transferred to Dipoena, it was moved to its current genus Phycosoma in 2025 based on molecular phylogenetic analysis.

== Taxonomy ==
The species was originally described by Schenkel in 1936 as Paoningia turriceps. It was subsequently transferred to the genus Dipoena by Zhu in 1998. Recent molecular phylogenetic studies of hadrotarsine genera from East Asia led to its transfer to Phycosoma in 2025, providing new insights into the relationships within the subfamily Hadrotarsinae of cobweb spiders.

== Distribution ==
P. turriceps is known from China and Laos. In China, it has been recorded from Jiangxi Province.

== Description ==
The species shows sexual dimorphism typical of theridiid spiders. Based on Schenkel's original description from 1936, the male has a total length of 2.6 mm with distinctive morphological features.

=== Male ===
The male cephalothorax measures 1 mm in length and 0.9 mm in width, with a height of 0.54 mm. The abdomen is 1.6 mm long. The posterior eye row measures 0.44 mm, while the anterior eye row is 0.42 mm. The middle eyes are positioned with specific spacing measurements. The clypeus height varies between the lateral and middle eyes.

The male can be distinguished from other Phycosoma species by the position of the bulb end, which is located away from the cymbial tip by the width of the cymbium.

=== Female ===
The female was first described by Zhu in 1998. The female is similar to that of P. amamiense but can be distinguished by the position of the copulatory openings, which are located in the middle position, and the length of the copulatory duct, which equals half the diameter of the first spermatheca.
