= Lasaeola tristis =

Scientific classification
- Kingdom: Animalia
- Phylum: Arthropoda
- Subphylum: Chelicerata
- Class: Arachnida
- Order: Araneae
- Infraorder: Araneomorphae
- Family: Theridiidae
- Genus: Lasaeola
- Species: L. tristis

Binomial name
- Lasaeola tristis (Hahn 1833)

Subspecies
- Lasaeola tristis hissariensis (Charitonov, 1951) — Russia, Central Asia.

Species of spider

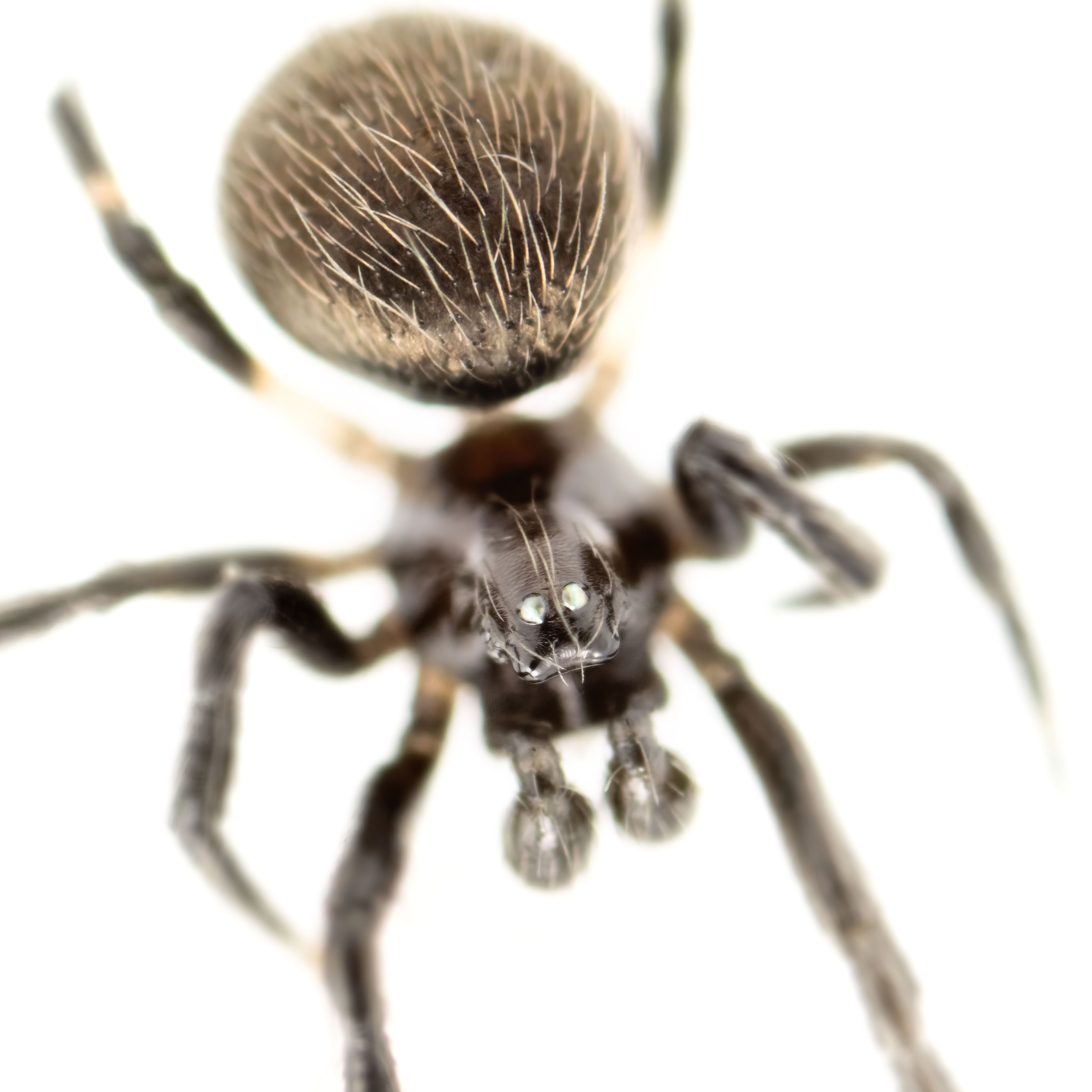
Image of male Lasaeola tristis spider

Lasaeola tristis is a tangle web spider species found from Europe to Central Asia. It is notably found in Lithuania.
