= Dipoena dorsata =

Scientific classification
- Domain: Eukaryota
- Kingdom: Animalia
- Phylum: Arthropoda
- Subphylum: Chelicerata
- Class: Arachnida
- Order: Araneae
- Infraorder: Araneomorphae
- Family: Theridiidae
- Genus: Dipoena
- Species: D. dorsata

Binomial name
- Dipoena dorsata Muma, 1944

Species of spider

Dipoena dorsata is a species of cobweb spider in the family Theridiidae. It is found in a range from the United States to Paraguay.
