= Phoroncidia pukeiwa =

Conservation status
- Data Deficient (NZ TCS)

Scientific classification
- Domain: Eukaryota
- Kingdom: Animalia
- Phylum: Arthropoda
- Subphylum: Chelicerata
- Class: Arachnida
- Order: Araneae
- Infraorder: Araneomorphae
- Family: Theridiidae
- Genus: Phoroncidia
- Species: P. pukeiwa

Binomial name
- Phoroncidia pukeiwa (Marples, 1955)

Synonyms
- Ulesanis pukeiwa

Species of spider

Phoroncidia pukeiwa is a species of cobweb spider that is endemic to New Zealand.

== Taxonomy ==
This species was described in 1955 by Brian John Marples from male and female specimens. It was moved to the Phoroncidia genus in 1983. The holotype is stored in Otago Museum.

== Description ==
The male is recorded at 1.64mm in length whereas the female is 2.12mm.

== Distribution ==
This species is only known from Otago, New Zealand.

== Conservation status ==
Under the New Zealand Threat Classification System, this species is listed as "Data Deficient" with the qualifiers of "Data Poor: Size" and "Data Poor: Trend".
