= Phoroncidia capensis =

Cape Mushroom Comb-Foot Spider

Scientific classification
- Kingdom: Animalia
- Phylum: Arthropoda
- Subphylum: Chelicerata
- Class: Arachnida
- Order: Araneae
- Infraorder: Araneomorphae
- Family: Theridiidae
- Genus: Phoroncidia
- Species: P. capensis

Binomial name
- Phoroncidia capensis (Simon, 1895)

Synonyms
- Ulesanis capensis Simon, 1895

Species of spider

Phoroncidia capensis is a species of spider in the family Theridiidae. It is endemic to South Africa and is commonly known as the Cape mushroom comb-foot spider.

== Distribution ==
Phoroncidia capensis is endemic to South Africa.

In South Africa, the species is known from the Western Cape province. Locations include De Hoop Nature Reserve, Paarl, and Hout Bay.

== Habitat and ecology ==
Nothing is known about the behaviour of this species.

== Conservation ==
Phoroncidia capensis is listed as Data Deficient by the South African National Biodiversity Institute. The species is known only from an unspecified type locality given as "Cap Bonae Spei". The status of the species remains obscure and additional sampling is needed to determine the species' range.
