= Phoroncidia septemaculeata =

Scientific classification
- Kingdom: Animalia
- Phylum: Arthropoda
- Subphylum: Chelicerata
- Class: Arachnida
- Order: Araneae
- Infraorder: Araneomorphae
- Family: Theridiidae
- Genus: Phoroncidia
- Species: P. septemaculeata

Binomial name
- Phoroncidia septemaculeata O. Pickard-Cambridge, 1873

Species of spider

Phoroncidia septemaculeata, is a species of spider of the genus Phoroncidia. It is found in Sri Lanka and India.
