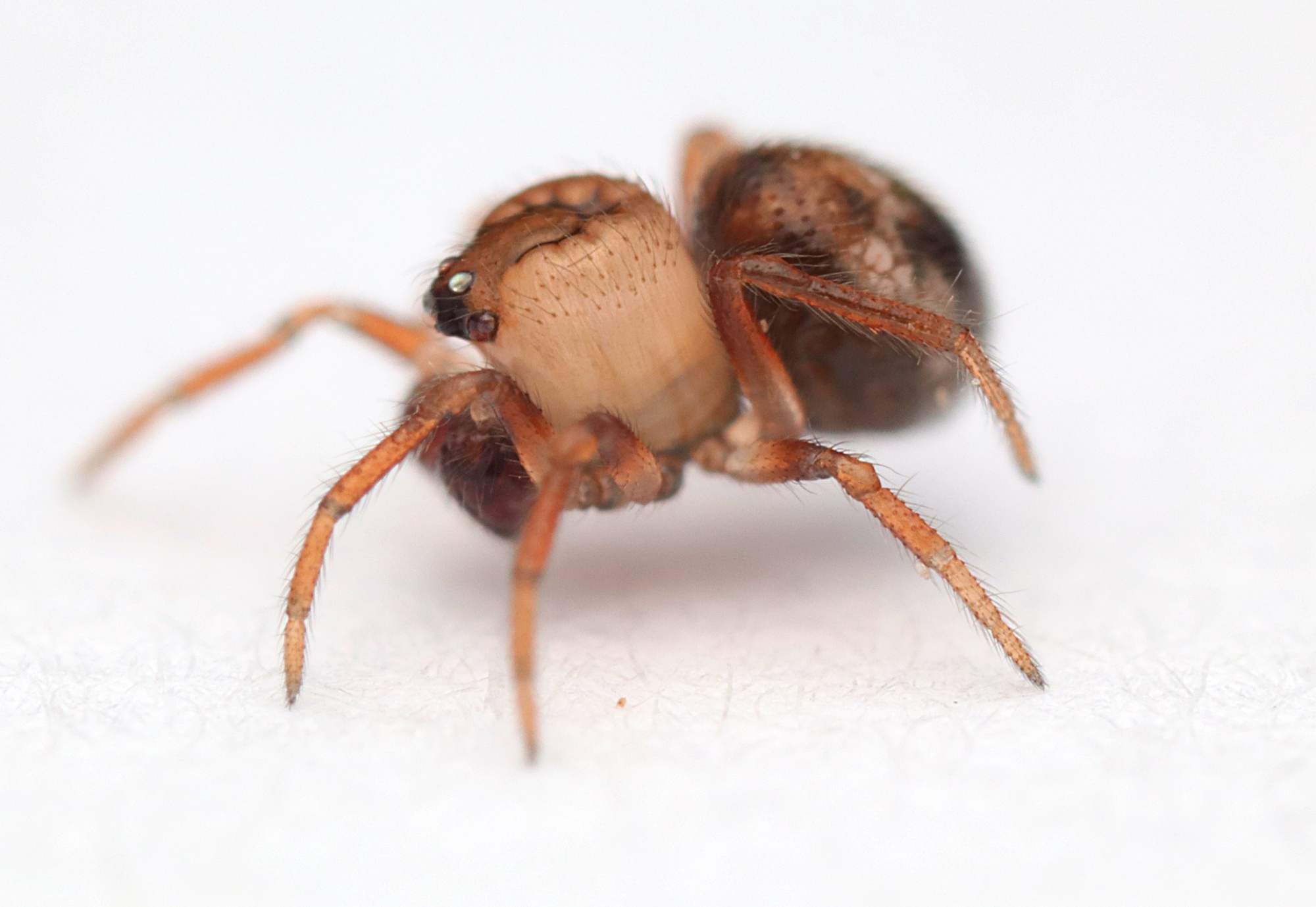

Conservation status
- Not Threatened (NZ TCS)

Scientific classification
- Kingdom: Animalia
- Phylum: Arthropoda
- Subphylum: Chelicerata
- Class: Arachnida
- Order: Araneae
- Infraorder: Araneomorphae
- Family: Theridiidae
- Genus: Phycosoma
- Species: P. oecobioides

Binomial name
- Phycosoma oecobioides O. Pickard-Cambridge, 1880

Synonyms
- Trigonobothrys oecobioides

= Phycosoma oecobioides =

Species of spider

Phycosoma oecobioides is a species of cobweb spider that is endemic to New Zealand.

== Taxonomy ==
This species was described in 1880 by Octavius Pickard-Cambridge from female specimens. It was most recently revised in 2003 and 2004. The holotype is stored in Oxford University Museum of Natural History.

== Description ==
The male is recorded at 2.11mm in length whereas the female is 2.12mm.

== Distribution ==
This species is widespread throughout New Zealand, including on Chatham Island.

== Conservation status ==
Under the New Zealand Threat Classification System, this species is listed as "Not Threatened".
