= Dipoena santacatarinae =

Scientific classification
- Kingdom: Animalia
- Phylum: Arthropoda
- Subphylum: Chelicerata
- Class: Arachnida
- Order: Araneae
- Infraorder: Araneomorphae
- Family: Theridiidae
- Genus: Dipoena
- Species: D. santacatarinae

Binomial name
- Dipoena santacatarinae Levi, 1963

Species of spider

Dipoena santacatarinae is a species of araneomorphae spider in the family Theridiidae.

== Description ==
The male holotype measures 1.3 millimetres (0.051 in) and the female paratype 1.7 millimetres (0.067 in).

== Etymology ==
The name of the species comes from the place of its discovery, Santa Catarina.

== Distribution ==
The species is endemic to Brazil. It is found in the states of Rio Grande do Sul, Santa Catarina, Paraná, São Paulo, Rio de Janeiro and Minas Gerais.
