= Phoroncidia puketoru =

Conservation status
- Data Deficient (NZ TCS)

Scientific classification
- Domain: Eukaryota
- Kingdom: Animalia
- Phylum: Arthropoda
- Subphylum: Chelicerata
- Class: Arachnida
- Order: Araneae
- Infraorder: Araneomorphae
- Family: Theridiidae
- Genus: Phoroncidia
- Species: P. puketoru

Binomial name
- Phoroncidia puketoru (Marples, 1955)

Synonyms
- Ulesanis puketoru

Species of spider

Phoroncidia puketoru is a species of cobweb spider that is endemic to New Zealand.

== Taxonomy ==
This species was described in 1955 by Brian John Marples from male and female specimens. It was moved to the Phoroncidia genus in 1983. The holotype is stored in Otago Museum.

== Description ==
The male is recorded at 1.42mm in length whereas the female is 1.68mm. The body is mostly dark brown. The abdomen has mottled patches of pale cream.

== Distribution ==
This species is known from scattered localities throughout New Zealand.

== Conservation status ==
Under the New Zealand Threat Classification System, this species is listed as "Data Deficient" with the qualifiers of "Data Poor: Size" and "Data Poor: Trend".
