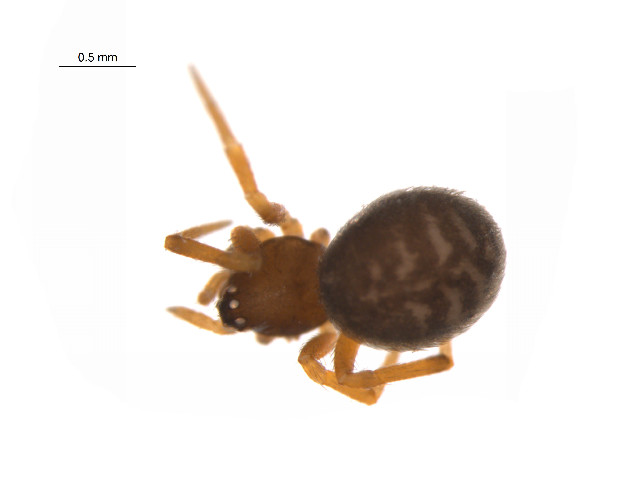
- D. washougalia, female

Scientific classification
- Domain: Eukaryota
- Kingdom: Animalia
- Phylum: Arthropoda
- Subphylum: Chelicerata
- Class: Arachnida
- Order: Araneae
- Infraorder: Araneomorphae
- Family: Theridiidae
- Genus: Dipoena
- Species: D. washougalia

Binomial name
- Dipoena washougalia Levi, 1953

= Dipoena washougalia =

Species of spider

Dipoena washougalia is a species of cobweb spider in the family Theridiidae. It is found in the United States.
