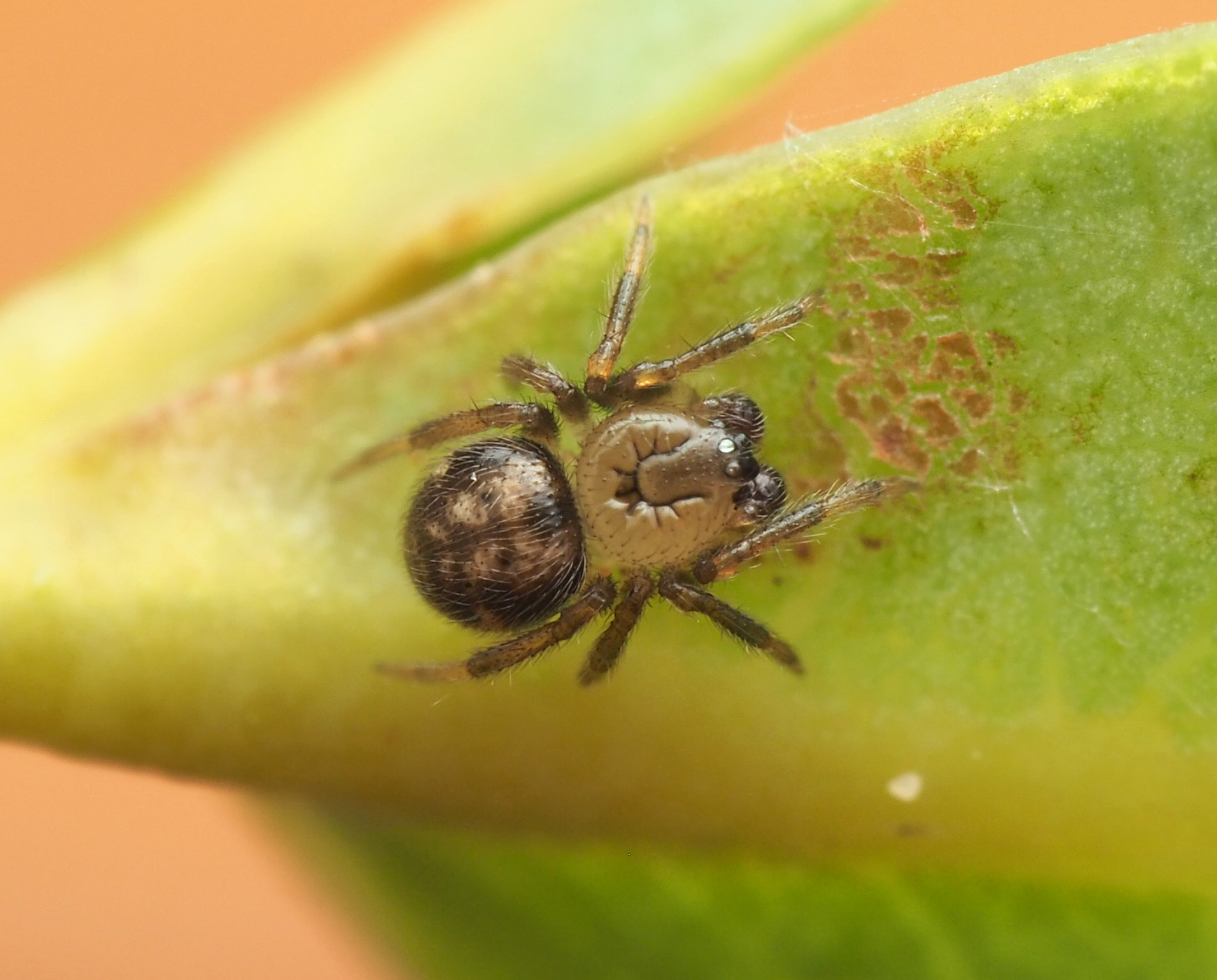
- Phycosoma sp. from Australia
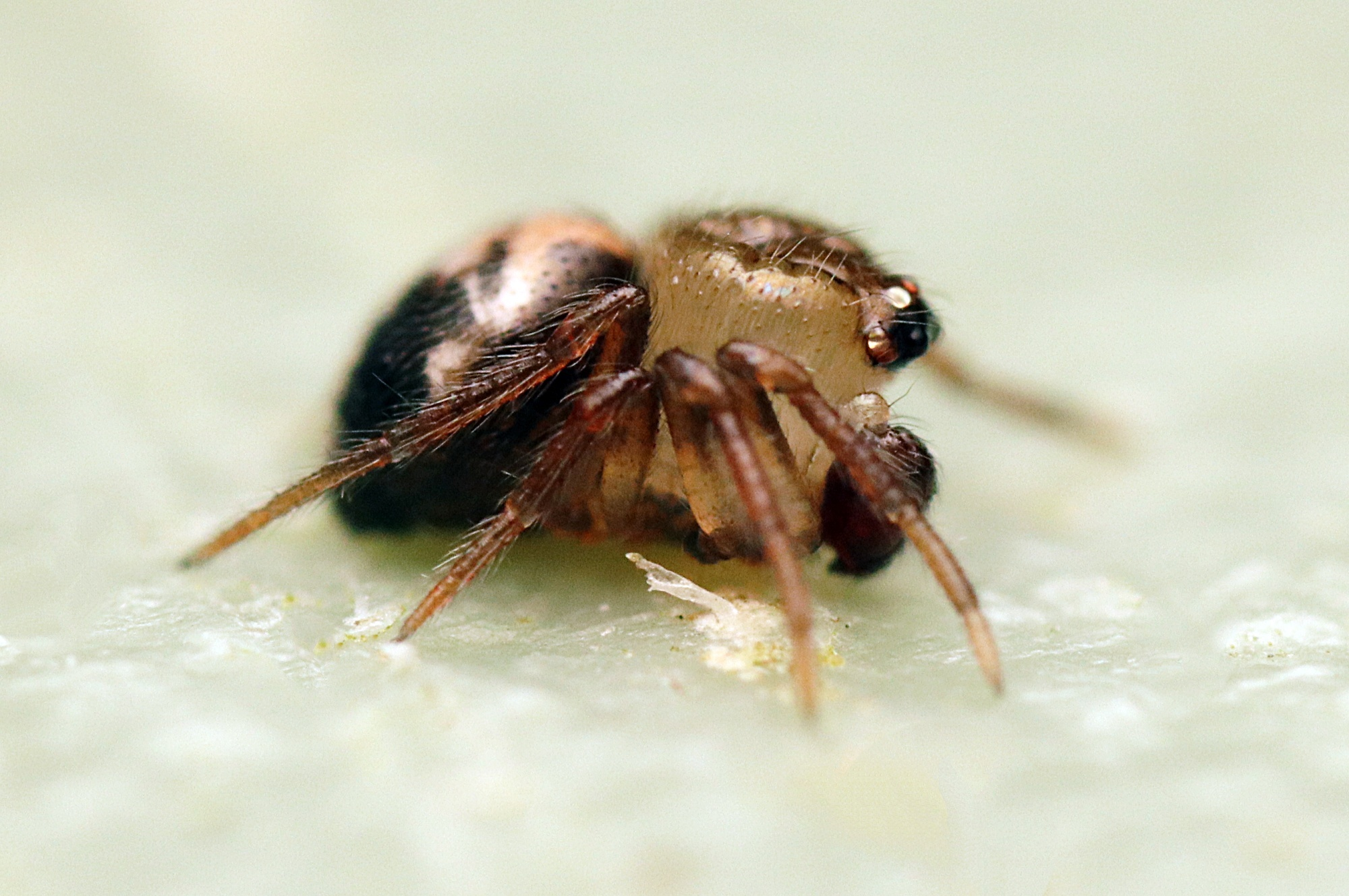
- male P. oecobioides

Scientific classification
- Kingdom: Animalia
- Phylum: Arthropoda
- Subphylum: Chelicerata
- Class: Arachnida
- Order: Araneae
- Infraorder: Araneomorphae
- Family: Theridiidae
- Genus: Phycosoma; O. Pickard-Cambridge, 1879

Type species
- P. oecobioides O. Pickard-Cambridge, 1880

Species
- 32, see text

Synonyms
- Trigonobothrys Simon, 1889

= Phycosoma =

Genus of spiders

Phycosoma is a genus of comb-footed spiders that was first described by Octavius Pickard-Cambridge in 1880.

== Distribution ==
Spiders in this genus are found worldwide.

== Description ==
The genus Phycosoma comprises small spiders typically less than 4 mm in total length. Males are recognized by their very high carapace, sometimes as high as it is long and cylindrical in shape with dorsal grooves and depressions when viewed from above. In females, the carapace is low and not modified. The eye region often projects above the clypeus, with the anterior median eyes sometimes larger than the other eyes. The clypeus is often concave, with very small chelicerae lacking teeth and bearing long, flat fangs.

The abdomen is sometimes modified and sclerotized with a dorsal scutum or hump. Species bear numerous short setae originating from small tubercles, and most species lack a colulus. Leg IV is slightly longer than the others, with legs being medium to short overall.

== Life style ==
These spiders construct small webs near the ground where they feed on ants. They are also called gallows-spiders because they hang their prey until it dies.

== Taxonomy ==
Several Phycosoma species have been sampled from pitfall traps throughout South Africa but remain unnamed.

== Species ==
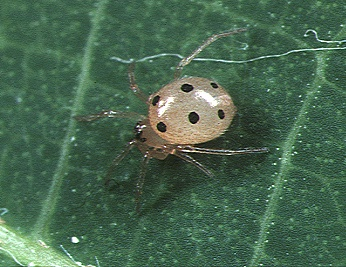
female P. martinae from Okinawa

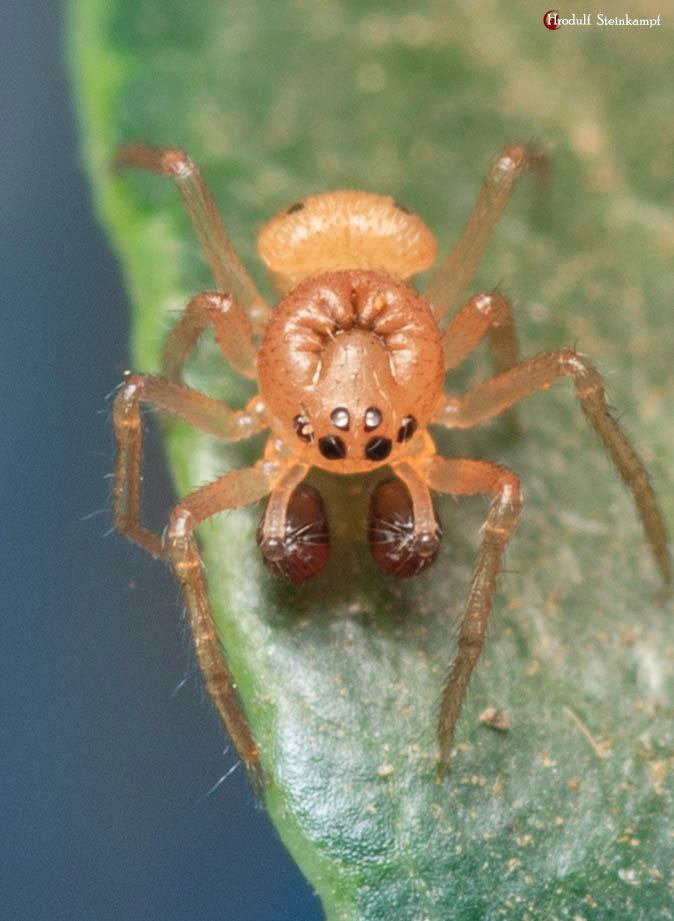
male P. martinae from South Africa

As of October 2025, this genus includes 32 species:

- Phycosoma aheneum (Dyal, 1935) – Pakistan
- Phycosoma altum (Keyserling, 1886) – Mexico to Brazil. Introduced to Hawaii
- Phycosoma amamiense (Yoshida, 1985) – Russia (Far East), China, Korea, Japan
- Phycosoma corrugum Gao & Li, 2014 – China
- Phycosoma crenatum Gao & Li, 2014 – China
- Phycosoma diaoluo F. Zhang & B. S. Zhang, 2012 – China (Hainan)
- Phycosoma digitula F. Zhang & B. S. Zhang, 2012 – China (Hainan)
- Phycosoma excisum (Simon, 1889) – Madagascar
- Phycosoma flavomarginatum (Bösenberg & Strand, 1906) – China, Korea, Japan
- Phycosoma hainanense (Zhu, 1998) – China (Hainan), Laos
- Phycosoma hana (Zhu, 1998) – China
- Phycosoma inornatum (O. Pickard-Cambridge, 1861) – Europe, Turkey, Armenia, Azerbaijan, Iran
- Phycosoma jamesi (Roberts, 1979) – Jamaica, Panama
- Phycosoma japonicum (Yoshida, 1985) – China, Korea, Japan
- Phycosoma labiale (Zhu, 1998) – Russia (Far East), China
- Phycosoma ligulaceum Gao & Li, 2014 – China
- Phycosoma lineatipes (Bryant, 1933) – USA to Brazil, Galapagos
- Phycosoma martinae (Roberts, 1983) – Kenya, Angola, South Africa, Seychelles, Madagascar, India, China, Korea, Japan (Ryukyu Is.), Philippines
- Phycosoma menustya (Roberts, 1983) – Seychelles
- Phycosoma molle (Simon, 1903) – Equatorial Guinea
- Phycosoma mustelinum (Simon, 1889) – Russia (Far East), China, Korea, Japan, Indonesia (Krakatau)
- Phycosoma nigromaculatum (Yoshida, 1987) – China, Taiwan, Korea, Japan
- Phycosoma oecobioides O. Pickard-Cambridge, 1880 – New Zealand (mainland, Chatham Is.) (type species)
- Phycosoma ripa (Zhu, 1998) – China
- Phycosoma sinicum (Zhu, 1992) – China, Vietnam
- Phycosoma spundana (Roberts, 1978) – South Africa, Seychelles
- Phycosoma stellare (Zhu, 1998) – China
- Phycosoma stictum (Zhu, 1992) – China, Korea
- Phycosoma stigmosum Yin, 2012 – China
- Phycosoma submustelinum (Zhu, 1998) – China
- Phycosoma turriceps (Schenkel, 1936) – China, Laos
- Phycosoma yanshun Lin & Li, 2024 – Vietnam
