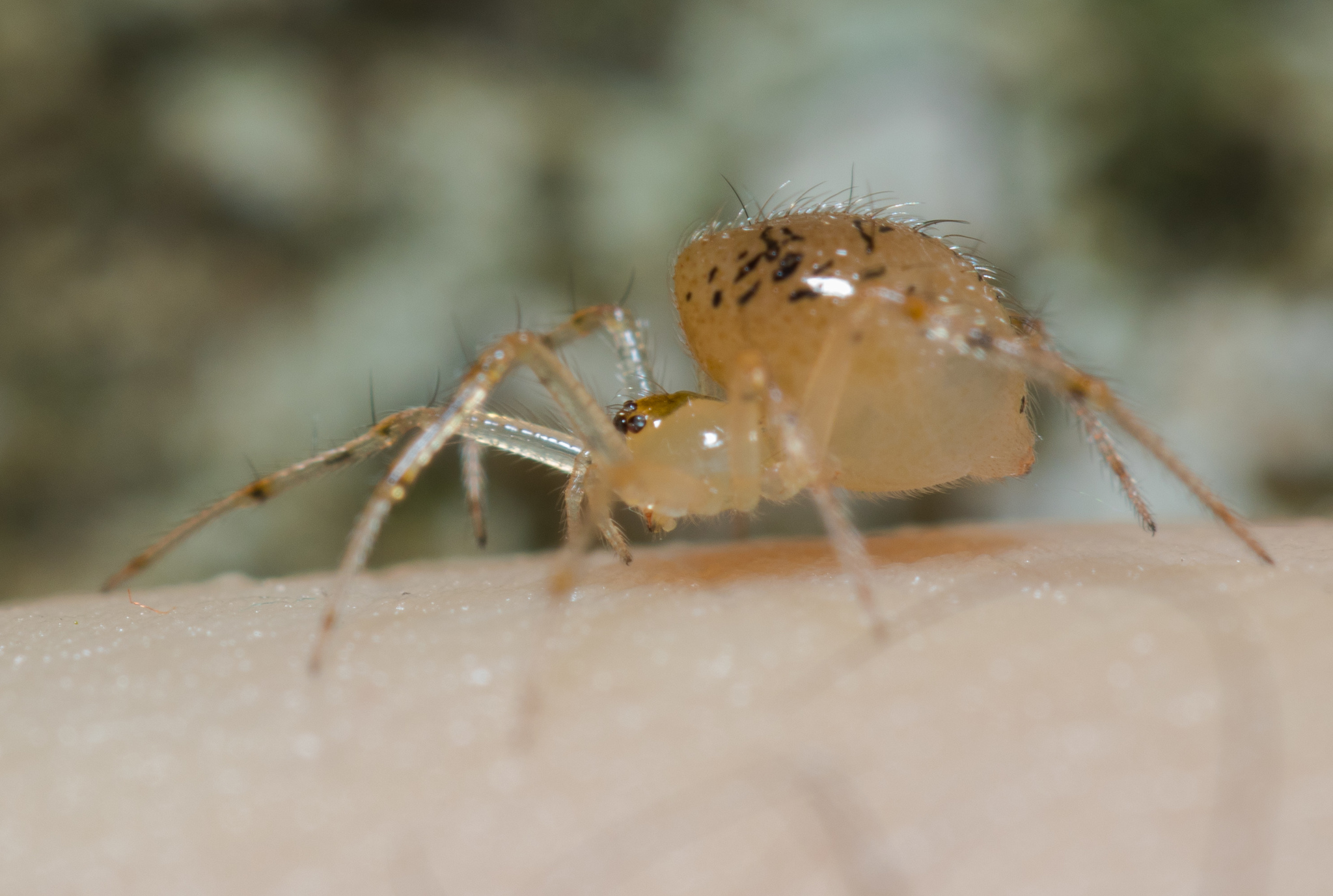
- from Hong Kong

Scientific classification
- Kingdom: Animalia
- Phylum: Arthropoda
- Subphylum: Chelicerata
- Class: Arachnida
- Order: Araneae
- Infraorder: Araneomorphae
- Family: Theridiidae
- Genus: Phycosoma
- Species: P. digitula

Binomial name
- Phycosoma digitula F. Zhang & B. S. Zhang, 2012

= Phycosoma digitula =

Species of spider

Phycosoma digitula is a species of spider in the family Theridiidae. It is endemic to China.

== Taxonomy ==
Phycosoma digitula was first described by F. Zhang and B. S. Zhang in 2012 based on specimens collected from Hainan Island, China. The species belongs to the genus Phycosoma, which is characterized by males having very high, almost cylindrical carapaces with deep dorsal grooves, and eye regions that often project beyond the clypeus.

== Distribution ==
P. digitula is described from Hainan Island in southern China. The type specimens were collected from Bawangling Town and Jianfengling Mountain in May 2009. It has been observed from Taiwan to Singapore.

== Description ==
Males of P. digitula have a total body length of 3.05–3.15 mm, with the carapace measuring 1.49 mm long and 1.22 mm wide. The carapace is yellowish with a yellow-brown median part and a distinctive black cervical groove. Each eye is surrounded by a black ring.

The species can be distinguished from other Phycosoma species by the male's wide apical cymbium (the boat-shaped structure at the tip of the pedipalp). Females are distinguished by their wide, U-shaped scapus and long copulatory ducts, separating them from closely related species like P. flavomarginatum, P. hainanensis, and P. hana.

The legs are thin with scattered long black spines, and the leg formula is 4-1-2-3 (meaning the fourth leg is longest, followed by the first, second, and third legs). The opisthosoma is oval-shaped and covered with sparse, long black setae.

== Etymology ==
The species name "digitula" refers to the digitiform (finger-like) apophysis found on the tegulum of the male palp.
