= Phoroncidia testudo =

Scientific classification
- Kingdom: Animalia
- Phylum: Arthropoda
- Subphylum: Chelicerata
- Class: Arachnida
- Order: Araneae
- Infraorder: Araneomorphae
- Family: Theridiidae
- Genus: Phoroncidia
- Species: P. testudo

Binomial name
- Phoroncidia testudo (O. Pickard-Cambridge, 1873)

Species of spider

Phoroncidia testudo, is a species of spider of the genus Phoroncidia. It is native to India and Sri Lanka.
