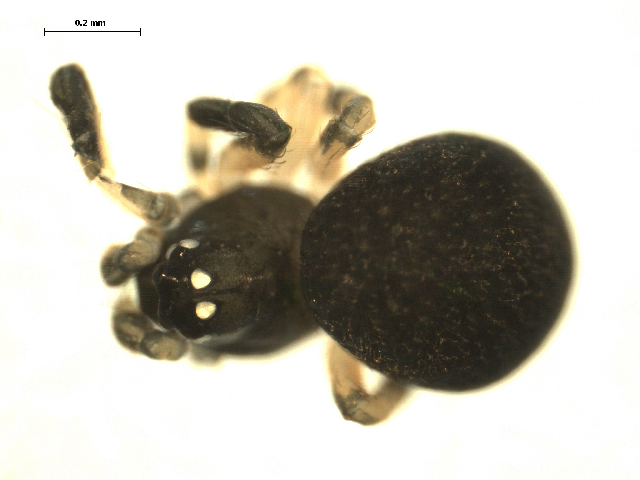
- D. nigra, female

Conservation status
- Secure (NatureServe)

Scientific classification
- Kingdom: Animalia
- Phylum: Arthropoda
- Subphylum: Chelicerata
- Class: Arachnida
- Order: Araneae
- Infraorder: Araneomorphae
- Family: Theridiidae
- Genus: Dipoena
- Species: D. nigra

Binomial name
- Dipoena nigra (Emerton, 1882)

= Dipoena nigra =

Species of spider

Dipoena nigra is a species of cobweb spider in the family Theridiidae. It is found in the USA, Canada, and Mexico.
