= Phoroncidia nasuta =

Scientific classification
- Kingdom: Animalia
- Phylum: Arthropoda
- Subphylum: Chelicerata
- Class: Arachnida
- Order: Araneae
- Infraorder: Araneomorphae
- Family: Theridiidae
- Genus: Phoroncidia
- Species: P. nasuta

Binomial name
- Phoroncidia nasuta (O. Pickard-Cambridge, 1873)

Synonyms
- Stegosoma nasuta O. Pickard-Cambridge, 1873; Ulesanis nasuta Simon, 1894; Ulesanis nasutus Yoshida, 2011

Species of spider

Phoroncidia nasuta, is a species of spider of the genus Phoroncidia.

== Distribution ==
It is found in Japan, Sri Lanka and Taiwan.

The spider is known as Hana Naga poke Ne spider (トウキョウカブトヒメグモ) in Japan.
