= Phycosoma spundana =

Scientific classification
- Kingdom: Animalia
- Phylum: Arthropoda
- Subphylum: Chelicerata
- Class: Arachnida
- Order: Araneae
- Infraorder: Araneomorphae
- Family: Theridiidae
- Genus: Phycosoma
- Species: P. spundana

Binomial name
- Phycosoma spundana (Roberts, 1978)

Synonyms
- Dipoena spundana Roberts, 1978

Species of spider

Phycosoma spundana is a species of spider in the family Theridiidae. It is an Afrotropical endemic commonly known as the small-spots comb-foot spider.

== Distribution ==
Phycosoma spundana is known from the Seychelles and South Africa.

In South Africa, the species has been recorded from KwaZulu-Natal and Limpopo provinces. Specific locations include Ndumo Game Reserve and Entabeni Forest.

== Habitat and ecology ==
Phycosoma spundana has been sampled from the Savanna biome at approximately 140 m altitude.

== Conservation ==
Phycosoma spundana is listed as Least Concern despite limited sampling. The species is expected to occur in more African countries beyond its currently known range. It is protected in Ndumo Game Reserve.

== Taxonomy ==
Phycosoma spundana was described by Roberts in 1978 as Dipoena spundana from the Seychelles. The species was transferred to Phycosoma by Saaristo in 2006, who also described the female for the first time.
