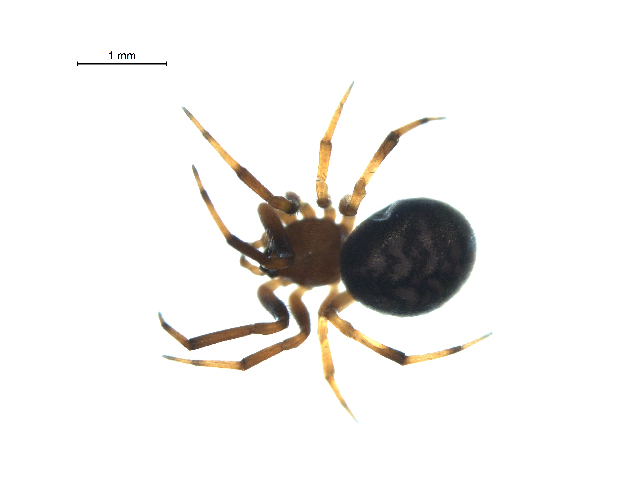
- Dipoena malkini, female
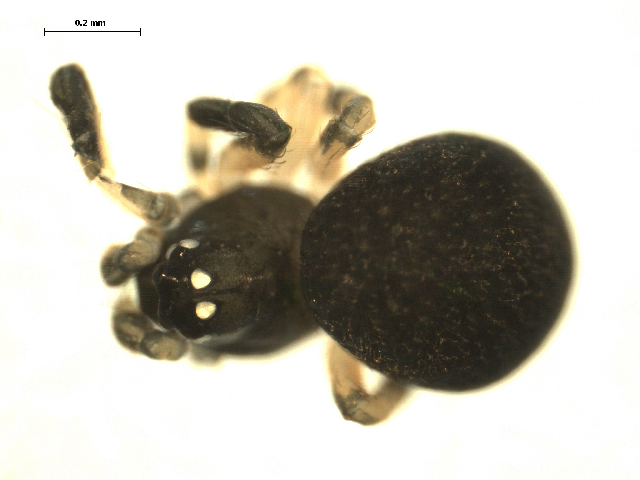
- Dipoena nigra, female

Scientific classification
- Kingdom: Animalia
- Phylum: Arthropoda
- Subphylum: Chelicerata
- Class: Arachnida
- Order: Araneae
- Infraorder: Araneomorphae
- Family: Theridiidae
- Genus: Dipoena; Thorell, 1869

Type species
- D. melanogaster (C. L. Koch, 1837)

Species
- 162, see text

Synonyms
- Paoningia Schenkel, 1936; Stictoxena Simon, 1894; Umfila Keyserling, 1886

= Dipoena =

Genus of spiders

Dipoena is a genus of tangle-web spiders that was first described by Tamerlan Thorell in 1869.

== Species ==
As of September 2019 it contains 162 species, found in Asia, Central America, North America, Africa, the Caribbean, Europe, South America, on Vanuatu, and in Australia:

- D. abdita Gertsch & Mulaik, 1936 – USA, Mexico, Caribbean
- D. aculeata (Hickman, 1951) – Australia (Tasmania)
- D. adunca Tso, Zhu & Zhang, 2005 – Taiwan
- D. ahenea (Dyal, 1935) – Pakistan
- D. anahuas Levi, 1963 – Mexico
- D. anas Levi, 1963 – Panama, Colombia
- D. appalachia Levi, 1953 – USA, Canada
- D. arborea Zhang & Zhang, 2011 – China
- D. atlantica Chickering, 1943 – Panama to Paraguay
- D. augara Levi, 1963 – Venezuela, Brazil
- D. austera Simon, 1908 – Australia (Western Australia)
- D. banksi Chickering, 1943 – Costa Rica to Venezuela
- D. bellingeri Levi, 1963 – Jamaica
- D. beni Levi, 1963 – Bolivia
- D. bernardino Levi, 1963 – USA
- D. bifida Zhang & Zhang, 2011 – China
- D. bimini Levi, 1963 – Bahama Is., Cuba
- D. bodjensis (Simon, 1885) – Indonesia (Bodjo Is.)
- D. bonitensis Rodrigues, 2013 – Brazil
- D. boquete Levi, 1963 – Panama
- D. braccata (C. L. Koch, 1841) – Europe, Mediterranean, Caucasus
- D. bristowei Caporiacco, 1949 – Kenya
- D. bryantae Chickering, 1943 – Panama, Trinidad, Brazil
- D. buccalis Keyserling, 1886 – North America
- D. calvata Gao & Li, 2014 – China
- D. cartagena Sedgwick, 1973 – Chile
- D. cathedralis Levi, 1953 – China, USA
- D. chathami Levi, 1953 – USA
- D. chickeringi Levi, 1953 – Panama
- D. chillana Levi, 1963 – Chile
- D. cidae Rodrigues, 2013 – Brazil
- D. complexa Gao & Li, 2014 – China
- D. cordiformis Keyserling, 1886 – Costa Rica to Brazil
- D. cornuta Chickering, 1943 – Nicaragua to Bolivia
- D. croatica (Chyzer, 1894) – Eastern Europe
- D. crocea (O. Pickard-Cambridge, 1896) – Guatemala
- D. destricta Simon, 1903 – Sierra Leone
- D. dominicana Wunderlich, 1986 – Hispaniola
- D. dorsata Muma, 1944 – USA to Paraguay
- D. duodecimpunctata Chickering, 1943 – Panama, Venezuela, Brazil
- D. eatoni Chickering, 1943 – Mexico, Panama
- D. ericae Rodrigues, 2013 – Brazil
- D. erythropus (Simon, 1881) – Europe
- D. esra Levi, 1963 – Peru, Brazil
- D. flavomaculata (Keyserling, 1891) – Brazil
- D. foliata Keyserling, 1886 – Brazil
- D. fornicata Thorell, 1895 – Myanmar
- D. fortunata Levi, 1953 – Mexico
- D. fozdoiguacuensis Rodrigues, 2013 – Brazil
- D. galilaea Levy & Amitai, 1981 – Greece, Israel
- D. glomerabilis Simon, 1909 – Vietnam
- D. grammata Simon, 1903 – Gabon
- D. granulata (Keyserling, 1886) – Brazil, Argentina
- D. guaraquecaba Rodrigues, 2013 – Brazil
- D. gui Zhu, 1998 – China
- D. hasra Roberts, 1983 – Seychelles (Aldabra)
- D. hortoni Chickering, 1943 – Panama to Brazil
- D. hui Zhu, 1998 – China
- D. insulana Chickering, 1943 – Mexico to Panama
- D. ira Levi, 1963 – Brazil
- D. isthmia Chickering, 1943 – Panama, Brazil
- D. josephus Levi, 1953 – Costa Rica, Panama
- D. keumunensis Paik, 1996 – Korea
- D. keyserlingi Levi, 1963 – Brazil
- D. kuyuwini Levi, 1963 – Venezuela, Guyana, Brazil, Bolivia
- D. lana Levi, 1953 – USA, Panama
- D. latifrons Denis, 1951 – France, Spain (Balearic Is.)?
- D. lesnei Simon, 1899 – Algeria
- D. leveillei (Simon, 1885) – Algeria, Tunisia
- D. liguanea Levi, 1963 – Jamaica
- D. lindholmi (Strand, 1910) – Ukraine
- D. linzhiensis Hu, 2001 – China
- D. longiducta Zhang & Zhang, 2011 – China
- D. longiventris (Simon, 1905) – Argentina
- D. lugens (O. Pickard-Cambridge, 1909) – Britain, Spain
- D. luisi Levi, 1953 – Mexico
- D. malkini Levi, 1953 – USA
- D. meckeli Simon, 1898 – St. Vincent
- D. melanogaster (C. L. Koch, 1837) (type) – Europe, North Africa to Azerbaijan, Iran
- D. membranula Zhang & Zhang, 2011 – China
- D. mendoza Levi, 1967 – Brazil, Argentina
- D. mertoni Levi, 1963 – Panama
- D. militaris Chickering, 1943 – Panama to Paraguay
- D. mitifica Simon, 1899 – Indonesia (Sumatra)
- D. mollis (Simon, 1903) – Equatorial Guinea
- D. neotoma Levi, 1953 – USA
- D. nigra (Emerton, 1882) – USA, Canada, Mexico
- D. nigroreticulata (Simon, 1880) – Europe to Azerbaijan
- D. nipponica Yoshida, 2002 – China, Japan
- D. niteroi Levi, 1963 – Brazil
- D. notata Dyal, 1935 – Pakistan
- D. obscura Keyserling, 1891 – Brazil
- D. ocosingo Levi, 1953 – Mexico
- D. ohigginsi Levi, 1963 – Chile
- D. olivenca Levi, 1963 – Brazil
- D. opana Levi, 1963 – Brazil
- D. origanata Levi, 1953 – Mexico
- D. orvillei Chickering, 1943 – Panama
- D. pacifica Chickering, 1943 – Panama, Jamaica
- D. pacificana Berland, 1938 – Vanuatu
- D. pallisteri Levi, 1963 – Peru
- D. parki Chickering, 1943 – Panama
- D. pelorosa Zhu, 1998 – China, Japan
- D. peregregia Simon, 1909 – Vietnam
- D. perimenta Levi, 1963 – Panama
- D. peruensis Levi, 1963 – Peru, Brazil, Paraguay
- D. petrunkevitchi Roewer, 1942 – Myanmar
- D. picta (Thorell, 1890) – Indonesia (Sumatra)
- D. plaumanni Levi, 1963 – Brazil
- D. polita (Mello-Leitão, 1947) – Brazil
- D. praecelsa Simon, 1914 – France
- D. pristea Roberts, 1983 – Seychelles (Aldabra)
- D. proterva Chickering, 1943 – Panama
- D. provalis Levi, 1953 – USA
- D. puertoricensis Levi, 1963 – Puerto Rico, Brazil
- D. pulicaria (Thorell, 1890) – Indonesia (Sumatra)
- D. pumicata (Keyserling, 1886) – Brazil, Argentina
- D. punctisparsa Yaginuma, 1967 – Korea, Japan
- D. pusilla (Keyserling, 1886) – Brazil
- D. quadricuspis Caporiacco, 1949 – Kenya
- D. redunca Zhu, 1998 – China
- D. ripa Zhu, 1998 – China
- D. rita Levi, 1953 – USA
- D. rubella (Keyserling, 1884) – Panama to Peru, Brazil
- D. santacatarinae Levi, 1963 – Brazil
- D. santaritadopassaquatrensis Rodrigues, 2013 – Brazil
- D. scabella Simon, 1903 – Equatorial Guinea
- D. seclusa Chickering, 1948 – Panama to Venezuela
- D. sedilloti (Simon, 1885) – France, Algeria, Tunisia
- D. semicana Simon, 1909 – Vietnam
- D. seminigra Simon, 1909 – Vietnam
- D. sericata (Simon, 1880) – France
- D. sertata (Simon, 1895) – Sri Lanka
- D. setosa (Hickman, 1951) – Australia (Tasmania)
- D. shortiducta Zhang & Zhang, 2011 – China
- D. signifera Simon, 1909 – Vietnam
- D. silvicola Miller, 1970 – Angola
- D. standleyi Levi, 1963 – Panama
- D. subflavida Thorell, 1895 – Myanmar
- D. submustelina Zhu, 1998 – China
- D. sulfurica Levi, 1953 – USA, Mexico
- D. taeniatipes Keyserling, 1891 – Brazil
- D. tecoja Levi, 1953 – Mexico
- D. tingo Levi, 1963 – Peru, Brazil
- D. tiro Levi, 1963 – Venezuela, Brazil
- D. torva (Thorell, 1875) – Europe, Russia (Europe to South Siberia), Kazakhstan
- D. transversisulcata Strand, 1908 – Madagascar
- D. trinidensis Levi, 1963 – Trinidad, Brazil
- D. tropica Chickering, 1943 – Panama, Colombia
- D. tuldokguhitanea Barrion & Litsinger, 1995 – Philippines
- D. turriceps (Schenkel, 1936) – China, Laos
- D. umbratilis (Simon, 1873) – Western Mediterranean
- D. variabilis (Keyserling, 1886) – Brazil
- D. venusta Chickering, 1948 – Panama
- D. wangi Zhu, 1998 – China, Korea
- D. washougalia Levi, 1953 – USA
- D. waspucensis Levi, 1963 – Nicaragua
- D. woytkowskii Levi, 1963 – Venezuela, Peru
- D. xanthopus Simon, 1914 – Algeria
- D. yutian Hu & Wu, 1989 – China
- D. zeteki Chickering, 1943 – Panama
- D. zhangi Yin, 2012 – China

In synonymy:

- D. barro Levi, 1963 = Dipoena anas Levi, 1963
- D. copiosa Levi, 1953 = Dipoena cordiformis Keyserling, 1886
- D. crassiventris Keyserling, 1886 = Dipoena nigra (Emerton, 1882)
- D. inca Levi, 1963 = Dipoena tingo Levi, 1963
- D. inornata (Chamberlin & Ivie, 1944, T from Euryopis) = Dipoena abdita Gertsch & Mulaik, 1936
- D. itu Levi, 1963 = Dipoena taeniatipes Keyserling, 1891
- D. maculata Keyserling, 1891 = Dipoena pumicata (Keyserling, 1886)
- D. matagrossensis Soares & Camargo, 1948 = Dipoena militaris Chickering, 1943
- D. parvula Banks, 1901 = Dipoena nigra (Emerton, 1882)
- D. procax (Simon, 1879) = Dipoena torva (Thorell, 1875)
- D. roeweri Chickering, 1951 = Dipoena rubella (Keyserling, 1884)
- D. schmidti Levi, 1963 = Dipoena banksi Chickering, 1943
- D. sicki Levi, 1963 (T from Dipoenata) = Dipoena variabilis (Keyserling, 1886)
- D. tibialis Banks, 1906 = Dipoena nigra (Emerton, 1882)
