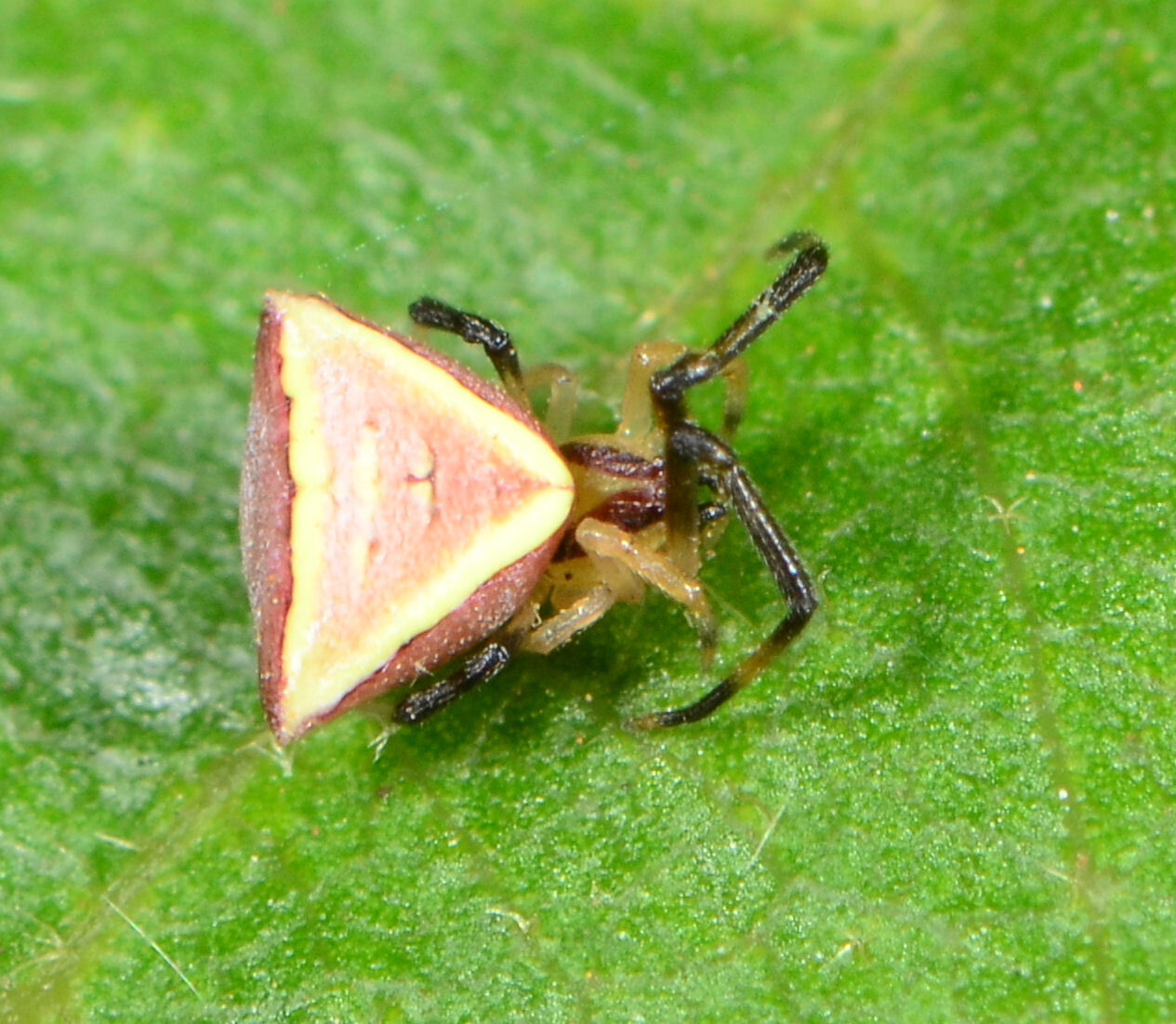
- Female E. bilineatus
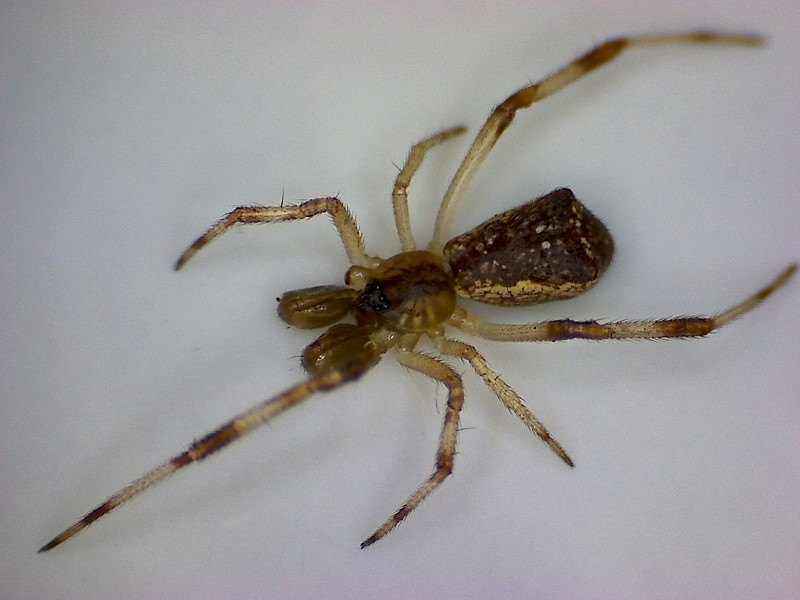
- Male Episinus angulatus

Scientific classification
- Kingdom: Animalia
- Phylum: Arthropoda
- Subphylum: Chelicerata
- Class: Arachnida
- Order: Araneae
- Infraorder: Araneomorphae
- Family: Theridiidae
- Genus: Episinus; Walckenaer, 1809

Type species
- E. truncatus Latreille, 1809

Species
- 44, see text

Synonyms
- Episinopsis Simon, 1894; Hyocrea Simon, 1894; Hyptimorpha Strand, 1906; Penictis Simon, 1894; Plocamis Simon, 1894

= Episinus =

Episinus Temporal range: Palaeogene– Present

Genus of spiders

Episinus is a genus of comb-footed spiders that was first described by Pierre André Latreille in 1809.

They can grow up to 5 millimetres (0.20 in) long.

== Distribution ==
Spiders of this genus are found worldwide.

== Life style ==
Episinus can be found at ground level between low vegetation, making a very simple H or Y-shaped web near ground level. Courtship takes place in summer. The egg-sac is white and spherical and has a coarse loop of silk around it.

== Description ==
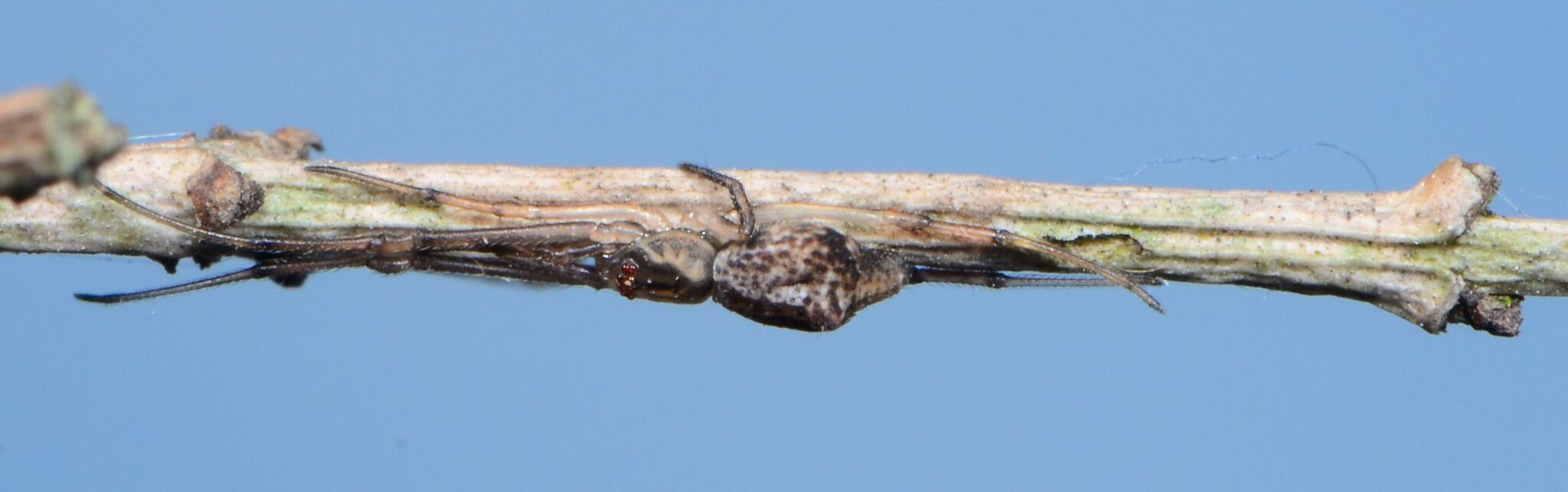
female E. bishopi

The body length is 6 mm. The carapace is slightly longer than it is wide, and the eye region is either roundly elevated or projects anteriorly. There is often a pair of horns between the anterior and posterior median eyes that feature silvery and sometimes reddish pigment.

The clypeus is low and flat, and it usually projects anteriorly. The fovea is distinct and long. Eight eyes are arranged more or less circularly, often on tubercles, with the anterior median eyes being the smallest. The eyes are usually bordered by black.

The abdomen is usually widest behind the middle and is modified with humps and tubercles. It is often light-colored with marks and streaks, and sometimes features white pigment.

The leg formula is either 1423 or 4123, and all legs are somewhat robust. The legs are usually pale yellow to brown in color, with dusky flecks and marks or bands.

== Species ==
As of October 2025, this genus includes 44 species and one subspecies:

- Episinus affinis Bösenberg & Strand, 1906 – India, Russia (Far East), Korea, Taiwan, Japan
- Episinus algiricus Lucas, 1846 – Portugal, Spain, France, Italy, Malta, Morocco, Algeria, Tunisia
- Episinus amoenus Banks, 1911 – United States, Mexico
- Episinus angulatus (Blackwall, 1836) – Europe, Turkey, Russia (Europe to West Siberia), Kazakhstan, Central Asia
- Episinus antipodianus O. Pickard-Cambridge, 1880 – New Zealand
- Episinus bilineatus Simon, 1894 – Botswana, South Africa, Lesotho
- Episinus bimucronatus (Simon, 1895) – Venezuela
- Episinus bishopi (Lessert, 1929) – DR Congo, South Africa
- Episinus bonjovi Lin & Li, 2021 – China
- Episinus cavernicola (Kulczyński, 1897) – Croatia, Slovenia
- Episinus chikunii Yoshida, 1985 – Japan
- Episinus emanus Levi, 1964 – Panama
- Episinus fontinalis Levy, 1985 – Israel
- Episinus garisus Buckup & Marques, 1992 – Brazil
- Episinus gibbus Zhu & Wang, 1995 – China
- Episinus hickmani Caporiacco, 1949 – Kenya
- Episinus immundus (Keyserling, 1884) – Peru, Brazil
- Episinus implexus (Simon, 1895) – Venezuela
- Episinus israeliensis Levy, 1985 – Israel
- Episinus jiangweni Lin & Li, 2021 – China
- Episinus kitazawai Yaginuma, 1958 – Russia (Kurile Is.), Japan
- Episinus longabdomenus Zhu, 1998 – China
- Episinus macrops Simon, 1903 – Equatorial Guinea, DR Congo
- Episinus maculipes Cavanna, 1876 – Europe, Algeria, Turkey, Caucasus
  - E. m. numidicus Kulczyński, 1905 – Algeria, Tunisia
- Episinus maderianus Kulczyński, 1905 – Canary Islands, Madeira
- Episinus makiharai Okuma, 1994 – Taiwan
- Episinus marignaci (Lessert, 1933) – Angola, South Africa
- Episinus meruensis Tullgren, 1910 – Tanzania
- Episinus mikhailovi Zamani & Marusik, 2021 – Iran
- Episinus mucronatus (Simon, 1894) – Singapore
- Episinus nanyue Yin, 2012 – China
- Episinus papilionaceous F. J. Liu, Agnarsson, J. Liu & Zhu, 2022 – China
- Episinus porteri (Simon, 1901) – Chile, Argentina
- Episinus punctisparsus Yoshida, 1983 – Taiwan
- Episinus rhomboidalis (Simon, 1895) – Malaysia, Myanmar, Singapore
- Episinus similanus Urquhart, 1893 – New Zealand
- Episinus similitudus Urquhart, 1893 – New Zealand
- Episinus taibeli Caporiacco, 1949 – Ethiopia
- Episinus theridioides Simon, 1873 – Spain, France (mainland, Corsica), Italy (Sardinia)
- Episinus tongyani Lin & Li, 2021 – China
- Episinus truncatus Latreille, 1809 – Europe, Turkey, Caucasus, Iran (type species)
- Episinus typicus (Nicolet, 1849) – Chile
- Episinus variacorneus Chen, Peng & Zhao, 1992 – China
- Episinus xiushanicus Zhu, 1998 – China

Formerly included:

- E. bicorniger (Simon, 1894) (Transferred to Janula)
- E. bicornis (Thorell, 1881) (Transferred to Janula)
- E. bicruciatus (Simon, 1895) (Transferred to Janula)
- E. bifrons (Thorell, 1895) (Transferred to Janula)
- E. caudifer Dönitz & Strand, 1906 (Transferred to Moneta)
- E. coercerveus Roberts, 1978 (Transferred to Moneta)
- E. conifer (Urquhart, 1886) (Transferred to Moneta)
- E. erythrophthalmus (Simon, 1894) (Transferred to Janula)
- E. gratiosus Bryant, 1940 (Transferred to Neopisinus)
- E. longipes Keyserling, 1884 (Transferred to Neopisinus)
- E. luteolimbatus (Thorell, 1898) (Transferred to Janula)
- E. malachinus (Simon, 1895) (Transferred to Janula)
- E. marginatus (Thorell, 1898) (Transferred to Janula)
- E. minusculus Gertsch, 1936 (Transferred to Chrosiothes)
- E. mirabilis (Bösenberg & Strand, 1906) (Transferred to Moneta)
- E. modestus (Thorell, 1898) (Transferred to Janula)
- E. nebulosus (Simon, 1895) (Transferred to Janula)
- E. ocreatus (Simon, 1909) (Transferred to Janula)
- E. paiki Seo, 1985 (Transferred to Moneta)
- E. pictus (Simon, 1895) (Transferred to Janula)
- E. recifensis Levi, 1964 (Transferred to Neopisinus)
- E. salobrensis (Simon, 1895) (Transferred to Janula)
- E. spinigeroides Zhu & Song, 1992 (Transferred to Moneta)
- E. tanikawai Yoshida, 1991 (Transferred to Moneta)
- E. taprobanicus (Simon, 1895) (Transferred to Janula)
- E. yoshimurai Yoshida, 1983 (Transferred to Moneta)

Nomen dubium

- E. americanus Nicolet, 1849
