= Episinus marignaci =

Angola Butterfly Comb-Foot Spider

Scientific classification
- Kingdom: Animalia
- Phylum: Arthropoda
- Subphylum: Chelicerata
- Class: Arachnida
- Order: Araneae
- Infraorder: Araneomorphae
- Family: Theridiidae
- Genus: Episinus
- Species: E. marignaci

Binomial name
- Episinus marignaci (Lessert, 1933)

Synonyms
- Episinopsis marignaci Lessert, 1933

Species of spider

Episinus marignaci is a species of spider in the family Theridiidae. It is commonly known as the Angola butterfly comb-foot spider.

== Distribution ==
Episinus marignaci is found in Angola and South Africa.

In South Africa, it is recorded from three provinces: Eastern Cape, KwaZulu-Natal, and Limpopo. Locations include Addo Elephant National Park, iSimangaliso Wetland Park (uMkhuze Game Reserve), Umgeni Valley Nature Reserve, and Mphaphuli Cycad Reserve.

== Habitat and ecology ==
These spiders have been found at ground level in low vegetation. This species has been sampled from the Savanna and Thicket biomes at altitudes ranging from 83 to 586 m.

== Conservation ==
Episinus marignaci is listed as Least Concern by the South African National Biodiversity Institute due to its wide geographical range. There are no significant threats to this species. It is protected in Addo Elephant National Park, uMkhuze Game Reserve, and Umgeni Valley Nature Reserve.

== Taxonomy ==
Episinus marignaci was originally described by Lessert in 1933 as Episinopsis marignaci from Angola. The species is known only from the female. The two species E. marignaci and E. bilineatus can easily be confused and need to be re-examined and described.
