= Jennycliff Bay =

Coastal bay in Plymouth, Devon

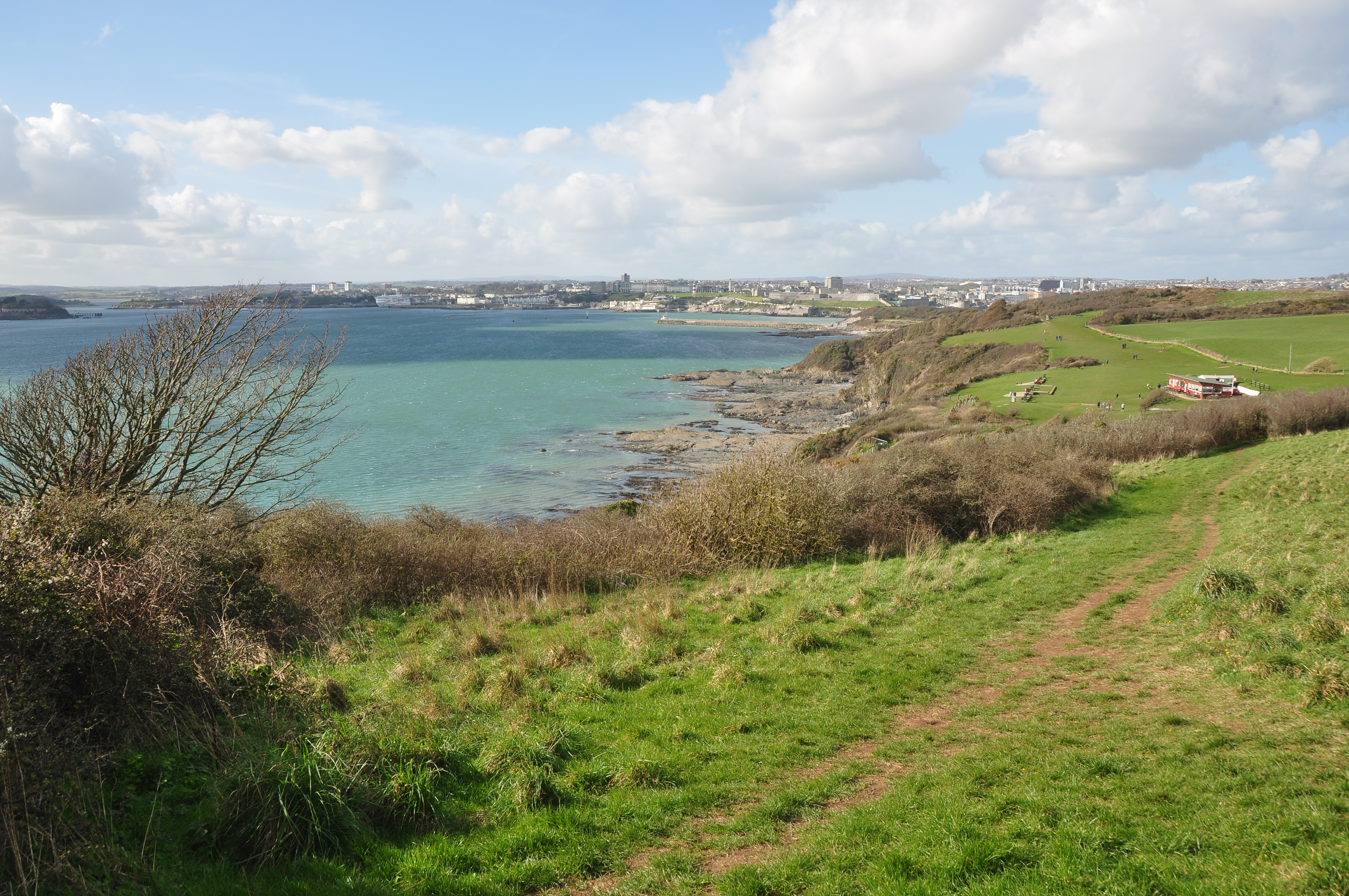
- South West Coast Path at Jennycliff

- Location within Plymouth
- Location: Plymouth
- Coordinates: 50.35208°N 4.12078°W
- Type: Bay
- Managing agency: Plymouth City Council
- Website: www.southdevonaonb.org.uk/explore-wembury/jennycliff-bay-and-plymouth-sound

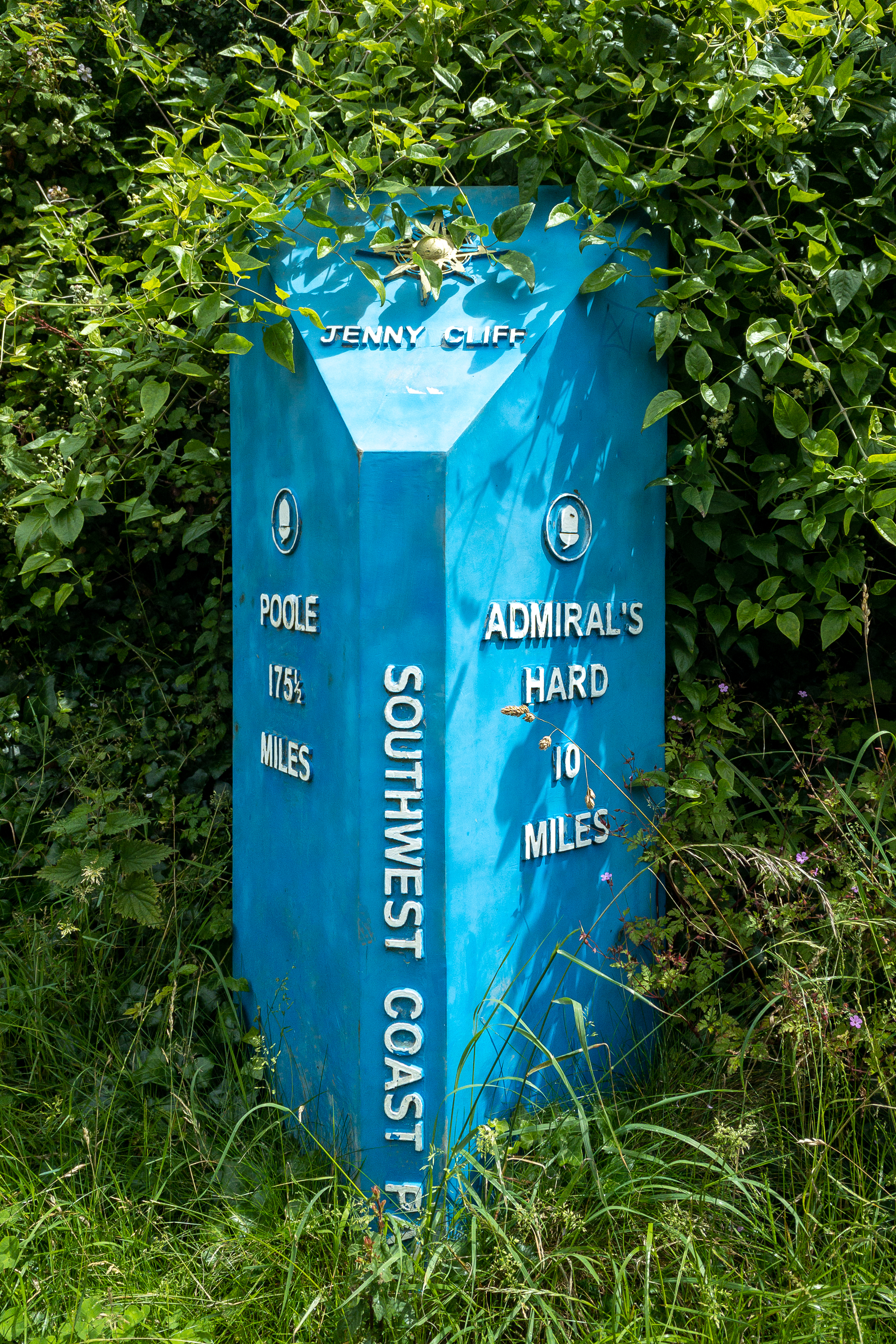
South West Coast Path marker at Jennycliff

Jennycliff Bay (often used interchangeably with Jennycliff) is a bay on the South West Coast Path in Plymouth, Devon, England. It is managed by Plymouth City Council and is both designated a County Wildlife Site (CWS) and part of the Site of Special Scientific Interest (SSSI) known as Plymouth Sound, Shores and Cliffs. From its upper grassy area, the bay overlooks Mount Batten and Plymouth Sound.

== Nature ==
=== Site of Special Scientific Interest ===
Jennycliff Bay forms part of the Site of Special Scientific Interest (SSSI) known as Plymouth Sound, Shores and Cliffs. It is a Designated Site within the "Jennycliff to Bovisand" management unit and said to be in favourable condition.

=== County Wildlife Site ===
Jennycliff Bay is also designated a County Wildlife Site (CWS). This is primarily because it contains four Nationally Scarce species:

- Pale St John's Wort
- Maidenhair fern
- Dwarf elder
- Round-leaved cranesbill

The Site Management Statement for Jennycliff CWS reports sightings of "Devon notable species" including ivy broomrape, dotted sedge, distant sedge, sea rocket and sea spleenwort. Further, the spider Episinus maculipes has been observed.

== Geology ==
The cliff face is inclined and the shore is composed of steep broken bedrock and boulders of various sizes.
