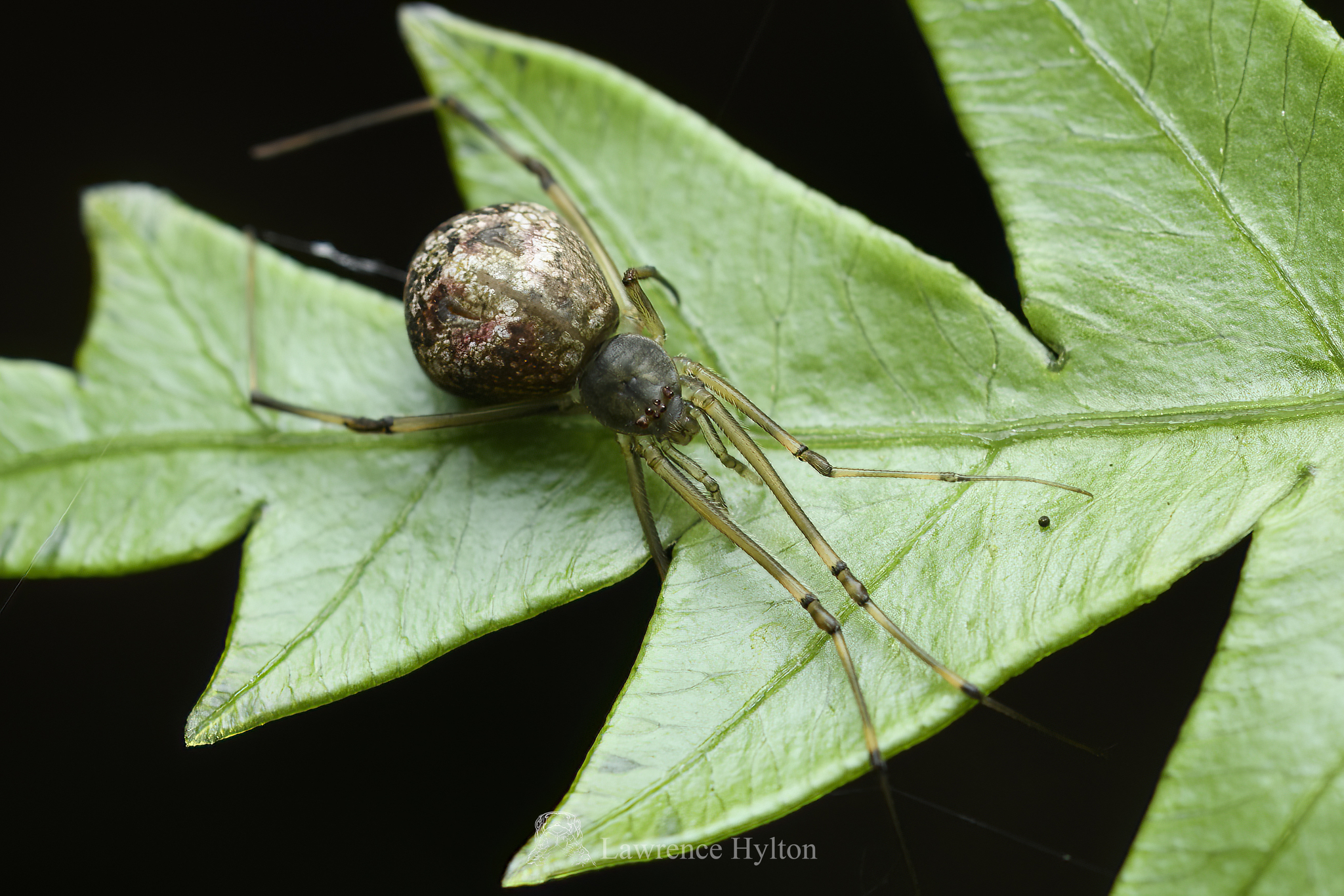
- female from Hong Kong
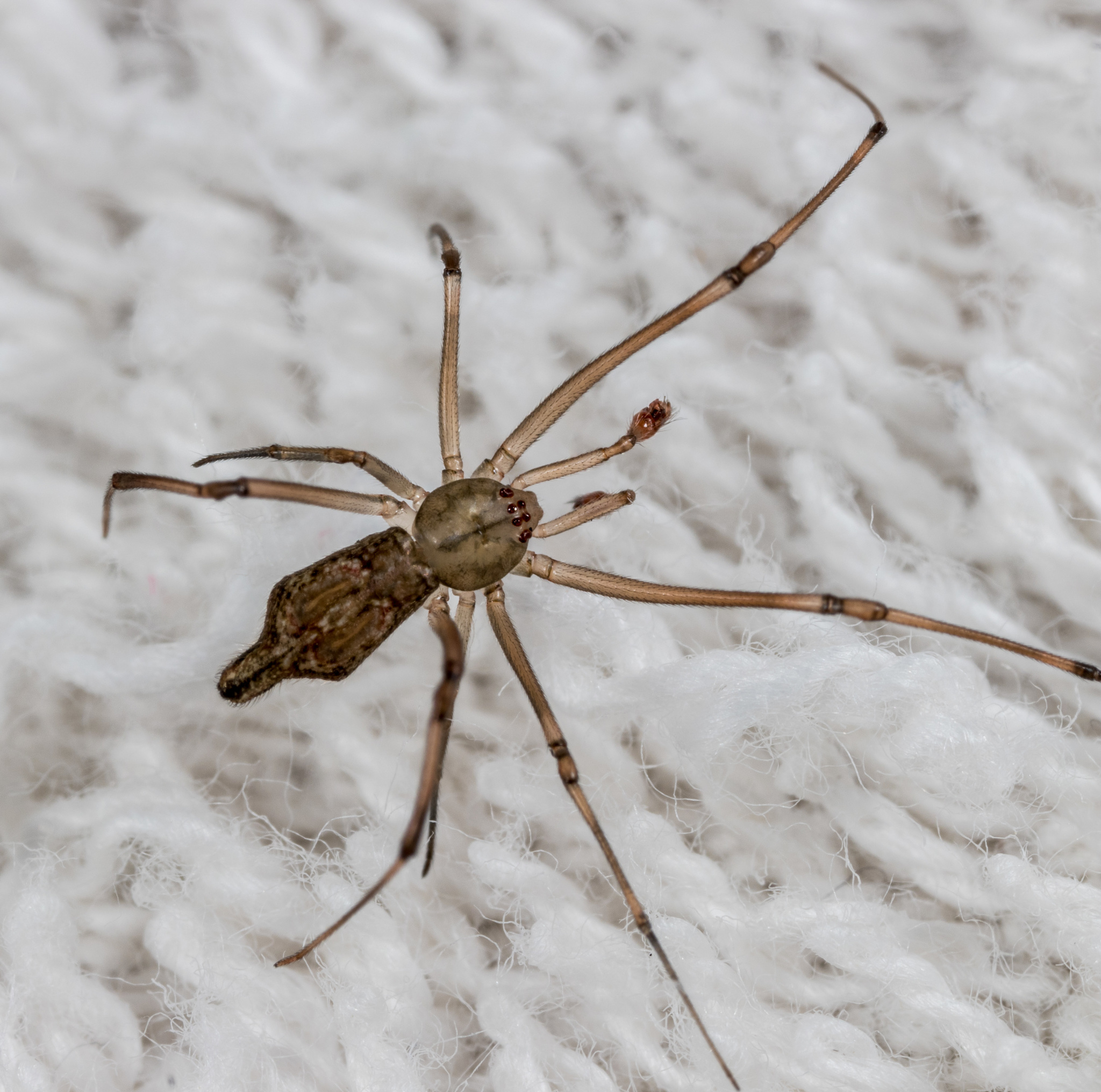
- male from Hong Kong

Scientific classification
- Kingdom: Animalia
- Phylum: Arthropoda
- Subphylum: Chelicerata
- Class: Arachnida
- Order: Araneae
- Infraorder: Araneomorphae
- Family: Theridiidae
- Genus: Moneta
- Species: M. mirabilis

Binomial name
- Moneta mirabilis (Bösenberg & Strand, 1906)

Synonyms
- Hyptimorpha mirabilis Bösenberg & Strand, 1906

= Moneta mirabilis =

Species of spider

Moneta mirabilis is a species of spider in the family Theridiidae (comb-footed spiders). It is found across East Asia and Southeast Asia, including China, Korea, Laos, Malaysia, Taiwan, and Japan.

== Taxonomy ==
The species was originally described as Hyptimorpha mirabilis by Bösenberg and Strand in 1906. It was later transferred to the genus Moneta by Okuma in 1994, who also designated it as the type species for a taxonomic revision.

== Distribution ==
M. mirabilis has a wide distribution across East and Southeast Asia. It has been recorded from China, Korea, Laos, Malaysia, Taiwan, and Japan, representing one of the more widely distributed species in the genus Moneta.

== Description ==
Based on the detailed morphological description by Zhu (1998), females of M. mirabilis have a body length of 5.0-6.0 mm. The carapace is light yellowish-brown with dark black marginal stripes and measures 1.7-2.0 mm in length and 1.6-1.85 mm in width. The abdomen is light yellowish-brown dorsally with light black spots and many small light reddish-white scale-like spots.

Males are slightly smaller, with a body length of approximately 4.9 mm and similar coloration to females. The legs show a distinctive pattern with the femora being light yellowish-brown, while the metatarsi and tarsi of legs III and IV, along with all patellae, are light blackish-brown.
