= Episinus similanus =

Conservation status
- Data Deficient (NZ TCS)

Scientific classification
- Domain: Eukaryota
- Kingdom: Animalia
- Phylum: Arthropoda
- Subphylum: Chelicerata
- Class: Arachnida
- Order: Araneae
- Infraorder: Araneomorphae
- Family: Theridiidae
- Genus: Episinus
- Species: E. similanus

Binomial name
- Episinus similanus Urquhart, 1893

Species of spider

Episinus similanus is a species of Theridiidae spider endemic to New Zealand.

== Taxonomy ==
This species was described in 1893 by Arthur Urquhart from female specimens.

== Description ==
The female is recorded at 10.7mm in length. The cephalothorax is yellow ochreous with brow markings dorsally. The legs are pale yellow.

== Distribution ==
This species is only known from Waikato, New Zealand.

== Conservation status ==
Under the New Zealand Threat Classification System, this species is listed as "Data Deficient" with the qualifiers of "Data Poor: Size", "Data Poor: Trend" and "One Location".
