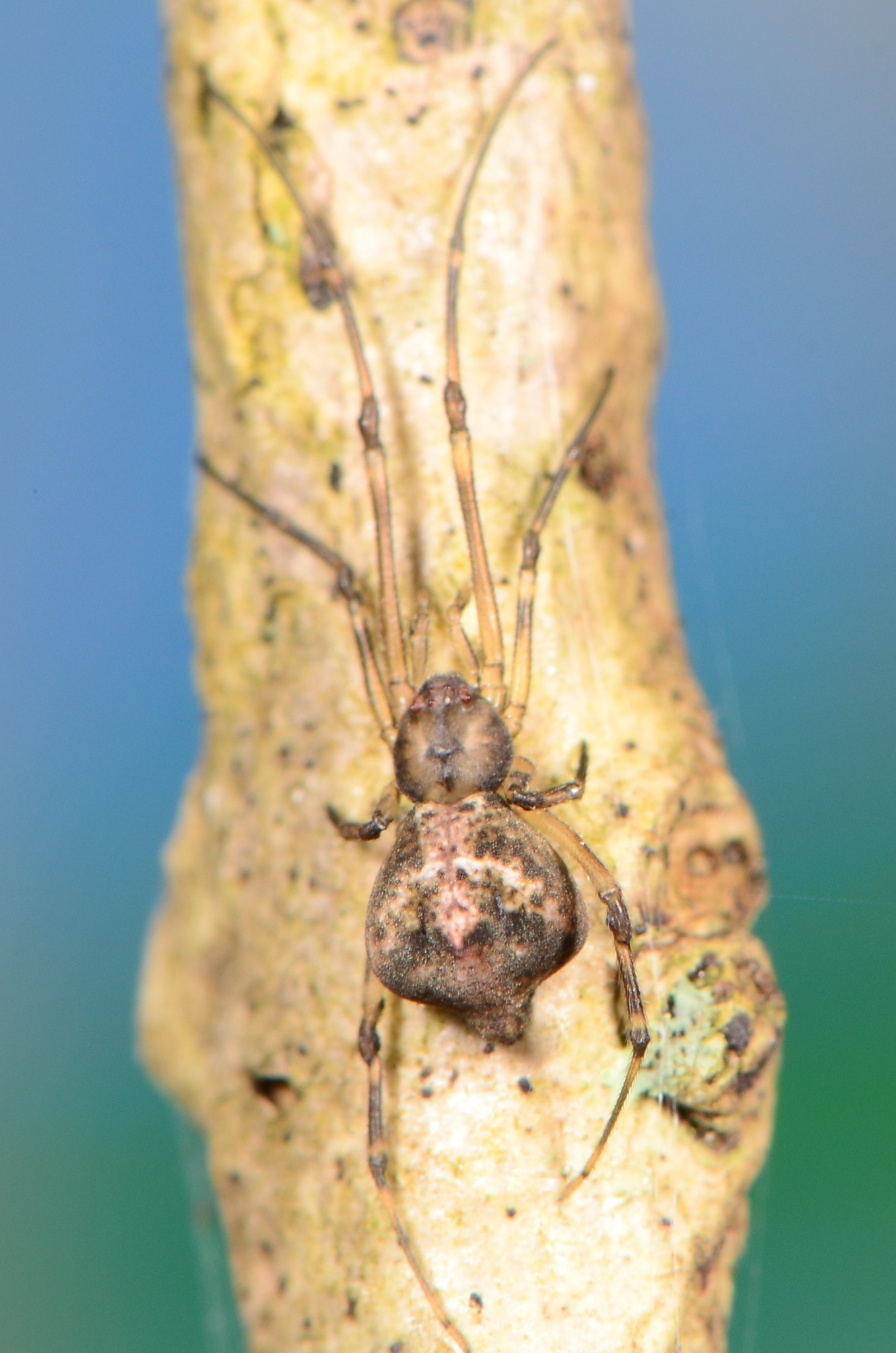
- Female

Scientific classification
- Kingdom: Animalia
- Phylum: Arthropoda
- Subphylum: Chelicerata
- Class: Arachnida
- Order: Araneae
- Infraorder: Araneomorphae
- Family: Theridiidae
- Genus: Episinus
- Species: E. bishopi

Binomial name
- Episinus bishopi (Lessert, 1929)

Synonyms
- Episinopsis bishopi Lessert, 1929

= Episinus bishopi =

Congo Butterfly Comb-Foot Spider

Species of spider

Episinus bishopi is a species of spider in the family Theridiidae. It is commonly known as the Congo butterfly comb-foot spider.

== Distribution ==
Episinus bishopi is found in Democratic Republic of the Congo and South Africa.

In South Africa, it is recorded from the provinces Eastern Cape, Free State, KwaZulu-Natal, and Western Cape. Locations include Addo Elephant National Park, Wyndford Guest Farm in Fouriesburg, Wakefield Farm, Baynesfield in the Natal Midlands, and Windmeul in Ridgeback Paarl.

== Gallery ==
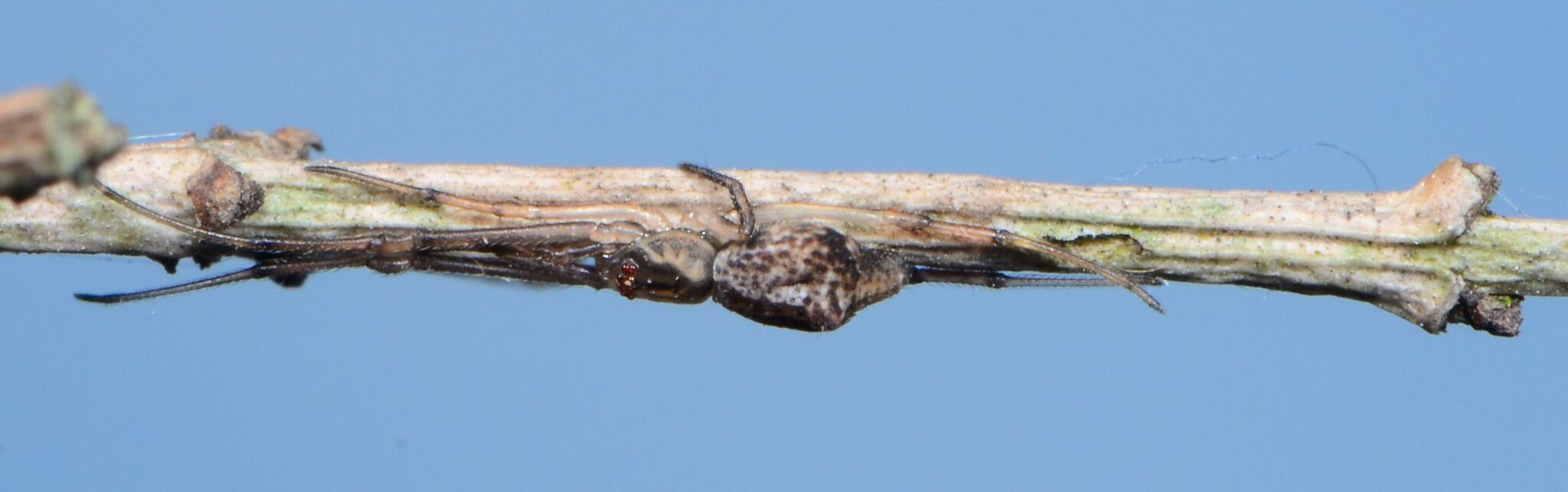
female

== Habitat and ecology ==
The spiders were found at ground level between low vegetation from the Grassland, Fynbos, and Thicket biomes at altitudes ranging from 233 to 1645 m.

== Conservation ==
Episinus bishopi is listed as Least Concern by the South African National Biodiversity Institute. Although the species is presently known only from one sex, it has a wide geographical range. There are no significant threats to this species. It is protected in Addo National Park.

== Taxonomy ==
Episinus bishopi was originally described by Lessert in 1929 as Episinopsis bishopi from the Democratic Republic of the Congo. The species is known only from the male.

== See also ==
- Glossary of spider terms
