= Janula taprobanica =

Scientific classification
- Kingdom: Animalia
- Phylum: Arthropoda
- Subphylum: Chelicerata
- Class: Arachnida
- Order: Araneae
- Infraorder: Araneomorphae
- Family: Theridiidae
- Genus: Janula
- Species: J. taprobanica

Binomial name
- Janula taprobanica (Simon, 1895)

Synonyms
- Janulus taprobanicus Simon, 1895; Episinus taprobanicus Simon, 1895

Species of spider

Janula taprobanica, is a species of spider of the genus Janula. It is endemic to Sri Lanka.
