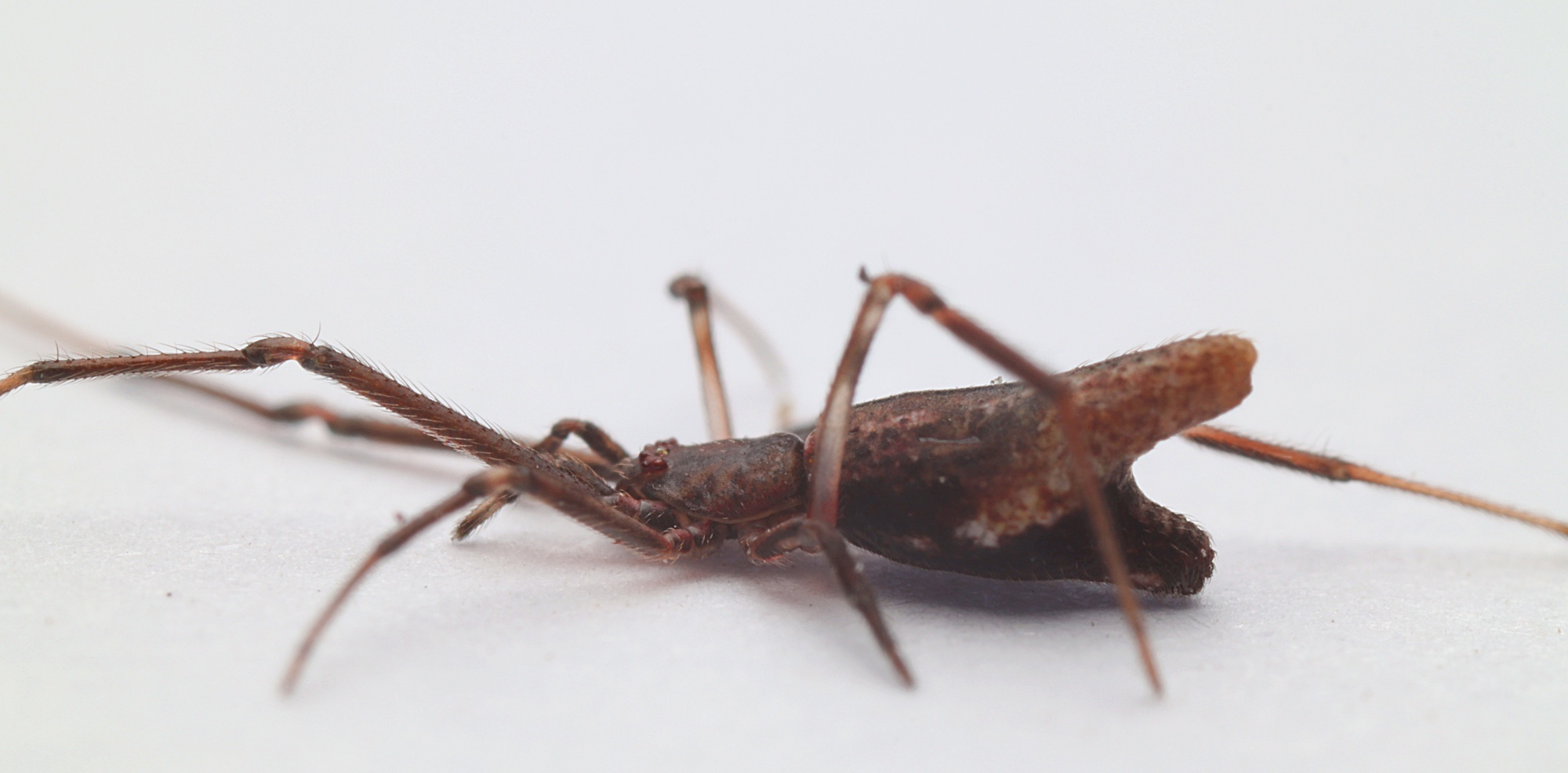

Conservation status
- Not Threatened (NZ TCS)

Scientific classification
- Domain: Eukaryota
- Kingdom: Animalia
- Phylum: Arthropoda
- Subphylum: Chelicerata
- Class: Arachnida
- Order: Araneae
- Infraorder: Araneomorphae
- Family: Theridiidae
- Genus: Moneta
- Species: M. conifera

Binomial name
- Moneta conifera (Urquhart, 1887)

Synonyms
- Ariamnes conifera

= Moneta conifera =

Species of spider

Moneta conifera is a species of cobweb spider that is endemic to New Zealand.

== Taxonomy ==
This species was described as Ariamnes conifera in 1887 by Arthur Urquhart from female specimens. It was moved to the Moneta genus in 1917.

== Description ==
The female is recorded at 3mm in length.

== Distribution ==
This species is known from scattered localities throughout New Zealand.

== Conservation status ==
Under the New Zealand Threat Classification System, this species is listed as "Not Threatened".
