= Episinus antipodianus =

Conservation status
- Not Threatened (NZ TCS)

Scientific classification
- Domain: Eukaryota
- Kingdom: Animalia
- Phylum: Arthropoda
- Subphylum: Chelicerata
- Class: Arachnida
- Order: Araneae
- Infraorder: Araneomorphae
- Family: Theridiidae
- Genus: Episinus
- Species: E. antipodianus

Binomial name
- Episinus antipodianus O. Pickard-Cambridge, 1880

Species of spider

Episinus antipodianus is a species of Theridiidae spider endemic to New Zealand.

== Taxonomy ==
This species was described in 1880 by Octavius Pickard-Cambridge from female specimens.

== Description ==
The female is recorded at 4.87mm in length. The cephalothorax is dark yellow brown. The legs are yellow with dark bands. The abdomen is yellow brown and mottled with brown and black.

== Distribution ==
This species is only known from scattered localities throughout New Zealand.

== Conservation status ==
Under the New Zealand Threat Classification System, this species is listed as "Not Threatened".
