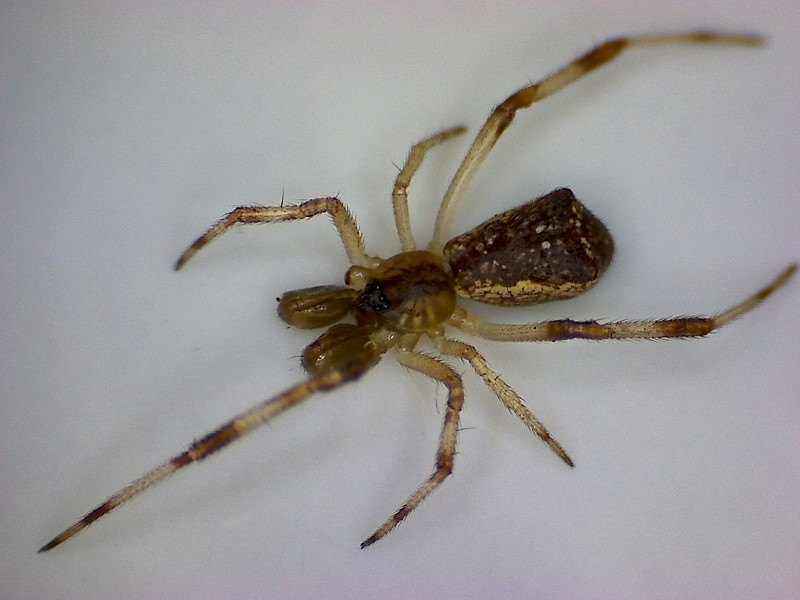

Scientific classification
- Domain: Eukaryota
- Kingdom: Animalia
- Phylum: Arthropoda
- Subphylum: Chelicerata
- Class: Arachnida
- Order: Araneae
- Infraorder: Araneomorphae
- Family: Theridiidae
- Genus: Episinus
- Species: E. angulatus

Binomial name
- Episinus angulatus (Blackwall, 1836)
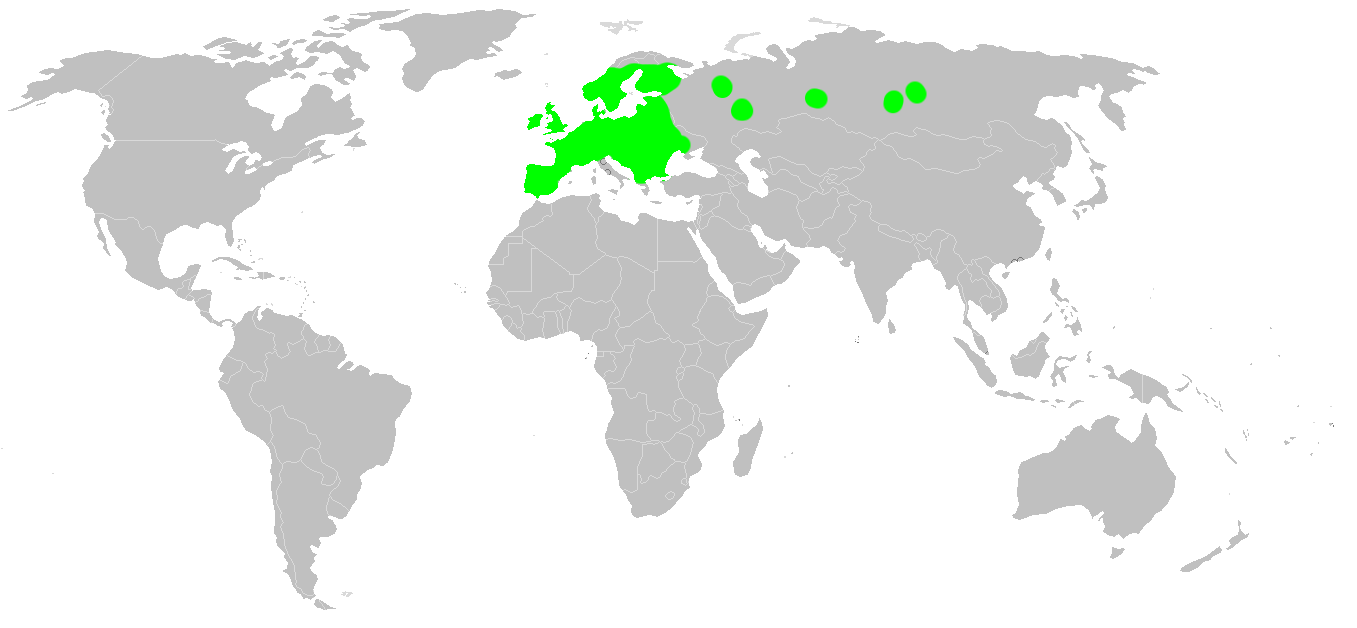

= Episinus angulatus =

Species of spider

Episinus angulatus is a small mottled brownish tangle-web spider, found from Europe to Russia.

Although it is a widespread European species, it is not common. It is notably found in Lithuania.

It can grow up to 5.5mm. The body is rather thin, the flat abdomen broadens a little bit near the end. Adults occur from May to July.

Episinus angulatus is found in low vegetation, bushes or under bark. It lives on forest clearings, on badlands and in gardens. It often rests with its legs stretched in front and behind, resembling a tetragnathid. The web only consists of a few threads that reach from the lower branches of a bush down to the ground. The web has roughly an 'H' form. The lower parts of the web contain sticky globules. Females hang the cocoon from a thread.

It is very similar to Episinus truncatus.
