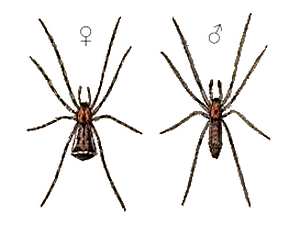

Scientific classification
- Kingdom: Animalia
- Phylum: Arthropoda
- Subphylum: Chelicerata
- Class: Arachnida
- Order: Araneae
- Infraorder: Araneomorphae
- Family: Theridiidae
- Genus: Episinus
- Species: E. truncatus

Binomial name
- Episinus truncatus Latreille, 1809
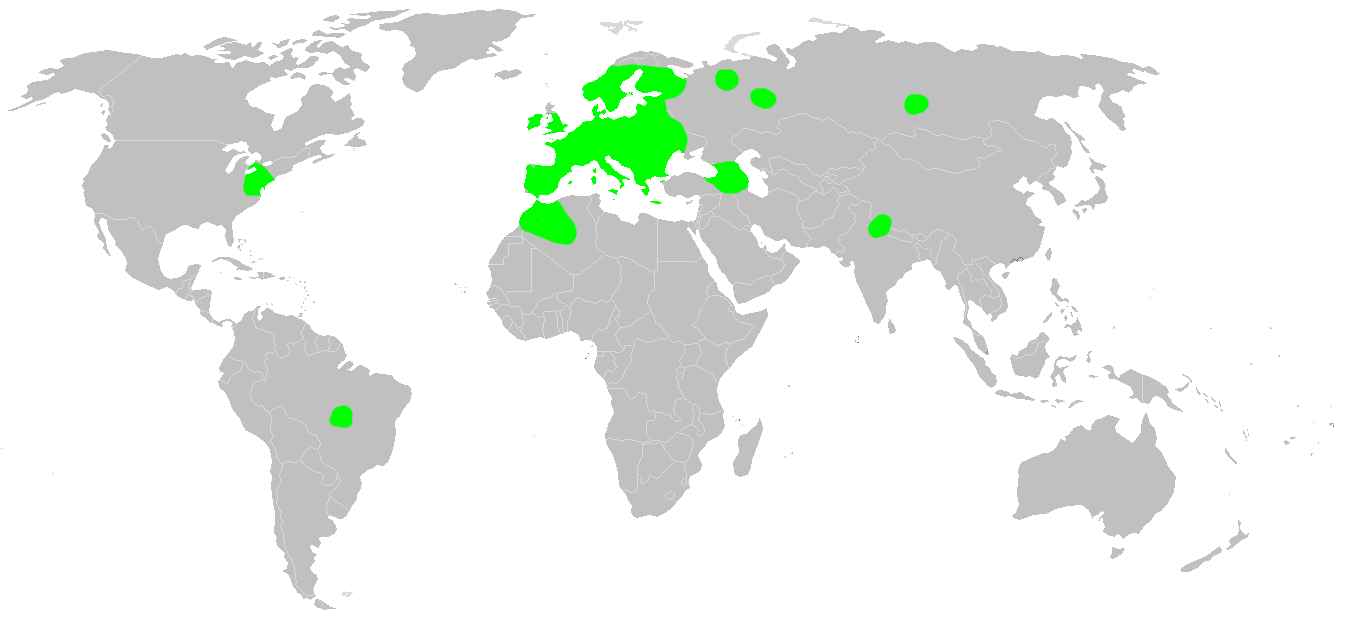

= Episinus truncatus =

Species of spider

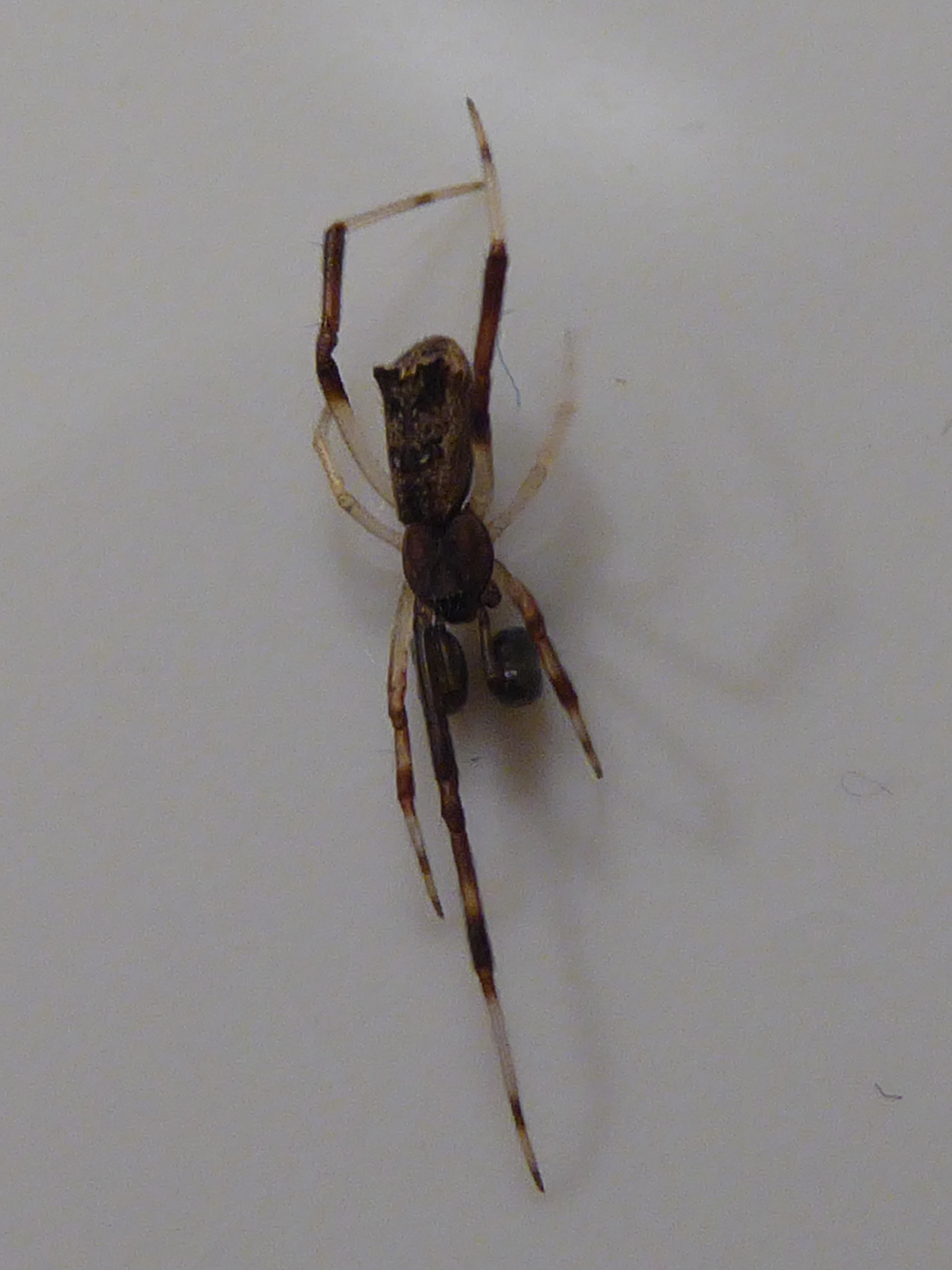
Male Episinus truncatus photographed in Segonzano (Trentino-South Tyrol, Italy)

Episinus truncatus is a small dark tangle-web spider, with a palearctic distribution.

Episinus truncatus is found in Europe. It is notably found in Lithuania. In England, it is mostly found on heather and sometimes on coastal grassland.

It spins a simple web near the ground. It can grow up to 4 mm and is very similar to Episinus angulatus.
