= Plymouth Sound, Shores and Cliffs =

Plymouth Sound Shores and Cliffs
- Site of Special Scientific Interest
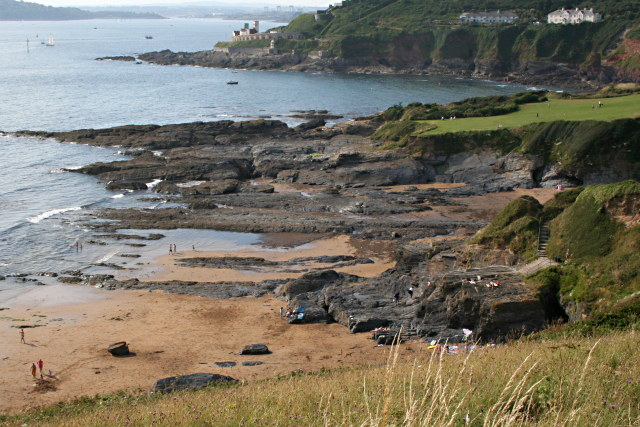

- Location within Devon
- Location of Plymouth Sound Shores and Cliffs.
- Area of search: Devon; Cornwall
- Coordinates: 50.3461°N 4.12208°W
- Interest: Geological
- Area: 44.3 hectares (0.443 km^{2}; 0.171 sq mi)
- Notification date: 1997

Plymouth Sound, Shores and Cliffs is a Site of Special Scientific Interest (SSSI) around the Plymouth Sound, a large area of water where the River Plym and Tamar meet. It stretches across the two ceremonial counties of Devon and Cornwall and the unitary authority area of Plymouth. It contains fossils of plants and sea creatures and its cliffs show a timeline of the Middle to Early Devonian period hundreds of millions of years ago.

== Geology ==
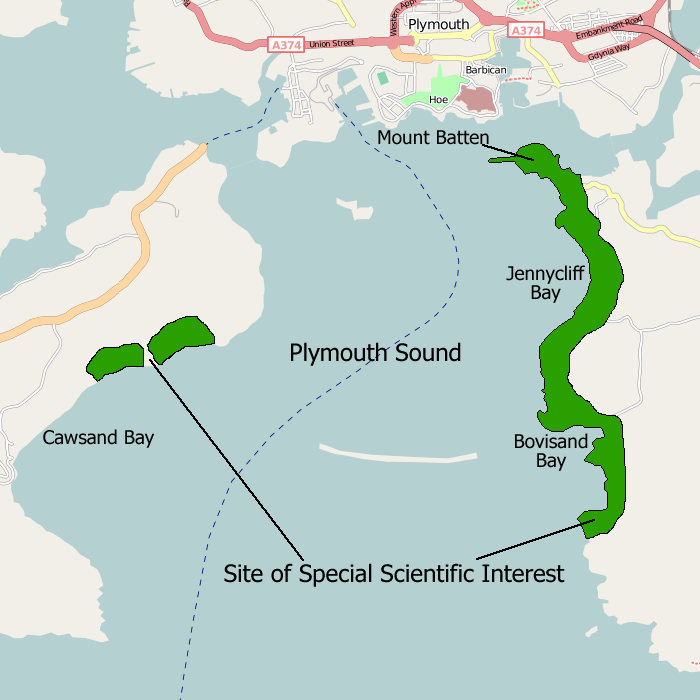
Location of the SSSI within Plymouth Sound

Lower to early Middle Devonian units of rock are visible from sections through the coastal cliffs and intertidal zones, which were laid down 417–354 million years ago. There are fossil remains of corals, brachiopods, bryozoa, gastropods, rare orthoconic nautiloids, ostracods, trilobites, phacopids), crinoids, ostracoderm and acanthodian fish.

Jennycliff Bay has steeply inclined folds, which flexure into open recumbent folds — some with chevron form. The folds have developed cleavage in the slate and in the siltstones and sandstones, although it is more widely spaced throughout the silt and sandstones. To the south, the cleavage dips at moderate low angles and the strata, which become overturned in places, dip steeply. The original direction of the strata can be established using the graded and cross-bedding of sedimentary structures. It demonstrates that the section is situated on the overturned, steep or northern limb of the Dartmouth Antiform, which can be traced from Newquay to Dartmouth. This is evidence a period of tectonic plate collision between 330 and 300 million years ago, which exerted pressure on the rock. Folds of three generations with cleavages are visible through the section in Bovisand Bay. Generally, the first generation folds have gently southern dipping limbs which are overturned or steep. The cleavage consistently dips about 40 degrees south. This indicates that this section has the Dartmouth Antiform passing through it. The far south consists of red and green slates with sandstones that were deposited in rivers and lakes.

On the western flank (Cornwall), there are harder rocks such as Staddon Grit, which form a headland from Staddon Point. There are also deposits of sandstones in the shape of marine sand bars. Along most of the coast dramatic faults and folds in the rocks can be seen and, in some places, a chevron pattern is visible.
