= Episinus amoenus =

Scientific classification
- Domain: Eukaryota
- Kingdom: Animalia
- Phylum: Arthropoda
- Subphylum: Chelicerata
- Class: Arachnida
- Order: Araneae
- Infraorder: Araneomorphae
- Family: Theridiidae
- Genus: Episinus
- Species: E. amoenus

Binomial name
- Episinus amoenus Banks, 1911

Species of spider

Episinus amoenus is a species of cobweb spider in the family Theridiidae. It is found in the United States and Mexico.
