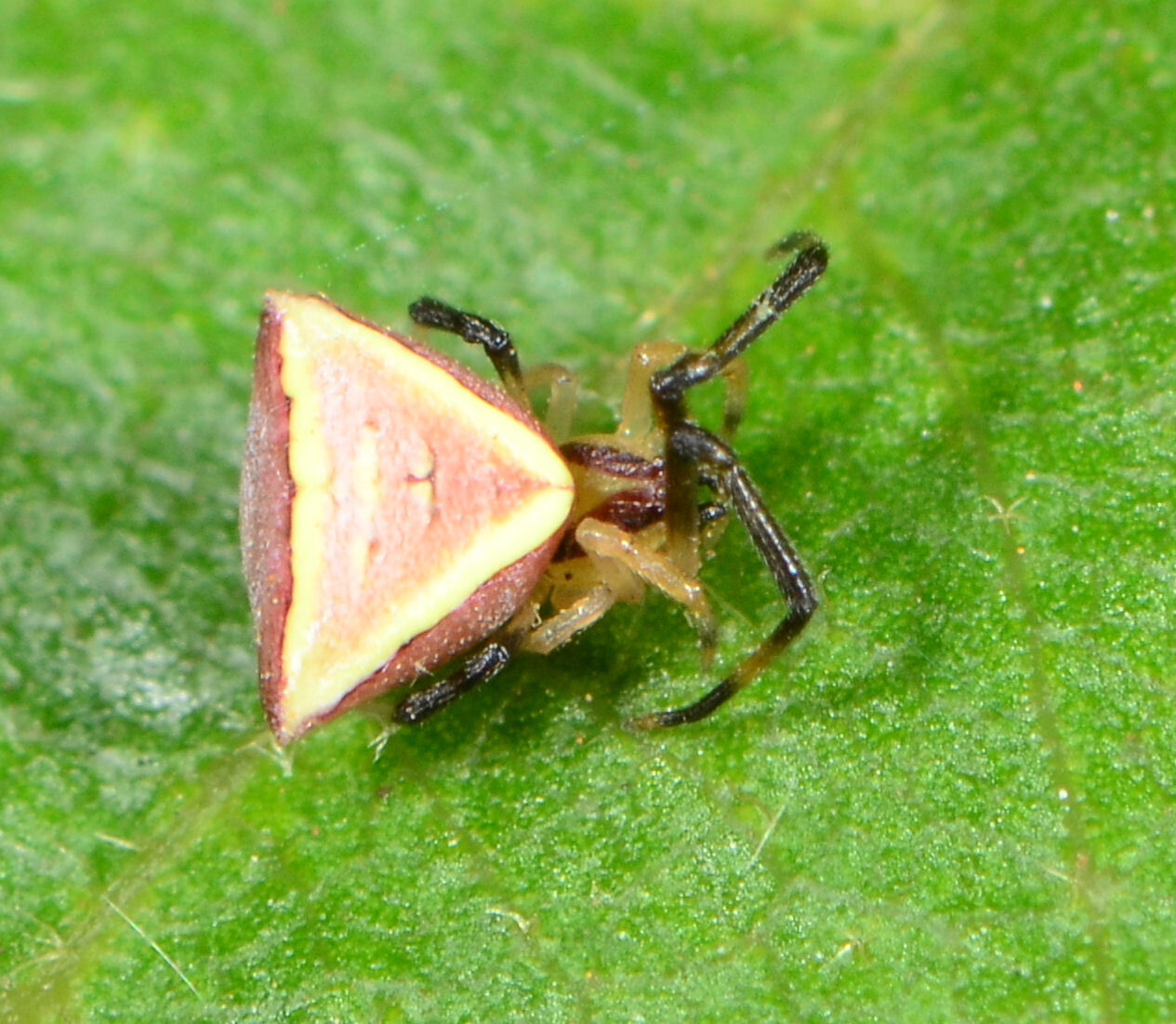
- Female
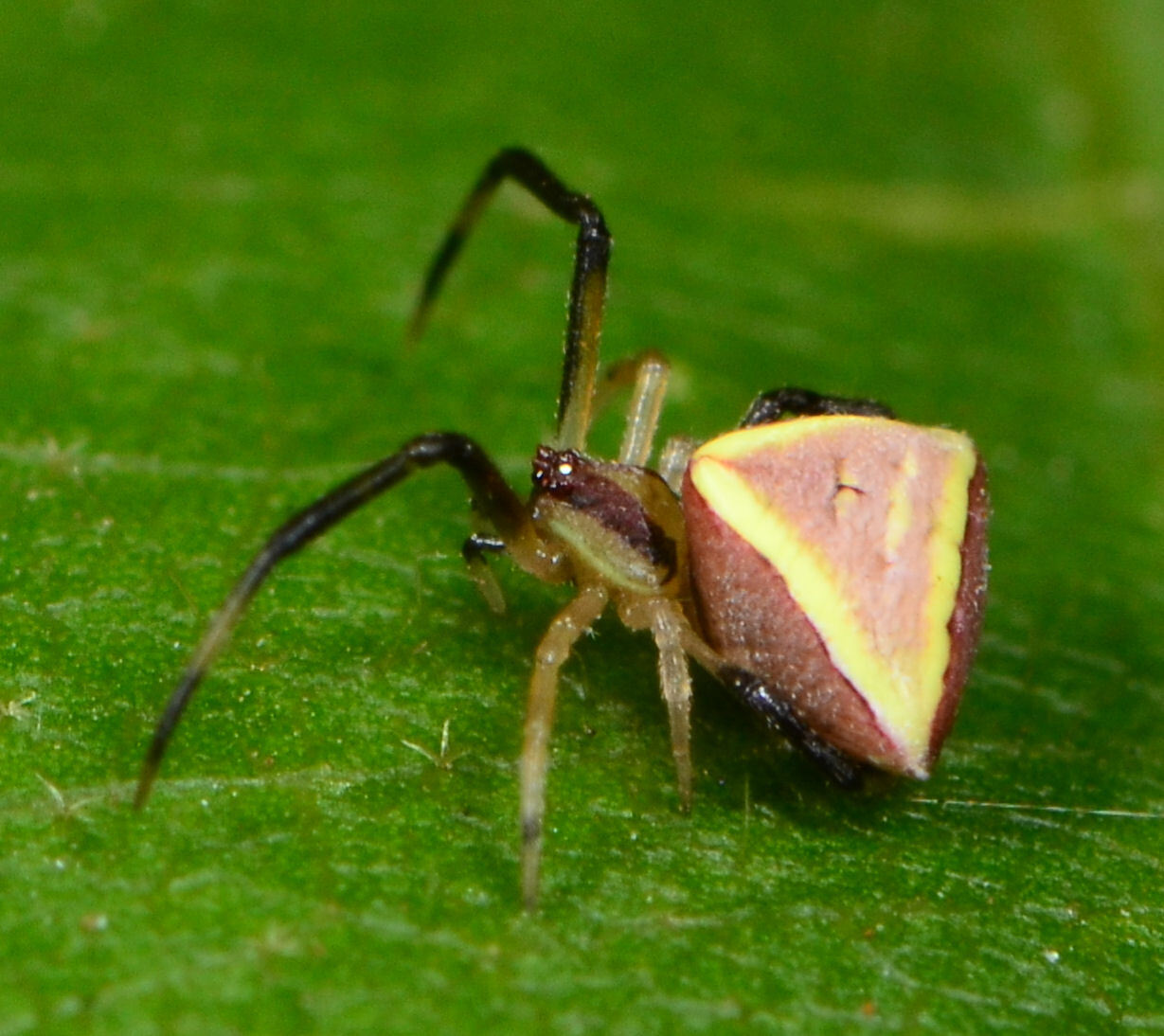
- Female

Scientific classification
- Kingdom: Animalia
- Phylum: Arthropoda
- Subphylum: Chelicerata
- Class: Arachnida
- Order: Araneae
- Infraorder: Araneomorphae
- Family: Theridiidae
- Genus: Episinus
- Species: E. bilineatus

Binomial name
- Episinus bilineatus Simon, 1894

= Episinus bilineatus =

Butterfly Comb-Foot Spider

Species of spider

Episinus bilineatus is a species of spider in the family Theridiidae. It is commonly known as the butterfly comb-foot spider.

== Distribution ==
Episinus bilineatus is found in Botswana, Lesotho, and South Africa.

In South Africa, it is recorded from all nine provinces.

== Description ==
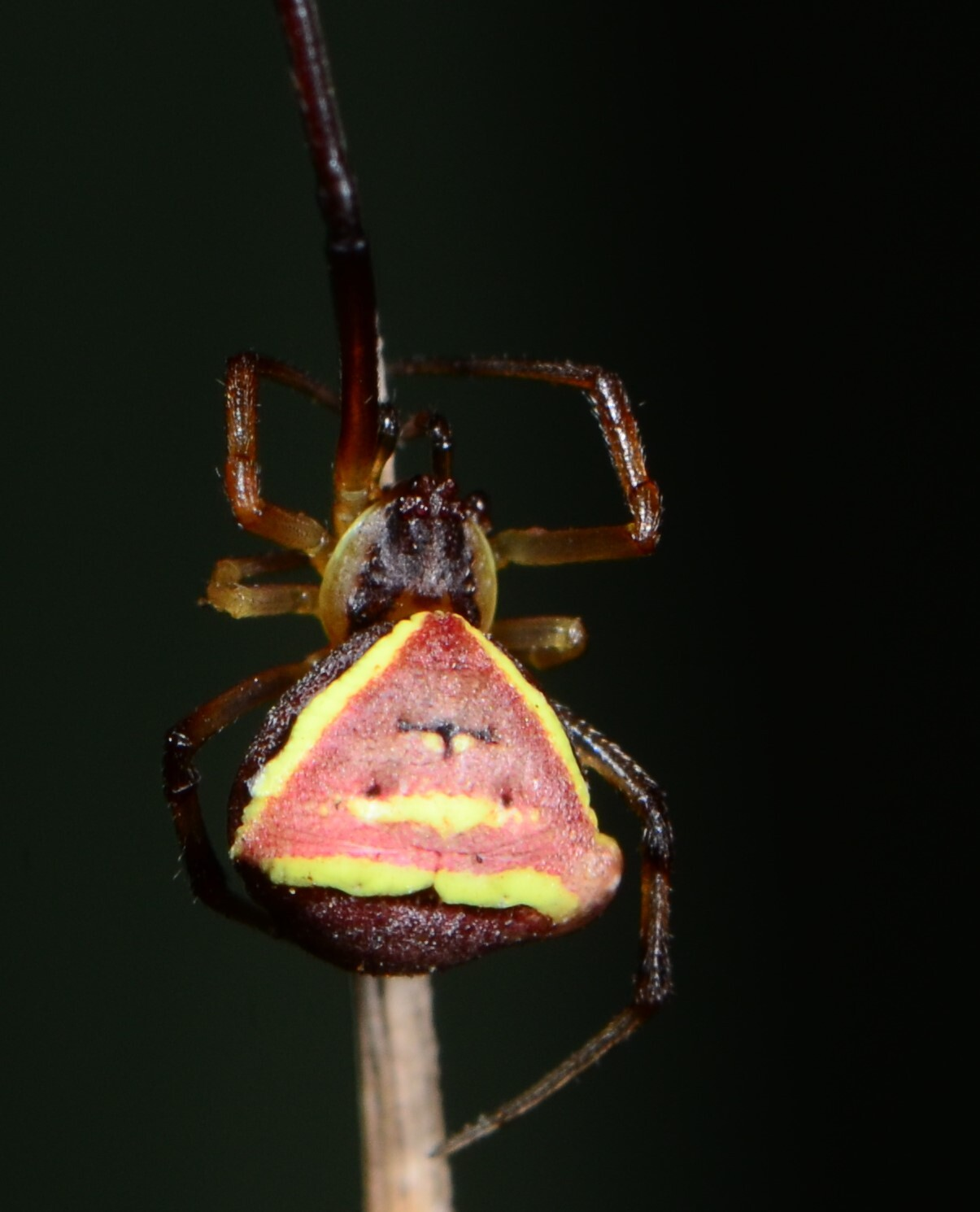
female

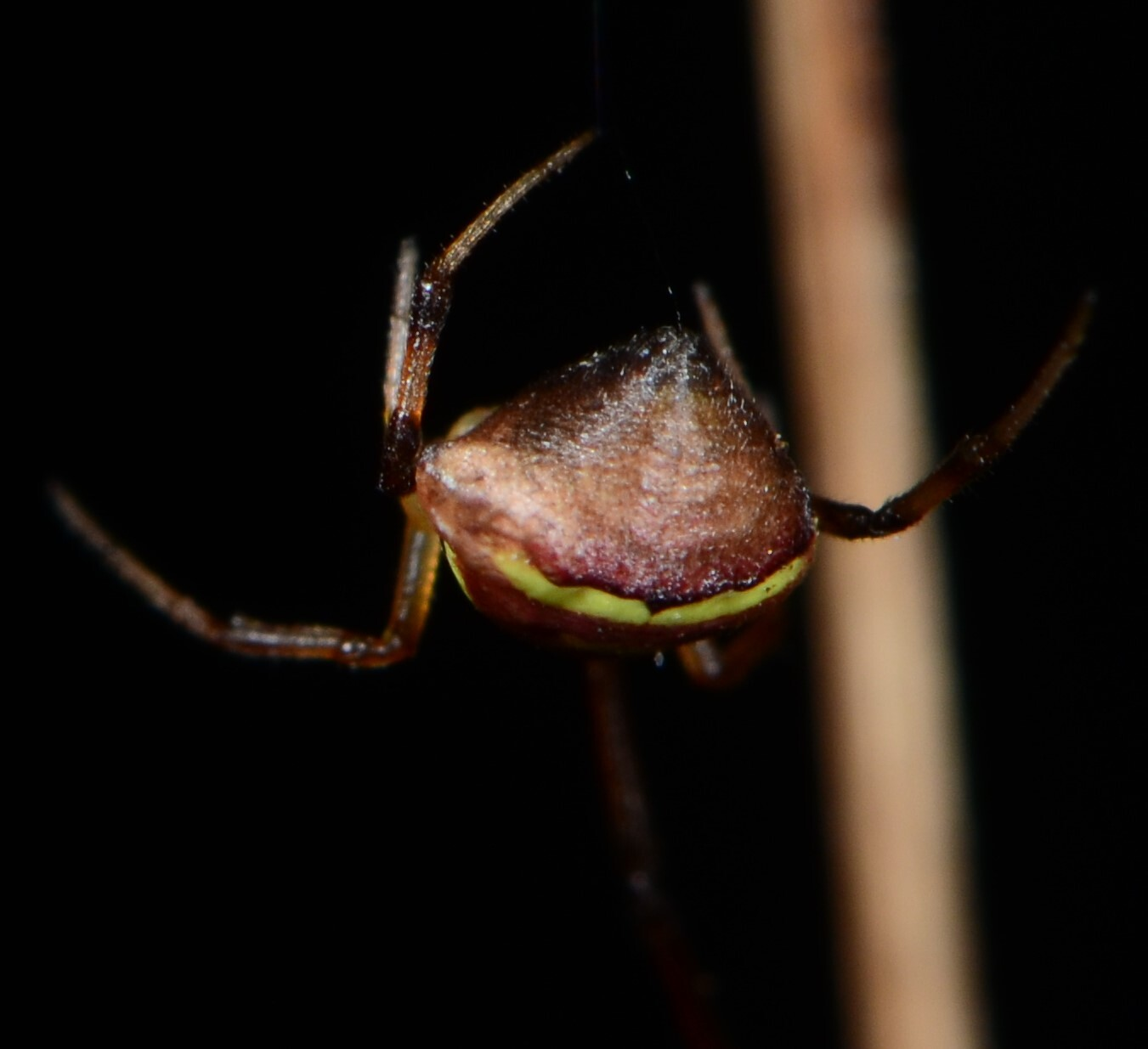
female

== Habitat and ecology ==
Episinus bilineatus is found at ground level between low vegetation, making a very simple H or Y-shaped web near ground level. Courtship takes place in summer. The egg-sac is white and spherical and has a coarse loop of silk around it.

It was sampled from the Fynbos, Indian Ocean Coastal Belt, Savanna, and Thicket biomes at altitudes ranging from 4 to 1703 m.

== Conservation ==
Episinus bilineatus is listed as Least Concern by the South African National Biodiversity Institute due to its wide geographical range. There are no significant threats to this species. It is protected in more than ten protected areas.

== Taxonomy ==
Episinus bilineatus was described by Eugène Simon in 1894 based on a juvenile specimen, with the type locality only given as Transvaal. The description was based on an immature specimen without drawings.
