= Neopisinus =

Scientific classification
- Kingdom: Animalia
- Phylum: Arthropoda
- Subphylum: Chelicerata
- Class: Arachnida
- Order: Araneae
- Infraorder: Araneomorphae
- Family: Theridiidae
- Genus: Neopisinus; Marques, Buckup & Rodrigues, 2011

Type species
- N. fiapo Marques, Buckup & Rodrigues, 2011

Species
- 9, see text

Genus of spiders

Neopisinus is a genus of comb-footed spiders that was first described by M. A. L. Marques, E. H. Buckup & E. N. L. Rodrigues in 2011.

== Species ==
As of May 2020 it contains nine species, found in South America, the Caribbean, the United States, Mexico, and Panama:

- Neopisinus bigibbosus (O. Pickard-Cambridge, 1896) – Mexico, Panama
- Neopisinus bruneoviridis (Mello-Leitão, 1948) – Panama, Trinidad to Brazil
- Neopisinus cognatus (O. Pickard-Cambridge, 1893) – USA to Peru, Brazil
- Neopisinus fiapo Marques, Buckup & Rodrigues, 2011 (type) – Brazil
- Neopisinus gratiosus (Bryant, 1940) – Cuba, Hispaniola
- Neopisinus longipes (Keyserling, 1884) – Peru, Brazil
- Neopisinus putus (O. Pickard-Cambridge, 1894) – Mexico to Panama
- Neopisinus recifensis (Levi, 1964) – Brazil
- Neopisinus urucu Marques, Buckup & Rodrigues, 2011 – Brazil
