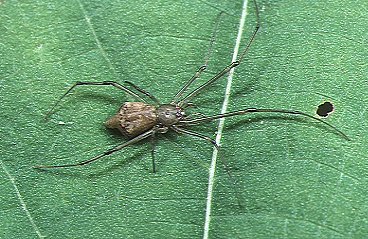
- M. tanikawai, female from Okinawa

Scientific classification
- Kingdom: Animalia
- Phylum: Arthropoda
- Subphylum: Chelicerata
- Class: Arachnida
- Order: Araneae
- Infraorder: Araneomorphae
- Family: Theridiidae
- Genus: Moneta; O. Pickard-Cambridge, 1871

Type species
- M. spinigera O. Pickard-Cambridge, 1871

Species
- 21, see text

= Moneta (spider) =

Genus of spiders

Moneta is a genus of comb-footed spiders that was first described by Octavius Pickard-Cambridge in 1871.

== Species ==
As of May 2020 it contains twenty-one species:

- Moneta australis (Keyserling, 1890) – Australia (Queensland)
- Moneta baoae Yin, 2012 – China
- Moneta caudifera (Dönitz & Strand, 1906) – Russia (Far East), China, Korea, Japan
- Moneta coercervea (Roberts, 1978) – Seychelles
- Moneta conifera (Urquhart, 1887) – New Zealand
- Moneta furva Yin, 2012 – China
- Moneta grandis Simon, 1905 – India
- Moneta hunanica Zhu, 1998 – China
- Moneta longicauda Simon, 1908 – Australia (Western Australia)
- Moneta mirabilis (Bösenberg & Strand, 1906) – China, Korea, Laos, Malaysia, Taiwan, Japan
- Moneta orientalis Simon, 1909 – Vietnam
- Moneta spinigera O. Pickard-Cambridge, 1871 (type) – Africa, Asia
- Moneta spinigeroides (Zhu & Song, 1992) – China
- Moneta subspinigera Zhu, 1998 – China
- Moneta tanikawai (Yoshida, 1991) – Japan
- Moneta triquetra Simon, 1889 – New Caledonia
- Moneta tumida Zhu, 1998 – China
- Moneta tumulicola Zhu, 1998 – China
- Moneta uncinata Zhu, 1998 – China
- Moneta variabilis Rainbow, 1920 – Australia (Lord Howe Is.)
- Moneta yoshimurai (Yoshida, 1983) – Taiwan

In synonymy:

- M. paiki (Seo, 1985) = Moneta caudifera (Dönitz & Strand, 1906)
