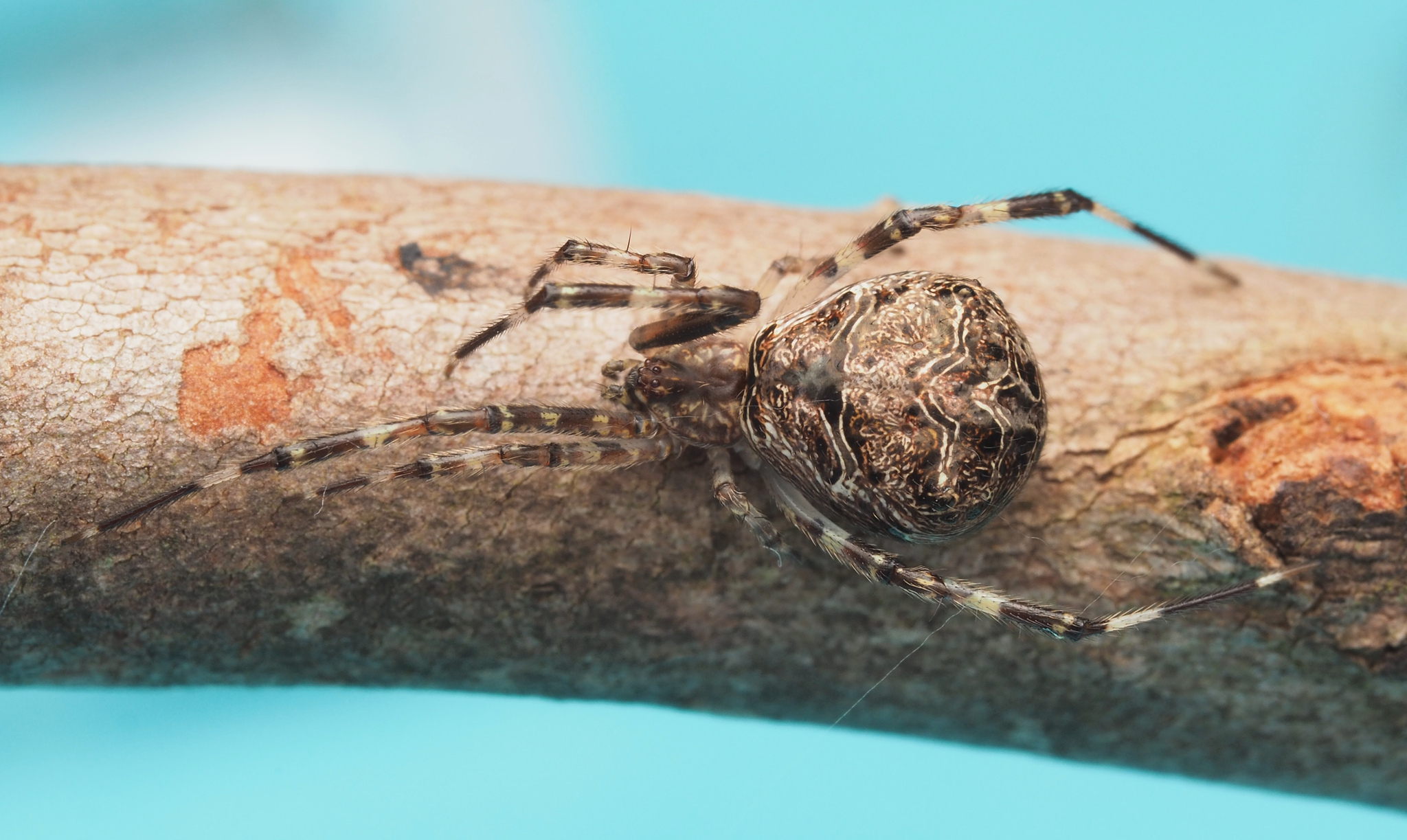
- J. bicornis from Australia

Scientific classification
- Kingdom: Animalia
- Phylum: Arthropoda
- Subphylum: Chelicerata
- Class: Arachnida
- Order: Araneae
- Infraorder: Araneomorphae
- Family: Theridiidae
- Genus: Janula; Strand, 1932

Type species
- J. bicornis (Thorell, 1881)

Species
- 44, see text

Synonyms
- Monetoculus Wunderlich, 2008

= Janula =

Genus of spiders

Janula is a genus of comb-footed spiders that was first described by Embrik Strand in 1932. It is a senior synonym of Monetoculus.

== Species ==
As of September 2022 it contains forty-four species, found in the Caribbean, South America, Asia, Panama, and Queensland:

- Janula aspus (Levi, 1964) – Nicaragua
- Janula batman Yoshida & Koh, 2011 – Borneo
- Janula bicornigera (Simon, 1894) – Brazil
- Janula bicornis (Thorell, 1881) (type) – Australia (Queensland)
- Janula bicruciata (Simon, 1895) – Brazil
- Janula bifrons (Thorell, 1895) – Myanmar
- Janula bizona Yoshida & Koh, 2011 – Borneo
- Janula bruneiensis Yoshida & Koh, 2011 – Borneo
- Janula bubalis Yoshida & Koh, 2011 – Borneo
- Janula chiapensis (Levi, 1955) – Mexico, Costa Rica (Cocos Is.)
- Janula colima (Levi, 1955) – Mexico to Panama
- Janula crysus (Buckup & Marques, 1992) – Brazil
- Janula cuzco (Levi, 1967) – Peru
- Janula dominica (Levi, 1955) – Hispaniola
- Janula erythrophthalma (Simon, 1894) – Panama, Lesser Antilles to Bolivia
- Janula flores E. N. L. Rodrigues, 2022 – Brazil
- Janula itaqui E. N. L. Rodrigues, 2022 – Brazil
- Janula jimmyi (Chavari & Brescovit, 2014) – Colombia
- Janula juarezi (Levi, 1955) – Mexico
- Janula luteolimbata (Thorell, 1898) – Myanmar
- Janula lutzenbergeri E. N. L. Rodrigues, 2022 – Brazil
- Janula malachina (Simon, 1895) – Peru, Brazil
- Janula mamiraua E. N. L. Rodrigues, 2022 – Brazil
- Janula manauara E. N. L. Rodrigues, 2022 – Brazil
- Janula marginata (Thorell, 1898) – Myanmar
- Janula modesta (Thorell, 1898) – Myanmar
- Janula moyobamba (Levi, 1964) – Peru
- Janula nadleri (Levi, 1955) – Bahama Is., Jamaica
- Janula nebulosa (Simon, 1895) – Panama, Bolivia, Brazil, Paraguay
- Janula ocreata (Simon, 1909) – Vietnam
- Janula panamensis (Levi, 1955) – Panama
- Janula parva (Wunderlich, 2008) – Malaysia
- Janula picta (Simon, 1895) – Singapore
- Janula pimenta E. N. L. Rodrigues, 2022 – Brazil
- Janula pyrus (Levi, 1964) – Panama
- Janula salobrensis (Simon, 1895) – Venezuela, Trinidad, Guyana, Brazil
- Janula seguro E. N. L. Rodrigues, 2022 – Brazil
- Janula taprobanica (Simon, 1895) – Sri Lanka
- Janula teresopolis (Levi, 1964) – Brazil
- Janula triangularis Yoshida & Koh, 2011 – Thailand, Singapore, Brunei (Borneo)
- Janula triocellata Yoshida & Koh, 2011 – Borneo
- Janula unitus (Levi, 1964) – Cuba, Jamaica
- Janula vaticus (Levi, 1964) – Costa Rica, Panama
- Janula zurlus (Levi, 1964) – Venezuela
