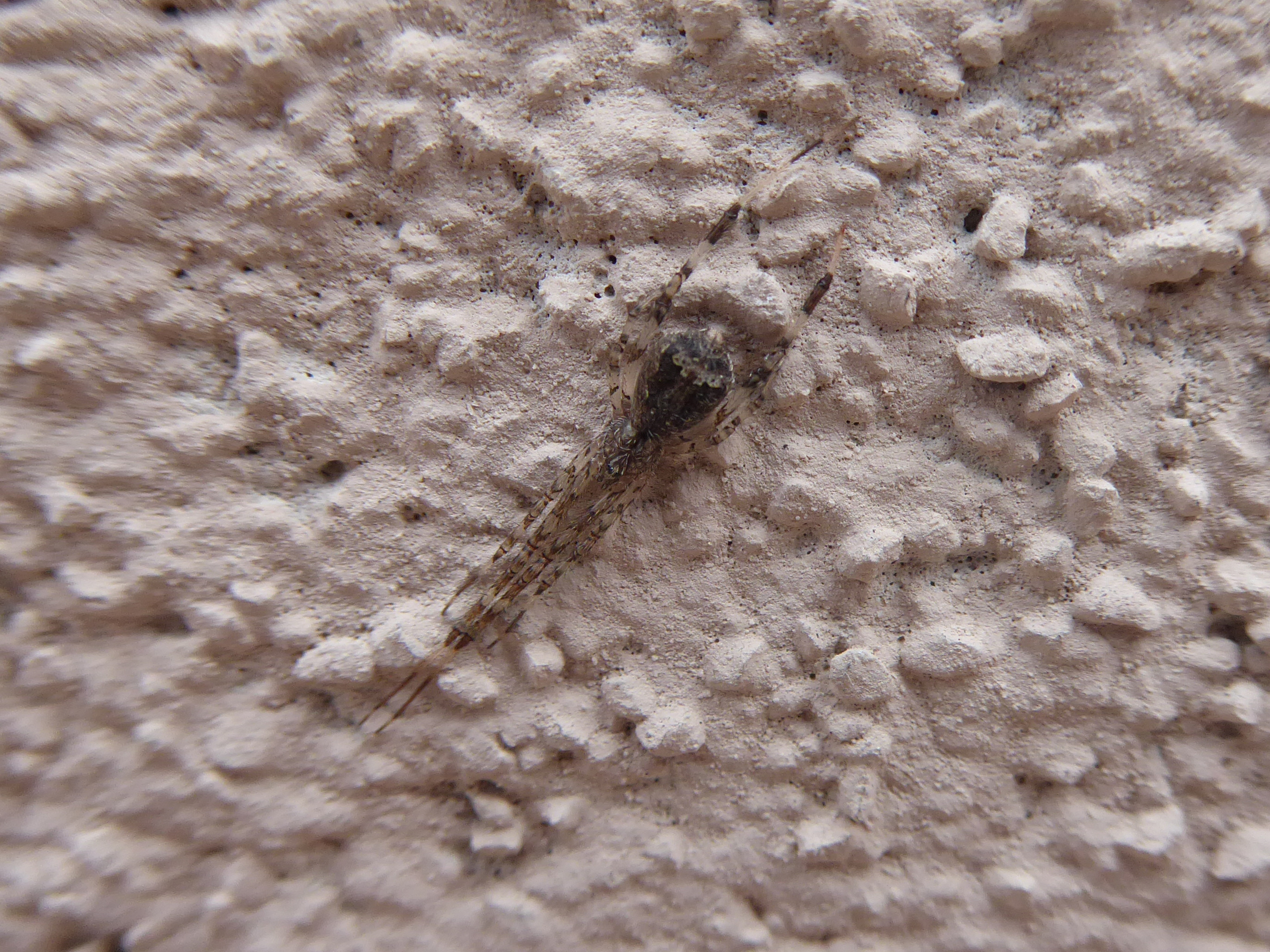

Scientific classification
- Domain: Eukaryota
- Kingdom: Animalia
- Phylum: Arthropoda
- Subphylum: Chelicerata
- Class: Arachnida
- Order: Araneae
- Infraorder: Araneomorphae
- Family: Theridiidae
- Genus: Episinus
- Species: E. maculipes

Binomial name
- Episinus maculipes Cavanna, 1876
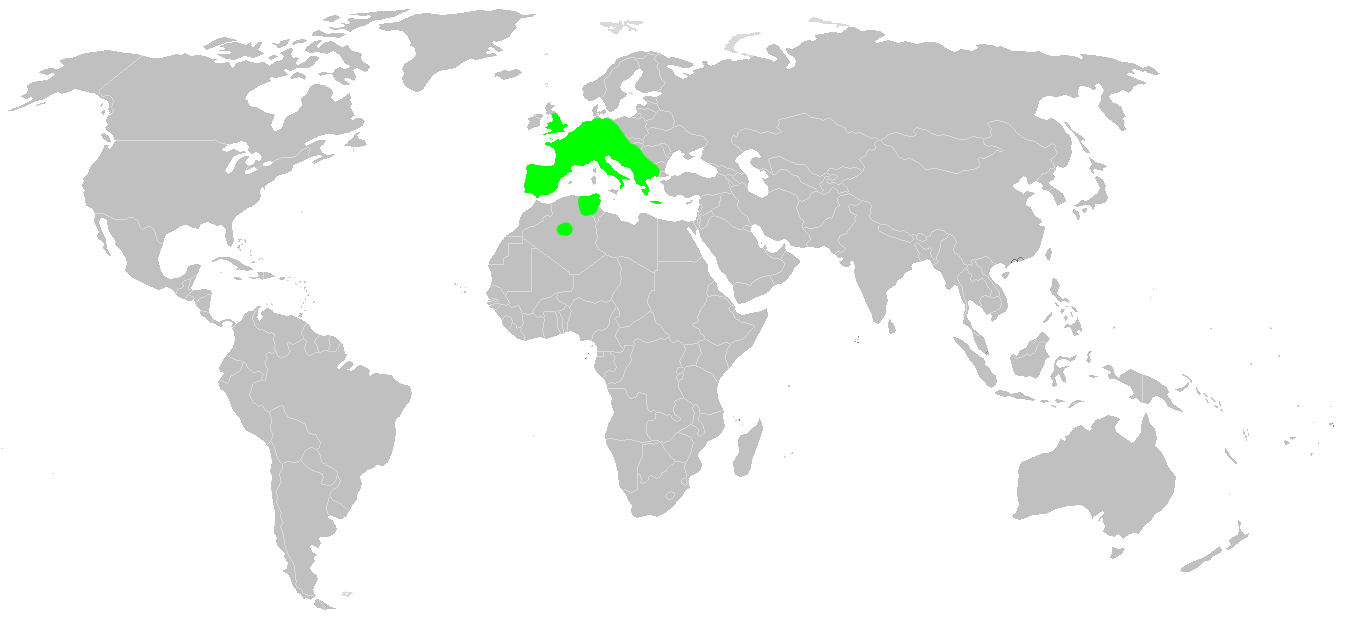
- Known distribution

= Episinus maculipes =

Species of spider

Episinus maculipes is a rare European spider of the family Theridiidae. The known distribution is "England to Algeria, Ukraine, Russia".

It is found on the foliage of shrubs and trees. At nightfall, it constructs a simple web, consisting of an inverted 'Y' frame with sticky globules. The frame could be anywhere from five to 20 cm. Almost half of female spiders were found to have caught prey (lacewing larvae and Phytocoris bugs (Capsidae)) within an hour of darkness. Males wander through the vegetation and do not build webs. Both sexes reach adulthood in July and August.
