= Spider taxonomy =

Science of naming, defining and classifying spiders

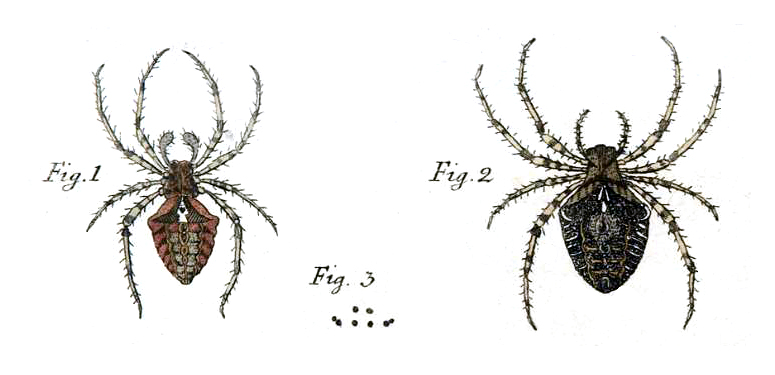
Paintings of Araneus angulatus from Svenska Spindlar of 1757, the first major work on spider taxonomy

Spider taxonomy is the part of taxonomy that is concerned with the science of naming, defining and classifying all spiders, members of the order Araneae of the arthropod class Arachnida, which has more than 53,000 described species. However, there are likely many species that have escaped the human eye as well as specimens stored in collections waiting to be described and classified. It is estimated that only one-third to one half of the total number of existing species have been described.

Arachnologists divide spiders into two suborders with about 139 families as of January 2026.

Due to constant research, with new species being discovered every month and others being recognized as synonyms, the number of species in the families is bound to change and only reflects the present state of knowledge. Nevertheless, the species numbers given here are useful as a guideline – see the table of families at the end of the article.

== History ==
Spider taxonomy can be traced to the work of Swedish naturalist Carl Alexander Clerck, who in 1757 published the first binomial scientific names of some 67 spiders species in his Svenska Spindlar ("Swedish Spiders"), one year before Linnaeus named over 30 spiders in his Systema Naturae. In the ensuing 250 years, thousands more species have been described by researchers around the world, yet only a dozen taxonomists are responsible for more than one-third of all species described. The most prolific authors include Eugène Simon of France, Norman Platnick and Herbert Walter Levi of the United States, Embrik Strand of Norway, and Tamerlan Thorell of Sweden, each having described well over 1,000 species.

== Overview of phylogeny ==
At the very top level, there is broad agreement on the phylogeny and hence classification of spiders, which is summarized in the cladogram below. The three main clades into which spiders are divided are shown in bold; as of 2015, they are usually treated as one suborder, Mesothelae, and two infraorders, Mygalomorphae and Araneomorphae, grouped into the suborder Opisthothelae. The Mesothelae, with about 196 species in 8 genera as of February 2025, make up a very small proportion of the total of around 53,680 known species. Mygalomorphae species comprise around 7% of the total, the remaining 92% being in the Araneomorphae. (Note: Species counts from World Spider Catalog (2026, Families), family classification from Coddington (2005, p. 20).)

- Araneae (spiders)
  - **Mesothelae**
  - - Opisthothelae
      - **Mygalomorphae**
      - - **Araneomorphae**
          - Austrochiloidea
          - Entelegynae
          - Haplogynae
          - Hypochiloidea

The Araneomorphae are divided into two main groups: the Haplogynae and the Entelegynae. The Haplogynae make up about 10% of the total number of spider species, the Entelegynae about 83%. The phylogenetic relationships of the Haplogynae, Entelegynae and the two smaller groups Hypochiloidea and Austrochiloidea remain uncertain as of 2015. Some analyses place both Hypochiloidea and Austrochiloidea outside Haplogynae; others place the Austrochiloidea between the Haplogynae and the Entelegynae; the Hypochiloidea have also been grouped with the Haplogynae. Earlier analyses regarded the Hypochiloidea as the sole representatives of a group called the Paleocribellatae, with all other araneomorphs placed in the Neocribellatae.

The Haplogynae are a group of araneomorph spiders with simpler male and female reproductive anatomy than the Entelegynae. Like the mesotheles and mygalomorphs, females have only a single genital opening (gonopore), used both for copulation and egg-laying; males have less complex palpal bulbs than those of the Entelegynae. Although some studies based on both morphology and DNA suggest that the Haplogynae form a monophyletic group (i.e. they comprise all the descendants of a common ancestor), this hypothesis has been described as "weakly supported", with most of the distinguishing features of the group being inherited from ancestors shared with other groups of spiders, rather than being clearly indicative of a separate common origin (i.e. being synapomorphies). One phylogenetic hypothesis based on molecular data shows the Haplogynae as a paraphyletic group leading to the Austrochilidae and Entelegynae.

The Entelegynae have a more complex reproductive anatomy: females have two "copulatory pores" in addition to the single genital pore of other groups of spiders; males have complex palpal bulbs, matching the female genital structures (epigynes). The monophyly of the group is well supported in both morphological and molecular studies. The internal phylogeny of the Entelegynae has been the subject of much research. Two groups within this clade contain the only spiders that make vertical orb webs: the Deinopoidea are cribellate – the adhesive properties of their webs are created by packets of thousands of extremely fine loops of dry silk; the Araneoidea are ecribellate – the adhesive properties of their webs are created by fine droplets of "glue". In spite of these differences, the webs of the two groups are similar in their overall geometry. The evolutionary history of the Entelegynae is thus intimately connected with the evolutionary history of orb webs. One hypothesis is that there is a single clade, Orbiculariae, uniting the orb web makers, in whose ancestors orb webs evolved. A review in 2014 concluded that there is strong evidence that orb webs evolved only once, although only weak support for the monophyly of the Orbiculariae. One possible phylogeny is shown below; the type of web made is shown for each terminal node in order of the frequency of occurrence.

- Entelegynae
  - Eresoidea, RTA clade – no web; substrate-defined web
  - Orbiculariae
    - Deinopoidea – orb web
    - - Araneoidea – orb web; aerial sheet web; cobweb; no web
      - Nicodamidae – aerial sheet web

If this is correct, the earliest members of the Entelegynae made webs defined by the substrate on which they were placed (e.g. the ground) rather than suspended orb webs. True orb webs evolved once, in the ancestors of the Orbiculariae, but were then modified or lost in some descendants.

An alternative hypothesis, supported by some molecular phylogenetic studies, is that the Orbiculariae are paraphyletic, with the phylogeny of the Entelegynae being as shown below.

- Entelegynae
  - Araneoidea – orb web; aerial sheet web; cobweb; no web
  - - Deinopoidea, Oecobiidae– orb web; substrate-defined web
    - RTA clade – no web; substrate-defined web

On this view, orb webs evolved earlier, being present in the early members of the Entelegynae, and were then lost in more groups, making web evolution more convoluted, with different kinds of web having evolved separately more than once. Future advances in technology, including comparative genomics studies, and whole-genome sampling should lead to "a clearer image of the evolutionary chronicle and the underlying diversity patterns that have resulted in one of the most extraordinary radiations of animals".

== Suborder Mesothelae ==
Mesothelae resemble the Solifugae ("wind scorpions" or "sun scorpions") in having segmented plates on their abdomens that create the appearance of the segmented abdomens of these other arachnids. They are both few in number and also limited in geographical range.

- †Arthrolycosidae (primitive spiders, extinct)
- †Arthromygalidae (primitive spiders, extinct)
- Liphistiidae (extant primitive burrowing spiders)
  - Subfamily Liphistiinae
  - Subfamily Heptathelinae

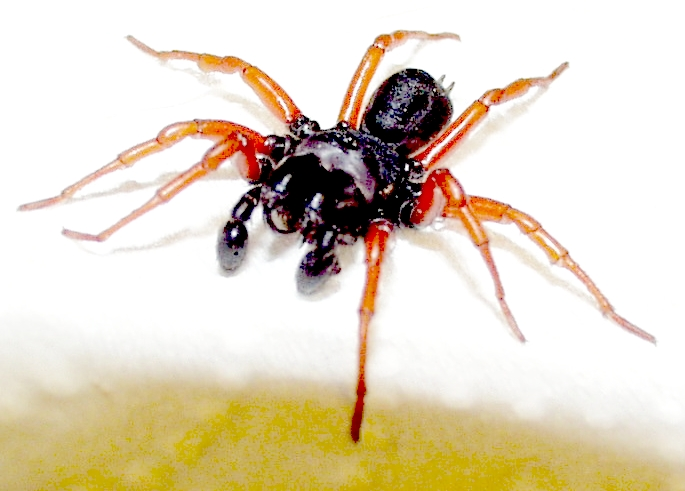
Digitally enhanced image of a Sphodros rufipes that shows the nearly perfectly vertical orientation of the fangs, a prime characteristic of the Mygalomorphae.

== Suborder Opisthothelae ==
Suborder Opisthothelae contains the spiders that have no plates on their abdomens. Opisthothelae is divided into two infraorders, Mygalomorphae and Araneomorphae, which can be distinguished by the orientation of their fangs. It can be somewhat difficult on casual inspection to determine whether the fang orientation would classify a spider as a mygalomorph or araneomorph. Spiders of the family theraphosidae, often called tarantulas, have such large fangs and chelicerae that an inspection of the fangs is hardly helpful in categorization into suborder mygalomorphae. Other, smaller, members of this suborder, however, look little different from the araneomorphs. (See the picture of Sphodros rufipes below.) Many araneomorphs are immediately identifiable as such since they are found on webs designed for the capture of prey or exhibit other habitat choices that eliminate the possibility that they could be mygalomorphs.

=== Infraorder Mygalomorphae ===
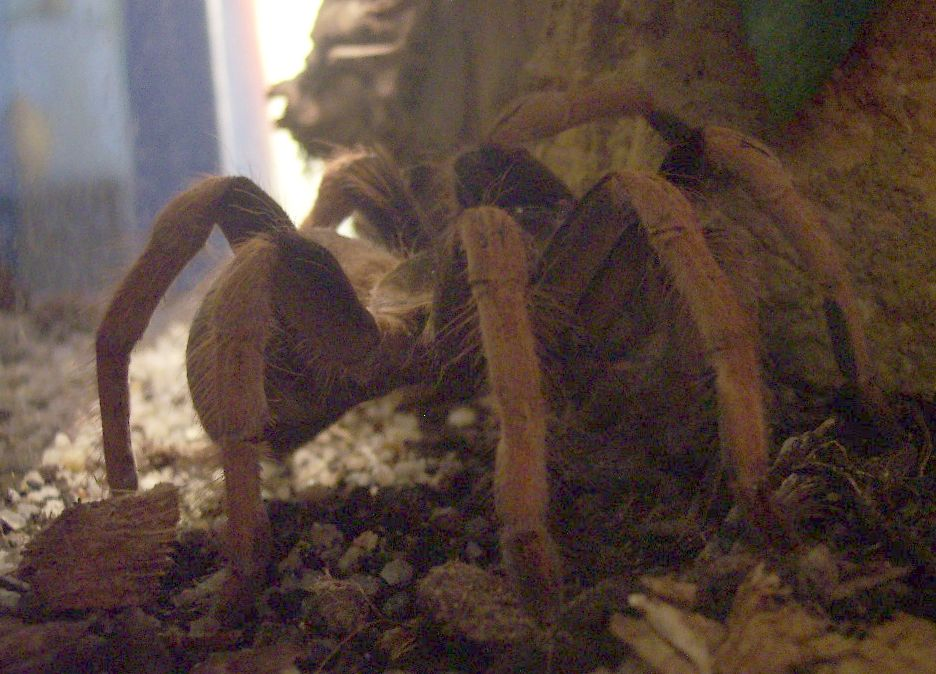
Megaphobema robustum, one of the many kinds of spiders called "tarantulas"

Spiders in infraorder Mygalomorphae are characterized by their downward striking fangs and possession of two pairs of book lungs.

=== Infraorder Araneomorphae ===
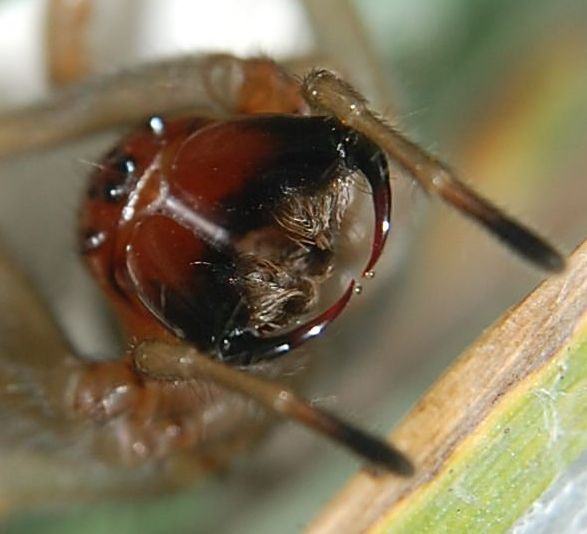
Photograph showing orientation of the fangs of the Araneomorphae.

Most, if not all, of the spiders one is likely to encounter in everyday life belong to infraorder Araneomorphae. It includes a wide range of spider families, including the orb-weaver spiders that weave their distinctive webs in gardens, the cobweb spiders that frequent window frames and the corners of rooms, the crab spiders that lurk on flowers waiting for nectar- and pollen-gathering insects, the jumping spiders that patrol the outside walls of buildings, and so on. They are characterized by having fangs whose tips approach each other as they bite, and (usually) having one pair of book lungs.

== Classification above families ==
Spiders were long classified into families that were then grouped into superfamilies, some of which were in turn placed into a number of higher taxa below the level of infraorder. When more rigorous approaches, such as cladistics, were applied to spider classification, it became clear that most of the major groupings used in the 20th century were not supported. Many were based on shared characteristics inherited from the ancestors of multiple clades (plesiomorphies), rather than being distinct characteristics originating in the ancestors of that clade only (apomorphies). According to Jonathan A. Coddington in 2005, "books and overviews published prior to the last two decades have been superseded". Listings of spiders, such as the World Spider Catalog, currently ignore classification above the family level.

At the higher level, the phylogeny of spiders is now often discussed using informal clade names, such as the "RTA clade", the "Oval Calmistrum" clade or the "Divided Cribellum" clade. Older names previously used formally are used as clade names, e.g. Entelegynae and Orbiculariae.

== Table of families ==
Key
Genera	1	≥2	≥10	≥100
Species	1–9	≥10	≥100	≥1000

Spider families (Note: Unless otherwise shown, currently accepted families and counts based on the World Spider Catalog version 26 as of 23 January 2026. In the World Spider Catalog, "species" counts may include subspecies. Assignment to sub- and infraorders based on Coddington (2005, p. 20) (when given there).)
Family	Genera	Species	Common name	Example
Mesothelae
Liphistiidae (including Heptathelidae)	8	194	segmented spiders	Kimura spider
Opisthothelae: Mygalomorphae
Actinopodidae	3	128		Missulena bradleyi (Eastern mouse spider)
Anamidae	10	235		Aname diversicolor (black wishbone spider)
Antrodiaetidae	4	37	folding trapdoor spiders	Atypoides riversi
Atracidae	3	39	Australian funnel-web spiders	Atrax robustus (Sydney funnel-web spider)
Atypidae	3	61	purseweb spiders	Sphodros rufipes (red-legged purseweb spider)
Barychelidae	39	293	brushed trapdoor spiders	Sason sundaicum
Bemmeridae	4	52		Spiroctenus personatus
Ctenizidae	2	6	cork-lid trapdoor spiders	Cteniza sauvagesi
Cyrtaucheniidae	6	109	wafer-lid trapdoor spiders	Ancylotrypa elongata
Dipluridae	8	155	curtain-web spiders	Diplura lineata
Entypesidae	7	41		Entypesa andohahela
Euagridae	14	87		Euagrus formosanus
Euctenizidae	8	79		Aptostichus simus
Halonoproctidae	6	150		Bothriocyrtum californicum (California trapdoor spider)
Hexathelidae	7	45	(Australian) funnel-web spiders	Hexathele hochstetteri
Hexurellidae	1	8		Hexurella pinea
Idiopidae	23	452	armored trapdoor spiders	Idiosoma nigrum (black rugose trapdoor spider)
Ischnothelidae	6	28		Ischnothele caudata
Macrothelidae	7	55		Macrothele calpeiana (Spanish funnel-web spider)
Mecicobothriidae	1	2	dwarf tarantulas or sheet funnel-web spiders	Mecicobothrium thorelli
Megahexuridae	1	1		Megahexura fulva
Melloinidae	1	5		
Microhexuridae	1	2		Microhexura montivaga (Spruce-fir moss spider)
Microstigmatidae	12	44		Envia garciai
Migidae	11	108	tree trapdoor spiders	Calathotarsus simoni
Nemesiidae	10	196		Aname atra (black wishbone spider)
Paratropididae	6	47	baldlegged spiders	Paratropis tuxtlensis
Porrhothelidae	1	5		Porrhothele antipodiana (black tunnelweb spider)
Pycnothelidae	15	144		Stanwellia hoggi
Rhytidicolidae	2	15		Fufius lucasae
Stasimopidae	1	56		Stasimopus mandelai
Theraphosidae	186	1194	tarantulas	Theraphosa blondi (Goliath birdeater)
Opisthothelae: Araneomorphae
Agelenidae	100	1481	araneomorph funnel-web spiders	Hobo spider (Eratigena agrestis)
Amaurobiidae	27	208	tangled nest spiders	Callobius claustrarius
Anapidae	59	233		Holarchaea novaeseelandiae
Ancylometidae	1	10		
Anyphaenidae	59	654	anyphaenid sac spiders	Hibana velox (yellow ghost spider)
Araneidae	197	3157	orb-weaver spiders	Zygiella x-notata
Archaeidae	6	93	pelican spiders	Madagascarchaea gracilicollis
Archoleptonetidae	2	8		Archoleptoneta gertschi
Argyronetidae	12	74		
Arkyidae	2	38		
Austrochilidae	2	9		Tasmanian cave spider (Hickmania troglodytes)
Caponiidae	21	157		Diploglena capensis
Cheiracanthiidae	15	385		Cheiracanthium mildei'
Cicurinidae	4	183		
Cithaeronidae	2	10		
Clubionidae	18	681	sac spiders	Clubiona trivialis
Corinnidae	76	892	dark sac spiders	Castianeira sp.
Ctenidae	48	606	wandering spiders	Phoneutria fera
Cyatholipidae	23	58		
Cybaeidae	24	308		Cryphoeca silvicola
Cycloctenidae	9	81		
Deinopidae	3	71	net-casting spiders	Asianopis subrufa (rufous net-casting spider)
Desidae	63	323	intertidal spiders	Phryganoporus candidus
Dictynidae	45	339		Nigma walckenaeri
Diguetidae	2	16	coneweb spiders	
Dolomedidae	7	128		
Drymusidae	2	19	false violin spiders	
Dysderidae	24	666	woodlouse hunter spiders	Woodlouse spider (Dysdera crocata)
Eresidae	9	120	velvet spiders	Eresus sandaliatus
Filistatidae	18	192	crevice weavers	Southern house spider (Kukulcania hibernalis)
Fonteferreidae	1	1		
Gallieniellidae	5	41		
Gnaphosidae	154	2498	flat-bellied ground spiders	Drassodes cupreus
Gradungulidae	8	20	large-clawed spiders	Progradungula carraiensis (Carrai cave spider)
Hahniidae	29	244	dwarf sheet spiders	
Hersiliidae	16	189	tree trunk spiders	Hersilia savignyi
Homalonychidae	1	2		
Huttoniidae	1	1		Huttonia palpimanoides
Hypochilidae	2	33	lampshade spiders	Hypochilus thorelli
Lamponidae	23	192		White-tailed spider (Lampona spp.)
Lathyidae	10	58		
Leptonetidae	22	400		Tooth Cave spider (Tayshaneta myopica)
Linyphiidae	640	4965	dwarf / money spiders	Linyphia triangularis
Liocranidae	35	358	liocranid sac spiders	
Lycosidae	140	2510	wolf spiders	Lycosa tarantula
Macrobunidae	27	95		
Malkaridae	13	57	shield spiders	
Mecysmaucheniidae	7	25		
Megadictynidae	2	2		
Mimetidae	8	166	pirate spiders	Ero aphana
Miturgidae	33	191	long-legged sac spiders	
Myrmecicultoridae	1	2		
Mysmenidae	17	188	spurred orb-weavers	
Nesticidae	16	291	cave cobweb spiders	Nesticella marapu
Nicodamidae	7	27		
Ochyroceratidae	9	184	midget ground weavers	Theotima minutissima
Oecobiidae	7	134	disc web spiders	Oecobius navus
Oonopidae	115	1983	dwarf hunting spiders	Oonops domesticus
Orsolobidae	30	190		
Oxyopidae	10	448	lynx spiders	Peucetia viridans (green lynx spider)
Pacullidae	4	38		
Palpimanidae	20	182	palp-footed spiders	
Penestomidae	1	9		
Periegopidae	1	3		
Philodromidae	31	529	philodromid crab spiders	Philodromus dispar
Pholcidae	97	2060	daddy long-legs spiders	Pholcus phalangioides
Phrurolithidae	27	420		
Physoglenidae	13	72		
Phyxelididae	14	68		
Pimoidae	2	87		Pimoa cthulhu
Pisauridae	45	235	nursery web spiders	Pisaura mirabilis
Plectreuridae	2	32		
Prodidomidae	24	196		
Psechridae	2	64		
Psilodercidae	11	225		
Salticidae	695	6950	jumping spiders	Zebra spider (Salticus scenicus)
Scytodidae	4	262	spitting spiders	Scytodes thoracica
Segestriidae	5	181	tubeweb spiders	Segestria florentina
Selenopidae	9	282	wall spiders	Selenops radiatus
Senoculidae	1	31		
Sicariidae	3	177	recluse spiders	Brown recluse (Loxosceles reclusa)
Sparassidae	99	1551	huntsman spiders	Delena cancerides (Avondale spider)
Stenochilidae	2	13		
Stiphidiidae	20	125		Tartarus mullamullangensis
Symphytognathidae	10	108	dwarf orb-weavers	Patu digua
Synaphridae	3	13		
Synotaxidae	5	40		
Telemidae	16	113	long-legged cave spiders	
Tetrablemmidae	27	153	armored spiders	
Tetragnathidae	45	996	long jawed orb-weavers	Leucauge venusta (orchard spider)
Theridiidae	138	2619	cobweb spiders	Redback spider (Latrodectus hasselti)
Theridiosomatidae	24	180	ray spiders	Theridiosoma gemmosum
Thomisidae	172	2194	crab spiders	Misumena vatia (goldenrod crab spider)
Titanoecidae	5	67		Goeldia obscura
Toxopidae	14	82		
Trachelidae	29	317		
Trachycosmidae	20	148		
Trechaleidae	18	136		
Trochanteriidae	6	51		
Trogloraptoridae	1	1		Trogloraptor marchingtoni
Udubidae	6	58		
Uloboridae	20	284	hackled orb-weavers	Uloborus walckenaerius
Viridasiidae	3	14		
Xenoctenidae	4	33		
Zodariidae	90	1325		Zodarion germanicum
Zoropsidae	28	186		Zoropsis spinimana

== Bibliography ==
- Agnarsson, Ingi; Coddington, Jonathan A. & Kuntner, Matjaž (2013). "Systematics : Progress in the study of spider diversity and evolution". In Penney, David (ed.). Spider research in the 21st century: trends & perspectives. Manchester, UK: Siri Scientific Press. ISBN 978-0-9574530-1-2.
- Blackledge, Todd A.; Scharff, Nikolaj; Coddington, Jonathan A.; Szüts, Tamas; Wenzel, John W.; Hayashi, Cheryl Y. & Agnarsson, Ingi (2009). "Reconstructing web evolution and spider diversification in the molecular era". Proceedings of the National Academy of Sciences. 106 (13): 5229–5234. Bibcode:2009PNAS..106.5229B. doi:10.1073/pnas.0901377106. PMC 2656561. PMID 19289848.
- Bond, Jason E.; Garrison, Nicole L.; Hamilton, Chris A.; Godwin, Rebecca L.; Hedin, Marshal & Agnarsson, Ingi (2014). "Phylogenomics Resolves a Spider Backbone Phylogeny and Rejects a Prevailing Paradigm for Orb Web Evolution". Current Biology. 24 (15): 1765–1771. Bibcode:2014CBio...24.1765B. doi:10.1016/j.cub.2014.06.034. PMID 25042592.
- Coddington, Jonathan A. (2005). "Phylogeny and classification of spiders" (PDF). In Ubick, D.; Paquin, P.; Cushing, P.E. & Roth, V. (eds.). Spiders of North America: an identification manual. American Arachnological Society. pp. 18–24.
- Coddington, Jonathan A. & Levi, Herbert W. (1991). "Systematics and evolution of spiders (Araneae)". Annual Review of Ecology and Systematics. 22: 565–592. Bibcode:1991AnRES..22..565C. doi:10.1146/annurev.es.22.110191.003025. JSTOR 2097274.
- Dimitrov, Dimitar & Hormiga, Gustavo (7 January 2021). "Spider Diversification Through Space and Time". Annual Review of Entomology. 66 (1): 225–241. doi:10.1146/annurev-ento-061520-083414. ISSN 0066-4170. PMID 32822555. S2CID 221235817.
- Eberhard, W.G. & Huber, B.A. (2010). "Spider genitalia: precise manoeuvers with a numb structure in a complex lock" (PDF). In Leonard, Janet L. & Córdoba-Aguilar, Alex (eds.). The evolution of primary sexual characters in animals. Oxford University Press. ISBN 978-0-19-971703-3.
- Griswold, C.E.; Ramirez, M.J.; Coddington, J.A. & Platnick, N.I. (2005). "Atlas of phylogenetic data for entelegyne spiders (Araneae: Araneomorphae: Entelegynae) with comments on their phylogeny" (PDF). Proceedings of the California Academy of Sciences. 56 (Suppl. 2): 1–324.
- Hormiga, Gustavo & Griswold, Charles E. (2014). "Systematics, Phylogeny, and Evolution of Orb-Weaving Spiders". Annual Review of Entomology. 59 (1): 487–512. doi:10.1146/annurev-ento-011613-162046. PMID 24160416.
- Michalik, Peter & Ramírez, Martín J. (2014). "Evolutionary morphology of the male reproductive system, spermatozoa and seminal fluid of spiders (Araneae, Arachnida)–Current knowledge and future directions". Arthropod Structure & Development. 43 (4): 291–322. Bibcode:2014ArtSD..43..291M. doi:10.1016/j.asd.2014.05.005. hdl:11336/19081. PMID 24907603.
- Platnick, Norman I. & Raven, Robert J. (2013). "Spider Systematics: Past and Future". Zootaxa. 3683 (5): 595–600. doi:10.11646/zootaxa.3683.5.8. PMID 25250473.
- Ramírez, Martín J. (2014). The morphology and phylogeny of dionychan spiders (Araneae, Araneomorphae). Bulletin of the American Museum of Natural History. Vol. 390. hdl:2246/6537.
- World Spider Catalog (2026). "World Spider Catalog version 26". Natural History Museum Bern.
