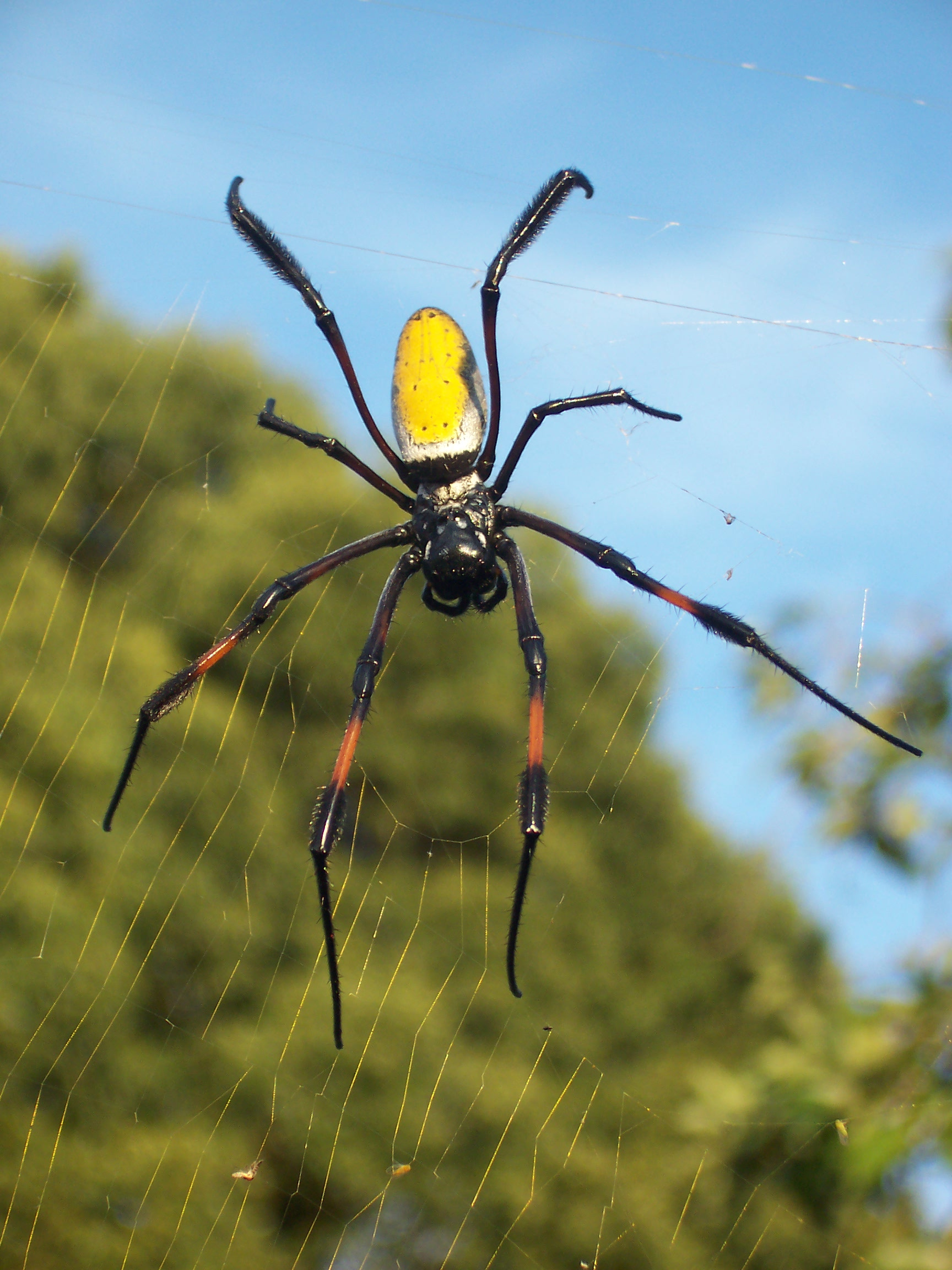
- Nephila inaurata (Nephilidae)
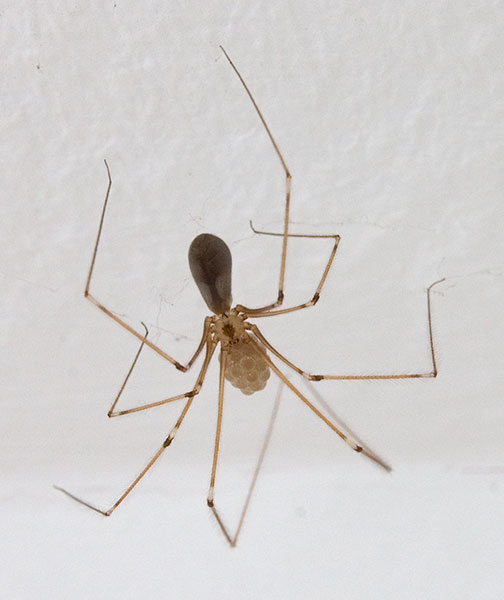
- Pholcus phalangioides female with eggsac (Pholcidae)

Scientific classification
- Kingdom: Animalia
- Phylum: Arthropoda
- Subphylum: Chelicerata
- Class: Arachnida
- Order: Araneae
- Suborder: Opisthothelae
- Infraorder: Araneomorphae

Subdivisions
- Filistatidae; Hypochilidae; Synspermiata (17 families); Leptonetidae; Austrochiloidea (2 families); Palpimanoidea (5 families); Entelegynae (68 families)

Diversity
- 95 families

= Araneomorphae =

Araneomorph spiders Temporal range: Triassic–present

Infraorder of arachnids

The Araneomorphae (also called the Labidognatha or "true spiders") are an infraorder of spiders. They are distinguishable by chelicerae (fangs) that point diagonally forward and cross in a pinching action, in contrast to those of Mygalomorphae (tarantulas and their close kin), which point straight down. Araneomorphs comprise the vast majority (about 92%) of living spiders.

== Distinguishing characteristics ==
Most spider species are Araneomorphae, which have fangs that face towards each other, increasing the orientations that they can employ during prey-capture. They have fewer book lungs (when present) – usually one pair – and the females typically live one year.

The Mygalomorphae have fangs that face towards the ground, and which are parallel to the long axis of the spider's body, thus they have only one orientation they can employ during prey capture. They have two pairs of book lungs, and the females often live many years.

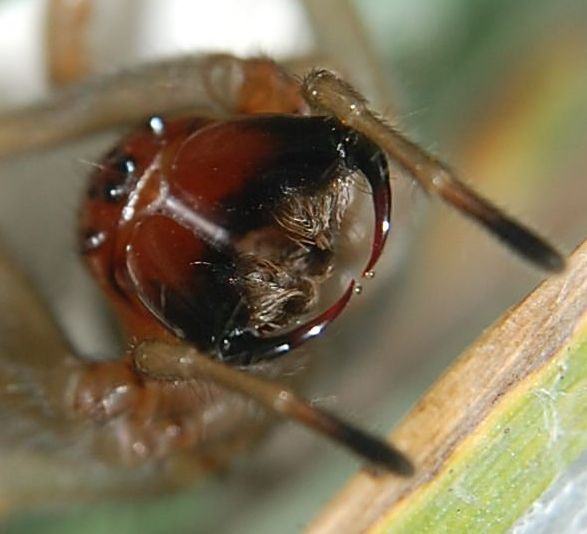
This Cheiracanthium punctorium shows the orientation of Araneomorphae fangs.

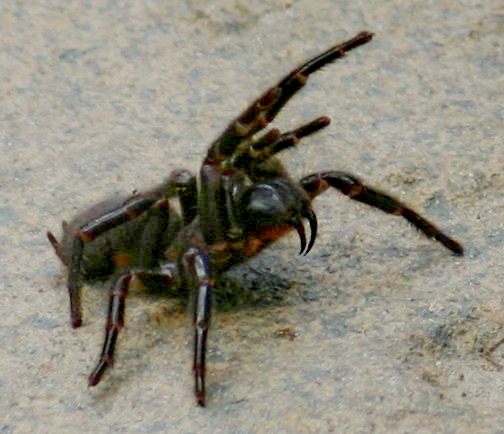
This Atrax robustus shows the orientation of Mygalomorphae fangs.

== Spiders included ==
Almost all of the familiar spiders are included in the Araneomorphae group, one major exception being the tarantulas. There are a few other Mygalomorphae species that live around homes or gardens, but they typically are relatively small and not easily noticed.

The Araneomorphae, to the contrary, include the weavers of spiral webs; the cobweb spiders that live in the corners of rooms, and between windows and screens; the crab spiders that lurk on the surfaces of flowers in gardens; the jumping spiders that are visible hunting on surfaces; the wolf spiders that carpet hunting sites in sunny spots; and the large huntsman spiders.

== Systematics ==
In older schemes, the Araneomorphae were divided into two lineages, the Hypochilae (containing only the family Hypochilidae), and the Neocribellatae. The Neocribellatae were in turn divided into the Austrochiloidea, and the two series Haplogynae and Entelogynae, each containing several superfamilies. Molecular phylogenetic studies have shown that the haplogynes in particular are not a monophyletic group. A 2020 study suggested the relationships among the major groups were as shown in the following cladogram.

- Araneomorphae
  - - - Hypochilidae
      - Filistatidae
    - Synspermiata
  - - - Leptonetidae
      - Austrochiloidea
    - - Palpimanoidea
      - Entelegynae

The blue bar to the right shows the former Haplogynae in the sense of Coddington (2005).

== Table of families ==
Key
| Genera | 1 | ≥2 | ≥10 | ≥100 |
| Species | 1–9 | ≥10 | ≥100 | ≥1000 |

Spider families (Note: Unless otherwise shown, currently accepted families and counts based on the World Spider Catalog version 26 as of 23 January 2026. In the World Spider Catalog, "species" counts may include subspecies. Assignment to sub- and infraorders based on Coddington (2005, p. 20) (when given there).)
| Family | Genera | Species | Common name | Example |
|---|---|---|---|---|
| Agelenidae | 100 | 1481 | araneomorph funnel-web spiders | Hobo spider (Eratigena agrestis) |
| Amaurobiidae | 27 | 208 | tangled nest spiders | Callobius claustrarius |
| Anapidae | 59 | 233 | | Holarchaea novaeseelandiae |
| Ancylometidae | 1 | 10 | | |
| Anyphaenidae | 59 | 654 | anyphaenid sac spiders | Hibana velox (yellow ghost spider) |
| Araneidae | 197 | 3157 | orb-weaver spiders | Zygiella x-notata |
| Archaeidae | 6 | 93 | pelican spiders | Madagascarchaea gracilicollis |
| Archoleptonetidae | 2 | 8 | | Archoleptoneta gertschi |
| Argyronetidae | 12 | 74 | | |
| Arkyidae | 2 | 38 | | |
| Austrochilidae | 2 | 9 | | Tasmanian cave spider (Hickmania troglodytes) |
| Caponiidae | 21 | 157 | | Diploglena capensis |
| Cheiracanthiidae | 15 | 385 | | Cheiracanthium mildei' |
| Cicurinidae | 4 | 183 | | |
| Cithaeronidae | 2 | 10 | | |
| Clubionidae | 18 | 681 | sac spiders | Clubiona trivialis |
| Corinnidae | 76 | 892 | dark sac spiders | Castianeira sp. |
| Ctenidae | 48 | 606 | wandering spiders | Phoneutria fera |
| Cyatholipidae | 23 | 58 | | |
| Cybaeidae | 24 | 308 | | Cryphoeca silvicola |
| Cycloctenidae | 9 | 81 | | |
| Deinopidae | 3 | 71 | net-casting spiders | Asianopis subrufa (rufous net-casting spider) |
| Desidae | 63 | 323 | intertidal spiders | Phryganoporus candidus |
| Dictynidae | 45 | 339 | | Nigma walckenaeri |
| Diguetidae | 2 | 16 | coneweb spiders | |
| Dolomedidae | 7 | 128 | | |
| Drymusidae | 2 | 19 | false violin spiders | |
| Dysderidae | 24 | 666 | woodlouse hunter spiders | Woodlouse spider (Dysdera crocata) |
| Eresidae | 9 | 120 | velvet spiders | Eresus sandaliatus |
| Filistatidae | 18 | 192 | crevice weavers | Southern house spider (Kukulcania hibernalis) |
| Fonteferreidae | 1 | 1 | | |
| Gallieniellidae | 5 | 41 | | |
| Gnaphosidae | 154 | 2498 | flat-bellied ground spiders | Drassodes cupreus |
| Gradungulidae | 8 | 20 | large-clawed spiders | Progradungula carraiensis (Carrai cave spider) |
| Hahniidae | 29 | 244 | dwarf sheet spiders | |
| Hersiliidae | 16 | 189 | tree trunk spiders | Hersilia savignyi |
| Homalonychidae | 1 | 2 | | |
| Huttoniidae | 1 | 1 | | Huttonia palpimanoides |
| Hypochilidae | 2 | 33 | lampshade spiders | Hypochilus thorelli |
| Lamponidae | 23 | 192 | | White-tailed spider (Lampona spp.) |
| Lathyidae | 10 | 58 | | |
| Leptonetidae | 22 | 400 | | Tooth Cave spider (Tayshaneta myopica) |
| Linyphiidae | 640 | 4965 | dwarf / money spiders | Linyphia triangularis |
| Liocranidae | 35 | 358 | liocranid sac spiders | |
| Lycosidae | 140 | 2510 | wolf spiders | Lycosa tarantula |
| Macrobunidae | 27 | 95 | | |
| Malkaridae | 13 | 57 | shield spiders | |
| Mecysmaucheniidae | 7 | 25 | | |
| Megadictynidae | 2 | 2 | | |
| Mimetidae | 8 | 166 | pirate spiders | Ero aphana |
| Miturgidae | 33 | 191 | long-legged sac spiders | |
| Myrmecicultoridae | 1 | 2 | | |
| Mysmenidae | 17 | 188 | spurred orb-weavers | |
| Nesticidae | 16 | 291 | cave cobweb spiders | Nesticella marapu |
| Nicodamidae | 7 | 27 | | |
| Ochyroceratidae | 9 | 184 | midget ground weavers | Theotima minutissima |
| Oecobiidae | 7 | 134 | disc web spiders | Oecobius navus |
| Oonopidae | 115 | 1983 | dwarf hunting spiders | Oonops domesticus |
| Orsolobidae | 30 | 190 | | |
| Oxyopidae | 10 | 448 | lynx spiders | Peucetia viridans (green lynx spider) |
| Pacullidae | 4 | 38 | | |
| Palpimanidae | 20 | 182 | palp-footed spiders | |
| Penestomidae | 1 | 9 | | |
| Periegopidae | 1 | 3 | | |
| Philodromidae | 31 | 529 | philodromid crab spiders | Philodromus dispar |
| Pholcidae | 97 | 2060 | daddy long-legs spiders | Pholcus phalangioides |
| Phrurolithidae | 27 | 420 | | |
| Physoglenidae | 13 | 72 | | |
| Phyxelididae | 14 | 68 | | |
| Pimoidae | 2 | 87 | | Pimoa cthulhu |
| Pisauridae | 45 | 235 | nursery web spiders | Pisaura mirabilis |
| Plectreuridae | 2 | 32 | | |
| Prodidomidae | 24 | 196 | | |
| Psechridae | 2 | 64 | | |
| Psilodercidae | 11 | 225 | | |
| Salticidae | 695 | 6950 | jumping spiders | Zebra spider (Salticus scenicus) |
| Scytodidae | 4 | 262 | spitting spiders | Scytodes thoracica |
| Segestriidae | 5 | 181 | tubeweb spiders | Segestria florentina |
| Selenopidae | 9 | 282 | wall spiders | Selenops radiatus |
| Senoculidae | 1 | 31 | | |
| Sicariidae | 3 | 177 | recluse spiders | Brown recluse (Loxosceles reclusa) |
| Sparassidae | 99 | 1551 | huntsman spiders | Delena cancerides (Avondale spider) |
| Stenochilidae | 2 | 13 | | |
| Stiphidiidae | 20 | 125 | | Tartarus mullamullangensis |
| Symphytognathidae | 10 | 108 | dwarf orb-weavers | Patu digua |
| Synaphridae | 3 | 13 | | |
| Synotaxidae | 5 | 40 | | |
| Telemidae | 16 | 113 | long-legged cave spiders | |
| Tetrablemmidae | 27 | 153 | armored spiders | |
| Tetragnathidae | 45 | 996 | long jawed orb-weavers | Leucauge venusta (orchard spider) |
| Theridiidae | 138 | 2619 | cobweb spiders | Redback spider (Latrodectus hasselti) |
| Theridiosomatidae | 24 | 180 | ray spiders | Theridiosoma gemmosum |
| Thomisidae | 172 | 2194 | crab spiders | Misumena vatia (goldenrod crab spider) |
| Titanoecidae | 5 | 67 | | Goeldia obscura |
| Toxopidae | 14 | 82 | | |
| Trachelidae | 29 | 317 | | |
| Trachycosmidae | 20 | 148 | | |
| Trechaleidae | 18 | 136 | | |
| Trochanteriidae | 6 | 51 | | |
| Trogloraptoridae | 1 | 1 | | Trogloraptor marchingtoni |
| Udubidae | 6 | 58 | | |
| Uloboridae | 20 | 284 | hackled orb-weavers | Uloborus walckenaerius |
| Viridasiidae | 3 | 14 | | |
| Xenoctenidae | 4 | 33 | | |
| Zodariidae | 90 | 1325 | | Zodarion germanicum |
| Zoropsidae | 28 | 186 | | Zoropsis spinimana |

=== Extinct families ===
- Pholcochyroceridae
- Mongolarachnidae
