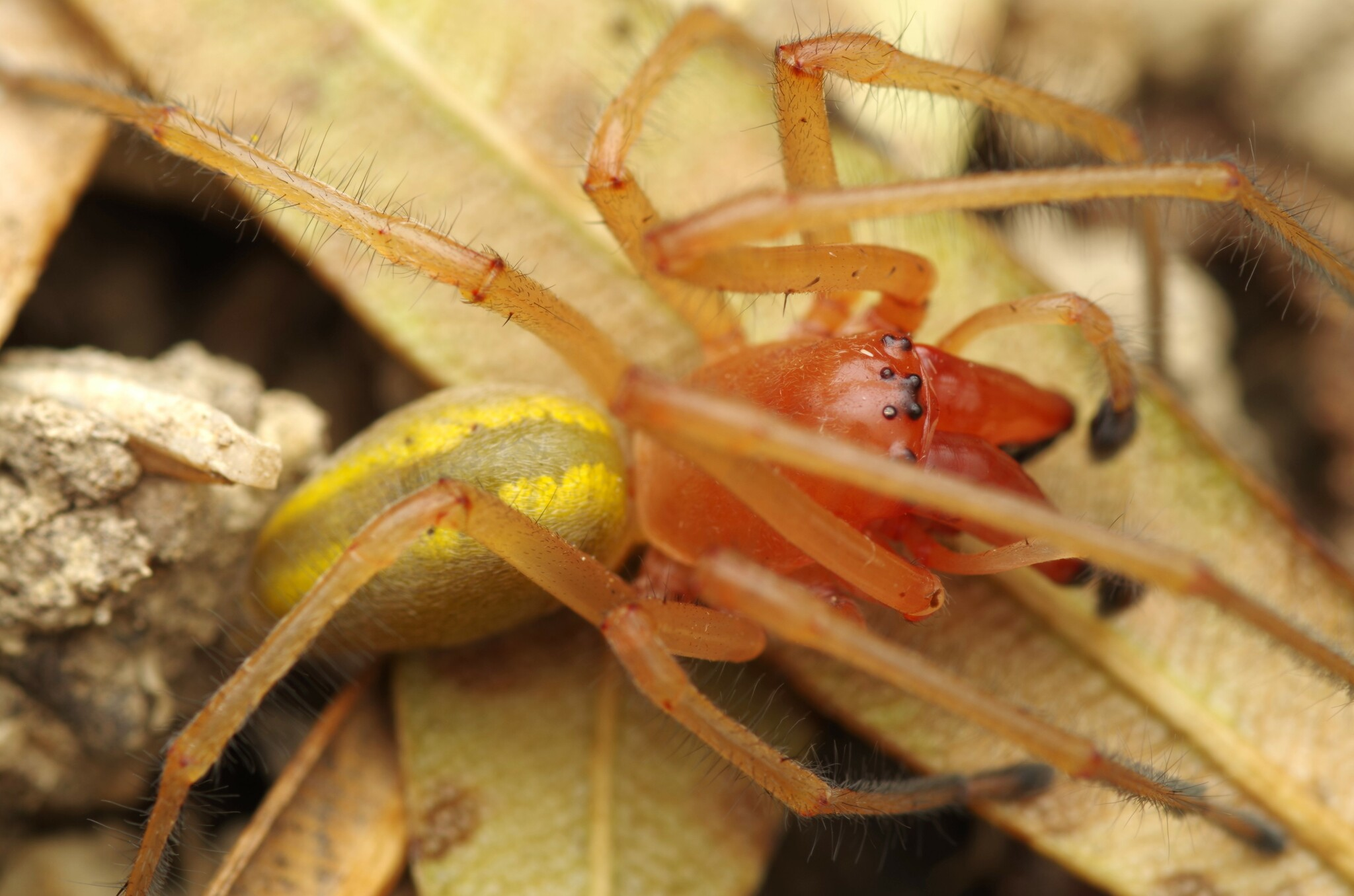

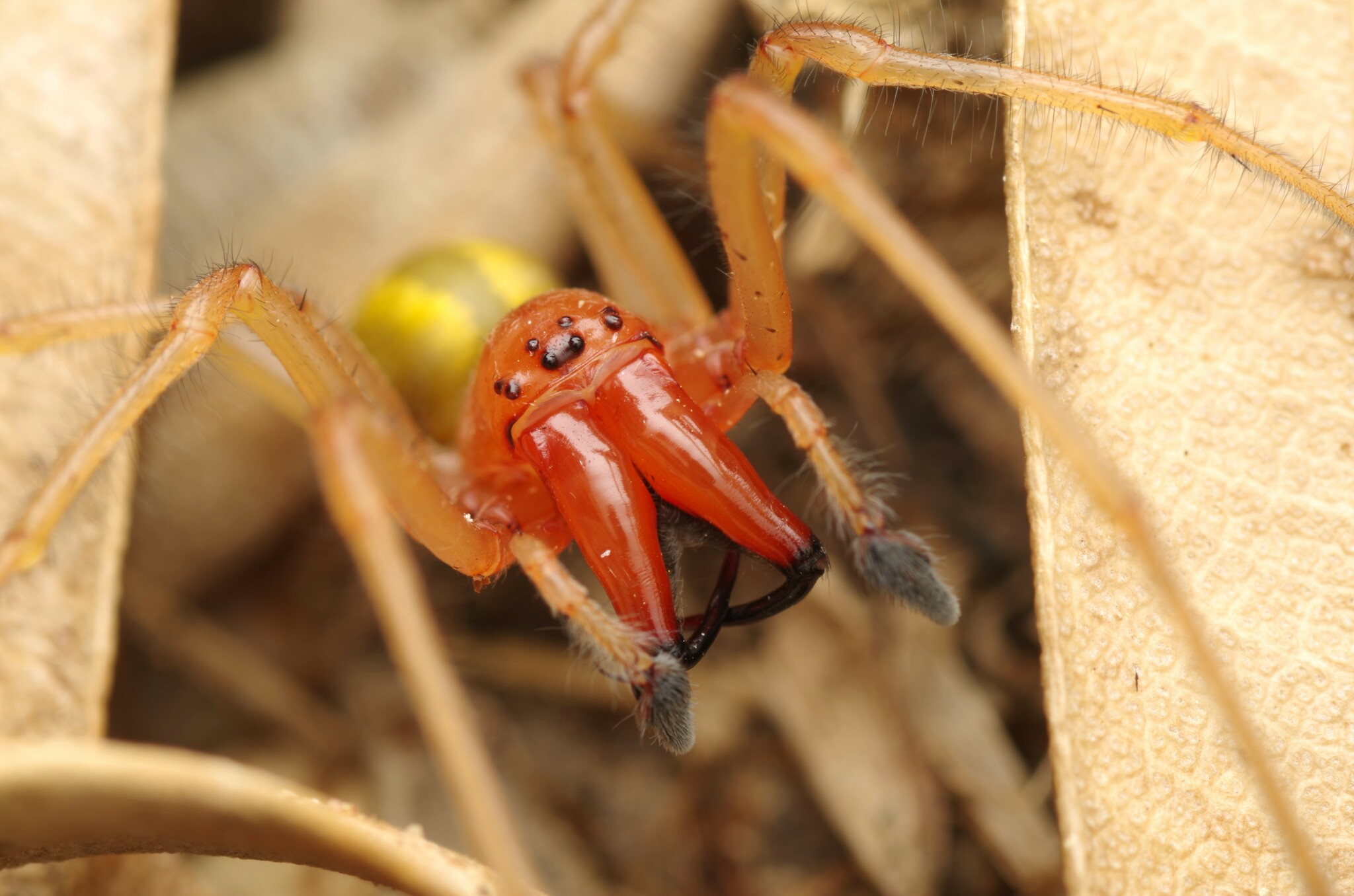

Scientific classification
- Kingdom: Animalia
- Phylum: Arthropoda
- Subphylum: Chelicerata
- Class: Arachnida
- Order: Araneae
- Infraorder: Araneomorphae
- Family: Cheiracanthiidae
- Genus: Cheiracanthium
- Species: C. punctorium

Binomial name
- Cheiracanthium punctorium (Villers, 1789)

= Cheiracanthium punctorium =

Yellow Sac Spider

Yellow sack spider

Cheiracanthium punctorium, one of several species commonly known as the yellow sac spider, is a spider found from central Europe to Central Asia. They reach a length of about 15 mm, and their bite can penetrate human skin; the bite has been compared to a wasp sting, perhaps a bit more severe, although susceptible persons can have stronger reactions, like nausea.

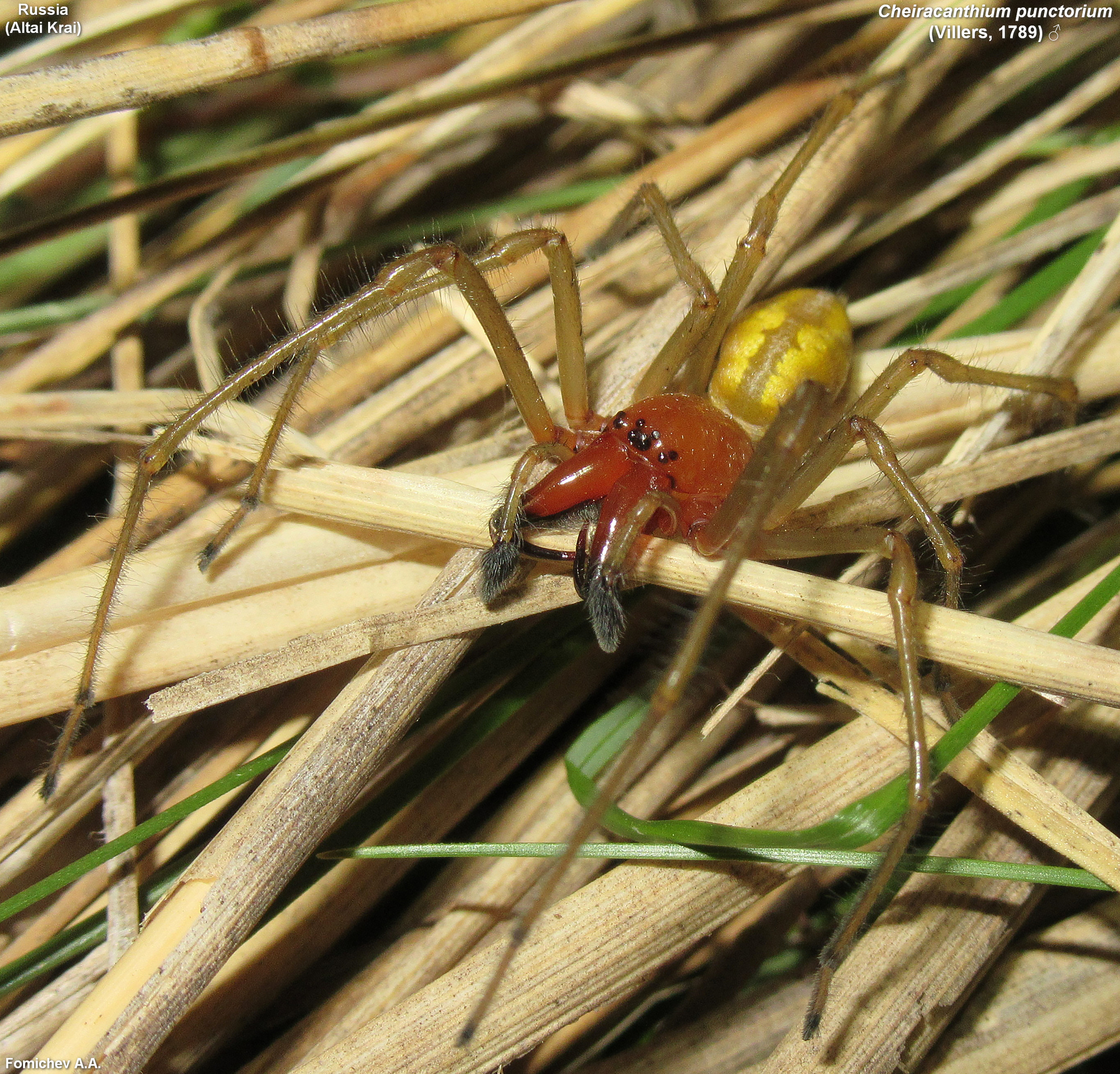
In Ust'yanka Village, Altai Krai, Russia, in 2025

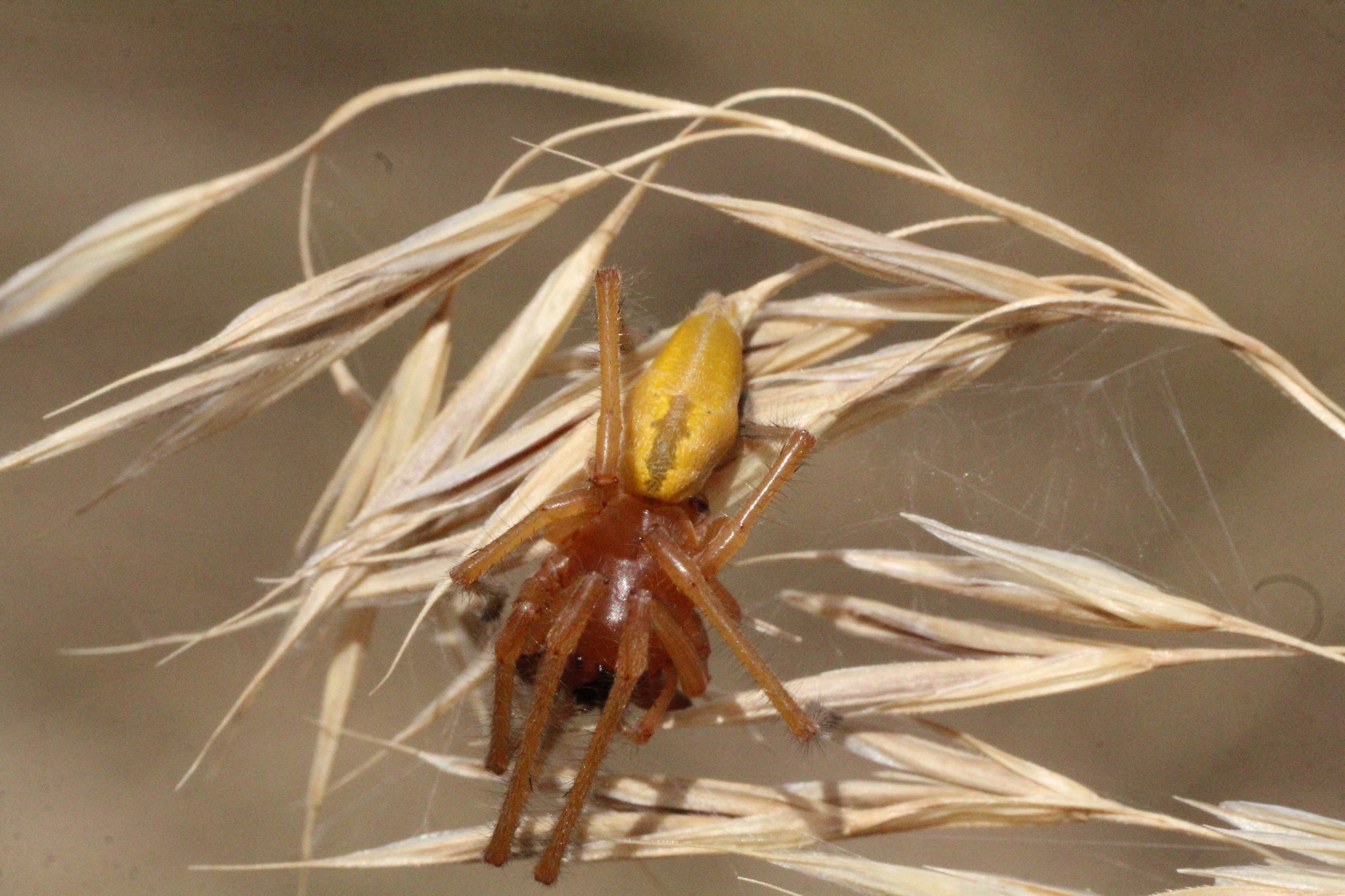
In Payra-sur-l'Hers, France, in 2025

== Lifestyle ==
=== Reproduction ===
The mating season for Cheiracanthium punctorium begins in early summer, when males deliberately seek out desired females. Both genders possess the ability to reproduce and mate numerous times.

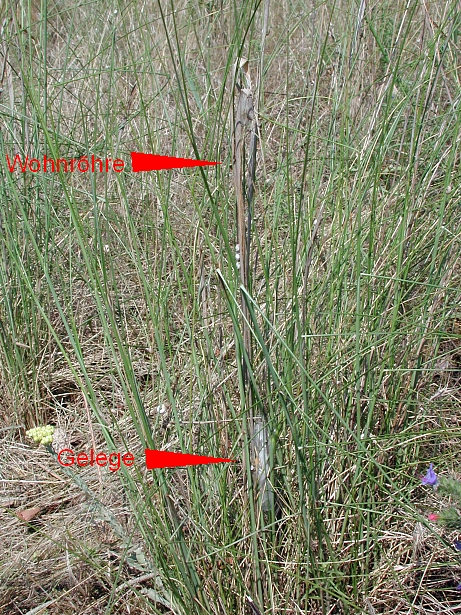
Egg sacs in Germany

About 14 days after mating, females produce egg sacs of about 4 cm in high grass. The sac opens from the bottom and is aggressively defended for approximately 17 days after the young are born.

Once mature, spiderlings are emancipated from their nests. Relying not on the power of the wind but on static electricity, the juveniles deploy silk 'balloons' and venture off to begin adult life.

== Venom ==
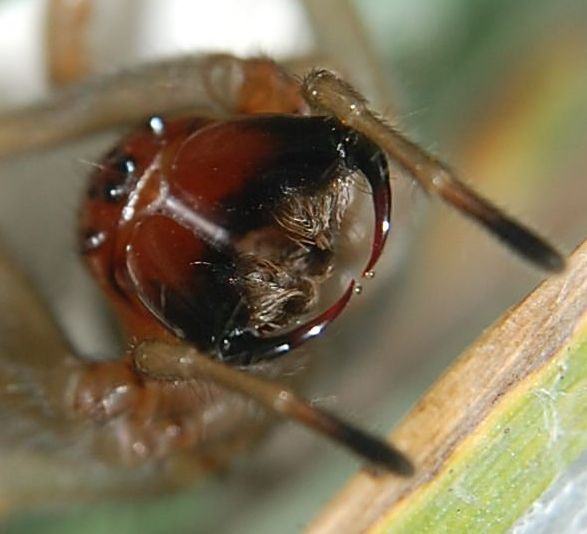
Female with drops of venom on its fangs

Although its bite is harmless, it is considered the only "seriously" venomous spider in Germany, where it is a rare species, occurring chiefly in the southern half. Notable numbers are found in the Kaiserstuhl region, the hottest part of the country.

== Distribution ==
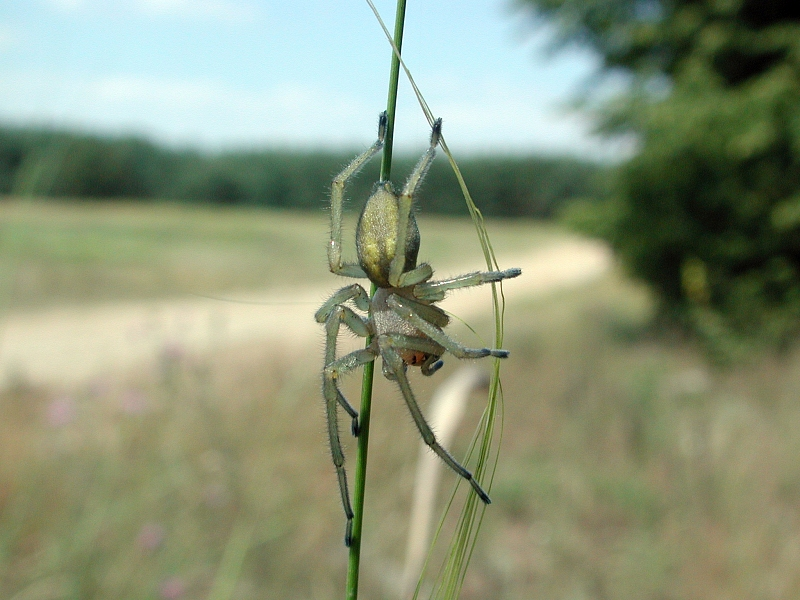
In Germany

The species is native over a wide area of Eurasia, from Europe through Turkey, the Caucasus and Iran to Central Asia and southern Siberia. There is evidence that the species is spreading in northeastern Germany, e.g. Brandenburg. The main reason is an increase in fallow, uncultivated land in these areas, though changing weather patterns leading to increased aridity and less precipitation may also play a role. C. punctorium is most numerous in the steppes of Central Asia.

Off the coast of Australia and in Oceania, the species is considered invasive.

== Taxonomy ==
The genus Cheiracanthium was transferred from the Clubionidae to the Miturgidae, and then to the Cheiracanthiidae.
