= Myrmecicultor =

Scientific classification
- Kingdom: Animalia
- Phylum: Arthropoda
- Subphylum: Chelicerata
- Class: Arachnida
- Order: Araneae
- Infraorder: Araneomorphae
- Family: Myrmecicultoridae; Ramírez, Grismado & Ubick, 2019
- Genus: Myrmecicultor; Ramírez, Grismado & Ubick, 2019
- Species: M. chihuahuensis

Binomial name
- Myrmecicultor chihuahuensis Ramírez, Grismado & Ubick, 2019

Genus of spiders

Myrmecicultor is a monotypic genus of North American spiders in the family Myrmecicultoridae. It contains the single species, Myrmecicultor chihuahuensis, and was first described by M. J. Ramírez, C. J. Grismado and D. Ubick in 2019. It is native to the Chihuahuan Desert, from the Big Bend region of Texas to Coahuila and Aguascalientes in Mexico. Collected specimens were found in pitfall traps where three species of harvester ants are most active: Pogonomyrmex rugosus, Novomessor albisetosus, and Novomessor cockerelli.

== Description ==
This family consists of ecribellate spiders in the Entelegynae sub-group. They have two tarsal claws without claw tufts, and males have a retrolateral tibial apophysis on their pedipalp. Although some morphological characteristics suggest a relation to Zodariidae or Prodidominae, molecular phylogenetics analyses show a separate lineage within the Entelegynae, and it was placed into its own family.
