= Zodarion germanicum =

Scientific classification
- Kingdom: Animalia
- Phylum: Arthropoda
- Subphylum: Chelicerata
- Class: Arachnida
- Order: Araneae
- Infraorder: Araneomorphae
- Family: Zodariidae
- Genus: Zodarion
- Species: Z. germanicum

Binomial name
- Zodarion germanicum (C. L. Koch, 1837)

Synonyms
- Lucia germanica Clubiona amussa Argus germanica Enyo germanica

Species of spider

Zodarion germanicum is a spider species of the family Zodariidae.

Like most Zodariidae, Z. germanicum is an ant-eating spider. It resembles ants structurally and behaviorally. Z. germanicum specifically mimics large dark ants, such as Formica cinerea, F. truncorum, and Camponotus ligniperda.

Zodarion germanicum is up to 5 mm in size. Adults occur in Germany from June to August. Unlike many other zodariid spiders, it is active during the day.

If the spider encounters an ant, it retreats and stalks its prey from behind. The bitten ant will continue its walk for about a minute before the poison immobilizes it. Only now the spider will approach its prey and carries it to its hideout.

== Distribution ==
Zodarion germanicum is distributed in Central Europe, Italy, and southeastern Europe.

== Phenology ==
Juvenile Zodarion germanicum become active in April, and, after two weeks, approximately 80% of the population has fully matured into adults. For fully matured adults, mating begins in April as well.

== Shelter ==
When the spiders are not out (primarily hunting), they “rest and molt in retreats. The retreats are closed solitary “igloo-shaped” shelters, usually attached to a solid substrate, such as the lower surface of stones, usually near an ant nest entrance. Often an aggregation of retreats attached to a stone was found. In the field, the retreats were constructed with a wide variety of materials (e.g., soil or sand grains, plant material, pine needles) held together by webbing” (Pekar 2001). When the retreat is destroyed, the spiders reconstruct it and - in the absence of suitable materials - females spin a sheet web to hide under. Males will, under no circumstances, spin a sheet web.

== Courtship_and_Mating ==
Zodarion germanicum has a very complex courtship ritual. Firstly, males very slowly approach females, while vibrating their whole body, waiving their raised forearms, and drumming their palps. When the male has reached a female, he lightly touches her with his forearms, and they then “spar” with palps. If the female consents, then she stays in a normal position while the male inserts “palpal organs first from one side, then from the other side” (Pekar 2001). 

== Fertility_and_Brood ==
Z. germanicum produces eggs that are laid in wolly silk sacks. In one cocoon, there are an average of 16.5 eggs, and each egg has a diameter of approximately 0.9 mm. The eggs are produced around 14 days after copulation. Once the eggs are created, the female Z. germanicum creates a large retreat, and leaves only once every four days to feed. After approximately 40 days, the female dies, and the eggs hatch. The spiderlings stay in the retreat - feeding on the mother - until their first molt, which is within a few days. They then finally leave the large retreat through a small hole, and create retreats of their own. 

== Sources ==
- Kosmos-Atlas Spinnentiere Europas (German)
