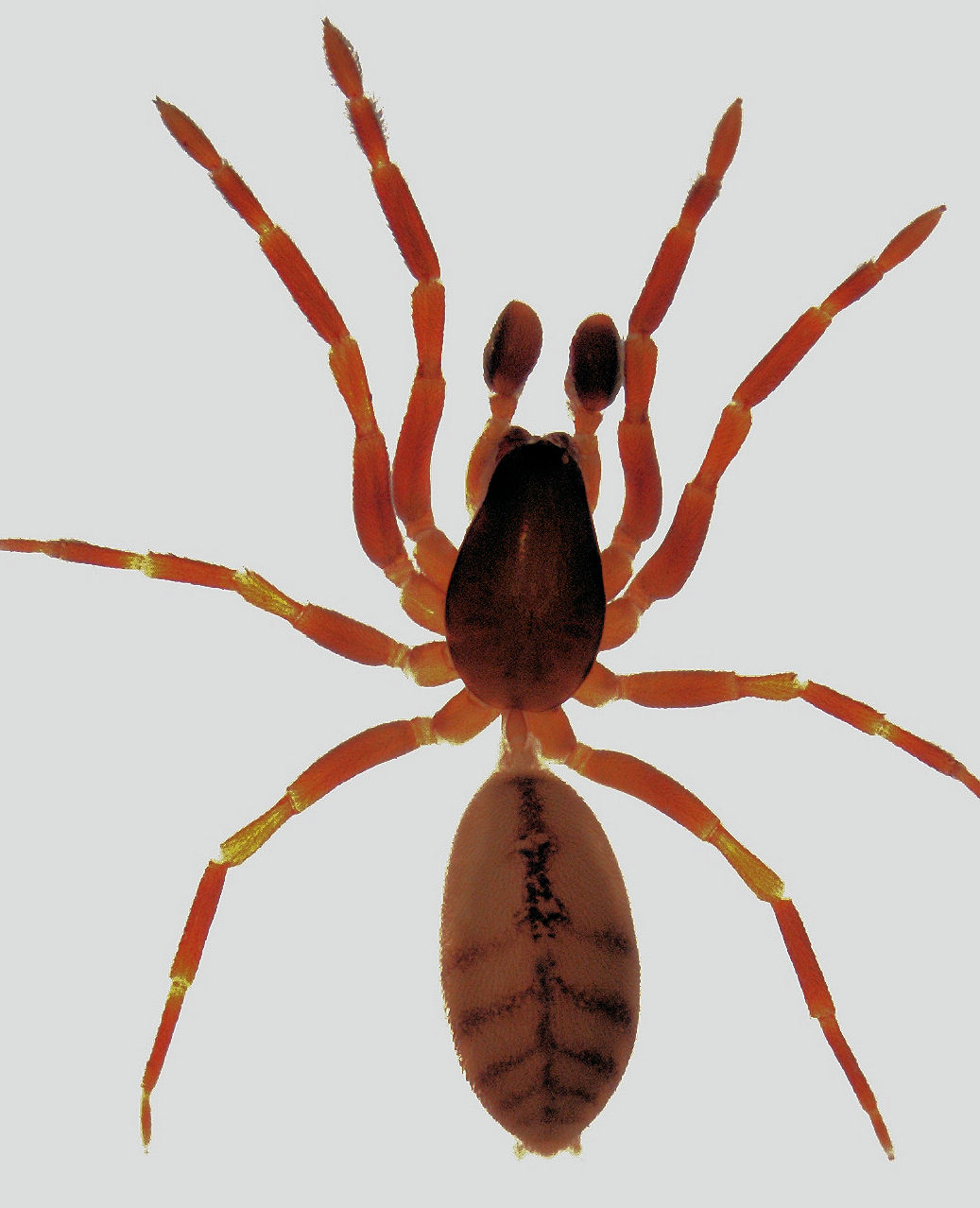
- male Huttonia sp.

Conservation status
- Naturally Uncommon (NZ TCS)

Scientific classification
- Kingdom: Animalia
- Phylum: Arthropoda
- Subphylum: Chelicerata
- Class: Arachnida
- Order: Araneae
- Infraorder: Araneomorphae
- Family: Huttoniidae; Forster & Platnick, 1984
- Genus: Huttonia; O. Pickard-Cambridge, 1879
- Species: H. palpimanoides

Binomial name
- Huttonia palpimanoides O. Pickard-Cambridge, 1880
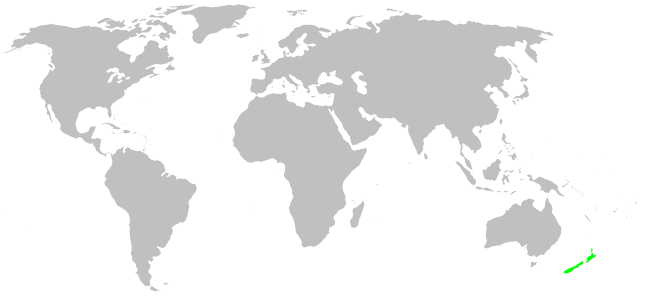
- Distribution (green; click to enlarge)

= Huttonia =

Huttonia Temporal range: Cretaceous–present

Family of spiders

Huttoniidae is a family of ecribellate araneomorph spiders containing a single genus, Huttonia, itself containing a single described species, Huttonia palpimanoides. It is known only from New Zealand.

Very few specimens of the genus were known until it was discovered that they primarily inhabited dead fronds of rainforest ferns.

== Taxonomy ==
It was first described by Octavius Pickard-Cambridge in 1880. Originally placed with the ant spiders (Zodariidae), it was moved to a family of its own, Huttoniidae, in 1984, in the superfamily Palpimanoidea.

Fossils of this family have been found in Cretaceous (Campanian) amber from Alberta and Manitoba, Canada. This extended the known geological age of the Huttoniidae back about 80 million years, supporting the theory of H. palpimanoides being an ousted relict species. They are probably most closely related to the now extinct family, Spatiatoridae.

Although only one species is described, about twenty more undescribed species are thought to exist.

== Conservation status ==
Under the New Zealand Threat Classification System, this species is listed as "Naturally Uncommon" with the qualifier of "Range Restricted".
