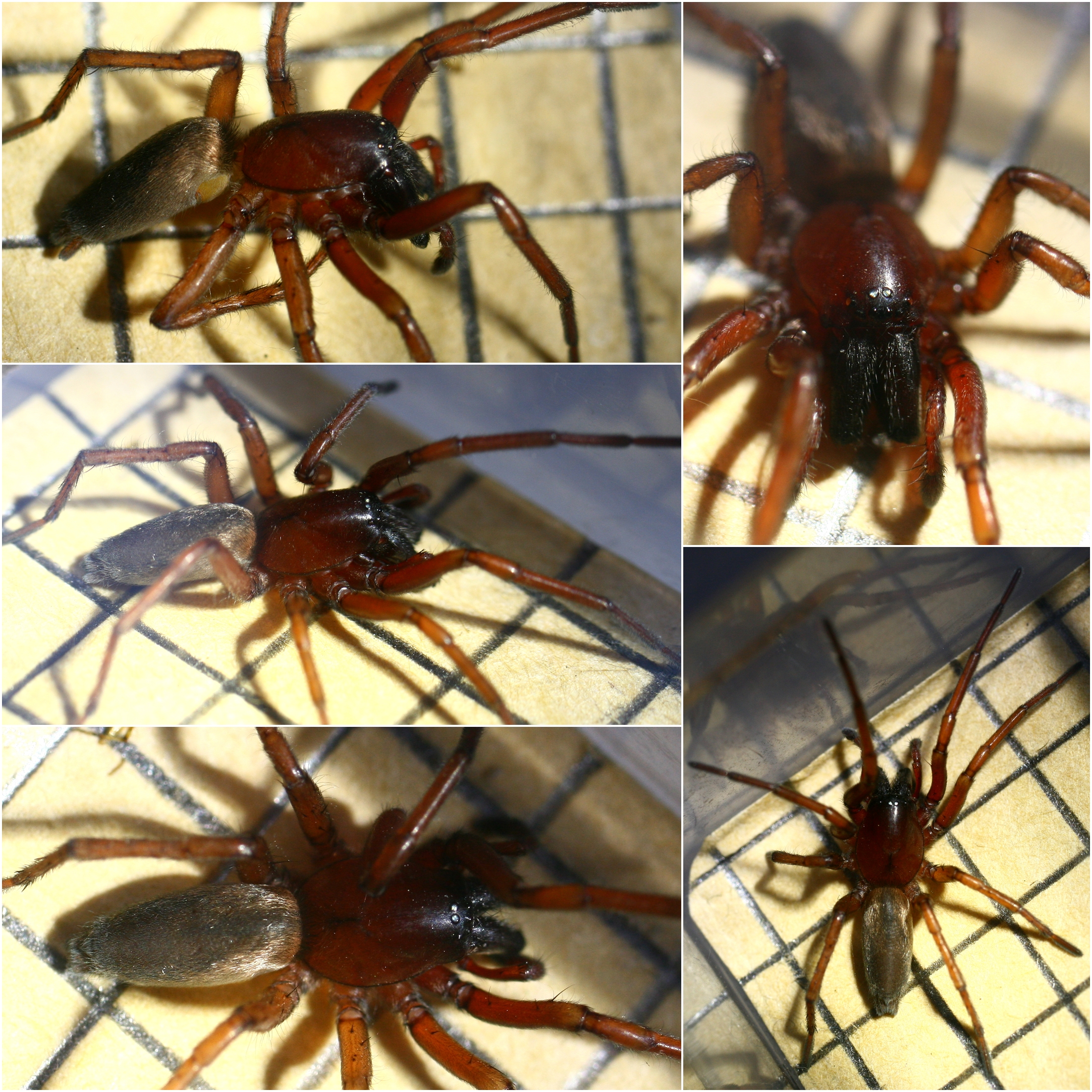
- Male

Scientific classification
- Domain: Eukaryota
- Kingdom: Animalia
- Phylum: Arthropoda
- Subphylum: Chelicerata
- Class: Arachnida
- Order: Araneae
- Infraorder: Araneomorphae
- Family: Gnaphosidae
- Genus: Drassodes
- Species: D. cupreus

Binomial name
- Drassodes cupreus (Blackwall, 1834)

= Drassodes cupreus =

Species of spider

Drassodes cupreus is a species of spider in the genus Drassodes, family Gnaphosidae. A ground-living nocturnal hunter, it spends the day in a silken retreat.

== Description ==
Females are 10–18 mm, males 10–13 mm. The carapace (the upper surface of the prosoma) is brownish with a darker border. The abdomen (opisthosoma) is hairy and similarly coloured. The posterior median eyes are closely spaced. In general appearance, D. cupreus cannot be distinguished from other Drassodes species, such as Drassodes lapidosus. Identification relies on the shape of the epigyne in the female, and the arrangement of the teeth on the chelicerae and shape of the palpal bulb in the male.

Like other species of Drassodes, Drassodes cupreus is a nocturnal hunter, spending the day in a silken retreat. Mature females are found throughout the year, mature males only in spring and summer.

== Taxonomy ==
Drassodes cupreus was first described by John Blackwall in 1834, on the basis of specimens found near Manchester and Llanrwst in Great Britain.

== Distribution and habitat ==
Drassodes cupreus has a Palearctic distribution. It is considered to be generally more common than the related D. lapidosus. It occurs at ground level, under stones, in leaf-litter and around the bases of grass tussocks, often in particularly dry sites. In the south of Great Britain, it is found in heathland.
