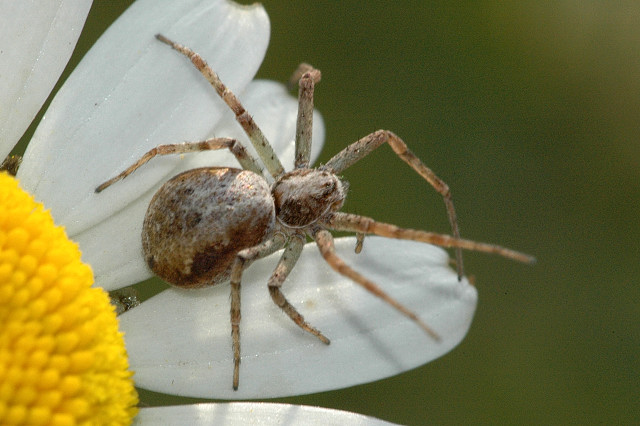
- Female
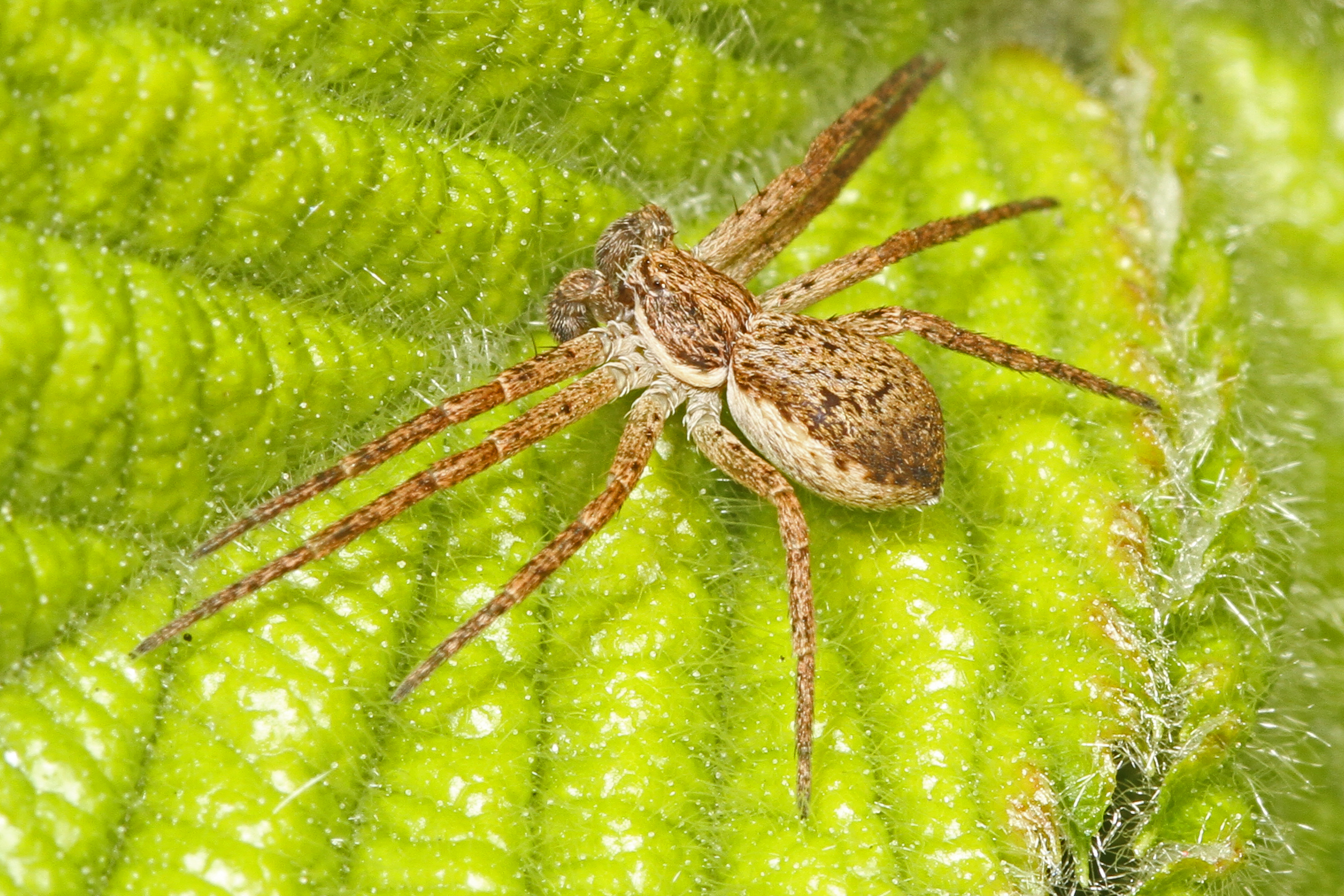
- Male

Scientific classification
- Kingdom: Animalia
- Phylum: Arthropoda
- Subphylum: Chelicerata
- Class: Arachnida
- Order: Araneae
- Infraorder: Araneomorphae
- Family: Philodromidae
- Genus: Philodromus
- Species: P. dispar

Binomial name
- Philodromus dispar Walckenaer, 1826
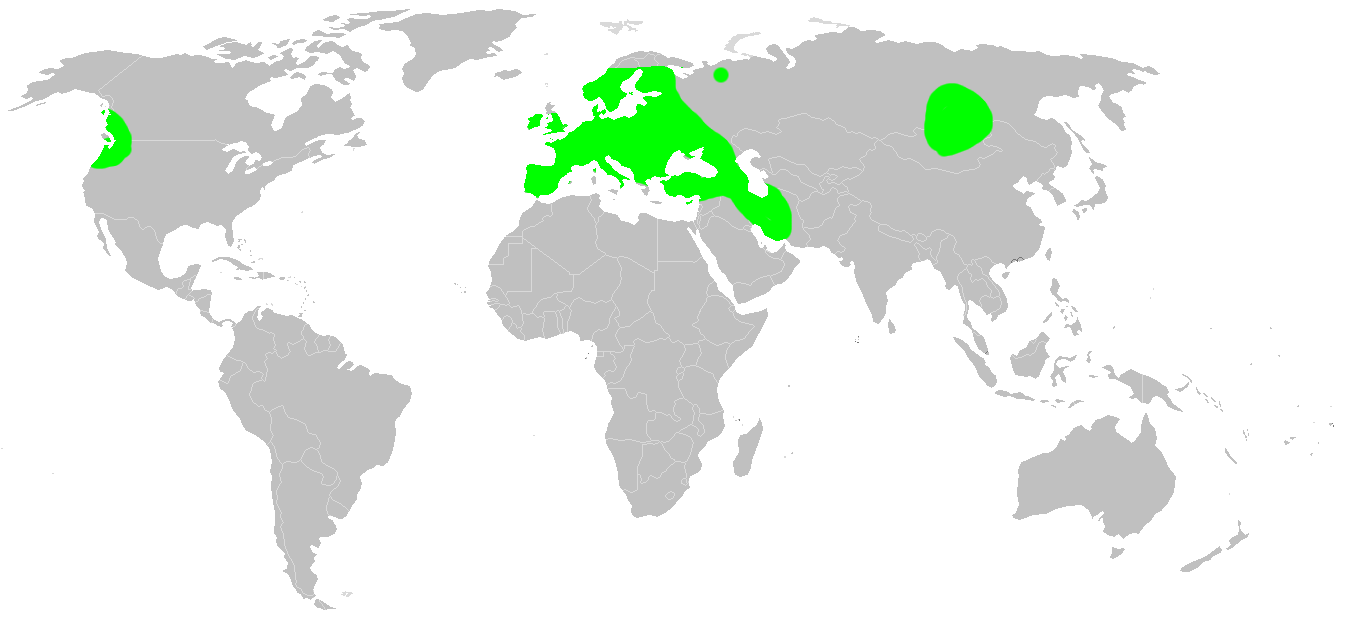

= Philodromus dispar =

Species of spider

Philodromus dispar is a philodromid crab spider found on trees and bushes. It is an agile hunter. The female of the species is variable in size and colour. The male is shiny and iridescent black or dark brown with white edges.

The spider is about 5mm long; it feeds on flies and other insects. It does not build a web, but hunts its prey by remaining stationary in ambush and awaiting prey to come near it.
