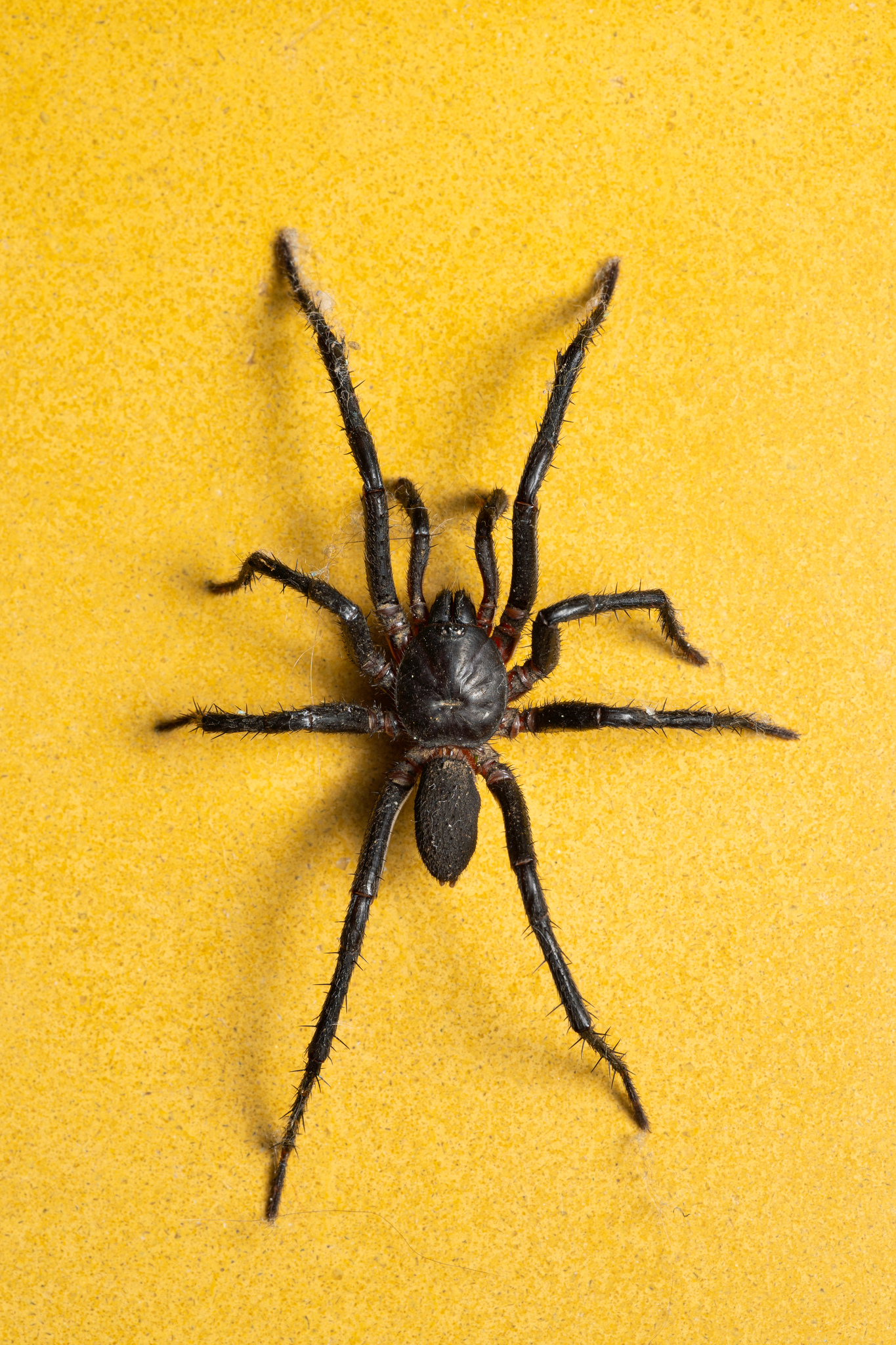
- Melloina sp. from Colombia
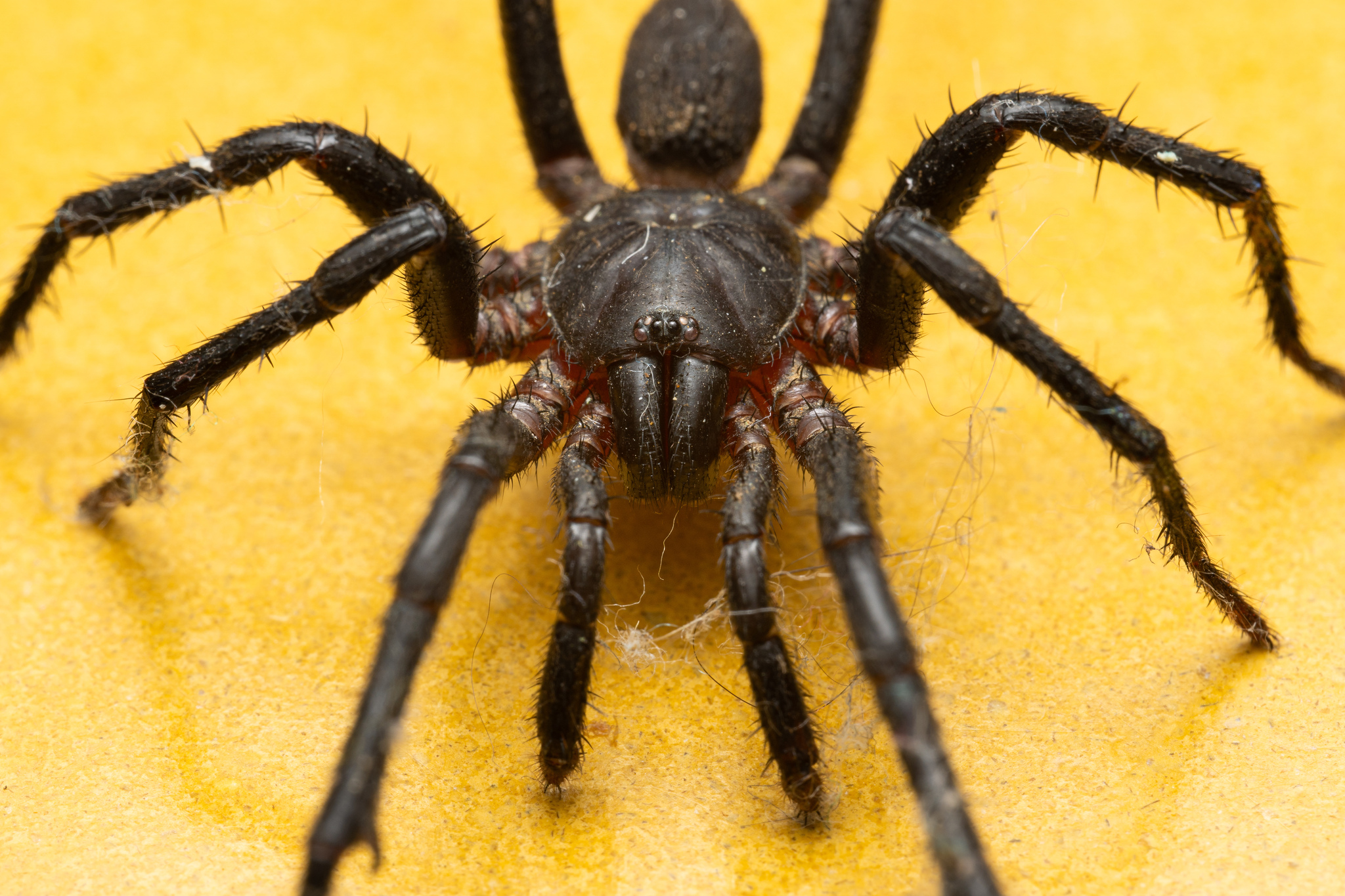
- Melloina sp. from Colombia

Scientific classification
- Kingdom: Animalia
- Phylum: Arthropoda
- Subphylum: Chelicerata
- Class: Arachnida
- Order: Araneae
- Infraorder: Mygalomorphae
- Family: Melloinidae
- Genus: Melloina; Brignoli, 1985

Type species
- M. gracilis (Schenkel, 1953)

Species
- see text
- blue: reported countries (WSC)

Synonyms
- Glabropelma Raven, 1985

= Melloina =

Genus of spiders

Melloina is a genus of baldlegged spiders that was first described by Paolo Marcello Brignoli in 1985. Its five described species are found in Panama, Colombia, and Venezuela.

== Systematics ==
Previously grouped under Theraphosidae and Paratropididae, this genus was placed in the monotypic family Melloinidae in 2025.

== Species ==
As of January 2026, this genus includes five species:

- Melloina condesa Perafán, Montes de Oca & Pérez-Miles, 2025 – Colombia
- Melloina gracilis (Schenkel, 1953) – Venezuela
- Melloina pacifica Echeverri, Gómez Torres, Pinel & Perafán, 2023 – Colombia
- Melloina rickwesti Raven, 1999 – Panama
- Melloina santuario Bertani, 2013 – Venezuela
