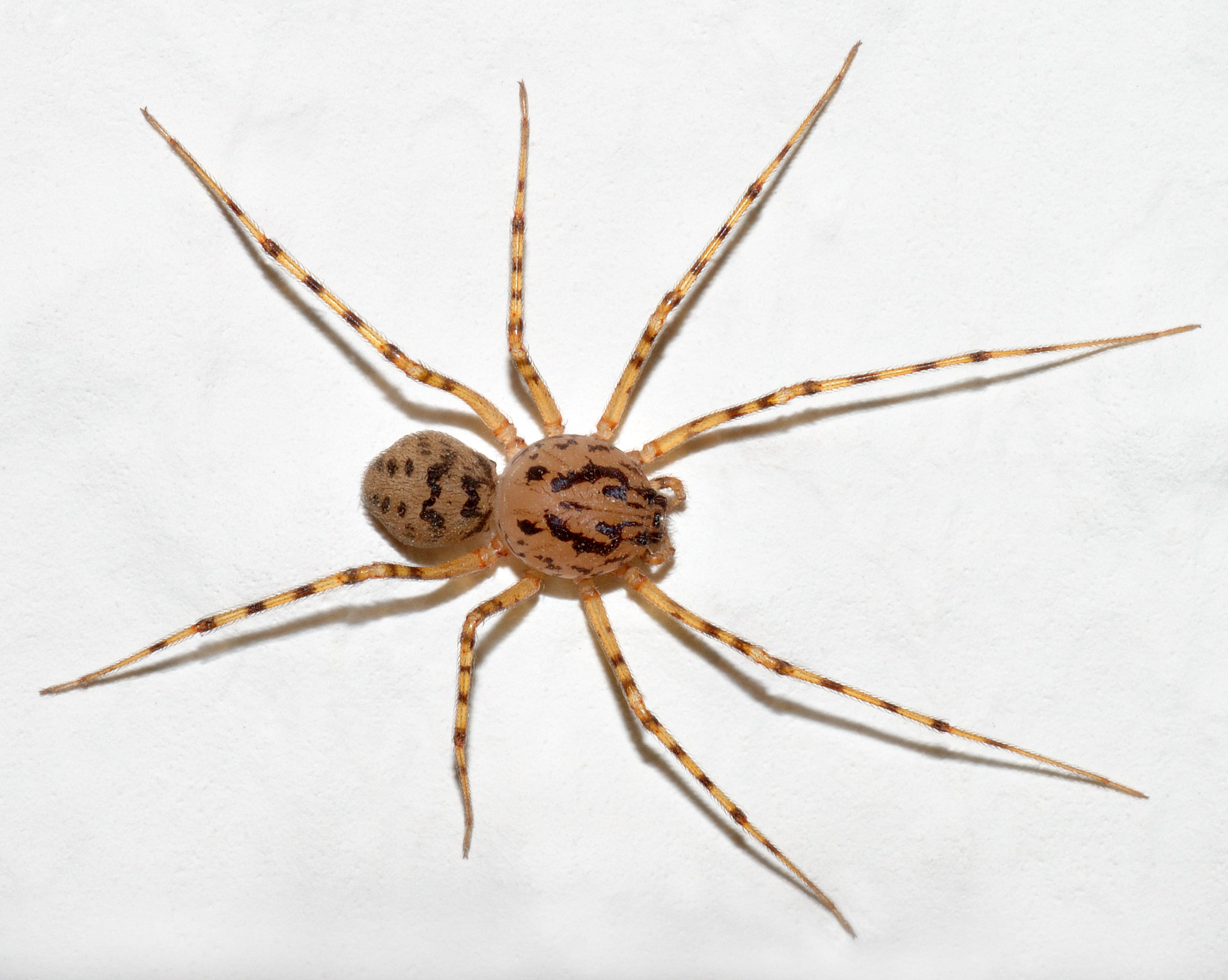

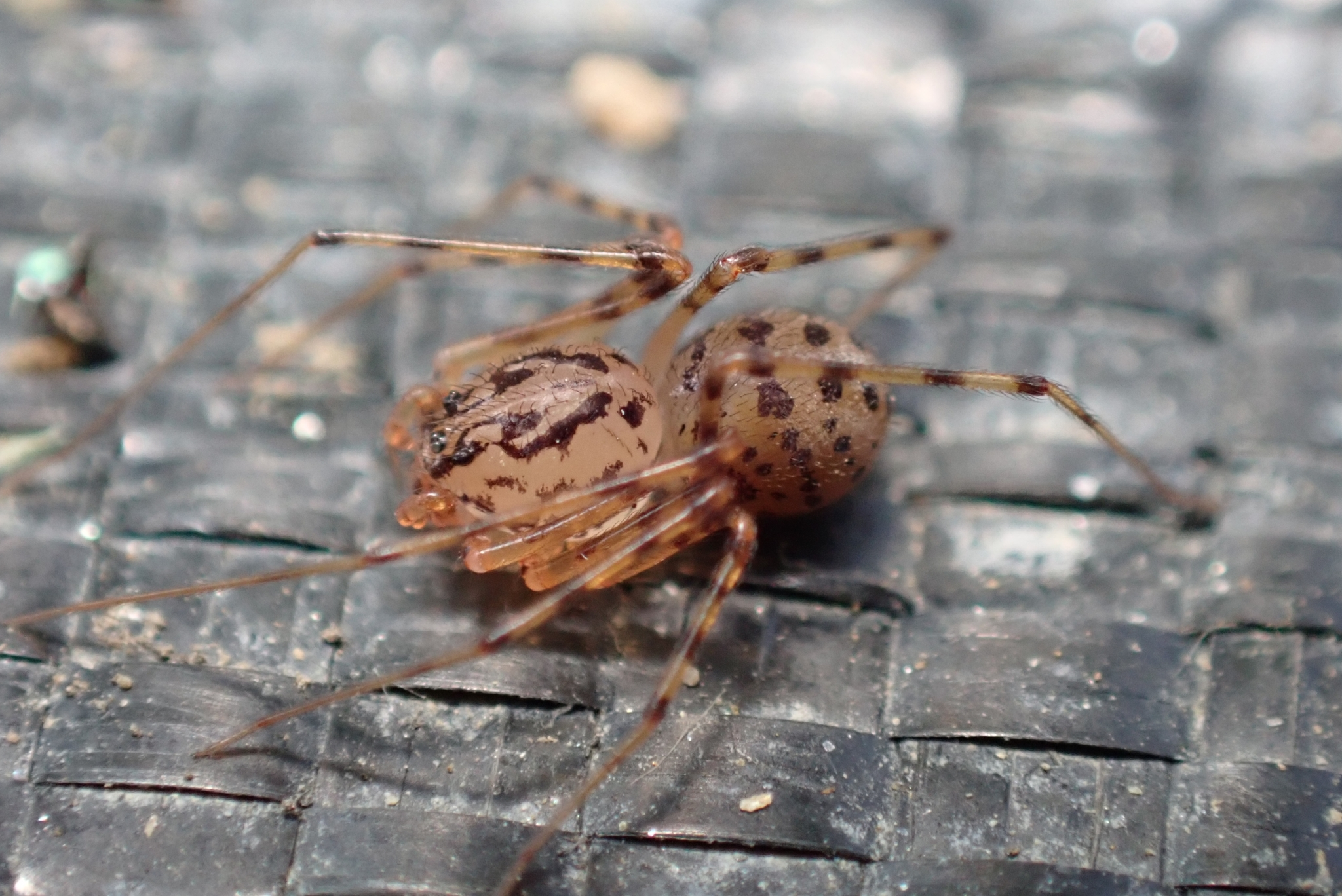
- S. thoracica in Romania

Scientific classification
- Kingdom: Animalia
- Phylum: Arthropoda
- Subphylum: Chelicerata
- Class: Arachnida
- Order: Araneae
- Infraorder: Araneomorphae
- Family: Scytodidae
- Genus: Scytodes
- Species: S. thoracica

Binomial name
- Scytodes thoracica (Latreille, 1802)

Synonyms
- Aranea thoracica Latreille, 1802; Scytodes tigrina C. L. Koch, 1838; Scytodes cameratus Hentz, 1850

= Scytodes thoracica =

Species of spider

Scytodes thoracica is a spitting spider, so called because it spits a venomous sticky silken substance over its prey. Its size ranges between 3–6 mm (0.12–0.24 in). The carapace is unusual in sloping upwards towards its rear end, whereas the abdomen slopes downwards.

As a member of family Scytodidae, it has six eyes instead of the eight spiders commonly have.

This particular spitting spider features the presence of silk glands in its cephalothorax. Besides the silk glands in its abdomen, the spider also has silk glands connected with its venom glands. In this way the spider has the ability to make venomous silk. Other arachnids may also have silk glands in their cephalothorax, such as the pseudoscorpions.

== Distribution ==
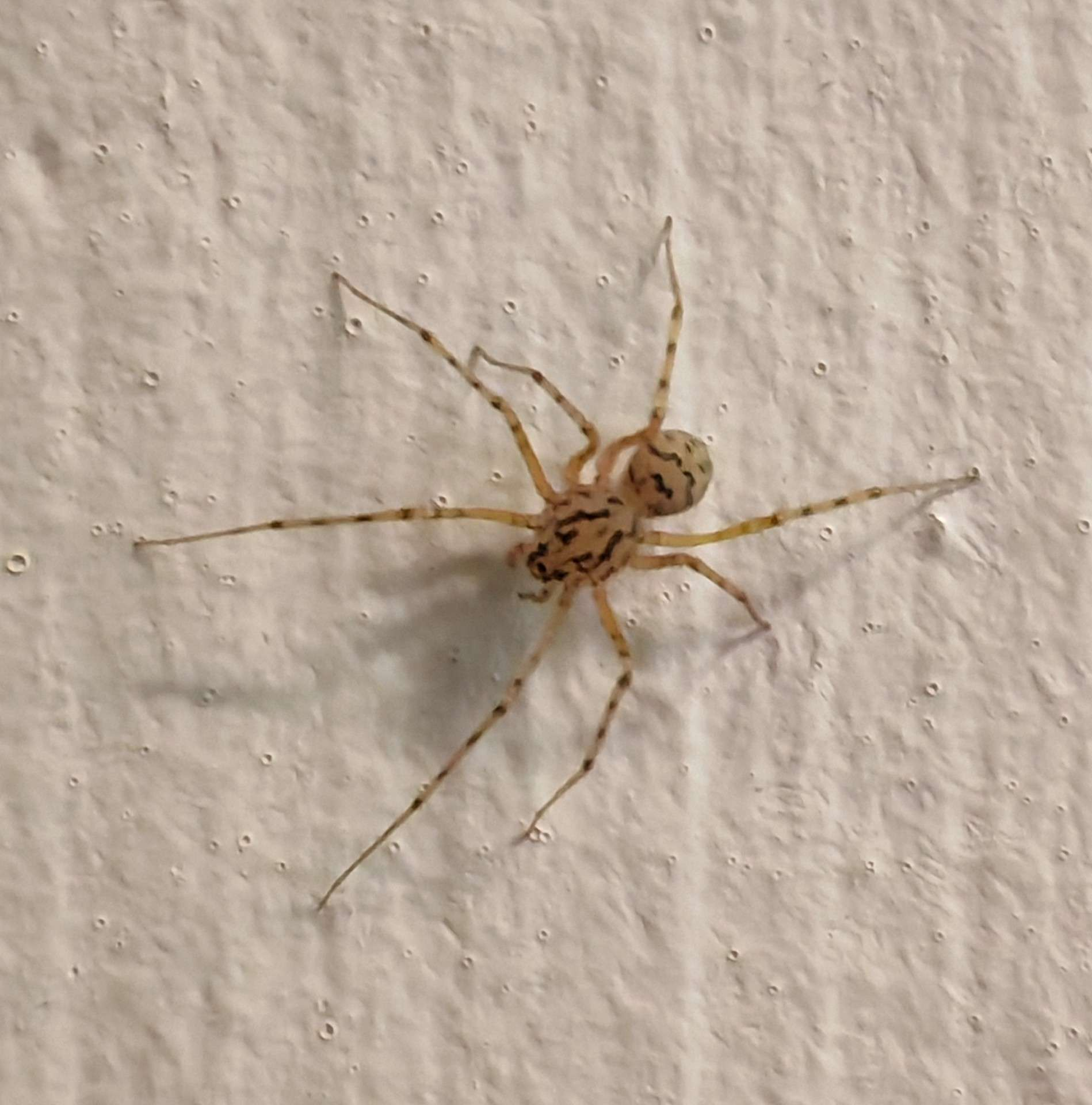
Scytodes thoracica in Essex, England.

It is a cosmopolitan species, being found in Europe, North Africa, Turkey, temperate Asia to China, Korea and Japan. It has been introduced to North America, Chile, Argentina, India, Australia and New Zealand.

In South Africa, it is recorded from three provinces, Gauteng, KwaZulu-Natal, and Limpopo.

In the UK, its range rarely stretches beyond southern England, with few recorded sightings beyond there.

== Habitat and ecology ==
This is a cosmopolitan species frequently found in houses, where it wanders about at night. In South Africa, it inhabits the Grassland and Savanna biomes at altitudes ranging from 68 to 1444 m above sea level. It is a wandering spider commonly collected from under stones and dark places on the soil surface.

== Behavior ==
=== Hunting tactics ===
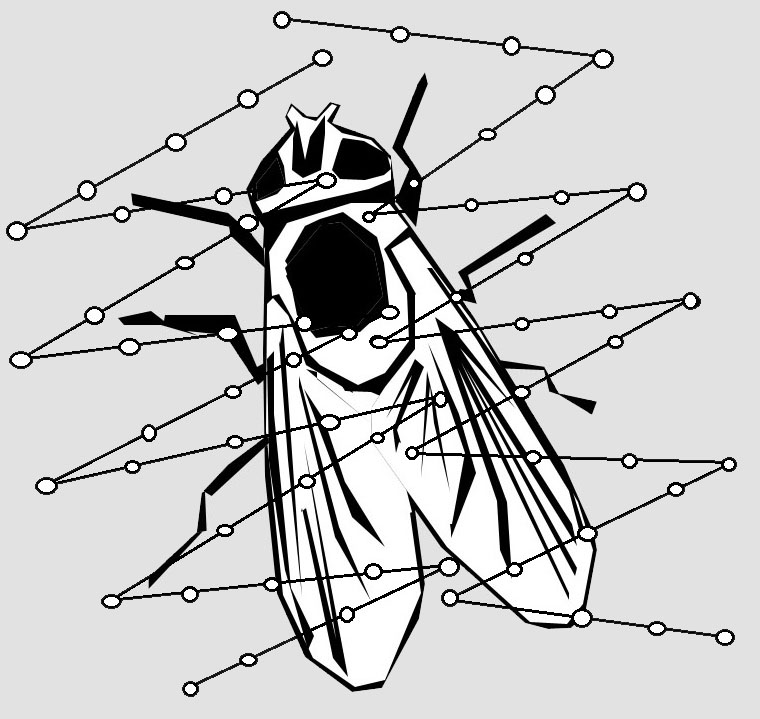
Schematic illustration of an immobilised prey

In contrast to the pseudoscorpions that use the silk from the cephalothorax glands to make nests, the spitting spider uses it to catch prey in a very particular way. It is a very slow hunter as its long and tender legs may suggest. During night, when some insects are less active, Scytodes starts its hunt. The spider sneaks very carefully towards its prey and, from about 10 mm (0.39 in), stops and carefully measures the distance to its prey with one front leg without disturbing it. Then it squeezes the back of its body together and spits two silk threads, in 1/600 s, in a zigzag manner over the victim. The prey is immediately immobilized. When the prey is larger the spider spits several times. It is assumed the spider uses special long hearing hairs located at its legs to locate its prey.

=== Reproduction ===
The mother makes a nursery web for the emerged spiderlings, and carries her eggs under her belly in a net of silk.

== Conservation ==
Scytodes thoracica is listed as Least Concern by the South African National Biodiversity Institute due to its wide geographical range. The species is protected in Blouberg Nature Reserve.
