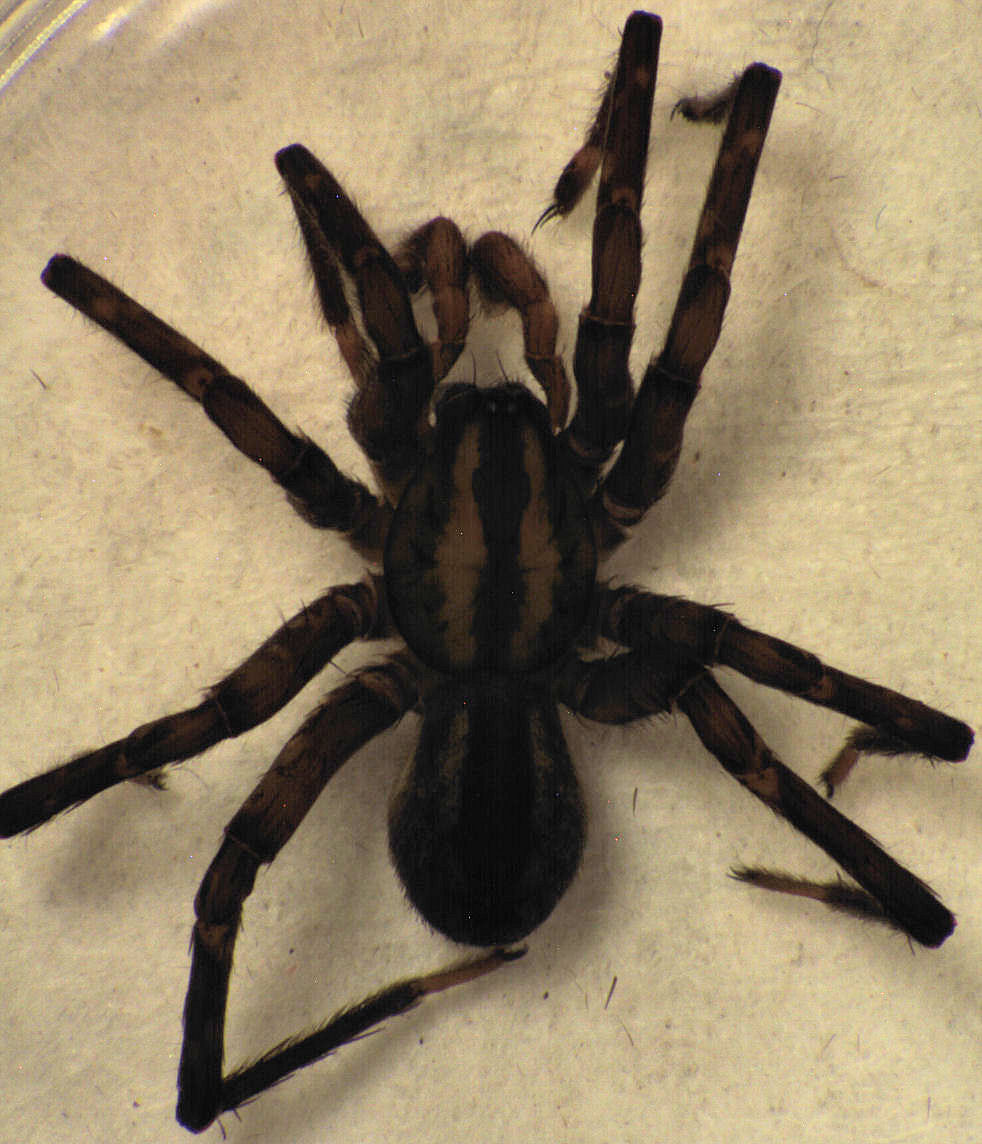
- Gradungula sorenseni male

Scientific classification
- Kingdom: Animalia
- Phylum: Arthropoda
- Subphylum: Chelicerata
- Class: Arachnida
- Order: Araneae
- Infraorder: Araneomorphae
- Superfamily: Austrochiloidea

Families
- Austrochilidae Zapfe, 1955; Gradungulidae Forster, 1955

= Austrochiloidea =

Superfamily of spiders

The Austrochiloidea or austrochiloids are a group of araneomorph spiders, treated as a superfamily. The taxon contains two families of eight-eyed spiders:

- Austrochilidae Zapfe, 1955
- Gradungulidae Forster, 1955

== Phylogeny ==
The monophyly of the Austrochiloidea has been supported in both morphological and molecular phylogenetic studies. The position of the clade relative to two much larger groups, Haplogynae and Entelegynae, has varied. A summary in 2005 showed the Austrochiloidea to be basal to both groups:

- - Austrochiloidea
  - - Haplogynae
    - Entelegynae

Two studies have placed representatives of the Austrochiloidea between the two, suggesting they have more derived characters than previously supposed:

- - Haplogynae
  - - Austrochiloidea
    - Entelegynae
