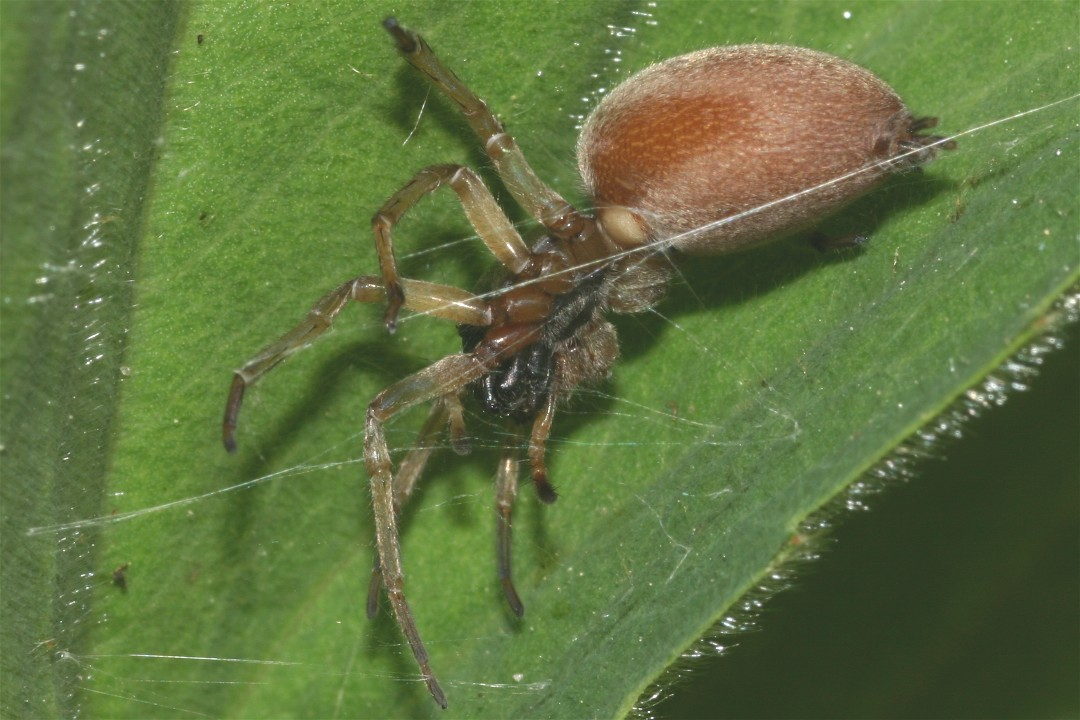

Conservation status
- Secure (NatureServe)

Scientific classification
- Kingdom: Animalia
- Phylum: Arthropoda
- Subphylum: Chelicerata
- Class: Arachnida
- Order: Araneae
- Infraorder: Araneomorphae
- Family: Clubionidae
- Genus: Clubiona
- Species: C. trivialis

Binomial name
- Clubiona trivialis C. L. Koch, 1843
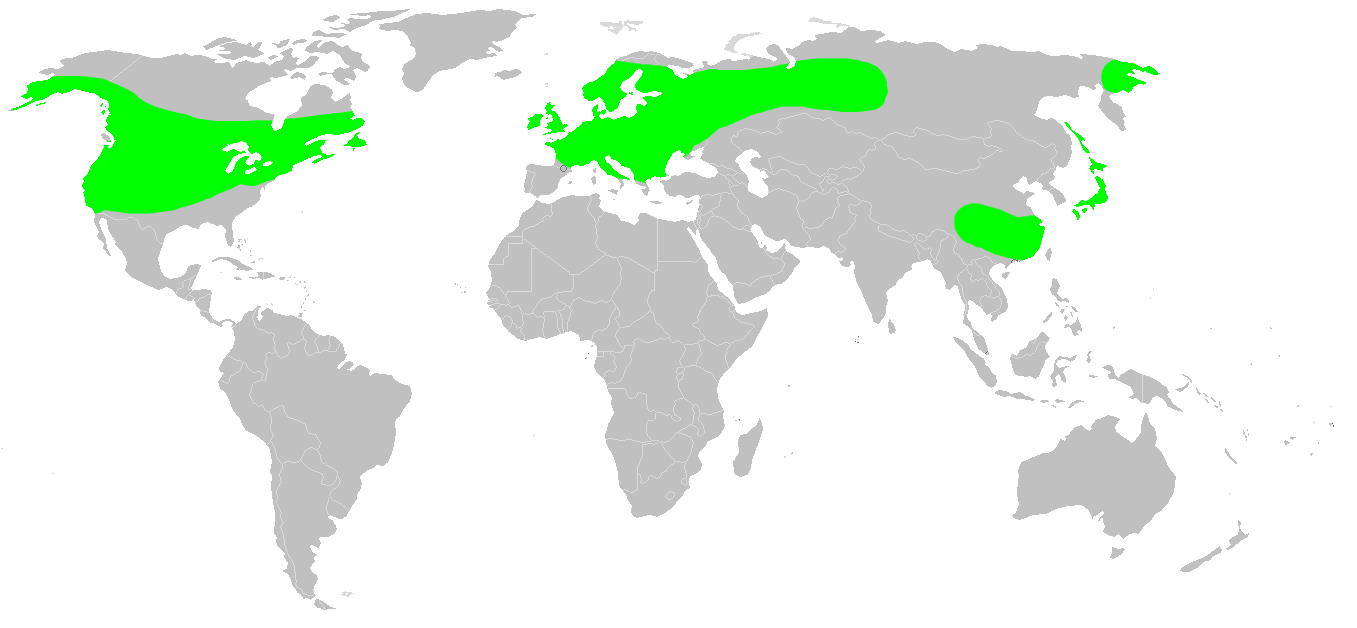

= Clubiona trivialis =

Species of spider

Clubiona trivialis is a small reddish brown spider with holarctic distribution. It is found in exposed places on low vegetation. Adults can be found throughout the year.
