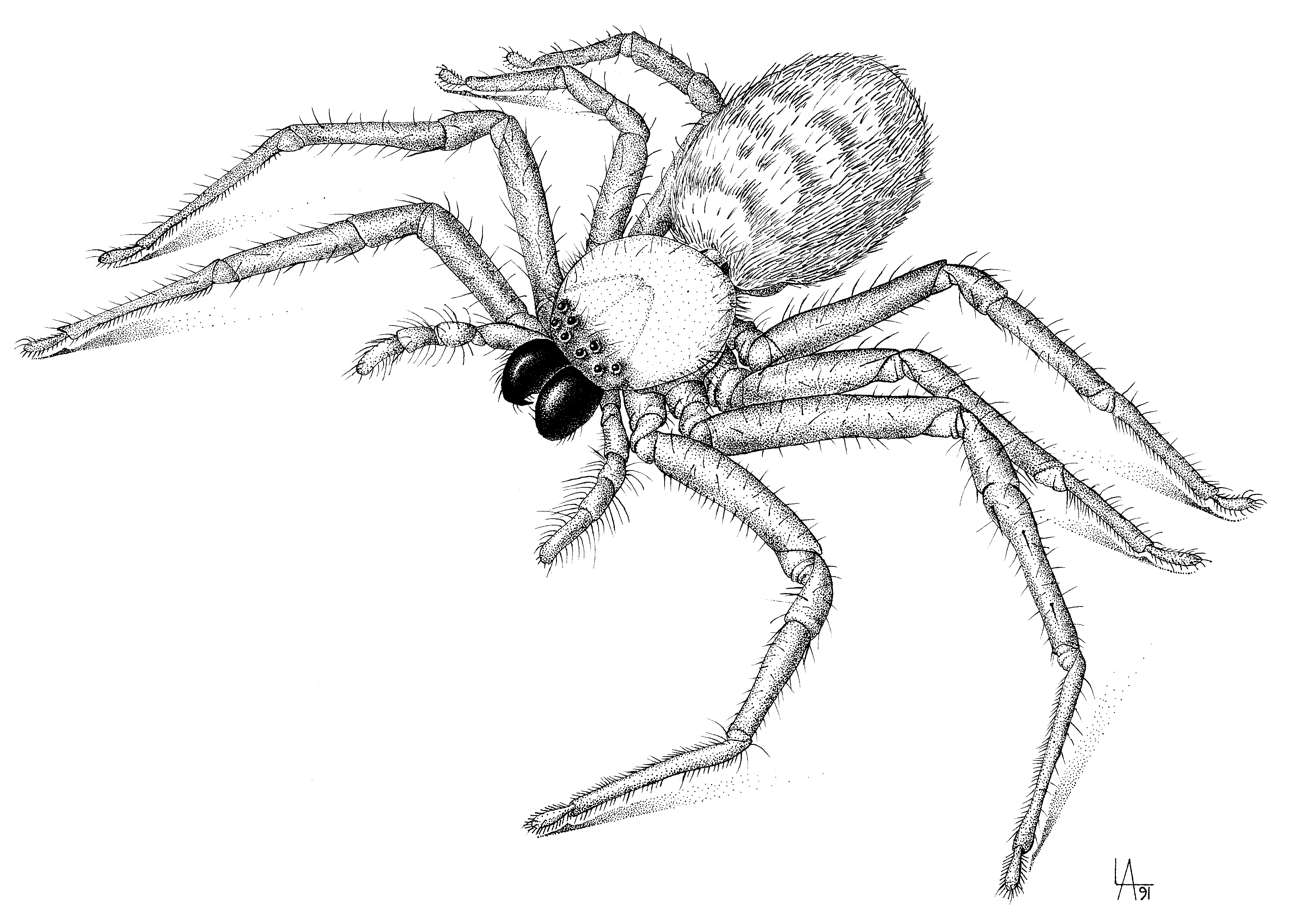

Scientific classification
- Kingdom: Animalia
- Phylum: Arthropoda
- Subphylum: Chelicerata
- Class: Arachnida
- Order: Araneae
- Infraorder: Araneomorphae
- Family: Sparassidae
- Genus: Delena
- Species: D. cancerides

Binomial name
- Delena cancerides Walckenaer, 1837

Synonyms
- Delena impressa; Thomisus cancerides

= Delena cancerides =

Species of spider

Delena cancerides, the communal huntsman, flat huntsman or social huntsman, is a large, brown huntsman spider native to Australia. It has been introduced to New Zealand, where it is sometimes known as the Avondale spider. This was the species used in the Australian movie Napoleon and widely in Arachnophobia, and all films depict them as having a deadly venomous bite, but they are generally considered harmless to humans in real-life. It was first described by Charles Athanase Walckenaer in 1837.

== Behaviour ==
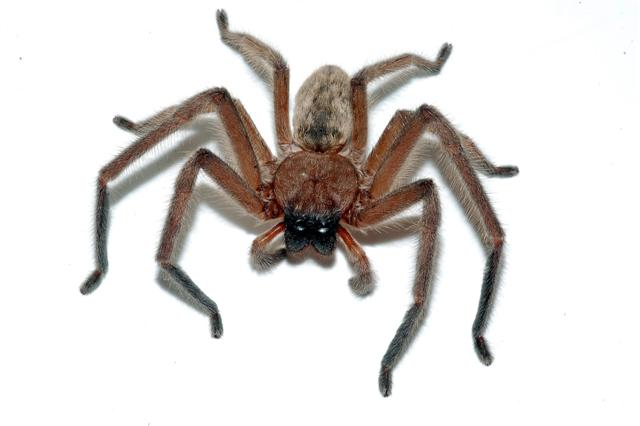

Highly unusual among spiders, the flat huntsman spider is a social species, even sharing prey. They are often found under loose bark (their flat shape is an adaptation for this) in colonies up to 300, but they are highly aggressive and commonly cannibalistic toward members from other colonies. They hunt their food rather than spin webs for it. They are timid towards humans and bites are infrequent, and when they occur, symptoms are usually very minor.

== Distribution ==
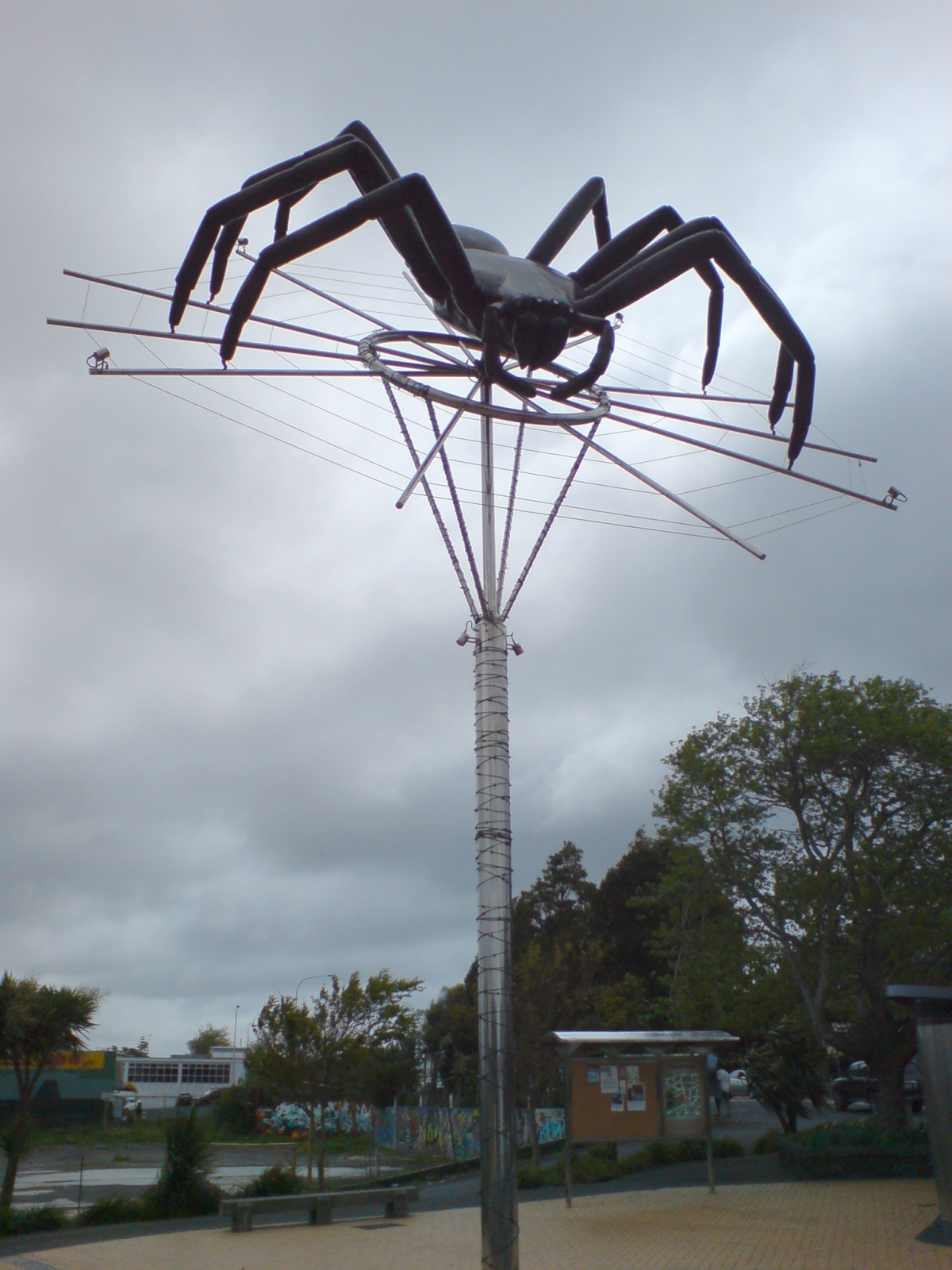
Avondale Spider Sculpture in Avondale, Auckland

The species is found all over Australia, including Tasmania. It was introduced to New Zealand in 1924. Its range in New Zealand expanded slowly out of Avondale, a suburb of Auckland, hence the alternative New Zealand common name. There is a sculpture in the Avondale shopping centre celebrating the spider.

== Appearance and genetics ==
Male D. cancerides have a body length of 20–25 millimetres (0.79–0.98 in), while females are larger, with a body length of 25–32 mm (0.98–1.26 in). The body is light brown and covered in dense, fine hairs. The legs are also hairy, and can have a span of over 15 centimetres (5.9 in).

Various populations show major differences in the chromosomes, leading to the recognition of several "chromosomal subspecies", but these hybridize where in contact and there is little genetic divergence.
