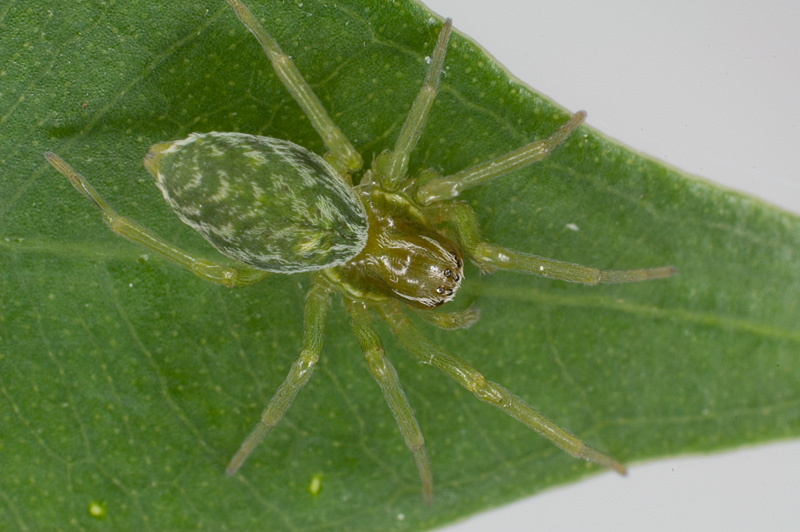
- Female
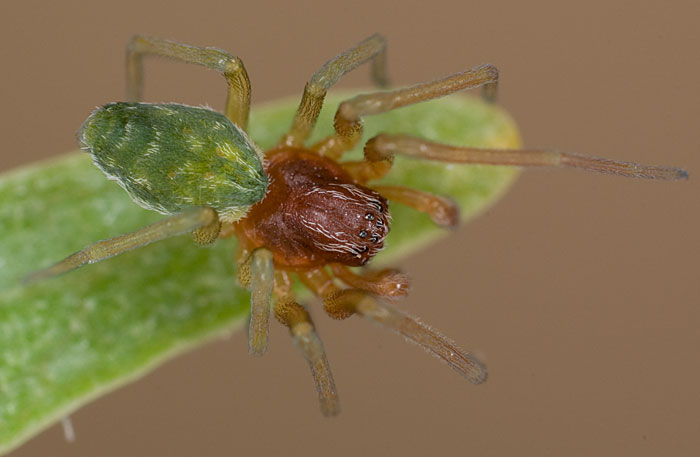
- Male

Scientific classification
- Kingdom: Animalia
- Phylum: Arthropoda
- Subphylum: Chelicerata
- Class: Arachnida
- Order: Araneae
- Infraorder: Araneomorphae
- Family: Dictynidae
- Genus: Nigma
- Species: N. walckenaeri

Binomial name
- Nigma walckenaeri (Roewer, 1951)
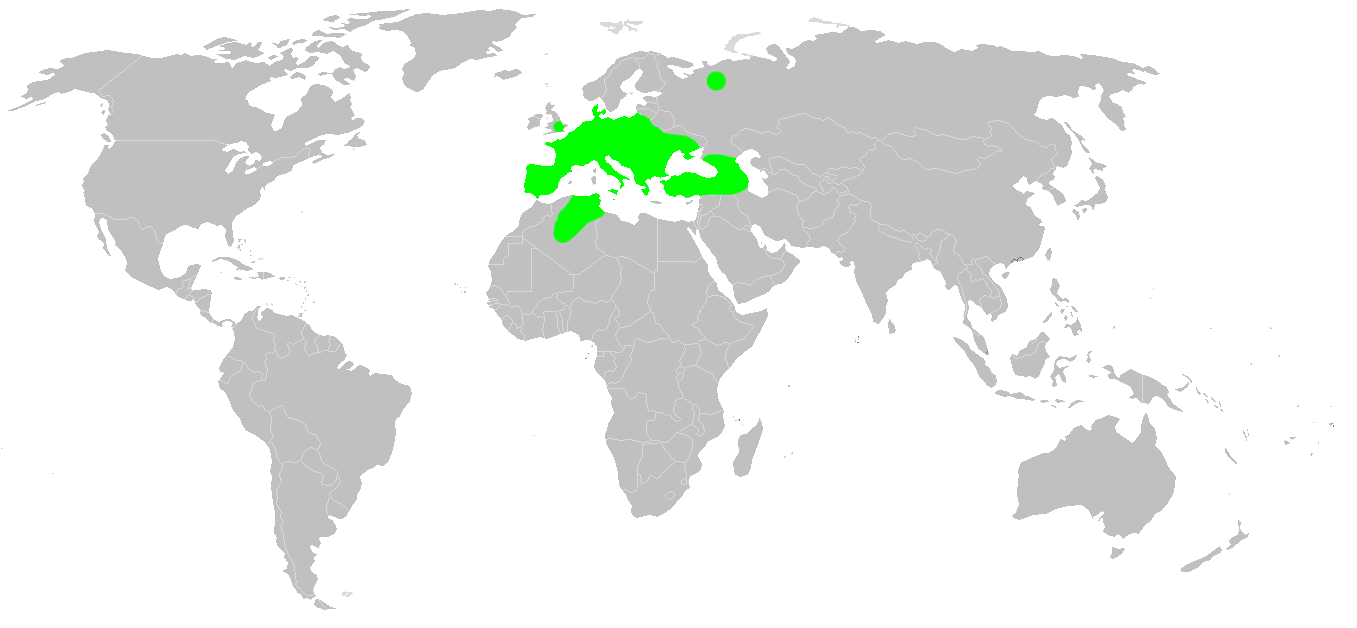

Synonyms
- Aranea viridissima Drassus viridissimus Ergatis viridissima Argus viridissimus Dictyna viridissima Dictyna walckenaeri Heterodictyna viridissima Heterodictyna walckenaeri

= Nigma walckenaeri =

Species of spider

Nigma walckenaeri is a green cribellate spider up to five millimetres long, the largest of the family Dictynidae. While most of the body is a somewhat yellowish color, the abdomen is a shining green, which makes it rather distinct and hard to confuse with other species. The green color makes it almost invisible. Males have an elevated head region. From August to October these spiders can be found in gardens or on walls - often on big leaves such as lilac or feral grapevine. The spider catches insects, sometimes larger than itself, in its web, which it builds on the surface of leaves. The female hides the 7-millimetre long egg sac on a place distant from its retreat.

The spider has a Palearctic distribution. In Great Britain, until 1993, it was only found in London and the Home Counties. It may originally have been imported into Kew Gardens.

== Name ==
The species is named in honor of Charles Athanase Walckenaer.
