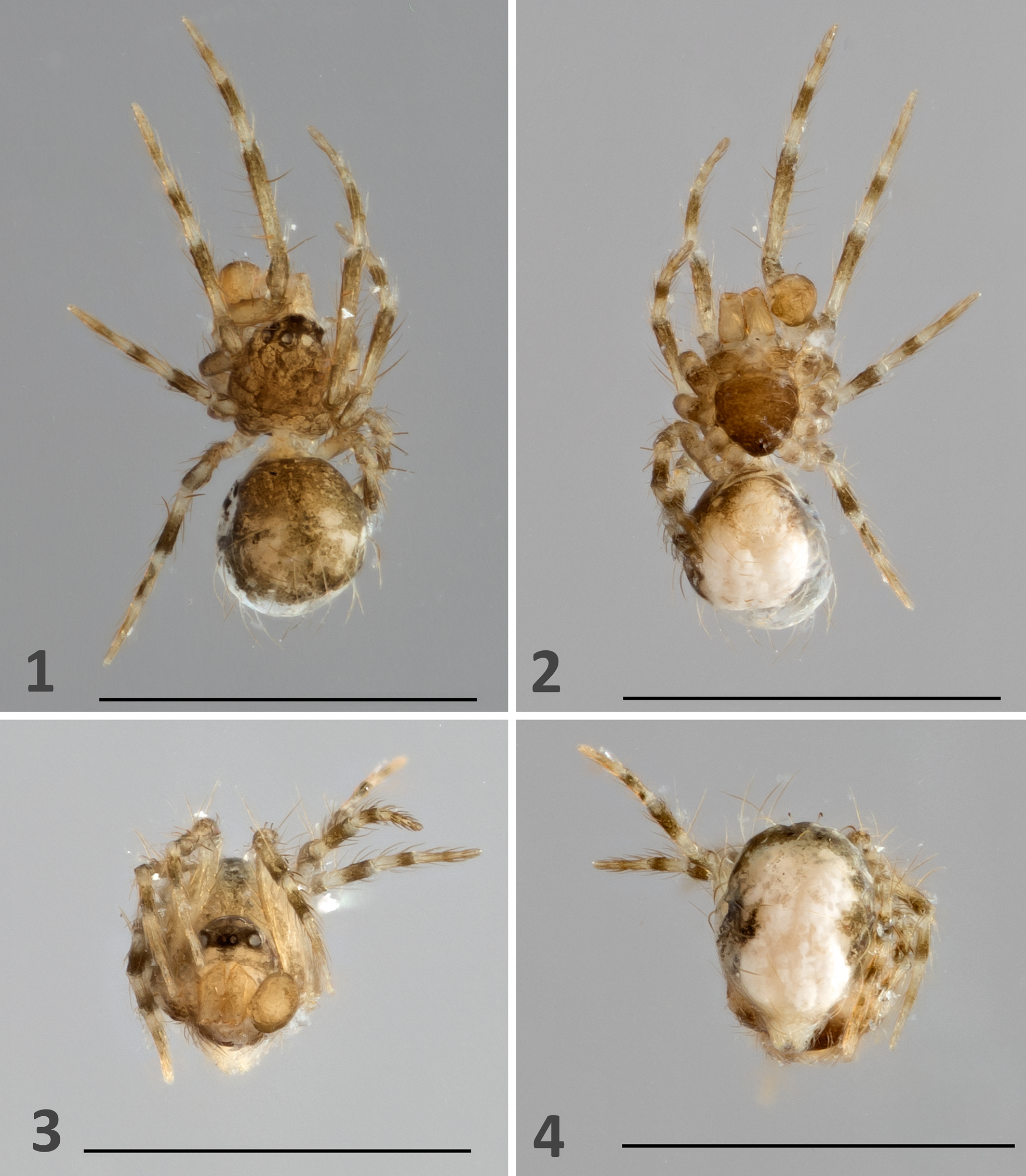
- F. minutissima holotype in top, bottom, front, and back views

Scientific classification
- Kingdom: Animalia
- Phylum: Arthropoda
- Subphylum: Chelicerata
- Class: Arachnida
- Order: Araneae
- Infraorder: Araneomorphae
- Superfamily: Araneoidea
- Family: Fonteferreidae; Wunderlich, 2023
- Genus: Fonteferrea; Wunderlich, 2023
- Species: F. minutissima

Binomial name
- Fonteferrea minutissima Wunderlich, 2023

= Fonteferrea =

Genus of the spiders

Fonteferrea is a genus of araneoid spider that contains one species, Fonteferrea minutissima. It is the sole member of the family Fonteferreidae. The family is only known from one male specimen found in the Algarve in southern Portugal, which was described in 2023 by Jörg Wunderlich. The generic name references the locality where the holotype was collected, Fonte Ferrea, in the Faro District.

== Description ==
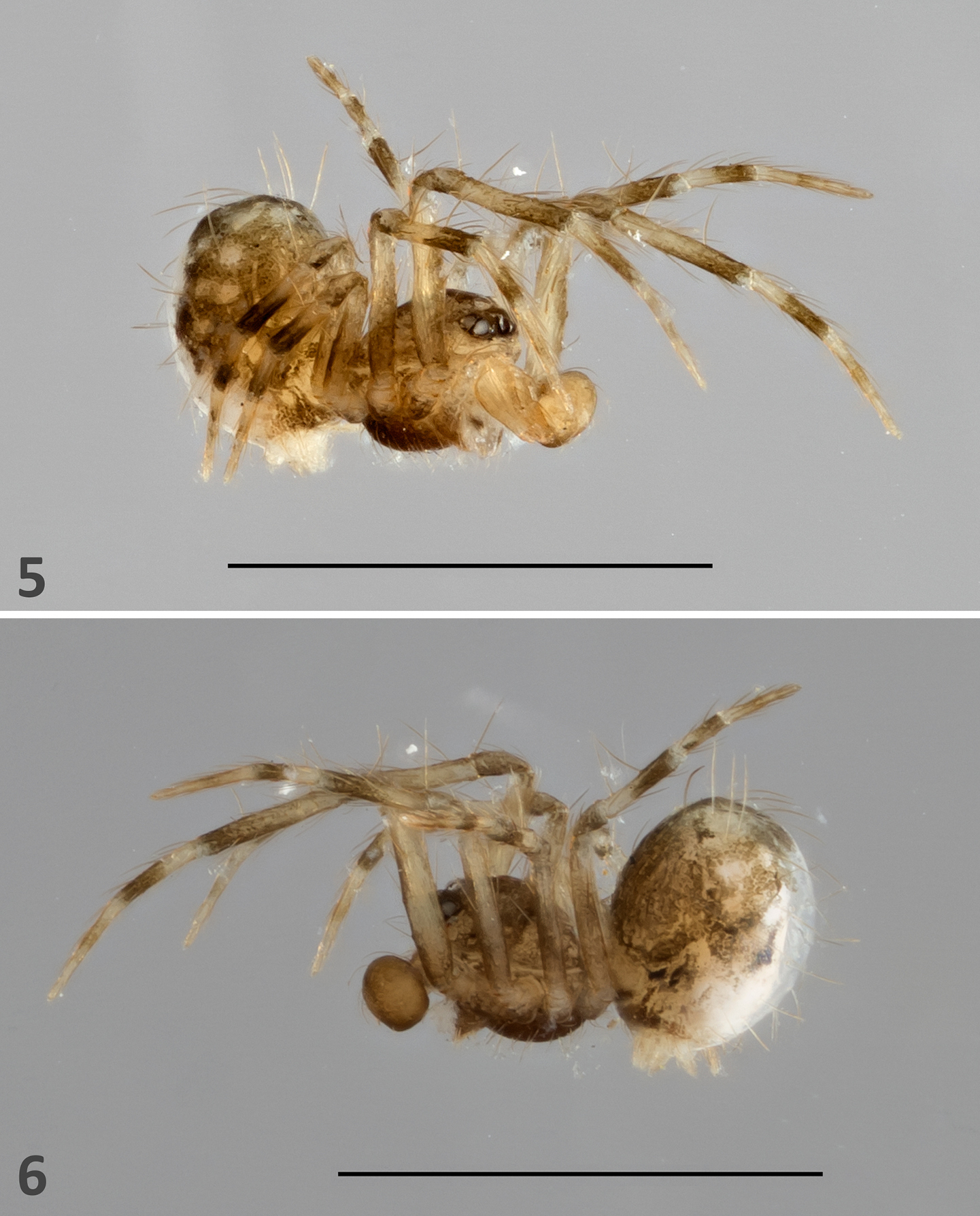
F. minutissima holotype in side views

F. minutissima is an extremely small spider, with a body length of 0.75 mm. The species is notable for the hairs present on the tegulum, a characteristic which very few spiders have.

== Name ==
The original author spelled the family name "Fonteferridae", which was standardized to "Fonteferreidae" by the World Spider Catalog.

== Taxonomy ==
Wunderlich suggests further species might be found in tropical Africa, as members of the "fairly related" family Synaphridae were first found in southern Europe and later in Madagascar. A 2026 reassessment of Fonteferrea, Fonteferrea minutissima, and Fonteferreidae by Lopardo et al. determined that the only known specimen is immature and lacks unique features (autapomorphies) distinguishing the taxon from others. As such, they regarded the family, genus, and species as nomina dubia, with resolution of this issue requiring the discovery of adult individuals.
