= List of Nesticidae species =

This page lists all described genera and species of the spider family Nesticidae. As of April 2019, the World Spider Catalog accepts 303 species in 16 genera:

== A ==
=== Aituaria ===
Aituaria Esyunin & Efimik, 1998

- Aituaria pontica (Spassky, 1932) — Ukraine, Russia (Europe, Urals, Caucasus), Georgia

== C ==
=== Canarionesticus ===
Canarionesticus Wunderlich, 1992

- Canarionesticus quadridentatus Wunderlich, 1992 (type) — Canary Is.

=== Carpathonesticus ===
Carpathonesticus Lehtinen & Saaristo, 1980

- Carpathonesticus avrigensis Weiss & Heimer, 1982 — Romania
- Carpathonesticus biroi (Kulczyński, 1895) — Romania
- Carpathonesticus birsteini (Charitonov, 1947) — Caucasus (Russia, Georgia)
- Carpathonesticus borutzkyi (Reimoser, 1930) — Ukraine, Turkey, Georgia
- Carpathonesticus caucasicus (Charitonov, 1947) — Georgia
- Carpathonesticus cibiniensis (Weiss, 1981) — Romania
- Carpathonesticus eriashvilii Marusik, 1987 — Ukraine, Georgia
- Carpathonesticus fodinarum (Kulczyński, 1894) (type) — Romania
- Carpathonesticus galotshkae Evtushenko, 1993 — Ukraine
- Carpathonesticus hungaricus (Chyzer, 1894) — Romania
- Carpathonesticus ljovuschkini (Pichka, 1965) — Russia (Caucasus)
- Carpathonesticus lotriensis Weiss, 1983 — Romania
- Carpathonesticus mamajevae Marusik, 1987 — Georgia
- Carpathonesticus orolesi Nae, 2013 — Romania
- Carpathonesticus paraavrigensis Weiss & Heimer, 1982 — Romania
- Carpathonesticus parvus (Kulczyński, 1914) — Bosnia-Hercegovina
- Carpathonesticus puteorum (Kulczyński, 1894) — Romania
- Carpathonesticus racovitzai (Dumitrescu, 1980) — Romania
- Carpathonesticus simoni (Fage, 1931) — Romania
- Carpathonesticus spelaeus (Szombathy, 1917) — Romania
- Carpathonesticus zaitzevi (Charitonov, 1939) — Georgia

=== Cyclocarcina ===
Cyclocarcina Komatsu, 1942

- Cyclocarcina floronoides Komatsu, 1942 (type) — Japan
  - Cyclocarcina floronoides komatsui (Yaginuma, 1979) — Japan
  - Cyclocarcina floronoides notoi (Yaginuma, 1979) — Japan
  - Cyclocarcina floronoides tatoro (Yaginuma, 1979) — Japan
- Cyclocarcina linyphoides (Komatsu, 1960) — Japan

== D ==
=== Domitius ===
Domitius Ribera, 2018

- Domitius baeticus (López-Pancorbo & Ribera, 2011) (type) — Spain
- Domitius luquei (Ribera & Guerao, 1995) — Spain
- Domitius lusitanicus (Fage, 1931) — Portugal
- Domitius menozzii (Caporiacco, 1934) — Italy
- Domitius murgis (Ribera & De Mas, 2003) — Spain
- Domitius sbordonii (Brignoli, 1979) — Italy
- Domitius speluncarum (Pavesi, 1873) — Italy

== E ==
=== Eidmannella ===
Eidmannella

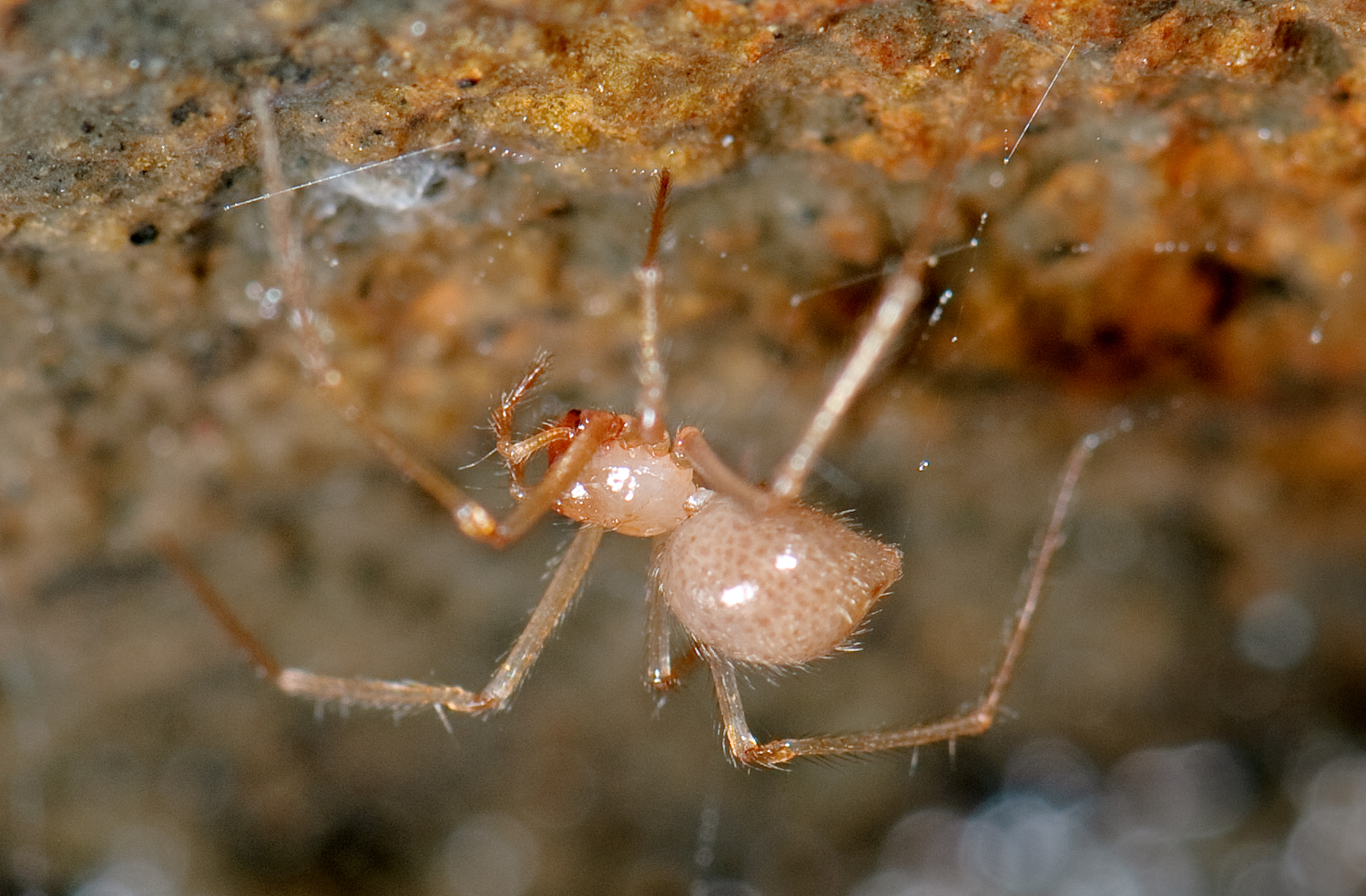
Eidmannella pallida

Eidmannella Roewer, 1935

- Eidmannella bullata Gertsch, 1984 — USA
- Eidmannella delicata Gertsch, 1984 — USA
- Eidmannella nasuta Gertsch, 1984 — USA
- Eidmannella pachona Gertsch, 1984 — Mexico
- Eidmannella pallida (Emerton, 1875) (type) — North America. Introduced to Pacific Is., Galapagos Is., Macaronesia, Spain, Japan
- Eidmannella reclusa Gertsch, 1984 — USA
- Eidmannella rostrata Gertsch, 1984 — USA
- Eidmannella tuckeri Cokendolpher & Reddell, 2001 — USA

== G ==
=== Gaucelmus ===
Gaucelmus Keyserling, 1884

- Gaucelmus augustinus Keyserling, 1884 (type) — North, Central America, Caribbean
- Gaucelmus calidus Gertsch, 1971 — Mexico, Guatemala
- Gaucelmus cavernicola (Petrunkevitch, 1910) — Jamaica
- Gaucelmus pygmaeus Gertsch, 1984 — Panama
- Gaucelmus strinatii Brignoli, 1979 — Guatemala
- Gaucelmus tropicus Gertsch, 1984 — Panama

== H ==
=== Hamus ===
Hamus Ballarin & Li, 2015

- Hamus bowoensis Ballarin & Li, 2015 (type) — Tibet
- Hamus cornutus Lin, Ballarin & Li, 2016 — China, Laos
- Hamus kangdingensis Lin, Ballarin & Li, 2016 — China
- Hamus luzon Lin, Ballarin & Li, 2016 — Philippines
- Hamus mangunensis Lin, Ballarin & Li, 2016 — China

== K ==
=== Kryptonesticus ===
Kryptonesticus

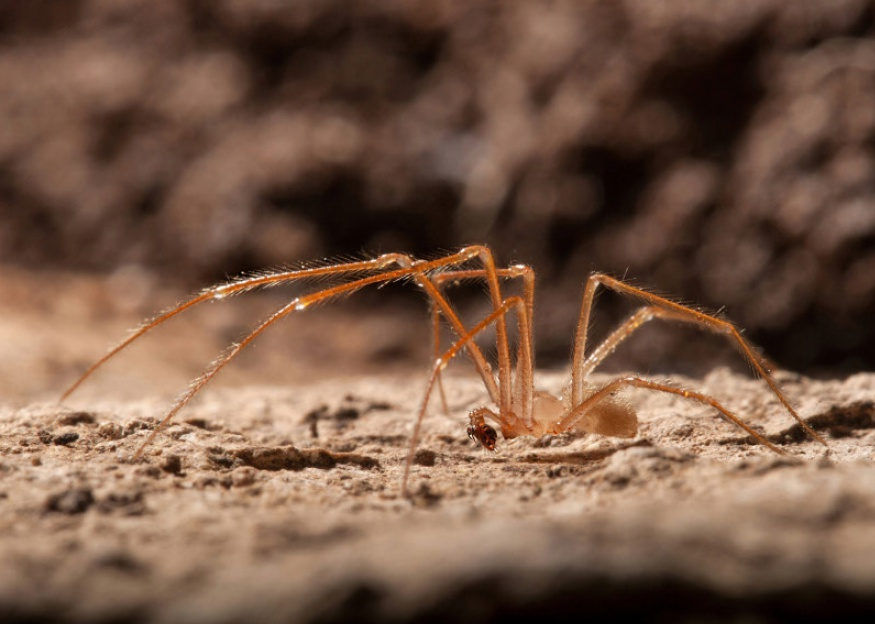
Kryptonesticus deelemanae, male

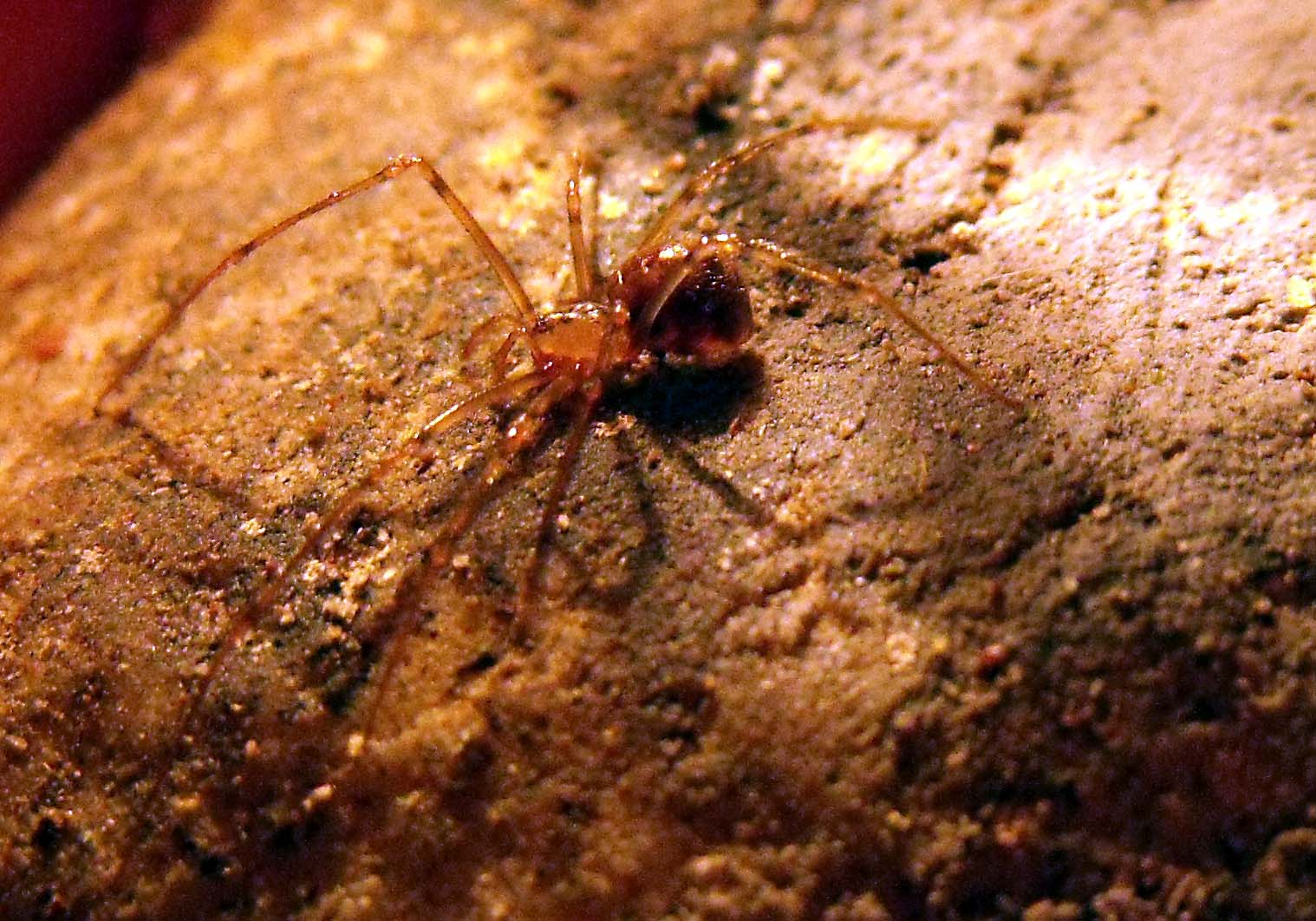
Kryptonesticus eremita

Kryptonesticus Pavlek & Ribera, 2017

- Kryptonesticus arenstorffi (Kulczyński, 1914) — Montenegro, Croatia
- Kryptonesticus beroni (Deltshev, 1977) — Bulgaria
- Kryptonesticus beshkovi (Deltshev, 1979) — Greece (Crete)
- Kryptonesticus deelemanae Pavlek & Ribera, 2017 — Croatia
- Kryptonesticus dimensis (López-Pancorbo, Kunt & Ribera, 2013) — Turkey
- Kryptonesticus eremita (Simon, 1880) — Europe, Turkey. Introduced to New Zealand
- Kryptonesticus fagei (Kratochvíl, 1933) — Bosnia and Herzegovina
- Kryptonesticus georgescuae Nae, Sarbu & Weiss, 2018 — Romania
- Kryptonesticus henderickxi (Bosselaers, 1998) — Greece (Crete)

== N ==
=== Nescina ===
Nescina Ballarin & Li, 2015

- Nescina kohi Lin, Ballarin & Li, 2016 — Singapore
- Nescina minuta Ballarin & Li, 2015 (type) — China

=== Nesticella ===
Nesticella Lehtinen & Saaristo, 1980

- Nesticella aelleni (Brignoli, 1972) — Sri Lanka
- Nesticella africana (Hubert, 1970) — Congo
- Nesticella apiculata Liu & Li, 2013 — China
- Nesticella arcuata Liu & Li, 2013 — China
- Nesticella baiseensis Lin, Ballarin & Li, 2016 — China
- Nesticella baobab Lin, Ballarin & Li, 2016 — China
- Nesticella beccus Grall & Jäger, 2016 — Laos, Thailand
- Nesticella benoiti (Hubert, 1970) — Zimbabwe
- Nesticella brevipes (Yaginuma, 1970) — Russia (Far East), China, Korea, Japan
- Nesticella buicongchieni (Lehtinen & Saaristo, 1980) — Vietnam
- Nesticella caeca Lin, Ballarin & Li, 2016 — China
- Nesticella chillagoensis Wunderlich, 1995 — Australia (Queensland)
- Nesticella chongqing Lin, Ballarin & Li, 2016 — China
- Nesticella connectens Wunderlich, 1995 — Malaysia, Thailand
- Nesticella dazhuangensis Lin, Ballarin & Li, 2016 — China
- Nesticella ducke Rodrigues & Buckup, 2007 — Brazil
- Nesticella falcata Liu & Li, 2013 — China
- Nesticella foelixi Grall & Jäger, 2016 — Laos
- Nesticella fuliangensis Lin, Ballarin & Li, 2016 — China
- Nesticella gazuida Lin, Ballarin & Li, 2016 — China
- Nesticella gongshanensis Lin, Ballarin & Li, 2016 — China
- Nesticella gracilenta Liu & Li, 2013 — China
- Nesticella griswoldi Lin, Ballarin & Li, 2016 — Madagascar
- Nesticella helenensis (Hubert, 1977) — St. Helena
- Nesticella hongheensis Lin, Ballarin & Li, 2016 — China
- Nesticella huomachongensis Lin, Ballarin & Li, 2016 — China
- Nesticella jingpo Lin, Ballarin & Li, 2016 — China
- Nesticella kaohsiungensis Lin, Ballarin & Li, 2016 — China
- Nesticella kerzhneri (Marusik, 1987) — Russia (Far East)
- Nesticella laotica Grall & Jäger, 2016 — Laos
- Nesticella lisu Lin, Ballarin & Li, 2016 — China
- Nesticella liuzhaiensis Lin, Ballarin & Li, 2016 — China
- Nesticella machadoi (Hubert, 1971) — Angola
- Nesticella marapu Benjamin, 2004 — Indonesia
- Nesticella michaliki Grall & Jäger, 2016 — Myanmar
- Nesticella mogera (Yaginuma, 1972) — China, Korea, Japan. Introduced to Azerbaijan, Europe, Pacific islands
- Nesticella mollicula (Thorell, 1898) — Myanmar, Thailand
- Nesticella murici Rodrigues & Buckup, 2007 — Brazil
- Nesticella nandanensis Lin, Ballarin & Li, 2016 — China
- Nesticella nepalensis (Hubert, 1973) (type) — India, Nepal, China
- Nesticella odonta (Chen, 1984) — China
- Nesticella okinawaensis (Yaginuma, 1979) — Japan
- Nesticella phami Lin, Ballarin & Li, 2016 — Vietnam
- Nesticella potala Lin, Ballarin & Li, 2016 — China
- Nesticella proszynskii (Lehtinen & Saaristo, 1980) — Indonesia (Java)
- Nesticella qiaoqiensis Lin, Ballarin & Li, 2016 — China
- Nesticella qiongensis Lin, Ballarin & Li, 2016 — China
- Nesticella quelpartensis (Paik & Namkung, 1969) — Korea
- Nesticella renata (Bourne, 1980) — Papua New Guinea (New Ireland)
- Nesticella robinsoni Lehtinen & Saaristo, 1980 — New Guinea
- Nesticella robusta Lin, Ballarin & Li, 2016 — China
- Nesticella rongtangensis Lin, Ballarin & Li, 2016 — China
- Nesticella sanchaheensis Lin, Ballarin & Li, 2016 — China
- Nesticella sechellana (Simon, 1898) — Seychelles
- Nesticella semicircularis Liu & Li, 2013 — China
- Nesticella shanlinensis Liu & Li, 2013 — China
- Nesticella sogi Lehtinen & Saaristo, 1980 — New Guinea
- Nesticella songi Chen & Zhu, 2004 — China
- Nesticella sulawesi Lin, Ballarin & Li, 2016 — Indonesia (Sulawesi)
- Nesticella sumatrana Lin, Ballarin & Li, 2016 — Indonesia (Sumatra)
- Nesticella taurama Lehtinen & Saaristo, 1980 — New Guinea
- Nesticella tibetana Lin, Ballarin & Li, 2016 — China
- Nesticella utuensis (Bourne, 1980) — Papua New Guinea (New Ireland)
- Nesticella vanlang Lin, Ballarin & Li, 2016 — Vietnam
- Nesticella verticalis Liu & Li, 2013 — China
- Nesticella wanzaiensis Lin, Ballarin & Li, 2016 — China
- Nesticella xiongmao Lin, Ballarin & Li, 2016 — China
- Nesticella xixia Lin, Ballarin & Li, 2016 — China
- Nesticella yanbeiensis Lin, Ballarin & Li, 2016 — China
- Nesticella yao Lin, Ballarin & Li, 2016 — China
- Nesticella yui Wunderlich & Song, 1995 — China, Laos
- Nesticella zhiyuani Lin, Ballarin & Li, 2016 — Indonesia (Sumatra)

=== Nesticus ===
Nesticus

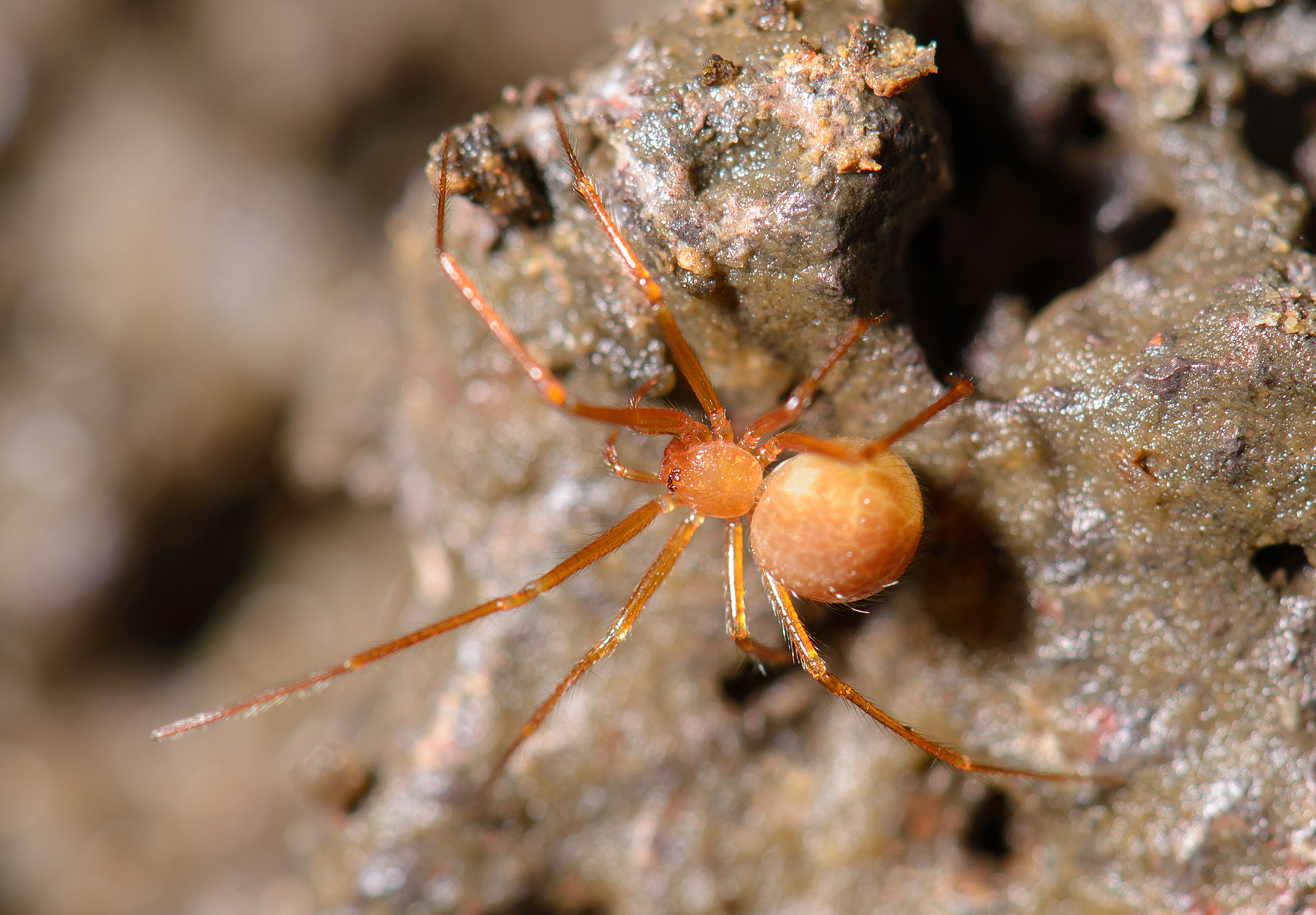
Nesticus silvestrii, female

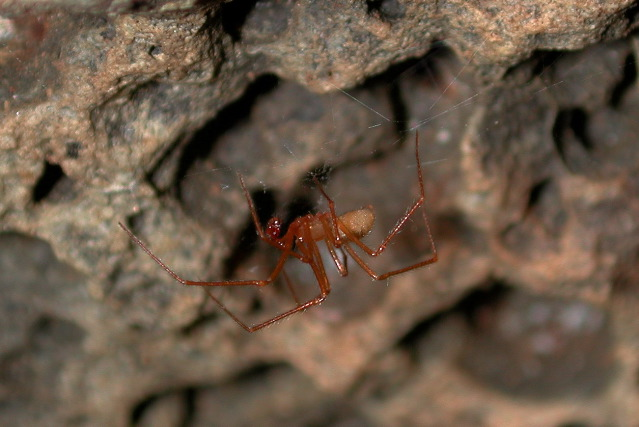
Nesticus sp, male

Nesticus Thorell, 1869

- Nesticus abukumanus Yaginuma, 1979 — Japan
- Nesticus acrituberculum Kim, Yoo, Lee, Lee, Choi & Lim, 2014 — Korea
- Nesticus afghanus Roewer, 1962 — Afghanistan
- Nesticus akamai Yaginuma, 1979 — Japan
- Nesticus akiensis Yaginuma, 1979 — Japan
- Nesticus akiyoshiensis (Uyemura, 1941) — Japan
  - Nesticus akiyoshiensis ofuku Yaginuma, 1977 — Japan
- Nesticus ambiguus Denis, 1950 — Tanzania
- Nesticus anagamianus Yaginuma, 1976 — Japan
- Nesticus antillanus Bryant, 1940 — Cuba
- Nesticus archeri Gertsch, 1984 — USA
- Nesticus arganoi Brignoli, 1972 — Mexico
- Nesticus asuwanus Nishikawa, 1986 — Japan
- Nesticus bacchus Estol & Rodrigues, 2017 — Brazil
- Nesticus balacescui Dumitrescu, 1979 — Romania
- Nesticus barri Gertsch, 1984 — USA
- Nesticus barrowsi Gertsch, 1984 — USA
- Nesticus bishopi Gertsch, 1984 — USA
- Nesticus brasiliensis Brignoli, 1979 — Brazil
- Nesticus breviscapus Yaginuma, 1979 — Japan
- Nesticus brignolii Ott & Lise, 2002 — Brazil, Uruguay, Argentina
- Nesticus brimleyi Gertsch, 1984 — USA
- Nesticus bungonus Yaginuma, 1979 — Japan
- Nesticus calilegua Ott & Lise, 2002 — Brazil, Argentina
- Nesticus campus Gertsch, 1984 — Mexico
- Nesticus carolinensis (Bishop, 1950) — USA
- Nesticus carpaticus Dumitrescu, 1979 — Romania
- Nesticus carteri Emerton, 1875 — USA
- Nesticus caverna Gertsch, 1984 — Mexico
- Nesticus cellulanus (Clerck, 1757) (type) — Europe, Turkey. Introduced to North America
  - Nesticus cellulanus affinis Kulczyński, 1894 — Hungary
- Nesticus cernensis Dumitrescu, 1979 — Romania
- Nesticus chikunii Yaginuma, 1980 — Japan
- Nesticus citrinus (Taczanowski, 1874) — French Guiana
- Nesticus concolor Roewer, 1962 — Afghanistan
- Nesticus constantinescui Dumitrescu, 1979 — Romania
- Nesticus cooperi Gertsch, 1984 — USA
- Nesticus coreanus Paik & Namkung, 1969 — Korea
- Nesticus crosbyi Gertsch, 1984 — USA
- Nesticus delfini (Simon, 1904) — Chile
- Nesticus diaconui Dumitrescu, 1979 — Romania
- Nesticus dilutus Gertsch, 1984 — USA
- Nesticus echigonus Yaginuma, 1986 — Japan
- Nesticus flavidus Paik, 1978 — Korea
- Nesticus furenensis Yaginuma, 1979 — Japan
- Nesticus furtivus Gertsch, 1984 — USA
- Nesticus gastropodus Kim & Ye, 2014 — Korea
- Nesticus georgia Gertsch, 1984 — USA
- Nesticus gertschi Coyle & McGarity, 1992 — USA
- Nesticus gondai Yaginuma, 1979 — Japan
- Nesticus gujoensis Yaginuma, 1979 — Japan
- Nesticus higoensis Yaginuma, 1977 — Japan
- Nesticus hoffmanni Gertsch, 1971 — Mexico
- Nesticus holsingeri Gertsch, 1984 — USA
- Nesticus inconcinnus Simon, 1907 — São Tomé and Príncipe
- Nesticus ionescui Dumitrescu, 1979 — Romania
- Nesticus iriei Yaginuma, 1979 — Japan
- Nesticus ivone Faleiro & Santos, 2011 — Brazil
- Nesticus iwatensis Yaginuma, 1979 — Japan
- Nesticus jamesoni Gertsch, 1984 — Mexico
- Nesticus jonesi Gertsch, 1984 — USA
- Nesticus kaiensis Yaginuma, 1979 — Japan
- Nesticus karyuensis Yaginuma, 1980 — Japan
- Nesticus kataokai Yaginuma, 1979 — Japan
- Nesticus kunisakiensis Irie, 1999 — Japan
- Nesticus kuriko Yaginuma, 1972 — Japan
- Nesticus kyongkeomsanensis Namkung, 2002 — Korea
- Nesticus latiscapus Yaginuma, 1972 — Japan
  - Nesticus latiscapus kosodensis Yaginuma, 1972 — Japan
- Nesticus lindbergi Roewer, 1962 — Afghanistan
- Nesticus longiscapus Yaginuma, 1976 — Japan
  - Nesticus longiscapus awa Yaginuma, 1978 — Japan
  - Nesticus longiscapus draco Yaginuma, 1978 — Japan
  - Nesticus longiscapus kiuchii Yaginuma, 1978 — Japan
- Nesticus maculatus Bryant, 1948 — Hispaniola
- Nesticus masudai Yaginuma, 1979 — Japan
- Nesticus mikawanus Yaginuma, 1979 — Japan
- Nesticus mimus Gertsch, 1984 — USA
- Nesticus monticola Yaginuma, 1979 — Japan
- Nesticus nahuanus Gertsch, 1971 — Mexico
- Nesticus nasicus Coyle & McGarity, 1992 — USA
- Nesticus nishikawai Yaginuma, 1979 — Japan
- Nesticus noroensis Mashibara, 1993 — Japan
- Nesticus orghidani Dumitrescu, 1979 — Romania
- Nesticus paynei Gertsch, 1984 — USA
- Nesticus pecki Hedin & Dellinger, 2005 — USA
- Nesticus plesai Dumitrescu, 1980 — Romania
- Nesticus potreiro Ott & Lise, 2002 — Brazil
- Nesticus potterius (Chamberlin, 1933) — USA
- Nesticus rainesi Gertsch, 1984 — Mexico
- Nesticus rakanus Yaginuma, 1976 — Japan
- Nesticus ramirezi Ott & Lise, 2002 — Brazil, Argentina
- Nesticus reclusus Gertsch, 1984 — USA
- Nesticus reddelli Gertsch, 1984 — Mexico
- Nesticus salta Torres, Pardo, González-Reyes, Rodríguez Artigas & Corronca, 2016 — Argentina
- Nesticus secretus Gertsch, 1984 — USA
- Nesticus sedatus Gertsch, 1984 — Mexico
- Nesticus sheari Gertsch, 1984 — USA
- Nesticus shinkaii Yaginuma, 1979 — Japan
- Nesticus shureiensis Yaginuma, 1980 — Japan
- Nesticus silvanus Gertsch, 1984 — USA
- Nesticus silvestrii Fage, 1929 — USA
- Nesticus sodanus Gertsch, 1984 — USA
- Nesticus sonei Yaginuma, 1981 — Japan
- Nesticus stupkai Gertsch, 1984 — USA
- Nesticus stygius Gertsch, 1984 — USA
- Nesticus suzuka Yaginuma, 1979 — Japan
- Nesticus taim Ott & Lise, 2002 — Brazil
- Nesticus takachiho Yaginuma, 1979 — Japan
- Nesticus tarumii Yaginuma, 1979 — Japan
- Nesticus tennesseensis (Petrunkevitch, 1925) — USA
- Nesticus tosa Yaginuma, 1976 — Japan
  - Nesticus tosa iwaya Yaginuma, 1976 — Japan
  - Nesticus tosa niyodo Yaginuma, 1976 — Japan
- Nesticus unicolor Simon, 1895 — Venezuela
- Nesticus utatsuensis Tanikawa & Yawata, 2013 — Japan
- Nesticus vazquezae Gertsch, 1971 — Mexico
- Nesticus wiehlei Dumitrescu, 1979 — Romania
- Nesticus yaginumai Irie, 1987 — Japan
- Nesticus yamagatensis Yoshida, 1989 — Japan
- Nesticus yamato Yaginuma, 1979 — Japan
- Nesticus yeongchigulensis Kim, Ye & Kim, 2016 — Korea
- Nesticus yesoensis Yaginuma, 1979 — Japan
- Nesticus zenjoensis Yaginuma, 1978 — Japan

== P ==
=== Pseudonesticus ===
Pseudonesticus Liu & Li, 2013

- Pseudonesticus clavatus Liu & Li, 2013 (type) — China
- Pseudonesticus dafangensis Lin, Ballarin & Li, 2016 — China
- Pseudonesticus miao Lin, Ballarin & Li, 2016 — China
- Pseudonesticus spinosus Lin, Ballarin & Li, 2016 — China
- Pseudonesticus wumengensis Lin, Ballarin & Li, 2016 — China
- Pseudonesticus ziyunensis Lin, Ballarin & Li, 2016 — China

== S ==
=== Speleoticus ===
Speleoticus Ballarin & Li, 2016

- Speleoticus globosus (Liu & Li, 2013) — China
- Speleoticus libo (Chen & Zhu, 2005) — China
- Speleoticus navicellatus (Liu & Li, 2013) (type) — China
- Speleoticus uenoi (Yaginuma, 1972) — Japan
- Speleoticus yinchangminae Li, 2016 — China

== T ==
=== Typhlonesticus ===
Typhlonesticus

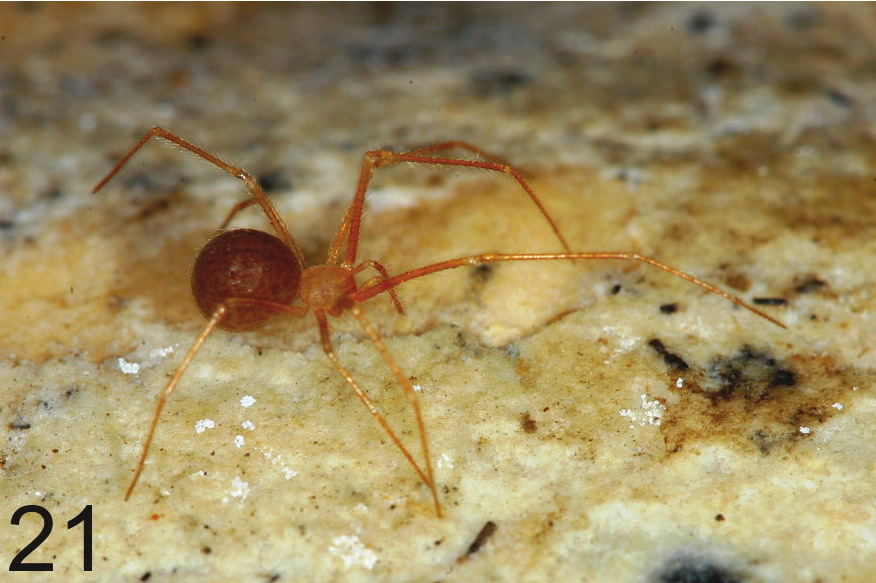
Typhlonesticus gocmeni, female

Typhlonesticus Kulczyński, 1914

- Typhlonesticus absoloni (Kratochvíl, 1933) (type) — Montenegro
- Typhlonesticus gocmeni Ribera, Elverici, Kunt & Özkütük, 2014 — Turkey
- Typhlonesticus idriacus (Roewer, 1931) — Austria, Italy
- Typhlonesticus morisii (Brignoli, 1975) — Italy
- Typhlonesticus obcaecatus (Simon, 1907) — Spain

== W ==
=== Wraios ===
Wraios Ballarin & Li, 2015

- Wraios longiembolus Ballarin & Li, 2015 (type) — China
