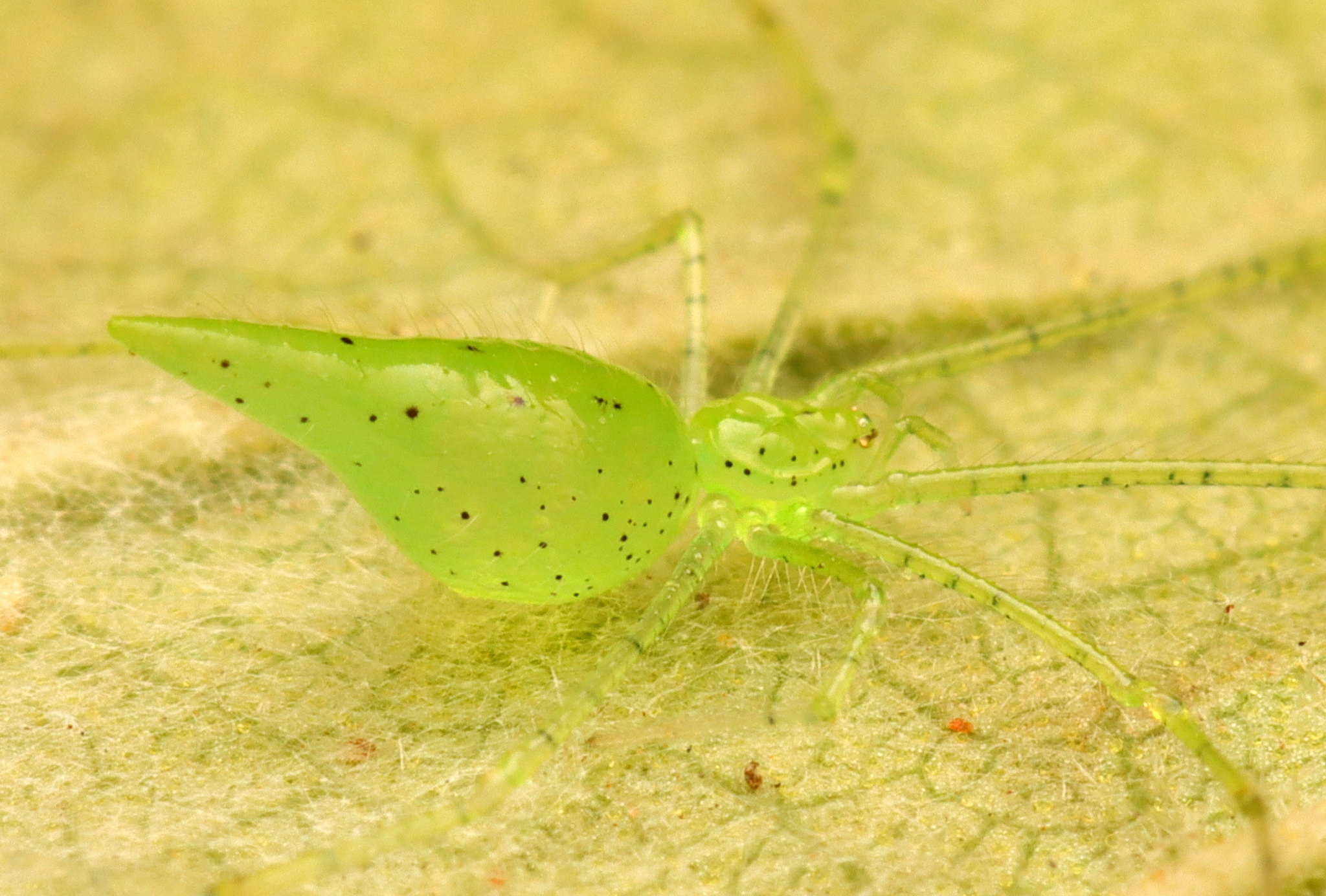
- Synotaxid in South Africa
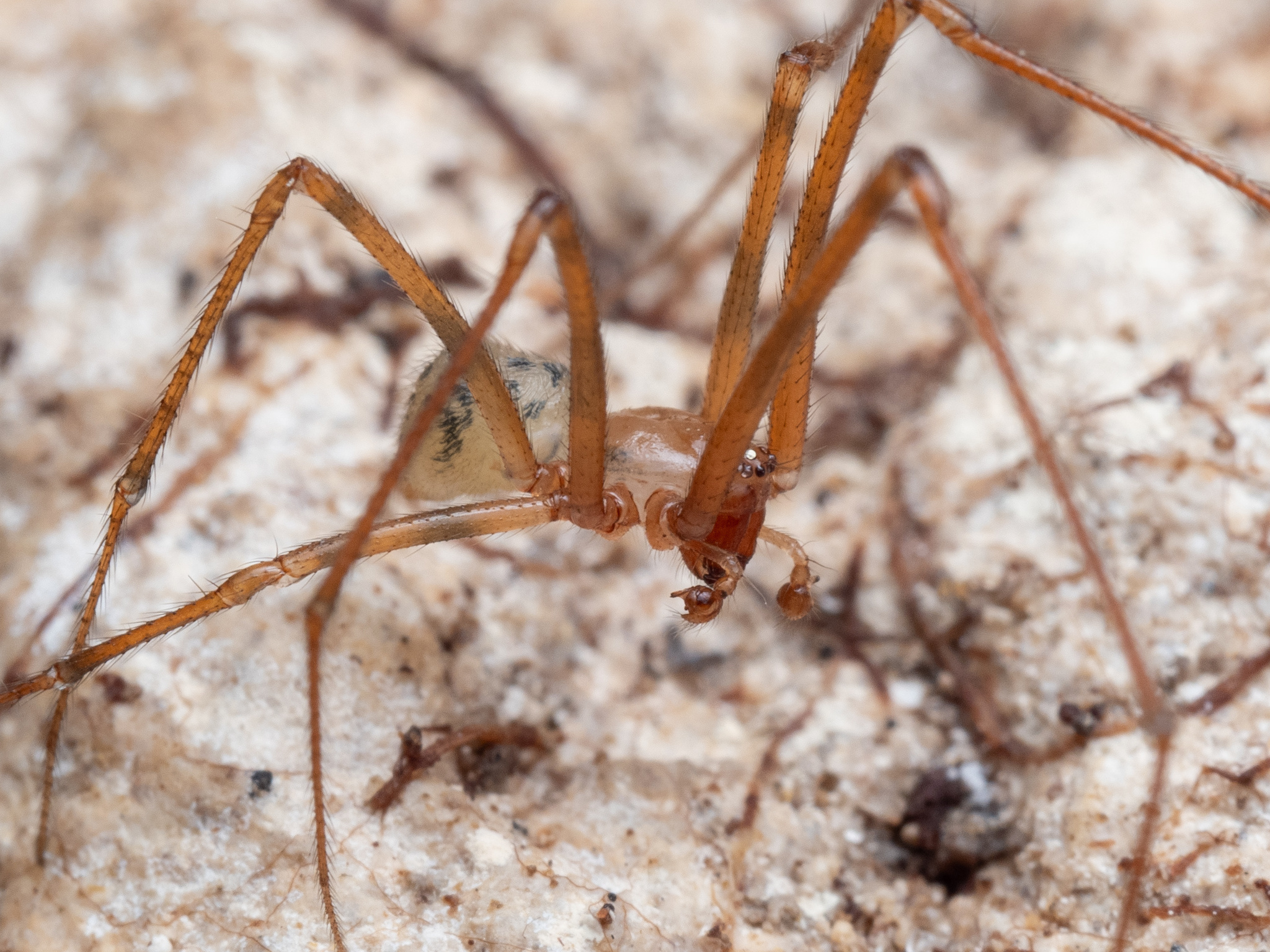
- Gaucelmus augustinus in California

Scientific classification
- Kingdom: Animalia
- Phylum: Arthropoda
- Subphylum: Chelicerata
- Class: Arachnida
- Order: Araneae
- Infraorder: Araneomorphae
- Family: Synotaxidae; Simon, 1895

Diversity
- 5 genera, 40 species
- blue: reported countries (WSC)

= Synotaxidae =

Synotaxidae Temporal range: Palaeogene–present

Family of spiders

Synotaxidae is a family of spiders with forty described species in five genera. It was first described by Eugène Simon in 1895.

== Genera ==
As of January 2026, this family includes five genera and forty species:

- Gaucelmus Keyserling, 1884 – Jamaica, Guatemala, Panama, Mexico, North America
- Hamus Ballarin & Li, 2015 – China, Laos, Philippines
- Nescina Ballarin & Li, 2015 – China, Singapore
- Synotaxus Simon, 1895 – Trinidad, South America
- Tekellina Levi, 1957 – China, Japan, Russia, Mexico, United States, South America
