= Ivesia =

Ivesia may refer to two different genera:

- Ivesia Blume, a taxonomic synonym for the spider genus Nesticus
- Ivesia Decne., a taxonomic synonym for the plant genus Potentilla
