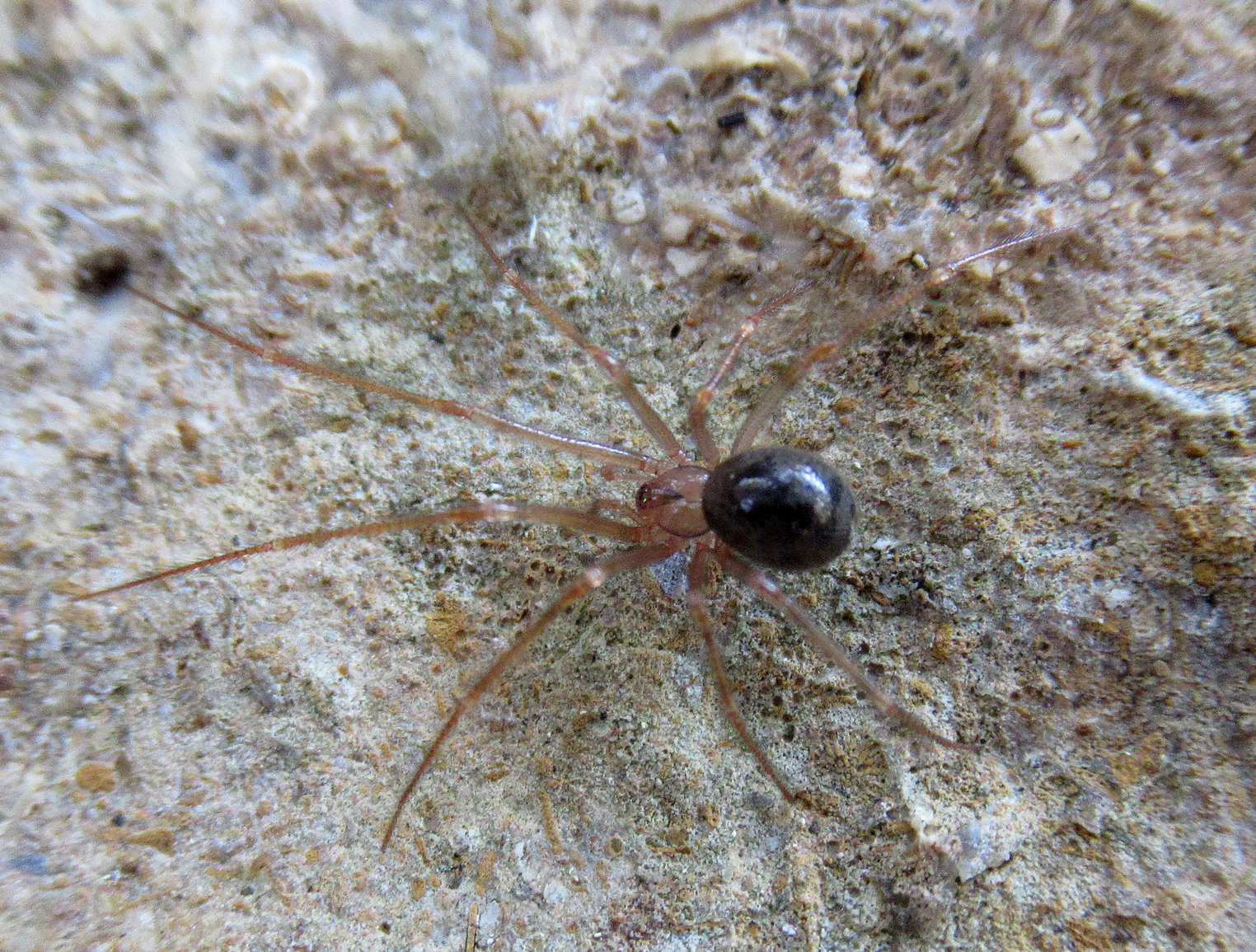
- female D. dzhamirzoevi in Dagestan

Scientific classification
- Kingdom: Animalia
- Phylum: Arthropoda
- Subphylum: Chelicerata
- Class: Arachnida
- Order: Araneae
- Infraorder: Araneomorphae
- Family: Nesticidae
- Genus: Daginesticus; Fomichev, Ballarin & Marusik, 2022

Type species
- D. dzhamirzoevi Fomichev, Ballarin & Marusik, 2022

Species
- 2, see text

= Daginesticus =

Genus of spiders

Daginesticus is a genus of spiders in the family Nesticidae.

== Distribution ==
Daginesticus is found in the Caucasus region, with records from Dagestan and Georgia.

== Etymology ==
The genus is named after its type locality Dagestan, in combination with Nesticus, indicating the relationship. D. dzhamirzoevi is named in honor of Gadzhibek S. Dzhamirzoev, who organized the expedition where the species was first found. D. mamajevae is named for O. V. Mamaeva (О. В. Мамаева).

== Species ==
As of January 2026, this genus includes two species:

- Daginesticus dzhamirzoevi Fomichev, Ballarin & Marusik, 2022 – Russia (Caucasus)
- Daginesticus mamajevae (Marusik, 1987) – Georgia
