= Aituaria =

Scientific classification
- Domain: Eukaryota
- Kingdom: Animalia
- Phylum: Arthropoda
- Subphylum: Chelicerata
- Class: Arachnida
- Order: Araneae
- Infraorder: Araneomorphae
- Family: Nesticidae
- Genus: Aituaria; Efimik

Species
- Aituaria nataliae Esyunin & Efimik, 1998; Aituaria pontica (Spassky, 1932)

Genus of spiders

Aituaria is a genus of spiders in the family Nesticidae. It was first described in 1998 by Esyunin & Efimik. As of 2016, it contains two species, Aituaria nataliae and Aituaria pontica, the latter of which was transferred from Nesticus first to Carpathonesticus, then to Aituaria.
