= Aituaria nataliae =

Scientific classification
- Kingdom: Animalia
- Phylum: Arthropoda
- Subphylum: Chelicerata
- Class: Arachnida
- Order: Araneae
- Infraorder: Araneomorphae
- Family: Nesticidae
- Genus: Aituaria
- Species: A. nataliae

Binomial name
- Aituaria nataliae Esyunin & Efimik, 1998

Species of spider

Aituaria nataliae is the type species of Aituaria, a genus of araneomorph spiders of the family Nesticidae. It occurs in the steppes of the southern Urals.

== Original publication ==
- Esyunin, S.L.; Efimik, V.E. (1998). "Remarks on the Ural spider fauna, 8. New and unidentified species from steppe landscapes of the South Urals (Arachnida: Aranei)". Arthropoda Selecta. 7 (2): 145–152.
