= Carpathonesticus paraavrigensis =

Scientific classification
- Kingdom: Animalia
- Phylum: Arthropoda
- Subphylum: Chelicerata
- Class: Arachnida
- Order: Araneae
- Infraorder: Araneomorphae
- Family: Nesticidae
- Genus: Carpathonesticus
- Species: C. paraavrigensis

Binomial name
- Carpathonesticus paraavrigensis Weiss & Heimer, 1982

Species of spider

Carpathonesticus paraavrigensis is a species of araneomorph spider of the family Nesticidae. It occurs in Romania, where it was discovered in a narrow gorge, on the overhanging side.

== Description ==
No male specimens have yet been described. Female specimens resemble Carpathonesticus avrigensis, from which it can be distinguished by the epigyne. The colouring and patterning are similar to those of other Carpathonesticus species. The prosoma has a length of 2.6 mm; the full body-length is 6.2 mm.

== Original publication ==
- Weiss, I.; Heimer, S. (1982). "Zwei neue Carpathonesticus-Arten aus Rumänien nebst Betrachtungen über Kopulationsmechanismen und deren Evolution (Arachnida, Araneae, Nesticidae)". Reichenbachia. 20: 167–174.
