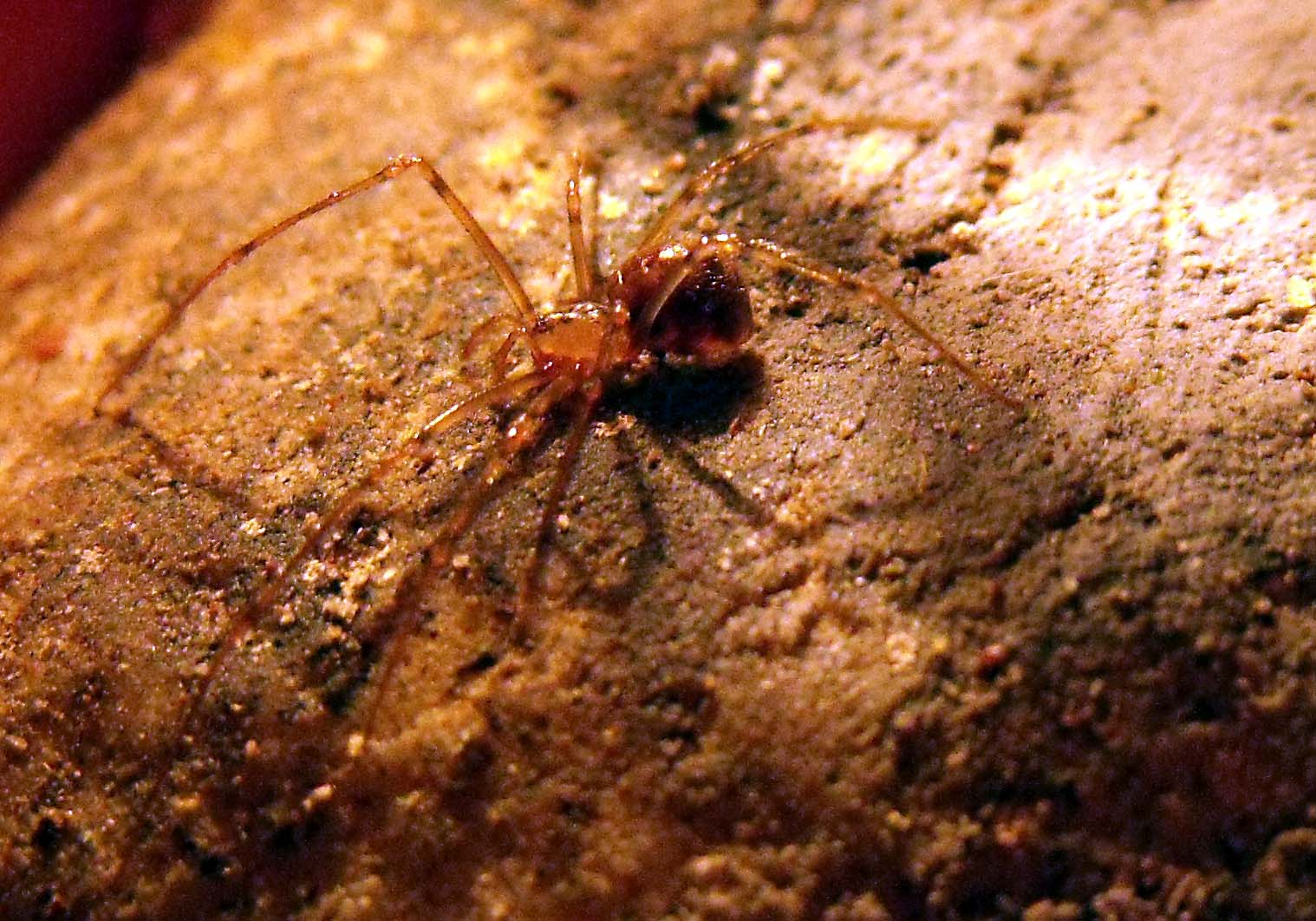
- K. eremita

Scientific classification
- Kingdom: Animalia
- Phylum: Arthropoda
- Subphylum: Chelicerata
- Class: Arachnida
- Order: Araneae
- Infraorder: Araneomorphae
- Family: Nesticidae
- Genus: Kryptonesticus; Pavlek & Ribera, 2017

Type species
- Kryptonesticus deelemanae Pavlek & Ribera, 2017

Species
- Nine, see text for list.

= Kryptonesticus =

Genus of spiders

Kryptonesticus is a genus of European scaffold web spiders first described by Pavlek & Ribera in 2017, based around the newly described type species Kryptonesticus deelemanae and seven species transferred from genus Nesticus. In 2018, an additional species, K. georgescuae, was described from two female specimens from Romania.

With the exception of K. eremita, individual species have very restricted ranges.

== Species ==
Kryptonesticus comprises the following species, per the World Spider Catalog:

- Kryptonesticus arenstorffi (Kulczyński, 1914) — Bosnia-Hercegovina
- Kryptonesticus beroni (Deltshev, 1977) — Bulgaria
- Kryptonesticus beshkovi (Deltshev, 1979) — Crete
- Kryptonesticus deelemanae Pavlek & Ribera, 2017 — Croatia
- Kryptonesticus dimensis (López-Pancorbo, Kunt & Ribera, 2013) — Turkey
- Kryptonesticus eremita (Simon, 1879) — Europe; introduced in New Zealand
- Kryptonesticus fagei (Kratochvíl, 1933) — Italy, Montenegro
- Kryptonesticus georgescuae Nae et al., 2018 — Romania
- Kryptonesticus henderickxi (Bosselaers, 1998) — Crete
