= Carpathonesticus orolesi =

Scientific classification
- Kingdom: Animalia
- Phylum: Arthropoda
- Subphylum: Chelicerata
- Class: Arachnida
- Order: Araneae
- Infraorder: Araneomorphae
- Family: Nesticidae
- Genus: Carpathonesticus
- Species: C. orolesi

Binomial name
- Carpathonesticus orolesi Nae, 2013

Species of spider

Carpathonesticus orolesi is an araneomorph spider species of the family Nesticidae named after the Dacian king Oroles. It occurs in the Romanian Carpathians.

== Original publication ==
Nae, A. (2013). "Carpathonesticus orolesi n. sp. from the Carpathians (Araneae, Nesticidae)". Travaux de l'Institut de Spéologie "Émile Racovitza". 52: 27–32.
