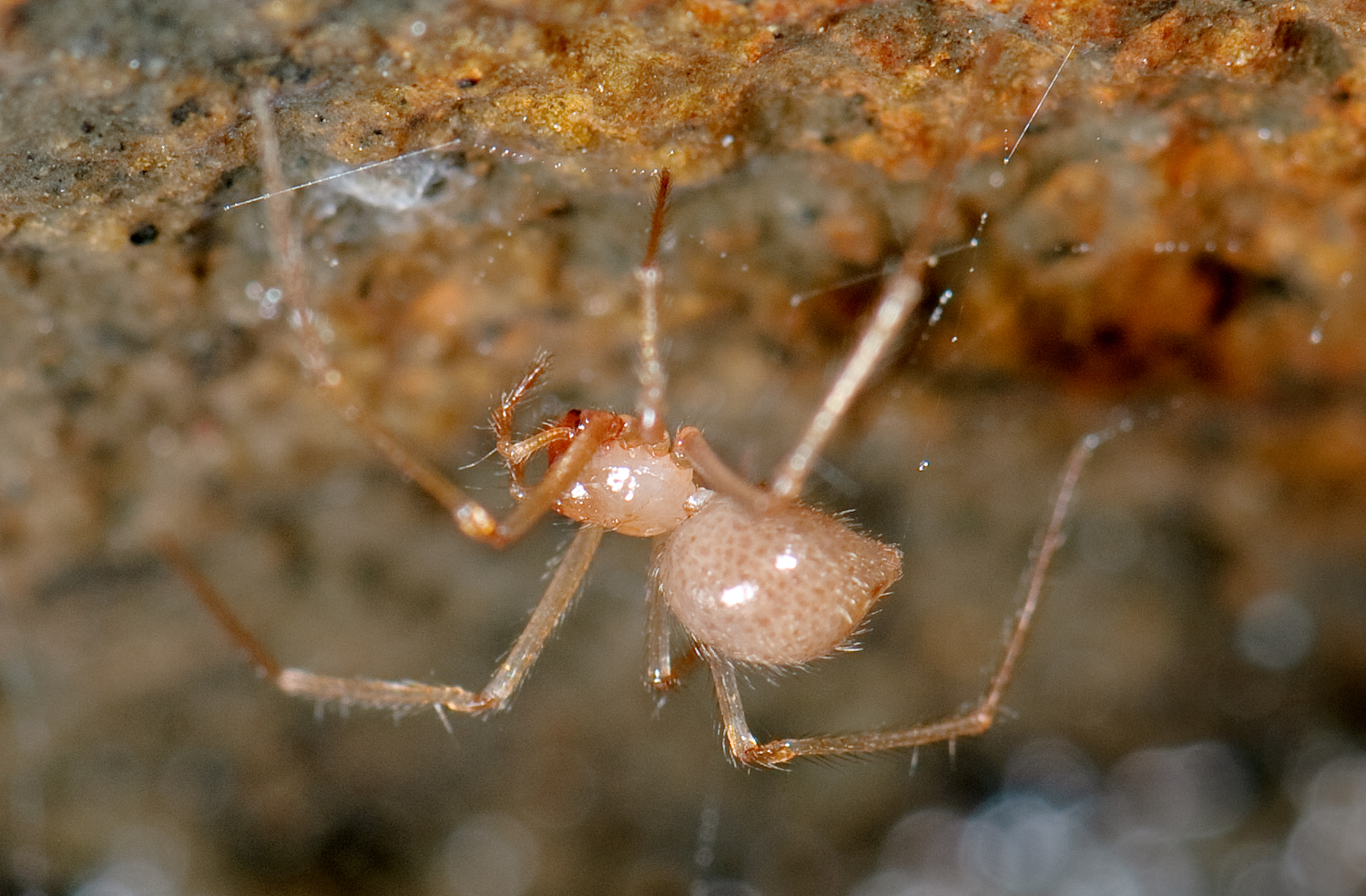

Scientific classification
- Domain: Eukaryota
- Kingdom: Animalia
- Phylum: Arthropoda
- Subphylum: Chelicerata
- Class: Arachnida
- Order: Araneae
- Infraorder: Araneomorphae
- Family: Nesticidae
- Genus: Eidmannella
- Species: E. pallida

Binomial name
- Eidmannella pallida (Emerton, 1875)

= Eidmannella pallida =

Species of spider

Eidmannella pallida is a species of true spider in the family Nesticidae. It is found in North America, has been introduced into Pacific Islands, Galapagos Islands, Macaronesia, Spain, and Japan.
