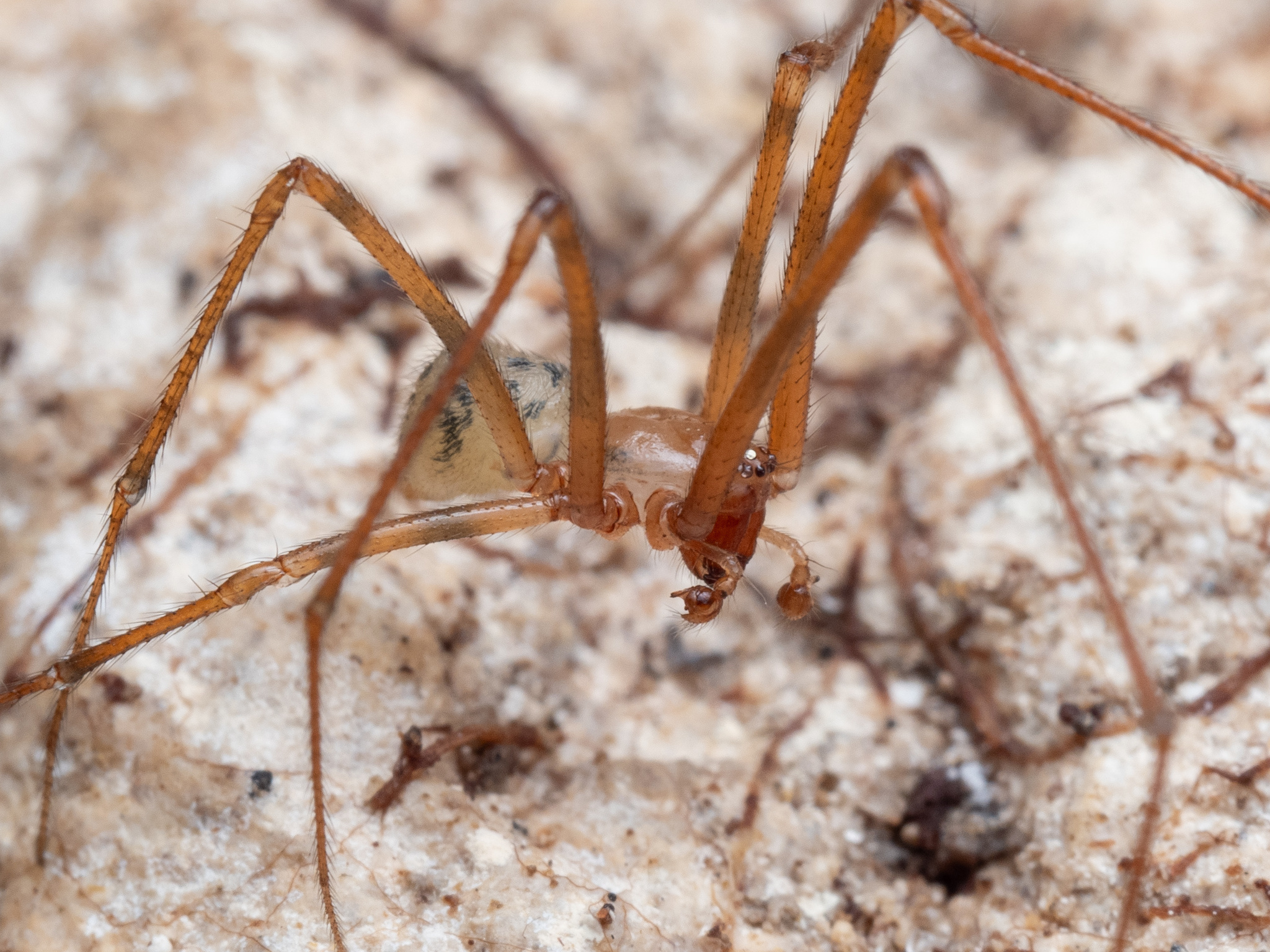
- G. augustinus in California

Scientific classification
- Kingdom: Animalia
- Phylum: Arthropoda
- Subphylum: Chelicerata
- Class: Arachnida
- Order: Araneae
- Infraorder: Araneomorphae
- Family: Synotaxidae
- Genus: Gaucelmus; Keyserling, 1884

Type species
- Gaucelmus augustinus

Species
- 6, see text

= Gaucelmus =

Genus of spiders

Gaucelmus is a genus of spiders in the family Nesticidae with six described species. It was first described in 1884 by Eugen von Keyserling.

== Species ==
As of January 2026, this genus includes six species:

- Gaucelmus augustinus Keyserling, 1884 – North, Central America, Caribbean
- Gaucelmus calidus Gertsch, 1971 – Mexico, Guatemala
- Gaucelmus cavernicola (Petrunkevitch, 1910) – Jamaica
- Gaucelmus pygmaeus Gertsch, 1984 – Panama
- Gaucelmus strinatii Brignoli, 1979 – Guatemala
- Gaucelmus tropicus Gertsch, 1984 – Panama
