= Carpathonesticus ljovuschkini =

Scientific classification
- Kingdom: Animalia
- Phylum: Arthropoda
- Subphylum: Chelicerata
- Class: Arachnida
- Order: Araneae
- Infraorder: Araneomorphae
- Family: Nesticidae
- Genus: Carpathonesticus
- Species: C. ljovuschkini

Binomial name
- Carpathonesticus ljovuschkini (Pichka, 1965)

Synonyms
- Nesticus ljovuschkini Pichka, 1965

Species of spider

Carpathonesticus ljovuschkini is a species of araneomorph spider of the family Nesticidae. It occurs in the Russian Caucasus. No male specimens have yet been described.

== Description ==
The prosoma is 1.63 mm long and 1.45 mm wide in the described female.

== Original publication ==
Pichka, V. E. (1965). "On the spider fauna of the caves in the west Transcaucasia". Zoologicheskiĭ Zhurnal. 44: 1190–1196.
