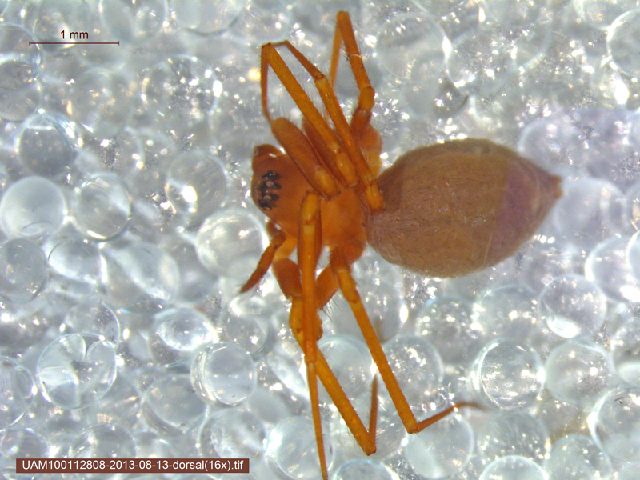

Scientific classification
- Kingdom: Animalia
- Phylum: Arthropoda
- Subphylum: Chelicerata
- Class: Arachnida
- Order: Araneae
- Infraorder: Araneomorphae
- Family: Nesticidae
- Genus: Nesticus
- Species: N. silvestrii

Binomial name
- Nesticus silvestrii Fage, 1929

= Nesticus silvestrii =

Species of spider

Nesticus silvestrii is a scaffold web spiders species in the family Nesticidae. It is found in western North America, from British Columbia (Canada) to California (the United States).
