= Nesticus constantinescui =

Scientific classification
- Kingdom: Animalia
- Phylum: Arthropoda
- Subphylum: Chelicerata
- Class: Arachnida
- Order: Araneae
- Infraorder: Araneomorphae
- Family: Nesticidae
- Genus: Nesticus
- Species: N. constantinescui

Binomial name
- Nesticus constantinescui Dumitrescu, 1979

Species of spider

Nesticus constantinescui is a species of araneomorph spider of the family Nesticidae. It is endemic to Romania.

== Original publication ==
- Margareta Dumitrescu (1979). "La monographie des représentants du genre Nesticus des grottes de Roumanie, IIe note". Travaux de l'Institut de Spéologie Emile Racovitza (in French). 19: 77–101.
