= Carpathonesticus hungaricus =

Scientific classification
- Kingdom: Animalia
- Phylum: Arthropoda
- Subphylum: Chelicerata
- Class: Arachnida
- Order: Araneae
- Infraorder: Araneomorphae
- Family: Nesticidae
- Genus: Carpathonesticus
- Species: C. hungaricus

Binomial name
- Carpathonesticus hungaricus (Chyzer, 1894)

Synonyms
- Nesticus hungaricus Chyzer, 1894

Species of spider

Carpathonesticus hungaricus is a species of araneomorph spider of the family Nesticidae. It occurs in Romania, where it inhabits caves.

== Description ==
Females have a pale yellowish prosoma with a blackish pattern that in some specimens is absent, and the sternum and appendages are a pale, reddish yellow. The prosoma has a length of 1.6–2.2 mm (1.9 mm in males). The opisthosoma is grey with a blackish pattern that is absent in some specimens.

== Original publication ==
Chyzer, C.; Kulczyński, W. (1894). Araneae Hungariae II. Budapest: Academiae Scientarum Hungaricae.
