= Howaia =

Scientific classification
- Kingdom: Animalia
- Phylum: Arthropoda
- Subphylum: Chelicerata
- Class: Arachnida
- Order: Araneae
- Infraorder: Araneomorphae
- Family: Nesticidae
- Genus: Howaia; Lehtinen & Saaristo, 1980

Type species
- Nesticus mogera Yaginuma, 1972

Species
- 10, see text

Genus of spiders

Howaia is a genus of spiders in the family Nesticidae.

== Distribution ==
Howaia is found in China, Korea, and Japan.

== Taxonomy ==
The genus was reinstated by Sherwood et al. in 2023.

== Species ==
As of January 2026, this genus includes ten species:

- Howaia alba Ballarin & Eguchi, 2023 – Japan (Ryukyu Islands)
- Howaia apiculata (Liu & Li, 2013) – China
- Howaia fuliangensis (Lin, Ballarin & Li, 2016) – China
- Howaia huomachongensis (Lin, Ballarin & Li, 2016) – China
- Howaia mogera (Yaginuma, 1972) – China, Korea, Japan. Introduced to St. Helena, Europe, Azerbaijan, Pacific islands
- Howaia rongtangensis (Lin, Ballarin & Li, 2016) – China
- Howaia subterranea Ballarin & Eguchi, 2023 – Japan (Ryukyu Islands)
- Howaia wanzaiensis (Lin, Ballarin & Li, 2016) – China
- Howaia yanbeiensis (Lin, Ballarin & Li, 2016) – China
- Howaia yintiaoling (Wang, Zheng & Zhang, 2022) – China
