= Domitius baeticus =

Scientific classification
- Kingdom: Animalia
- Phylum: Arthropoda
- Subphylum: Chelicerata
- Class: Arachnida
- Order: Araneae
- Infraorder: Araneomorphae
- Family: Nesticidae
- Genus: Domitius
- Species: D. baeticus

Binomial name
- Domitius baeticus (López-Pancorbo & Ribera, 2011)

Synonyms
- Nesticus baeticus López-Pancorbo & Ribera, 2011

Scaffold web spider species

Domitius beaticus is an araneomorph spider species of the family Nesticidae. It is known to occur in Spain. The species is troglobitic, occurring solely in caves.

The species was first described in 2011 by Alberto López-Pancorbo and Carles Ribera as Nesticus baeticus. In 2018, it was transferred by Carles Ribera, alongside six other species, to the new genus Domitius.

== Description ==
Both sexes are yellowish with exception of the opisthosoma, which is greyish with darker patches. Male body length 6.4 mm; female body length 6.3 mm.

== Original publication ==
López-Pancorbo, Alberto; Ribera, Carles (2011). "Nesticus baeticus sp. n., a new troglobitic spider species from south-west Europe (Araneae, Nesticidae)". ZooKeys (89): 1–13.
