= Synotaxus =

Synotaxus Temporal range: Palaeogene– Present

Scientific classification
- Kingdom: Animalia
- Phylum: Arthropoda
- Subphylum: Chelicerata
- Class: Arachnida
- Order: Araneae
- Infraorder: Araneomorphae
- Family: Synotaxidae
- Genus: Synotaxus; Simon, 1895

Type species
- S. turbinatus Simon, 1895

Species
- 11, see text

Genus of spiders

Synotaxus is a genus of araneomorph spiders in the family Synotaxidae that was first described by Eugène Louis Simon in 1895. Originally placed with the tangle web spiders, it was moved to the family Synotaxidae in 2017.

== Description ==
Spiders in this genus have a long, green abdomen, which extends to varying degrees beyond the spinnerets. The carapace is wide and flat, and they have long, delicate legs with the first being the longest. The legs and body are both covered in long, fine setae.

The posterior lateral spinnerets bear enlarged aggregate gland spigots, and the male pedipalp has a stout patellar spur. The palpal femur, patella and tibia bear strong, often greatly enlarged, macrosetae.

== Species ==
As of September 2019 it contains eleven species, found in South America, Panama, Costa Rica, and on Trinidad:

- Synotaxus bonaldoi Santos & Rheims, 2005 – Brazil
- Synotaxus brescoviti Santos & Rheims, 2005 – Brazil
- Synotaxus ecuadorensis Exline, 1950 – Costa Rica to Ecuador
- Synotaxus itabaiana Santos & Rheims, 2005 – Brazil
- Synotaxus jaraguari Souza, Brescovit & Araujo, 2017 – Brazil
- Synotaxus leticia Exline & Levi, 1965 – Colombia
- Synotaxus longicaudatus (Keyserling, 1891) – Brazil
- Synotaxus monoceros (Caporiacco, 1947) – Trinidad, Guyana, Brazil
- Synotaxus siolii Santos & Rheims, 2005 – Brazil
- Synotaxus turbinatus Simon, 1895 (type) – Panama to Ecuador
- Synotaxus waiwai Agnarsson, 2003 – Guyana, Brazil, Paraguay

== Habitat and Distribution ==
Spiders in this genus are found in the understory of wet forests in South America, where they construct their webs between the leaves of trees or bushes, well above the forest floor.
