= Nesticus nasicus =

Scientific classification
- Domain: Eukaryota
- Kingdom: Animalia
- Phylum: Arthropoda
- Subphylum: Chelicerata
- Class: Arachnida
- Order: Araneae
- Infraorder: Araneomorphae
- Family: Nesticidae
- Genus: Nesticus
- Species: N. nasicus

Binomial name
- Nesticus nasicus Coyle & McGarity, 1992

Species of spider

Nesticus nasicus is a species of cave cobweb spider in the family Nesticidae. It is found in the United States.
