= Carpathonesticus eriashvilii =

Scientific classification
- Kingdom: Animalia
- Phylum: Arthropoda
- Subphylum: Chelicerata
- Class: Arachnida
- Order: Araneae
- Infraorder: Araneomorphae
- Family: Nesticidae
- Genus: Carpathonesticus
- Species: C. eriashvilii

Binomial name
- Carpathonesticus eriashvilii Marusik, 1987

Species of spider

Carpathonesticus eriashvilii is an araneomorph spider species of the family Nesticidae. It occurs in Georgia, in the Lagodekhi Nature Reserve.

== Original publication ==
Marusik, Y.M. (1987). "Three new species of the family Nesticidae (Aranei) from the fauna of the USSR". Zoologicheskiĭ Zhurnal. 66 (3): 461–463.
