= Carpathonesticus caucasicus =

Scientific classification
- Kingdom: Animalia
- Phylum: Arthropoda
- Subphylum: Chelicerata
- Class: Arachnida
- Order: Araneae
- Infraorder: Araneomorphae
- Family: Nesticidae
- Genus: Carpathonesticus
- Species: C. caucasicus

Binomial name
- Carpathonesticus caucasicus (Charitonov, 1947)

Synonyms
- Nesticus caucasicus Charitonov, 1947

Species of spider

Carpathonesticus caucasicus is a species of araneomorph spider of the family Nesticidae. It occurs in Georgia, where it is found in caves.

== Original publication ==
Charitonov, D.E. (1947). "Spiders and harvestspiders from the caves of the Black Sea coast of the Caucasus". Byulleten Moskovskogo Obshchestva Ispytatelei Prirody (N.S., Biol.). 52: 15–28.
