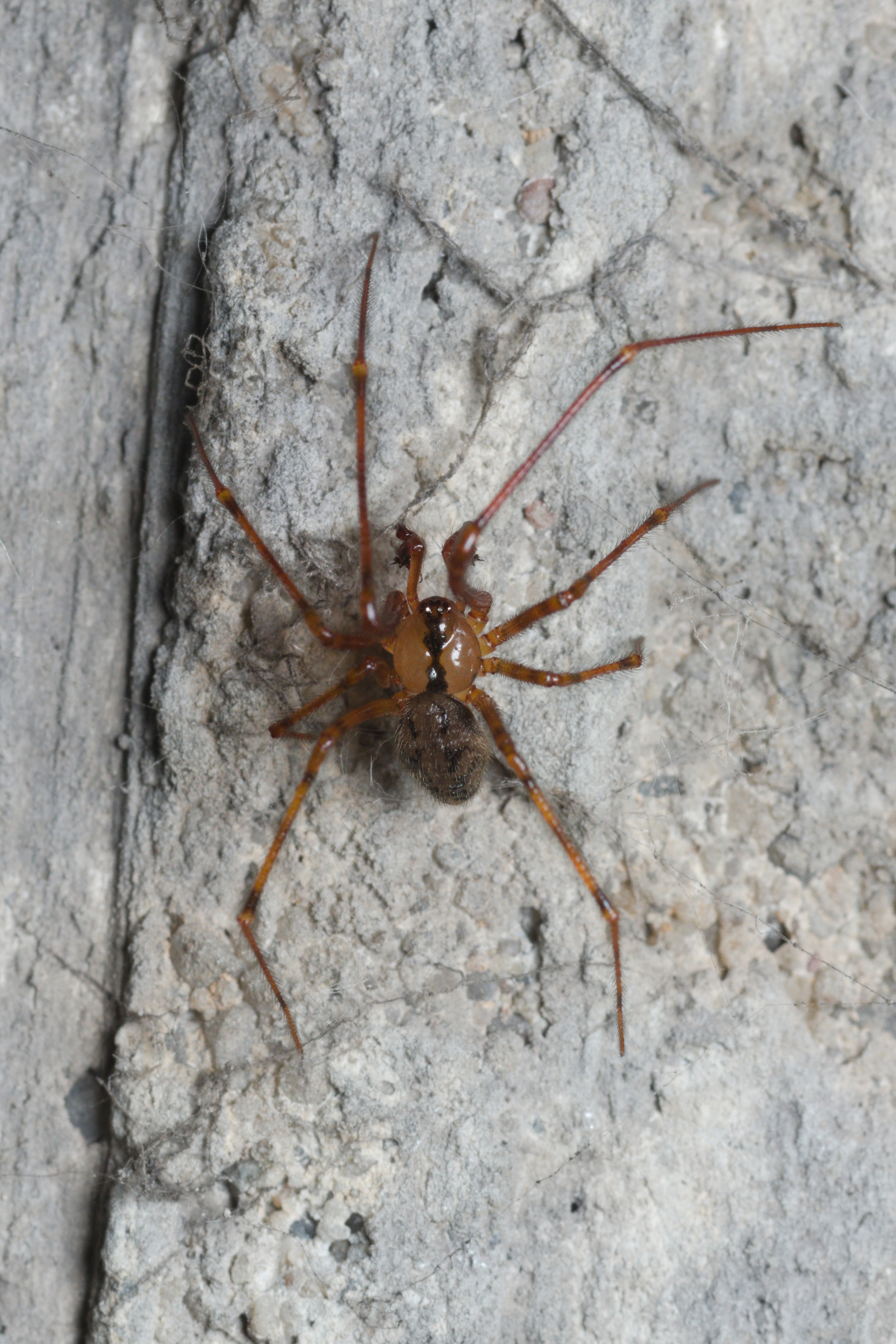
- A male Nesticus cellulanus

Scientific classification
- Domain: Eukaryota
- Kingdom: Animalia
- Phylum: Arthropoda
- Subphylum: Chelicerata
- Class: Arachnida
- Order: Araneae
- Infraorder: Araneomorphae
- Family: Nesticidae
- Genus: Nesticus
- Species: N. cellulanus

Binomial name
- Nesticus cellulanus (Clerck, 1757)

Synonyms
- Nesticus cellulans; Theridion terrestrellum Roewer, 1942; Araneus cellulanus Clerck, 1757

= Nesticus cellulanus =

Species of spider

Nesticus cellulanus, also known as the cavity spider or comb-footed cellar spider, is a species of scaffold web spider. It is found throughout Europe and Turkey, and has been introduced to North America.

== Description ==
The eye arrangement of spiders in the genus Nesticus

This species is very similar to the spiders of the Theridiidae family and even have a comb on their fourth tarsi. Adult males have a body length of 3–5 mm (0.12–0.20 in), females 3.5–6 mm (0.14–0.24 in). Besides this slight size difference, the sexes are very similar in appearance. The carapace is pale yellow, with a dark brown median band which narrows towards the middle, and thin, dark marginal lines. The abdomen is also pale yellow, with three or four dark rings to either side of an irregular median band. The legs are coloured as the carapace, and sometimes bear dark annulations. The colour of the markings can vary depending on the light level of the habitat, with darker habitats causing lighter markings.

== Distribution and habitat ==
Nesticus cellulanus has a holarctic distribution and is found throughout Europe and Turkey. It has also been introduced to northeastern United States and Canada.

This species is found primarily in damp, dark habitats such as caves, mines, cellars, sewers and hollow trees, where they construct a web similar to that of the steatoda. The web creates a loose platform of sticky threads that traps crawling insects.

== Behaviour ==
=== Reproduction ===
This species mates during the early summer and egg sacs are produced between June and August. Adults are found throughout the year.

The male commences courtship after it comes into contact with the female's silk thread. Initially, it consists of gentle knocking with its pedipalps and abdominal jerking. This increases in intensity until copulation takes place and may even result in partial destruction of the female's web. The female eventually turns towards the male and suspends herself in a vertical position, upon which the male pushes his conductor into the female insemination orifice. After the male extracts his first bulb, he may attempt a second insertion with the other one after renewing palpal knocking. The spiders separate peacefully after copulation is completed. Eggs are laid after 34 to 54 days after copulation and spiderlings hatch after 25 to 28 days.

Newly-moulted females do not react to a male's courtship while inseminated females react aggressively by rushing towards the male.

== Taxonomy ==
Nesticus cellulanus contains two subspecies: N. c. cellulans (the nominate subspecies), and N. c. affinis.
