= Carpathonesticus biroi =

Scientific classification
- Kingdom: Animalia
- Phylum: Arthropoda
- Subphylum: Chelicerata
- Class: Arachnida
- Order: Araneae
- Infraorder: Araneomorphae
- Family: Nesticidae
- Genus: Carpathonesticus
- Species: C. biroi

Binomial name
- Carpathonesticus biroi (Kulczyński, 1895)

Synonyms
- Nesticus biroi Kulczyński, 1895; Nesticus ionescui Simon in Ionescu, 1915 (Nomen nudum)

Species of spider

Carpathonesticus biroi is a species of araneomorph spider of the family Nesticidae. It occurs in Romania, where it is found in caves.

== Original publication ==
Kulczyński, W. (1895). "Über die Theridioiden der Spinninfauna Ungarns". Mathematische und Naturwissenschaftliche Berichte aus Ungarn. 12: 321–338.
