= Carpathonesticus mamajevae =

Scientific classification
- Kingdom: Animalia
- Phylum: Arthropoda
- Subphylum: Chelicerata
- Class: Arachnida
- Order: Araneae
- Infraorder: Araneomorphae
- Family: Nesticidae
- Genus: Carpathonesticus
- Species: C. mamajevae

Binomial name
- Carpathonesticus mamajevae Marusik, 1987

Synonyms
- Carpatonesticus mamajevae Marusik, 1987

Species of spider

Carpathonesticus mamajevae is an araneomorph spider species of the family Nesticidae. It occurs in Georgia, in the Lagodekhi Nature Reserve.

== Description ==
The prosoma has a length of 1.6–2.9 mm and a width of 1.4–2.2 mm in females. In males, the prosoma length is 2.0–2.7 mm and the width 1.6–2.0 mm.

== Original publication ==
Marusik, Y.M. (1987). "Three new species of the family Nesticidae (Aranei) from the fauna of the USSR". Zoologicheskiĭ Zhurnal. 66 (3): 461–463.
