= Carpathonesticus simoni =

Scientific classification
- Kingdom: Animalia
- Phylum: Arthropoda
- Subphylum: Chelicerata
- Class: Arachnida
- Order: Araneae
- Infraorder: Araneomorphae
- Family: Nesticidae
- Genus: Carpathonesticus
- Species: C. simoni

Binomial name
- Carpathonesticus simoni (Fage, 1931)

Synonyms
- Nesticus simoni Fage, 1931

Species of spider

Carpathonesticus simoni is an araneomorph spider species of the family Nesticidae. It occurs in Romania, where it can be found in caves. It was transferred from the genus Nesticus to Carpathonesticus in 1980 by Lehtinen and Saaristo.

== Description ==
The prosoma and appendages are a pale reddish yellow with a very faint pattern; the opisthosoma likewise is very faintly patterned, but also has three pairs of blotches. Prosoma length is 2.4 mm in females and 2.1 mm in males.

== Original publication ==
Fage, L. (1931). "Araneae, 5e série, précédée d'un essai sur l'évolution souterraine et son déterminisme". Biospeologica LV in Archives de Zoologie Expérimentale et Générale. 71: 91–291.
