= Carpathonesticus lotriensis =

Scientific classification
- Kingdom: Animalia
- Phylum: Arthropoda
- Subphylum: Chelicerata
- Class: Arachnida
- Order: Araneae
- Infraorder: Araneomorphae
- Family: Nesticidae
- Genus: Carpathonesticus
- Species: C. lotriensis

Binomial name
- Carpathonesticus lotriensis Weiss, 1983

Species of spider

Carpathonesticus lotriensis is an araneomorph spider species of the family Nesticidae. It occurs in Romania, where it can be found in caves.

== Description ==
The prosoma length is 2 mm in male and female specimens of C. lotriensis. The described female had a body length of 5.2 mm; male body length is 4.7 mm. Body colouration and patterning are similar to that of other species of Carpathonesticus.

== Original publication ==
Weiss, I. (1983). "Carpathonesticus lotriensis n. sp., eine neue Höhlenspinne aus Rumänien (Arachnida, Araneae, Nesticidae)". Reichenbachia. 21: 107–112.
