= Nesticella quelpartensis =

Scientific classification
- Kingdom: Animalia
- Phylum: Arthropoda
- Subphylum: Chelicerata
- Class: Arachnida
- Order: Araneae
- Infraorder: Araneomorphae
- Family: Nesticidae
- Genus: Nesticella
- Species: N. quelpartensis

Binomial name
- Nesticella quelpartensis Paik & Namkung, 1969

Synonyms
- Howaia quelpartensis (Paik & Namkung, 1969)

Species of spider

Nesticella quelpartensis, sometimes referred to as the Jeju cave baby spider, is a species of spider found only in South Korea. Its sole habitat is the lava caves of Jeju Island (a former name of which, "Quelpart", gives the species epithet, quelpartensis).

== Description ==
The females have a body length around 2.8 to 3.0 mm (0.11 to 0.12 in), while males are approximately 3.0 mm (0.12 in) in size. Their abdomen is yellow-brown without any distinct patterns. The central groove, neck groove, and radial groove are clearly distinguishable. The anterior median eyes are slightly anterior, and the posterior median eyes are posterior. The front anterior lateral eyes are slightly anterior, and the posterior lateral eyes are posterior. The anterior median eyes are the smallest, and the rear lateral eyes are the largest. The chelicerae are brown and feature 3 promarginal teeth and 7 retromarginal teeth, with no cuspules on the maxilla and slight protuberances between the teeth. The lower jaw is brown, but the tip is light. The lower labium is brown and adheres to the thorax plate. The thorax plate is yellow-brown with long black hairs that has a heart shape and the fourth leg fits into a socket. The legs are yellow-brown, slender, with numerous setae. There are no spines on the legs, and there are sensory setae on the tibia and metatarsus. The leg formula is 1-4-2-3. The abdomen is oval-shaped, pale yellow with long hairs. The mamillae are slightly larger, cone-shaped, and have 2 hairs at the tip. The external genitalia of the female are generally rectangular. The male copulatory organ has a very large distal lobe and features protrusions resembling thumb-like processes on the outer surface.

As with all cave-dwelling organisms, this spider is extremely vulnerable to changes in its environment because it has adapted to the specific cave environment over a long period of time.

== Current samples ==
There are currently two samples of the species being kept in the National Institute of Biological Resources, collected on September 20, 1980, and September 15, 2006.
