= Carpathonesticus =

Scientific classification
- Kingdom: Animalia
- Phylum: Arthropoda
- Subphylum: Chelicerata
- Class: Arachnida
- Order: Araneae
- Infraorder: Araneomorphae
- Family: Nesticidae
- Genus: Carpathonesticus; Lehtinen & Saaristo, 1980

Species
- 21, see text

Genus of spiders

Carpathonesticus is a genus of spiders in the family Nesticidae. It was first described in 1980 by Lehtinen & Saaristo. As of December 2019, it contains 21 species.

== Species ==
Carpathonesticus comprises the following species:

- Carpathonesticus avrigensis Weiss & Heimer, 1982 — Romania
- Carpathonesticus biroi (Kulczyński, 1895) — Romania
- Carpathonesticus birsteini (Charitonov, 1947) — Russia, Georgia
- Carpathonesticus borutzkyi (Reimoser, 1930) — Turkey, Georgia, Ukraine
- Carpathonesticus caucasicus (Charitonov, 1947) — Georgia
- Carpathonesticus cibiniensis (Weiss, 1981) — Romania
- Carpathonesticus eriashvilii Marusik, 1987 — Georgia
- Carpathonesticus fodinarum (Kulczyński, 1894) — Romania
- Carpathonesticus galotshkae Evtushenko, 1993 — Ukraine
- Carpathonesticus hungaricus (Chyzer, 1894) — Romania
- Carpathonesticus ljovuschkini (Pichka, 1965) — Russia
- Carpathonesticus lotriensis Weiss, 1983 — Romania
- Carpathonesticus mamajevae Marusik, 1987 — Georgia
- Carpathonesticus orolesi Nae, 2013 — Romania
- Carpathonesticus paraavrigensis Weiss & Heimer, 1982 — Romania
- Carpathonesticus parvus (Kulczyński, 1914) — Bosnia-Hercegovina
- Carpathonesticus puteorum (Kulczyński, 1894) — Romania
- Carpathonesticus racovitzai (Dumitrescu, 1980) — Romania
- Carpathonesticus simoni (Fage, 1931) — Romania
- Carpathonesticus spelaeus (Szombathy, 1917) — Romania
- Carpathonesticus zaitzevi (Charitonov, 1939) — Georgia

== Former species ==
The following species were transferred from Carpathonesticus to other genera:

- Carpathonesticus menozzii (Caporiacco, 1934) — Italy (now Domitius menozzii)
- Carpathonesticus ponticus (Spassky, 1932) (now Aituaria pontica)
