= Sacarum =

Scientific classification
- Kingdom: Animalia
- Phylum: Arthropoda
- Subphylum: Chelicerata
- Class: Arachnida
- Order: Araneae
- Infraorder: Araneomorphae
- Family: Nesticidae
- Genus: Sacarum; Esyunin & Efimik, 2022
- Species: S. nemkovi

Binomial name
- Sacarum nemkovi Esyunin & Efimik, 2022

Species of spider

Sacarum is a monotypic genus of spiders in the family Nesticidae containing the single species, Sacarum nemkovi.

== Distribution ==
Sacarum nemkovi has been recorded from Russia (Europe).

== Description ==
Only the female has been described. It has a body length of 2.4 mm. The carapace is roundish and brownish or greyish yellow.

== Etymology ==
The genus is named after the Latin name for the Scythians (Sacarum), who used to inhabit the Eurasian steppe regions known as Scythia. The species is named after entomologist Viktor A. Nemkov, who collected the holotype.
