= Carpathonesticus parvus =

Scientific classification
- Kingdom: Animalia
- Phylum: Arthropoda
- Subphylum: Chelicerata
- Class: Arachnida
- Order: Araneae
- Infraorder: Araneomorphae
- Family: Nesticidae
- Genus: Carpathonesticus
- Species: C. parvus

Binomial name
- Carpathonesticus parvus (Kulczyński, 1914)

Synonyms
- Typhlonesticus parvus Kulczyński, 1914; Nesticus parvus

Species of spider

Carpathonesticus parvus is a species of araneomorph spider of the family Nesticidae. It occurs in Bosnia-Hercegovina, where it is found in caves. It was originally described from a single female specimen.

== Description ==
Carpathonesticus parvus has a pale yellowish prosoma and appendages. The opisthosoma is pale brownish. Prosoma length is 0.75–0.9 mm in female and 0.87 mm in male specimens; prosoma width is 0.60 mm in females and 0.81 mm in males.

== Original publication ==
Kulczyński, W. (1914). "Aranearum species novae minusve cognitae, in montibus Kras dictis a Dre C. Absolon aliisque collectae". Bulletin International de l'Académie des Sciences de Cracovie: 380–381.
