= Nesticella aelleni =

Scientific classification
- Kingdom: Animalia
- Phylum: Arthropoda
- Subphylum: Chelicerata
- Class: Arachnida
- Order: Araneae
- Infraorder: Araneomorphae
- Family: Nesticidae
- Genus: Nesticella
- Species: N. aelleni

Binomial name
- Nesticella aelleni (Brignoli, 1972)

Species of spider

Nesticella aelleni, is a species of spider of the genus Nesticella. It is endemic to Sri Lanka.
