= Carpathonesticus racovitzai =

Scientific classification
- Kingdom: Animalia
- Phylum: Arthropoda
- Subphylum: Chelicerata
- Class: Arachnida
- Order: Araneae
- Infraorder: Araneomorphae
- Family: Nesticidae
- Genus: Carpathonesticus
- Species: C. racovitzai

Binomial name
- Carpathonesticus racovitzai (Dumitrescu, 1980)

Synonyms
- Nesticus racovitzai Dumitrescu, 1980

Species of spider

Carpathonesticus racovitzai is an araneomorph spider species of the family Nesticidae. It occurs in Romania, where it can be found both in caves and outdoors. It was transferred from the genus Nesticus to Carpathonesticus in 1982 by Weiss and Heimer.

== Description ==
Females have an unpatterned prosoma with a reddish yellow sternum and appendages. The prosoma length is 2.3 mm. The eyes are ringed brown. The opisthosoma is unpatterned. Males have a prosoma length of 2.2 mm. The eyes are ringed blackish brown.

== Original publication ==
Dumitrescu, M. (1980). "La monographie des représentants du genre Nesticus des grottes de Roumanie, IIe note". Travaux de l'Institut de Spéologie "Émile Racovitza". 19: 77–101.
