= Carpathonesticus cibiniensis =

Scientific classification
- Kingdom: Animalia
- Phylum: Arthropoda
- Subphylum: Chelicerata
- Class: Arachnida
- Order: Araneae
- Infraorder: Araneomorphae
- Family: Nesticidae
- Genus: Carpathonesticus
- Species: C. cibiniensis

Binomial name
- Carpathonesticus cibiniensis (Weiss, 1981)

Synonyms
- Nesticus cibiniensis Weiss, 1981; Carpathonesticus cibiensis Wunderlich, 1986

Species of spider

Carpathonesticus cibiniensis is an araneomorph spider species of the family Nesticidae. It occurs in Romania, where it can be found in the cellars of old houses.

== Original publication ==
Weiss, I. (1981). "Der Kopulationsmechanismus bei Nesticus cibiniensis n. sp., einer neuen Höhlenspinne aus Rumänien (Arachnida, Araneae, Nesticidae)". Reichenbachia. 19: 143–152.
