= Carpathonesticus galotshkae =

Scientific classification
- Kingdom: Animalia
- Phylum: Arthropoda
- Subphylum: Chelicerata
- Class: Arachnida
- Order: Araneae
- Infraorder: Araneomorphae
- Family: Nesticidae
- Genus: Carpathonesticus
- Species: C. galotshkae

Binomial name
- Carpathonesticus galotshkae Evtushenko, 1993

Synonyms
- Carpathonesticus galothskai Evtushenko, 1993

Species of spider

Carpathonesticus galotshkae is a species of araneomorph spider of the family Nesticidae. It occurs in caves in the Ukrainian Eastern Carpathians.

== Original publication ==
- Evtushenko, K.V. (1993). "A new species of the genus Carpathonesticus (Aranei Nesticidae) from the East Carpathians of the Ukraine". Arthropoda Selecta. 2 (3): 61–63.
