= Carpathonesticus borutzkyi =

Scientific classification
- Kingdom: Animalia
- Phylum: Arthropoda
- Subphylum: Chelicerata
- Class: Arachnida
- Order: Araneae
- Infraorder: Araneomorphae
- Family: Nesticidae
- Genus: Carpathonesticus
- Species: C. borutzkyi

Binomial name
- Carpathonesticus borutzkyi (Reimoser, 1930)

Synonyms
- Nesticus borutzkyi Reimoser, 1930

Species of spider

Carpathonesticus borutzkyi is a species of araneomorph spider of the family Nesticidae. It occurs in Russia, Georgia, Turkey and Ukraine and is found in caves.

== Original publication ==
Reimoser, E. (1930). "Eine neue Nesticus-Art aus dem Kaukasus". Zoologischer Anzeiger. 88: 158–159.
