= Carpathonesticus zaitzevi =

Scientific classification
- Kingdom: Animalia
- Phylum: Arthropoda
- Subphylum: Chelicerata
- Class: Arachnida
- Order: Araneae
- Infraorder: Araneomorphae
- Family: Nesticidae
- Genus: Carpathonesticus
- Species: C. zaitzevi

Binomial name
- Carpathonesticus zaitzevi (Charitonov, 1939)

Synonyms
- Nesticus zaitzevi Charitonov, 1939

Species of spider

Carpathonesticus zaitzevi is an araneomorph spider species of the family Nesticidae that occurs in Georgia. It was transferred from the genus Nesticus to Carpathonesticus in 1996.

== Description ==
Female specimens of C. zaitzevi have an orange-yellow prosoma with a length of 1.9–2.55 mm. The cephalic part of the prosoma is shining. The sternum is orange-yellow and sparsely covered with short and long setae. The opisthosoma is covered with grey setae. The dorsum has two triangular marks, or occasionally five pairs of marks. In some cases, the marks are absent.

Male specimens have a prosoma length of 1.8–2.3 mm. Males are coloured like females, but the opisthosomal markings are more pronounced.

== Original publication ==
Charitonov, D.E. (1939). "On the cave spiders of Abkhasia". Académie des Sciences l'URSS, Filiale Géorgienne, Section de Zoologie: 197–210.
