= Carpathonesticus fodinarum =

Scientific classification
- Kingdom: Animalia
- Phylum: Arthropoda
- Subphylum: Chelicerata
- Class: Arachnida
- Order: Araneae
- Infraorder: Araneomorphae
- Family: Nesticidae
- Genus: Carpathonesticus
- Species: C. fodinarum

Binomial name
- Carpathonesticus fodinarum (Kulczyński, 1894)

Synonyms
- Nesticus fodinarum Kulczyński, 1894; Nesticus tenebricola Szombathy, 1917

Species of spider

Carpathonesticus fodinarum is a species of araneomorph spider of the family Nesticidae. It occurs in Romania, where it occurs in caves.

== Description ==
Female specimen have a yellowish prosoma with a darker ocular area and a yellow-grey opisthosoma with a faint pattern. The prosoma is slightly larger in male than in female specimen: 2.2–2.3 mm in males, 2-2.2 mm in females.

== Original publication ==
Chyzer, C.; Kulczyński, W. (1894). Araneae Hungariae II. Budapest: Academiae Scientarum Hungaricae.
