= Carpathonesticus spelaeus =

Scientific classification
- Kingdom: Animalia
- Phylum: Arthropoda
- Subphylum: Chelicerata
- Class: Arachnida
- Order: Araneae
- Infraorder: Araneomorphae
- Family: Nesticidae
- Genus: Carpathonesticus
- Species: C. spelaeus

Binomial name
- Carpathonesticus spelaeus (Szombathy, 1917)

Synonyms
- Nesticus spelaeus Szombathy, 1917

Species of spider

Carpathonesticus spelaeus is an araneomorph spider species of the family Nesticidae. It is found in Romania, where it can be found in caves and outdoors under calcareous blocks. It was transferred from the genus Nesticus to Carpathonesticus in 1980 by Lehtinen and Saaristo.

== Description ==
Prosoma length is 2.4 mm in male and female specimens. In females, the prosoma is pale yellowish with a very faint pattern; the sternum and appendages are a pale reddish yellow. The opisthosoma is very faintly patterned. The eyes are ringed with a light brownish shade.

== Original publication ==
Szombathy, C. (1917). "A magyarországi Nesticus-félékröl (Nesticus spelaeus és N. tenebricola n. sp.)". Barlangkutatás. 5. Budapest: 33–39, 74–78.
