= Nesticella marapu =

Scientific classification
- Domain: Eukaryota
- Kingdom: Animalia
- Phylum: Arthropoda
- Subphylum: Chelicerata
- Class: Arachnida
- Order: Araneae
- Infraorder: Araneomorphae
- Family: Nesticidae
- Genus: Nesticella
- Species: N. marapu

Binomial name
- Nesticella marapu Benjamin, 2004

Species of spider

Nesticella marapu is an eyeless spider from Sumba, Indonesia. It has long legs and weak pigmentation. It is distinguished by all other species in the genus Nesticella by the beak-shaped paracymbium.

The species is of a bright yellow color, with a body length of less than 3mm, males being a bit smaller. Of the eyes, not even eye sockets are visible.

It is only known from the 3 km long Marro cave close to Kabalidana, west of Waimangura.

== Name ==
The species name marapu is derived from the Sumbanese spirit of ancestors Marapu.
