= Carpathonesticus puteorum =

Scientific classification
- Kingdom: Animalia
- Phylum: Arthropoda
- Subphylum: Chelicerata
- Class: Arachnida
- Order: Araneae
- Infraorder: Araneomorphae
- Family: Nesticidae
- Genus: Carpathonesticus
- Species: C. puteorum

Binomial name
- Carpathonesticus puteorum (Kulczyński, 1894)

Synonyms
- Nesticus puteorum Kulczyński, 1894

Species of spider

Carpathonesticus puteorum is a species of araneomorph spider of the family Nesticidae. It is found in the Romanian caves at an altitude of 460 to 930 m (1,510 to 3,050 ft).

== Description ==
Carpathonesticus puteorum specimens have a pale reddish prosoma with black suffusion. The opisthosoma is pale grey with dorsal pairs of patches. The legs are a reddish yellow. The prosoma length is 1.6 to 2.4 mm (0.063 to 0.094 in) in female and 2.2 mm (0.087 in) in male specimens.

== Original publication ==
Chyzer, C.; Kulczyński, W. (1894). Araneae Hungariae II. Budapest: Academiae Scientarum Hungaricae.
