= Hamus =

Scientific classification
- Domain: Eukaryota
- Kingdom: Animalia
- Phylum: Arthropoda
- Subphylum: Chelicerata
- Class: Arachnida
- Order: Araneae
- Infraorder: Araneomorphae
- Family: Nesticidae
- Genus: Hamus; Li

Species
- Hamus bowoensis Ballarin & Li, 2015; Hamus cornutus Lin, Ballarin & Li, 2016; Hamus kangdingensis Lin, Ballarin & Li, 2016; Hamus luzon Lin, Ballarin & Li, 2016; Hamus mangunensis Lin, Ballarin & Li, 2016

Genus of spiders

Hamus is a genus of spiders in the family Nesticidae. It was first described in 2015 by Ballarin & Li. As of 2016, it contains 5 species.
