= Nesticella =

Scientific classification
- Kingdom: Animalia
- Phylum: Arthropoda
- Subphylum: Chelicerata
- Class: Arachnida
- Order: Araneae
- Infraorder: Araneomorphae
- Family: Nesticidae
- Genus: Nesticella; Lehtinen & Saaristo, 1980

Species
- See text

Diversity
- 70 species

Genus of spiders

Nesticella is a genus of spiders of the family Nesticidae. Most of its species are found in Asia—from Russia to Japan, down to Indonesia and several other islands, including New Guinea—though some species from Africa and South-America are also known. It includes a blind spider, Nesticella marapu.

== Species ==
As of October 2025, this genus includes seventy species:

- Nesticella aelleni (Brignoli, 1972) – Sri Lanka
- Nesticella africana (Hubert, 1970) – DR Congo
- Nesticella arcuata Liu & Li, 2013 – China
- Nesticella baiseensis Lin, Ballarin & Li, 2016 – China
- Nesticella baobab Lin, Ballarin & Li, 2016 – Madagascar
- Nesticella beccus Grall & Jäger, 2016 – China, Laos, Thailand
- Nesticella benoiti (Hubert, 1970) – Zimbabwe
- Nesticella brevipes (Yaginuma, 1970) – Japan, Russia, (Far East), China? Korea?
- Nesticella buicongchieni (Lehtinen & Saaristo, 1980) – Vietnam
- Nesticella caeca Lin, Ballarin & Li, 2016 – China
- Nesticella chillagoensis Wunderlich, 1995 – Australia (Queensland)
- Nesticella chongqing Lin, Ballarin & Li, 2016 – China
- Nesticella connectens Wunderlich, 1995 – Malaysia, Thailand
- Nesticella dazhuangensis Lin, Ballarin & Li, 2016 – China
- Nesticella ducke Rodrigues & Buckup, 2007 – Brazil
- Nesticella falcata Liu & Li, 2013 – China
- Nesticella foelixi Grall & Jäger, 2016 – Laos
- Nesticella ganlong Wang, Zheng & Zhang, 2022 – China
- Nesticella gazuida Lin, Ballarin & Li, 2016 – China
- Nesticella gongshanensis Lin, Ballarin & Li, 2016 – China
- Nesticella gracilenta Liu & Li, 2013 – China
- Nesticella griswoldi Lin, Ballarin & Li, 2016 – Madagascar
- Nesticella hongheensis Lin, Ballarin & Li, 2016 – China
- Nesticella insulana Ballarin & Eguchi, 2023 – Japan (Ryukyu Is.)
- Nesticella inthanoni (Lehtinen & Saaristo, 1980) – Myanmar, Thailand
- Nesticella jingpo Lin, Ballarin & Li, 2016 – China
- Nesticella kaohsiungensis Lin, Ballarin & Li, 2016 – China
- Nesticella kerzhneri (Marusik, 1987) – Russia (Far East), Korea
- Nesticella laotica Grall & Jäger, 2016 – Laos
- Nesticella lisu Lin, Ballarin & Li, 2016 – China
- Nesticella liuzhaiensis Lin, Ballarin & Li, 2016 – China
- Nesticella machadoi (Hubert, 1971) – Angola
- Nesticella marapu Benjamin, 2004 – Indonesia
- Nesticella michaliki Grall & Jäger, 2016 – Myanmar
- Nesticella murici Rodrigues & Buckup, 2007 – Brazil
- Nesticella nandanensis Lin, Ballarin & Li, 2016 – China
- Nesticella nepalensis (Hubert, 1973) – India, Nepal, China (type species)
- Nesticella occulta Ballarin & Eguchi, 2023 – Japan (Ryukyu Is.)
- Nesticella odonta (Chen, 1984) – China
- Nesticella okinawaensis (Yaginuma, 1979) – Japan
- Nesticella phami Lin, Ballarin & Li, 2016 – Vietnam
- Nesticella potala Lin, Ballarin & Li, 2016 – China
- Nesticella proszynskii (Lehtinen & Saaristo, 1980) – Indonesia (Java)
- Nesticella qiaoqiensis Lin, Ballarin & Li, 2016 – China
- Nesticella qiongensis Lin, Ballarin & Li, 2016 – China
- Nesticella quelpartensis (Paik & Namkung, 1969) – Korea
- Nesticella renata (Bourne, 1980) – Papua New Guinea (New Ireland)
- Nesticella robinsoni Lehtinen & Saaristo, 1980 – New Guinea
- Nesticella robusta Lin, Ballarin & Li, 2016 – China
- Nesticella sanchaheensis Lin, Ballarin & Li, 2016 – China
- Nesticella sechellana (Simon, 1898) – Seychelles
- Nesticella semicircularis Liu & Li, 2013 – China
- Nesticella shanlinensis Liu & Li, 2013 – China
- Nesticella silvicola Ballarin & Eguchi, 2023 – Japan (Ryukyu Is.)
- Nesticella sogi Lehtinen & Saaristo, 1980 – New Guinea
- Nesticella songi Chen & Zhu, 2004 – China
- Nesticella sulawesi Lin, Ballarin & Li, 2016 – Indonesia (Sulawesi)
- Nesticella sumatrana Lin, Ballarin & Li, 2016 – Indonesia (Sumatra)
- Nesticella taurama Lehtinen & Saaristo, 1980 – New Guinea
- Nesticella terrestris (Yaginuma, 1970) – Russia (Sakhalin), Japan, Korea?
- Nesticella tibetana Lin, Ballarin & Li, 2016 – China
- Nesticella utuensis (Bourne, 1980) – Papua New Guinea (New Ireland)
- Nesticella vanlang Lin, Ballarin & Li, 2016 – Vietnam
- Nesticella verticalis Liu & Li, 2013 – China
- Nesticella wuxi Wang, Zheng & Zhang, 2022 – China
- Nesticella xiongmao Lin, Ballarin & Li, 2016 – China
- Nesticella xixia Lin, Ballarin & Li, 2016 – China
- Nesticella yao Lin, Ballarin & Li, 2016 – China
- Nesticella yui Wunderlich & Song, 1995 – China, Laos
- Nesticella zhiyuani Lin, Ballarin & Li, 2016 – Indonesia (Sumatra)
