= Carpathonesticus avrigensis =

Scientific classification
- Kingdom: Animalia
- Phylum: Arthropoda
- Subphylum: Chelicerata
- Class: Arachnida
- Order: Araneae
- Infraorder: Araneomorphae
- Family: Nesticidae
- Genus: Carpathonesticus
- Species: C. avrigensis

Binomial name
- Carpathonesticus avrigensis Weiss & Heimer, 1982

Species of spider

Carpathonesticus avrigensis is a species of araneomorph spider of the family Nesticidae. It occurs in Romania, where it was discovered in a cave. Only two specimens, a male and a female, are known.

== Description ==
In both sexes, the prosoma is pale yellow with a faint pattern and the opisthosoma is gray with a faint pattern. The male specimen had a body length of 4.8 mm with a prosoma 2.5 mm long; the female specimen was 7.2 mm long with a prosoma length of 2.8 mm.

== Original publication ==
- Weiss, I.; Heimer, S. (1982). "Zwei neue Carpathonesticus-Arten aus Rumänien nebst Betrachtungen über Kopulationsmechanismen und deren Evolution (Arachnida, Araneae, Nesticidae)". Reichenbachia. 20: 167–174.
