= Nescina =

Scientific classification
- Domain: Eukaryota
- Kingdom: Animalia
- Phylum: Arthropoda
- Subphylum: Chelicerata
- Class: Arachnida
- Order: Araneae
- Infraorder: Araneomorphae
- Family: Nesticidae
- Genus: Nescina; Li

Species
- Nescina kohi Lin, Ballarin & Li, 2016; Nescina minuta Ballarin & Li, 2015

Genus of spiders

Nescina is a genus of spiders in the family Nesticidae. It was first described in 2015 by Ballarin & Li. As of 2016, it contains 2 species.
