= Aituaria pontica =

Scientific classification
- Kingdom: Animalia
- Phylum: Arthropoda
- Subphylum: Chelicerata
- Class: Arachnida
- Order: Araneae
- Infraorder: Araneomorphae
- Family: Nesticidae
- Genus: Aituaria
- Species: A. pontica

Binomial name
- Aituaria pontica (Spassky, 1932)

Synonyms
- Nesticus ponticus Spassky, 1932; Carpathonesticus ponticus (Spassky, 1932)

Species of spider

Aituaria pontica is an araneomorph spider of the family Nesticidae. It occurs in the Krasnodar region of Russia and in Georgia.

== Original publication ==
- Spassky, S. A. (1932). "Aranearum species novae, II". Bulletin du Muséum National d'Histoire Naturelle de Paris. 2 (4): 972–979.
