= Tekellina =

Scientific classification
- Kingdom: Animalia
- Phylum: Arthropoda
- Subphylum: Chelicerata
- Class: Arachnida
- Order: Araneae
- Infraorder: Araneomorphae
- Family: Theridiidae
- Genus: Tekellina; Levi, 1957

Type species
- T. archboldi Levi, 1957

Species
- 9, see text

Genus of spiders

Tekellina is a genus of comb-footed spiders that was first described by Herbert Walter Levi in 1957.

== Species ==
As of June 2020 it contains nine species, found in east Asia and the Americas:

- Tekellina archboldi Levi, 1957 (type) – USA
- Tekellina bella Marques & Buckup, 1993 – Brazil
- Tekellina crica Marques & Buckup, 1993 – Brazil
- Tekellina guaiba Marques & Buckup, 1993 – Brazil
- Tekellina helixicis Gao & Li, 2014 – China
- Tekellina minor Marques & Buckup, 1993 – Brazil
- Tekellina pretiosa Marques & Buckup, 1993 – Brazil
- Tekellina sadamotoi Yoshida & Ogata, 2016 – Japan
- Tekellina yoshidai Marusik & Omelko, 2017 – Russia (Far East)
