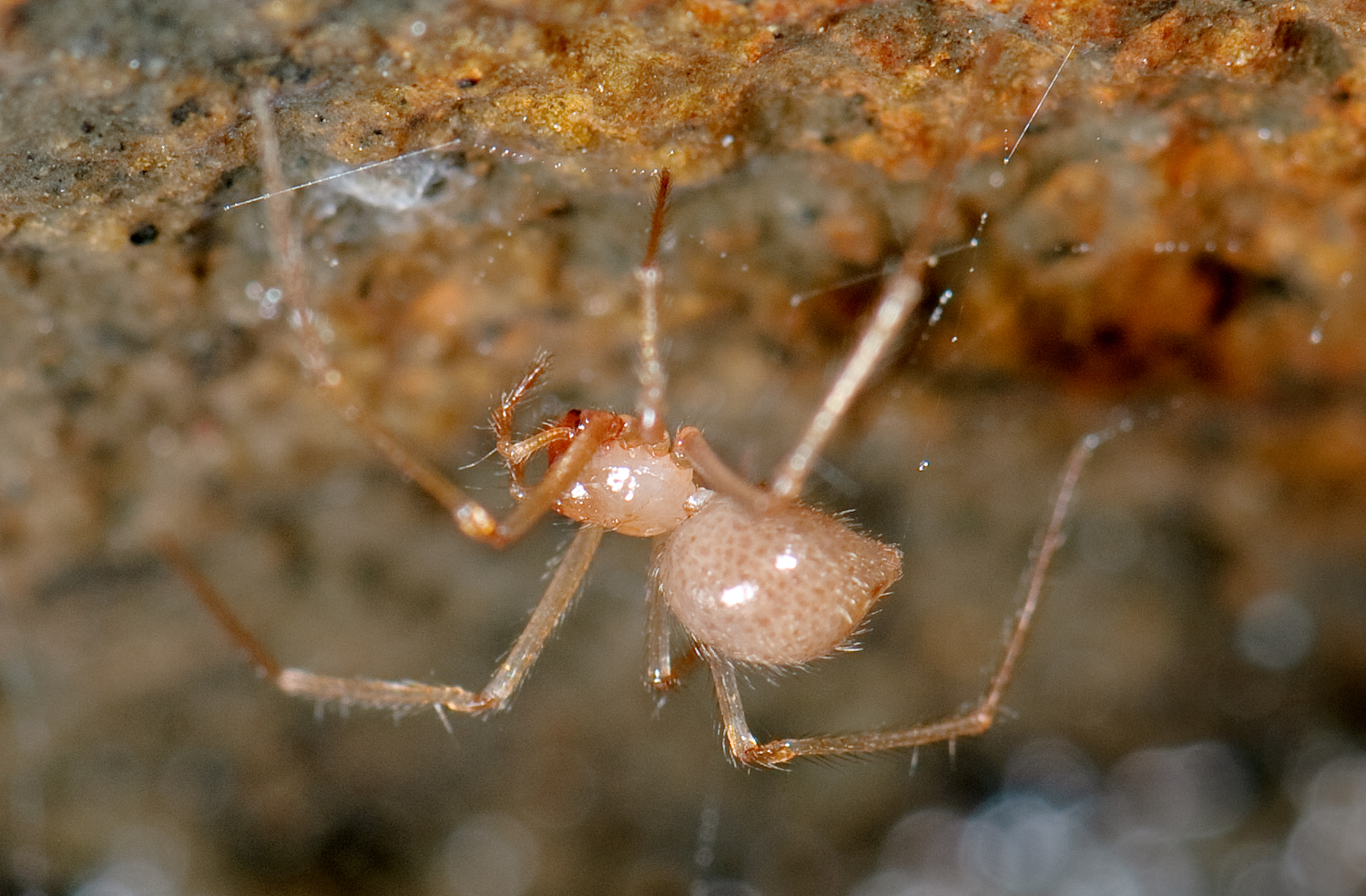
- E. pallida

Scientific classification
- Domain: Eukaryota
- Kingdom: Animalia
- Phylum: Arthropoda
- Subphylum: Chelicerata
- Class: Arachnida
- Order: Araneae
- Infraorder: Araneomorphae
- Family: Nesticidae
- Genus: Eidmannella; Roewer

Type species
- Eidmannella pallida

Species
- 8, see text

= Eidmannella =

Genus of spiders

Eidmannella is a genus of scaffold web spiders first described by Carl Friedrich Roewer in 1935.

== Species ==
As of February 2019, it contains eight species:

- Eidmannella bullata Gertsch, 1984
- Eidmannella delicata Gertsch, 1984
- Eidmannella nasuta Gertsch, 1984
- Eidmannella pachona Gertsch, 1984
- Eidmannella pallida (Emerton, 1875)
- Eidmannella reclusa Gertsch, 1984
- Eidmannella rostrata Gertsch, 1984
- Eidmannella tuckeri Cokendolpher & Reddell, 2001
