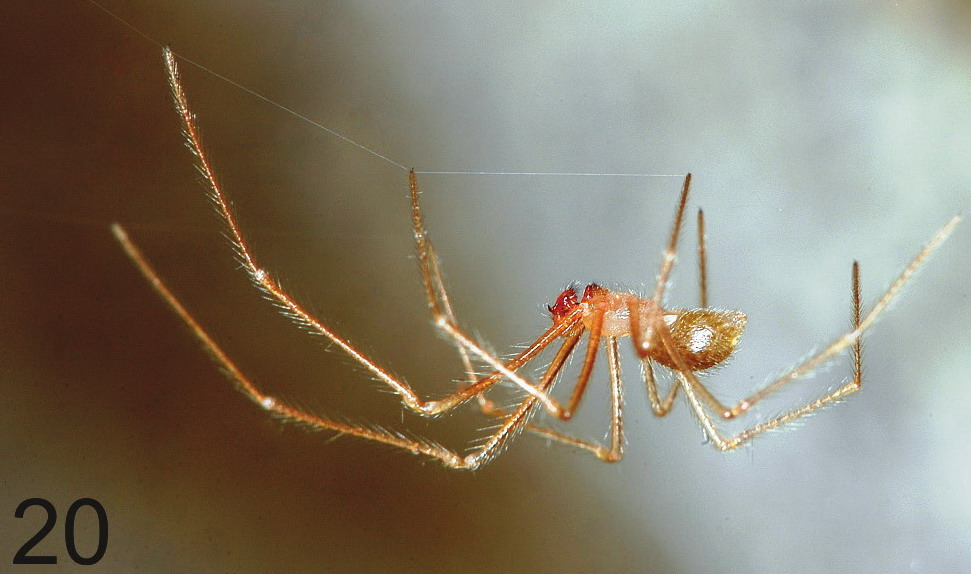
- T. gocmeni, male

Scientific classification
- Domain: Eukaryota
- Kingdom: Animalia
- Phylum: Arthropoda
- Subphylum: Chelicerata
- Class: Arachnida
- Order: Araneae
- Infraorder: Araneomorphae
- Family: Nesticidae
- Genus: Typhlonesticus; Kulczyński

Species
- Typhlonesticus absoloni (Kratochvíl, 1933); Typhlonesticus gocmeni Ribera, Elverici, Kunt & Özkütük, 2014; Typhlonesticus idriacus (Roewer, 1931); Typhlonesticus morisii (Brignoli, 1975); Typhlonesticus obcaecatus (Simon, 1907)

= Typhlonesticus =

Genus of spiders

Typhlonesticus is a genus of scaffold web spiders first described by Władysław Kulczyński in 1914. As of February 2019, it contains only five European species.
