= Cyclocarcina =

Scientific classification
- Domain: Eukaryota
- Kingdom: Animalia
- Phylum: Arthropoda
- Subphylum: Chelicerata
- Class: Arachnida
- Order: Araneae
- Infraorder: Araneomorphae
- Family: Nesticidae
- Genus: Cyclocarcina; Komatsu

Species
- Cyclocarcina floronoides Komatsu, 1942; Cyclocarcina linyphoides (Komatsu, 1960)

Genus of spiders

Cyclocarcina is a genus of spiders in the family Nesticidae. It was first described in 1942 by Komatsu. As of 2017, it contains 2 species, one of which has three subspecies, all from Japan.
