= Speleoticus =

Scientific classification
- Domain: Eukaryota
- Kingdom: Animalia
- Phylum: Arthropoda
- Subphylum: Chelicerata
- Class: Arachnida
- Order: Araneae
- Infraorder: Araneomorphae
- Family: Nesticidae
- Genus: Speleoticus; Ballarin & Li, 2016

Type species
- Speleoticus navicellatus (Liu & Li, 2013)

Species
- See text

Genus of spiders

Speleoticus is a spider genus in the family Nesticidae. Its species are found in Japan and China.

== Species ==
Speleoticus comprises the following species, per the World Spider Catalog:

- Speleoticus globosus (Liu & Li, 2013) — China
- Speleoticus libo (Chen & Zhu, 2005) — China
- Speleoticus navicellatus (Liu & Li, 2013) — China
- Speleoticus uenoi (Yaginuma, 1972) — Japan
- Speleoticus yinchangminae Li, 2016 — China (Note: Speleoticus yinchangminae is a replacement name for Speleoticus yaginumai—previously Nesticus yaginumai Yin, in Yin et al., 2012—a homonym of Nesticus yaginumai Irie, 1987)
