= Canarionesticus =

Scientific classification
- Domain: Eukaryota
- Kingdom: Animalia
- Phylum: Arthropoda
- Subphylum: Chelicerata
- Class: Arachnida
- Order: Araneae
- Infraorder: Araneomorphae
- Family: Nesticidae
- Genus: Canarionesticus; Wunderlich, 1992

Species
- Canarionesticus quadridentatus Wunderlich, 1992

Genus of spiders

Canarionesticus is a monotypic genus of spiders in the family Nesticidae. It was first described in 1992 by Wunderlich. Its sole species is Canarionesticus quadridentatus, found in the Canary Islands.
