= Domitius (spider) =

Scientific classification
- Domain: Eukaryota
- Kingdom: Animalia
- Phylum: Arthropoda
- Subphylum: Chelicerata
- Class: Arachnida
- Order: Araneae
- Infraorder: Araneomorphae
- Family: Nesticidae
- Genus: Domitius; Ribera, 2018

Type species
- D. baeticus (López-Pancorbo & Ribera, 2011)

Species
- 7, see text

Genus of spiders

Domitius is a genus of European scaffold web spiders first described by C. Ribera in 2018.

== Species ==
As of April 2019 it contains seven species:

- Domitius baeticus (López-Pancorbo & Ribera, 2011) — Spain
- Domitius luquei (Ribera & Guerao, 1995) — Spain
- Domitius lusitanicus (Fage, 1931) — Portugal
- Domitius menozzii (Caporiacco, 1934) — Italy
- Domitius murgis (Ribera & De Mas, 2003) — Spain
- Domitius sbordonii (Brignoli, 1979) — Italy
- Domitius speluncarum (Pavesi, 1873) — Italy
