= Domitius menozzii =

Scientific classification
- Kingdom: Animalia
- Phylum: Arthropoda
- Subphylum: Chelicerata
- Class: Arachnida
- Order: Araneae
- Infraorder: Araneomorphae
- Family: Nesticidae
- Genus: Domitius
- Species: D. menozzii

Binomial name
- Domitius menozzii (Caporiacco, 1934)

Synonyms
- Nesticus menozzii Caporiacco, 1934; Carpathonesticus menozzii (Caporiacco, 1934)

Species of spider

Domitius menozzii is an araneomorph spider species of the family Nesticidae. It occurs in Italy, where it can be found in caves. It was described by Ludovico di Caporiacco in 1934 (as Nesticus menozzii).

== Description ==
Male body length is 5.2 mm with a prosoma length of 2.2 mm. Female body length is 6.5 mm with a prosoma length of 2.3 mm. Body colouration is a uniform, pale brown. The anterior median eyes are very reduced.

== Original publication ==
di Caporiacco, L. (1934). "I Nesticus liguri ed emiliani". Annali del Museo Civico di Storia Naturale di Genova. 56: 395–405.
