= Pseudonesticus =

Scientific classification
- Domain: Eukaryota
- Kingdom: Animalia
- Phylum: Arthropoda
- Subphylum: Chelicerata
- Class: Arachnida
- Order: Araneae
- Infraorder: Araneomorphae
- Family: Nesticidae
- Genus: Pseudonesticus; Li

Type species
- Pseudonesticus clavatus

Species
- 6, see text

Genus of spiders

Pseudonesticus is a genus of spiders in the family Nesticidae. It was first described in 2013 by Liu & Li. As of 2017, it contains 6 species, all from China.

== Species ==
Pseudonesticus comprises the following species:

- Pseudonesticus clavatus Liu & Li, 2013
- Pseudonesticus dafangensis Lin, Ballarin & Li, 2016
- Pseudonesticus miao Lin, Ballarin & Li, 2016
- Pseudonesticus spinosus Lin, Ballarin & Li, 2016
- Pseudonesticus wumengensis Lin, Ballarin & Li, 2016
- Pseudonesticus ziyunensis Lin, Ballarin & Li, 2016
