= Wraios =

Scientific classification
- Domain: Eukaryota
- Kingdom: Animalia
- Phylum: Arthropoda
- Subphylum: Chelicerata
- Class: Arachnida
- Order: Araneae
- Infraorder: Araneomorphae
- Family: Nesticidae
- Genus: Wraios; Ballarin & Li, 2015

Species
- Wraios longiembolus Ballarin & Li, 2015

Genus of spiders

Wraios is a monotypic genus of spiders in the family Nesticidae. It was first described in 2015 by Ballarin & Li. Its sole species, Wraios longiembolus, occurs in China.
