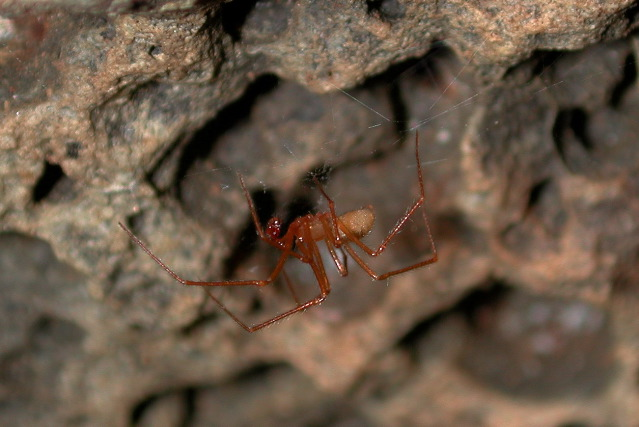
- male Nesticus sp.

Scientific classification
- Kingdom: Animalia
- Phylum: Arthropoda
- Subphylum: Chelicerata
- Class: Arachnida
- Order: Araneae
- Infraorder: Araneomorphae
- Family: Nesticidae
- Genus: Nesticus; Thorell, 1869

Type species
- Nesticus cellulanus Clerck, 1757

Species
- 125, see text

Synonyms
- Ivesia, Petrunkevitch, 1925; Tuganobia, Chamberlin, 1933

= Nesticus =

Genus of spiders

Nesticus is a genus of American and Eurasian scaffold web spiders first described by Tamerlan Thorell in 1869.

== Species ==
As of March 2022 it contains the following species:

- Nesticus abukumanus Yaginuma, 1979 — Japan
- Nesticus acrituberculum Kim, Yoo, Lee, Lee, Choi & Lim, 2014 — Korea
- Nesticus afghanus Roewer, 1962 — Afghanistan
- Nesticus akamai Yaginuma, 1979 — Japan
- Nesticus akiensis Yaginuma, 1979 — Japan
- Nesticus akiyoshiensis (Uyemura, 1941) — Japan
  - Nesticus akiyoshiensis ofuku Yaginuma, 1977 — Japan
- Nesticus ambiguus Denis, 1950 — Tanzania
- Nesticus anagamianus Yaginuma, 1976 — Japan
- Nesticus antillanus Bryant, 1940 — Cuba
- Nesticus archeri Gertsch, 1984 — USA
- Nesticus arganoi Brignoli, 1972 — Mexico
- Nesticus asuwanus Nishikawa, 1986 — Japan
- Nesticus bacchus Estol & Rodrigues, 2017 — Brazil
- Nesticus balacescui Dumitrescu, 1979 — Romania
- Nesticus barri Gertsch, 1984 — USA
- Nesticus barrowsi Gertsch, 1984 — USA
- Nesticus bishopi Gertsch, 1984 — USA
- Nesticus brasiliensis Brignoli, 1979 — Brazil
- Nesticus breviscapus Yaginuma, 1979 — Japan
- Nesticus brignolii Ott & Lise, 2002 — Brazil, Uruguay, Argentina
- Nesticus brimleyi Gertsch, 1984 — USA
- Nesticus bungonus Yaginuma, 1979 — Japan
- Nesticus calilegua Ott & Lise, 2002 — Brazil, Argentina
- Nesticus campus Gertsch, 1984 — Mexico
- Nesticus carolinensis (Bishop, 1950) — USA
- Nesticus carpaticus Dumitrescu, 1979 — Romania
- Nesticus carteri Emerton, 1875 — USA
- Nesticus caverna Gertsch, 1984 — Mexico
- Nesticus cellulanus (Clerck, 1757) — Holarctic
  - Nesticus cellulanus affinis Kulczynski, 1894 — Slovakia, Romania
- Nesticus cernensis Dumitrescu, 1979 — Romania
- Nesticus chikunii Yaginuma, 1980 — Japan
- Nesticus citrinus (Taczanowski, 1874) — Guyana
- Nesticus concolor Roewer, 1962 — Afghanistan
- Nesticus constantinescui Dumitrescu, 1979 — Romania
- Nesticus cooperi Gertsch, 1984 — USA
- Nesticus coreanus Paik & Namkung, 1969 — Korea
- Nesticus crosbyi Gertsch, 1984 — USA
- Nesticus delfini (Simon, 1904) — Chile
- Nesticus diaconui Dumitrescu, 1979 — Romania
- Nesticus dilutus Gertsch, 1984 — USA
- Nesticus echigonus Yaginuma, 1986 — Japan
- Nesticus flavidus Paik, 1978 — Korea
- Nesticus furenensis Yaginuma, 1979 — Japan
- Nesticus furtivus Gertsch, 1984 — USA
- Nesticus gastropodus Kim & Ye, 2014 — Korea
- Nesticus georgia Gertsch, 1984 — USA
- Nesticus gertschi Coyle & McGarity, 1992 — USA
- Nesticus gondai Yaginuma, 1979 — Japan
- Nesticus gujoensis Yaginuma, 1979 — Japan
- Nesticus higoensis Yaginuma, 1977 — Japan
- Nesticus hoffmanni Gertsch, 1971 — Mexico
- Nesticus holsingeri Gertsch, 1984 — USA
- Nesticus inconcinnus Simon, 1907 — São Tomé
- Nesticus ionescui Dumitrescu, 1979 — Romania
- Nesticus iriei Yaginuma, 1979 — Japan
- Nesticus ivone Faleiro & Santos, 2011 — Brazil
- Nesticus iwatensis Yaginuma, 1979 — Japan
- Nesticus jamesoni Gertsch, 1984 — Mexico
- Nesticus jonesi Gertsch, 1984 — USA
- Nesticus kaiensis Yaginuma, 1979 — Japan
- Nesticus karyuensis Yaginuma, 1980 — Japan
- Nesticus kataokai Yaginuma, 1979 — Japan
- Nesticus kunisakiensis Irie, 1999 — Japan
- Nesticus kuriko Yaginuma, 1972 — Japan
- Nesticus kyongkeomsanensis Namkung, 2002 — Korea
- Nesticus latiscapus Yaginuma, 1972 — Japan
  - Nesticus latiscapus kosodensis Yaginuma, 1972 — Japan
- Nesticus lindbergi Roewer, 1962 — Afghanistan
- Nesticus longiscapus Yaginuma, 1976 — Japan
  - Nesticus longiscapus awa Yaginuma, 1978 — Japan
  - Nesticus longiscapus draco Yaginuma, 1978 — Japan
  - Nesticus longiscapus kiuchii Yaginuma, 1978 — Japan
- Nesticus maculatus Bryant, 1948 — Hispaniola
- Nesticus masudai Yaginuma, 1979 — Japan
- Nesticus mikawanus Yaginuma, 1979 — Japan
- Nesticus mimus Gertsch, 1984 — USA
- Nesticus monticola Yaginuma, 1979 — Japan
- Nesticus nahuanus Gertsch, 1971 — Mexico
- Nesticus nasicus Coyle & McGarity, 1992 — USA
- Nesticus nishikawai Yaginuma, 1979 — Japan
- Nesticus noroensis Mashibara, 1993 — Japan
- Nesticus orghidani Dumitrescu, 1979 — Romania
- Nesticus paynei Gertsch, 1984 — USA
- Nesticus pecki Hedin & Dellinger, 2005 — USA
- Nesticus plesai Dumitrescu, 1980 — Romania
- Nesticus potreiro Ott & Lise, 2002 — Brazil
- Nesticus potterius (Chamberlin, 1933) — USA
- Nesticus rainesi Gertsch, 1984 — Mexico
- Nesticus rakanus Yaginuma, 1976 — Japan
- Nesticus ramirezi Ott & Lise, 2002 — Argentina
- Nesticus reclusus Gertsch, 1984 — USA
- Nesticus reddelli Gertsch, 1984 — Mexico
- Nesticus salta Torres, Pardo, González-Reyes, Rodríguez Artigas & Corronca, 2016 — Argentina
- Nesticus secretus Gertsch, 1984 — USA
- Nesticus sedatus Gertsch, 1984 — Mexico
- Nesticus sheari Gertsch, 1984 — USA
- Nesticus shinkaii Yaginuma, 1979 — Japan
- Nesticus shureiensis Yaginuma, 1980 — Japan
- Nesticus silvanus Gertsch, 1984 — USA
- Nesticus silvestrii Fage, 1929 — USA
- Nesticus sodanus Gertsch, 1984 — USA
- Nesticus sonei Yaginuma, 1981 — Japan
- Nesticus stupkai Gertsch, 1984 — USA
- Nesticus stygius Gertsch, 1984 — USA
- Nesticus suzuka Yaginuma, 1979 — Japan
- Nesticus taim Ott & Lise, 2002 — Brazil
- Nesticus takachiho Yaginuma, 1979 — Japan
- Nesticus tarumii Yaginuma, 1979 — Japan
- Nesticus tennesseensis (Petrunkevitch, 1925) — USA
- Nesticus tosa Yaginuma, 1976 — Japan
  - Nesticus tosa iwaya Yaginuma, 1976 — Japan
  - Nesticus tosa niyodo Yaginuma, 1976 — Japan
- Nesticus unicolor Simon, 1895 — Venezuela
- Nesticus utatsuensis Tanikawa & Yawata, 2013 — Japan
- Nesticus vazquezae Gertsch, 1971 — Mexico
- Nesticus wiehlei Dumitrescu, 1979 — Romania
- Nesticus yaginumai Irie, 1987 — Japan
- Nesticus yamagatensis Yoshida, 1989 — Japan
- Nesticus yamato Yaginuma, 1979 — Japan
- Nesticus yeongchigulensis Kim, Ye & Kim, 2016 — Korea
- Nesticus yesoensis Yaginuma, 1979 — Japan
- Nesticus zenjoensis Yaginuma, 1978 — Japan
