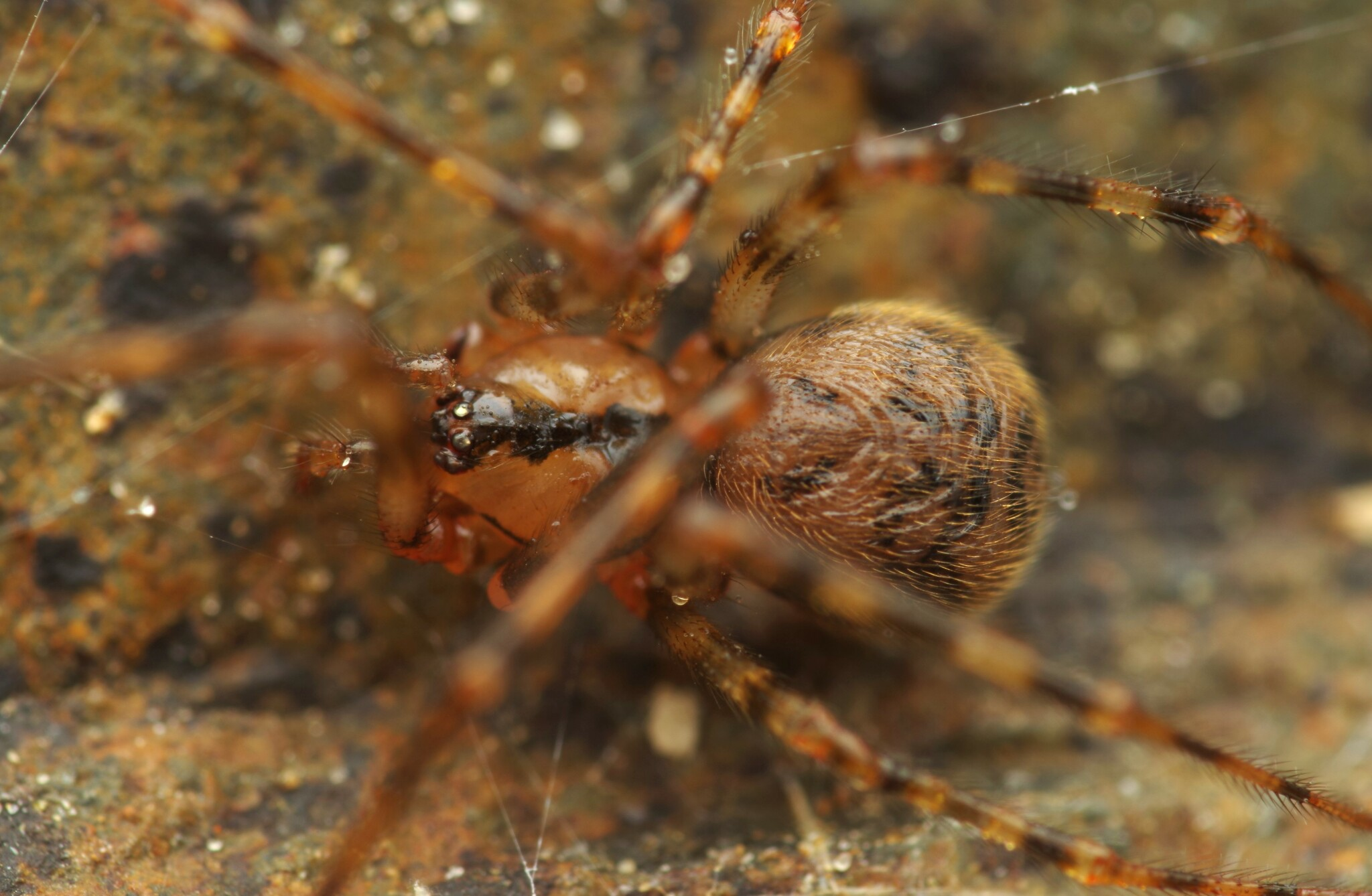
- Nesticus cellulanus
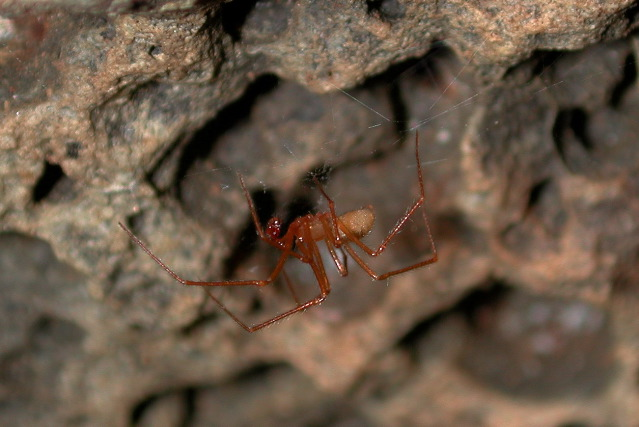
- male Nesticus sp.

Scientific classification
- Kingdom: Animalia
- Phylum: Arthropoda
- Subphylum: Chelicerata
- Class: Arachnida
- Order: Araneae
- Infraorder: Araneomorphae
- Family: Nesticidae; Simon, 1894

Diversity
- 16 genera, 292 species
- blue: reported countries (WSC) green: observation hotspots (iNaturalist)

= Scaffold web spider =

Scaffold web spiders Temporal range: Palaeogene–present

Family of spiders

Scaffold web spiders or cave cobweb spiders (Nesticidae) are a family of araneomorph spiders closely allied with tangle-web spiders (Theridiidae). Like the Theridiidae, these spiders have a comb of serrated bristles on the hind tarsi that are used to pull silk bands from the spinnerets. Nesticidae contains 16 genera and about 300 species, many of which are associated with caves or overhangs.

The genus Nesticus is the type for the family and is found throughout the world. The related Eidmannella has speciated considerably in Texas caves and includes some extremely localized species that are considered threatened. One species, Eidmannella pallida, is found in caves and under overhangs, but also in agricultural fields and other habitats away from such restricted areas. The genus Carpathonesticus is found in central Eurasia.

== Genera ==
As of January 2026, this family includes sixteen genera and 292 species:

- Aituaria Esyunin & Efimik, 1998 – Georgia, Iran, Turkey, Ukraine, Russia
- Canarionesticus Wunderlich, 1992 – Canary Islands
- Carpathonesticus Lehtinen & Saaristo, 1980 – Georgia, Romania, Ukraine, Russia
- Cyclocarcina Kishida, 1942 – Japan
- Daginesticus Fomichev, Ballarin & Marusik, 2022 – Georgia, Russia
- Domitius Ribera, 2018 – Italy, Portugal, Spain
- Eidmannella Roewer, 1935 – Mexico, United States, Argentina, Brazil. Introduced to Japan, Israel, Italy, Macaronesia, Spain, France, Galapagos, Pacific Islands, Britain
- Howaia Lehtinen & Saaristo, 1980 – China, Japan, Korea. Introduced to St. Helena, Azerbaijan, Pacific islands
- Kryptonesticus Pavlek & Ribera, 2017 – Southern Europe. Introduced to New Zealand
- Nesticella Lehtinen & Saaristo, 1980 – Africa, Asia, Russia, Oceania, Brazil
- Nesticus Thorell, 1869 – São Tomé and Príncipe, Tanzania, Afghanistan, Japan, Korea, Caucasus, Turkey, Slovakia, Romania, North to South America
- Pseudonesticus Liu & Li, 2013 – China
- Sacarum Esyunin & Efimik, 2022 – Russia
- Speleoticus Ballarin & Li, 2016 – China, Japan
- Typhlonesticus Kulczyński, 1914 – Turkey, Alps, Southern Europe, North America
- Wraios Ballarin & Li, 2015 – China

The following extinct genera have been placed in the Nesticidae:

- †Balticonesticus Wunderlich, 1986 – Palaeogene, Baltic amber
- †Eopopino Petrunkevitch, 1942 – Palaeogene, Baltic and Bitterfeld amber
- †Heteronesticus Wunderlich, 1986 – Palaeogene, Baltic amber
- †Hispanonesticus Wunderlich, 1986 – Neogene, Dominican amber
