= List of Cybaeidae species =

List of spider species

This page lists all described species of the spider family Cybaeidae accepted by the World Spider Catalog as of February 2021:

== A ==
=== Allocybaeina ===
Allocybaeina Bennett, 2020

- A. littlewalteri Bennett, 2020 (type) — USA

== B ==
=== Blabomma ===
Blabomma Chamberlin & Ivie, 1937

- B. californicum (Simon, 1895) (type) — USA
- B. flavipes Chamberlin & Ivie, 1937 — USA
- B. foxi Chamberlin & Ivie, 1937 — USA
- B. guttatum Chamberlin & Ivie, 1937 — USA
- B. hexops Chamberlin & Ivie, 1937 — USA
- B. lahondae (Chamberlin & Ivie, 1937) — USA
- B. oregonense Chamberlin & Ivie, 1937 — USA
- B. sanctum Chamberlin & Ivie, 1937 — USA
- B. sylvicola (Chamberlin & Ivie, 1937) — USA
- B. uenoi Paik & Yaginuma, 1969 — Korea
- B. yosemitense Chamberlin & Ivie, 1937 — USA

== C ==
=== Calymmaria ===
Calymmaria Chamberlin & Ivie, 1937

- C. alleni Heiss & Draney, 2004 — USA
- C. aspenola Chamberlin & Ivie, 1942 — USA
- C. bifurcata Heiss & Draney, 2004 — USA
- C. californica (Banks, 1896) — USA
- C. carmel Heiss & Draney, 2004 — USA
- C. emertoni (Simon, 1897) — USA, Canada
- C. farallon Heiss & Draney, 2004 — USA
- C. gertschi Heiss & Draney, 2004 — USA
- C. humboldi Heiss & Draney, 2004 — USA
- C. iviei Heiss & Draney, 2004 — USA
- C. lora Chamberlin & Ivie, 1942 — USA
- C. minuta Heiss & Draney, 2004 — USA
- C. monicae Chamberlin & Ivie, 1937 (type) — USA
- C. monterey Heiss & Draney, 2004 — USA
- C. nana (Simon, 1897) — USA, Canada
- C. orick Heiss & Draney, 2004 — USA
- C. persica (Hentz, 1847) — USA
- C. rosario Heiss & Draney, 2004 — Mexico
- C. rothi Heiss & Draney, 2004 — USA
- C. scotia Heiss & Draney, 2004 — USA
- C. sequoia Heiss & Draney, 2004 — USA
- C. shastae Chamberlin & Ivie, 1937 — USA
- C. sierra Heiss & Draney, 2004 — USA
- C. similaria Heiss & Draney, 2004 — USA
- C. siskiyou Heiss & Draney, 2004 — USA
- C. sueni Heiss & Draney, 2004 — USA
- C. suprema Chamberlin & Ivie, 1937 — USA, Canada
- C. tecate Heiss & Draney, 2004 — Mexico
- C. tubera Heiss & Draney, 2004 — USA
- C. virginica Heiss & Draney, 2004 — USA
- C. yolandae Heiss & Draney, 2004 — USA

=== Cedicoides ===
Cedicoides Charitonov, 1946

- C. maerens (Simon, 1889) — Turkmenistan
- C. parthus (Fet, 1993) — Turkmenistan
- C. pavlovskyi (Spassky, 1941) — Tajikistan
- C. simoni (Charitonov, 1946) (type) — Uzbekistan

=== Cedicus ===
Cedicus Simon, 1875

- C. bucculentus Simon, 1889 — Himalayas
- C. dubius Strand, 1907 — Japan
- C. flavipes Simon, 1875 (type) — Eastern Mediterranean
- C. israeliensis Levy, 1996 — Turkey, Israel
- C. pumilus Thorell, 1895 — Myanmar

=== Cryphoeca ===
Cryphoeca Thorell, 1870

- C. angularis Saito, 1934 — Japan
- C. brignolii Thaler, 1980 — Switzerland, Italy
- C. carpathica Herman, 1879 — Eastern Europe
- C. exlineae Roth, 1988 — USA
- C. lichenum L. Koch, 1876 — Germany, Austria
  - C. l. nigerrima Thaler, 1978 — Germany, Austria
- C. montana Emerton, 1909 — USA, Canada
- C. nivalis Schenkel, 1919 — Switzerland, Austria, Italy
- C. pirini (Drensky, 1921) — Bulgaria
- C. shingoi Ono, 2007 — Japan
- C. shinkaii Ono, 2007 — Japan
- C. silvicola (C. L. Koch, 1834) (type) — Europe, Turkey, Russia (Europe to Far East), Japan
- C. thaleri Wunderlich, 1995 — Turkey

=== Cryphoecina ===
Cryphoecina Deltshev, 1997

- C. deelemanae Deltshev, 1997 (type) — Montenegro

=== Cybaeina ===
Cybaeina Chamberlin & Ivie, 1932

- C. confusa Chamberlin & Ivie, 1942 — USA
- C. minuta (Banks, 1906) (type) — USA
- C. sequoia Roth, 1952 — USA
- C. xantha Chamberlin & Ivie, 1937 — USA

=== Cybaeota ===
Cybaeota Chamberlin & Ivie, 1933

- C. calcarata (Emerton, 1911) (type) — USA, Canada
- C. munda Chamberlin & Ivie, 1937 — USA
- C. nana Chamberlin & Ivie, 1937 — USA, Canada
- C. shastae Chamberlin & Ivie, 1937 — USA
- C. wesolowskae Marusik, Omelko & Koponen, 2020 — Russia (Far East)

=== Cybaeozyga ===
Cybaeozyga Chamberlin & Ivie, 1937

- C. heterops Chamberlin & Ivie, 1937 (type) — USA

=== Cybaeus ===
Cybaeus

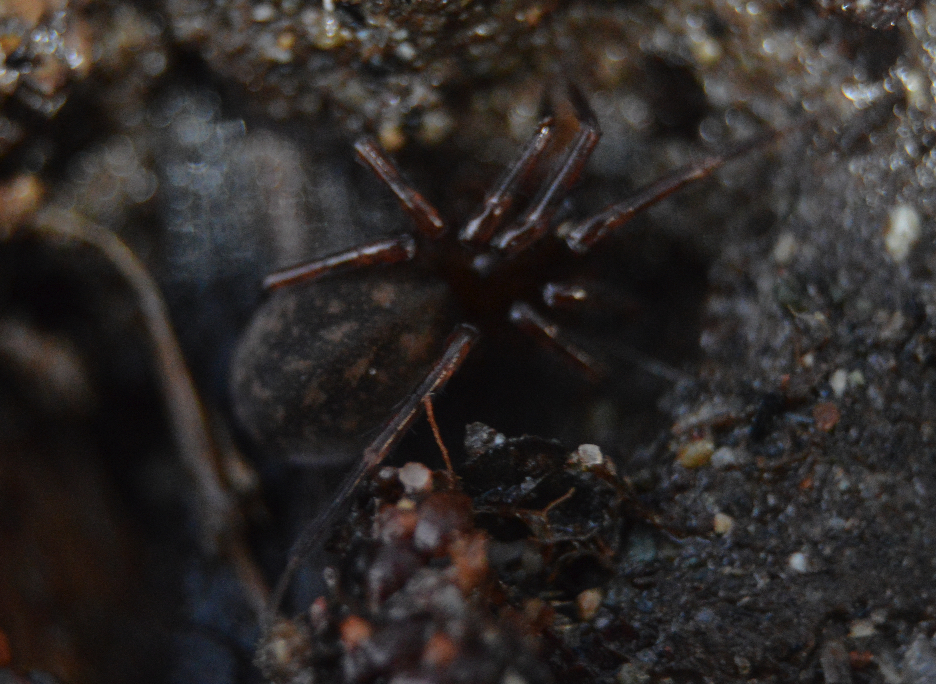
Cybaeus sp.

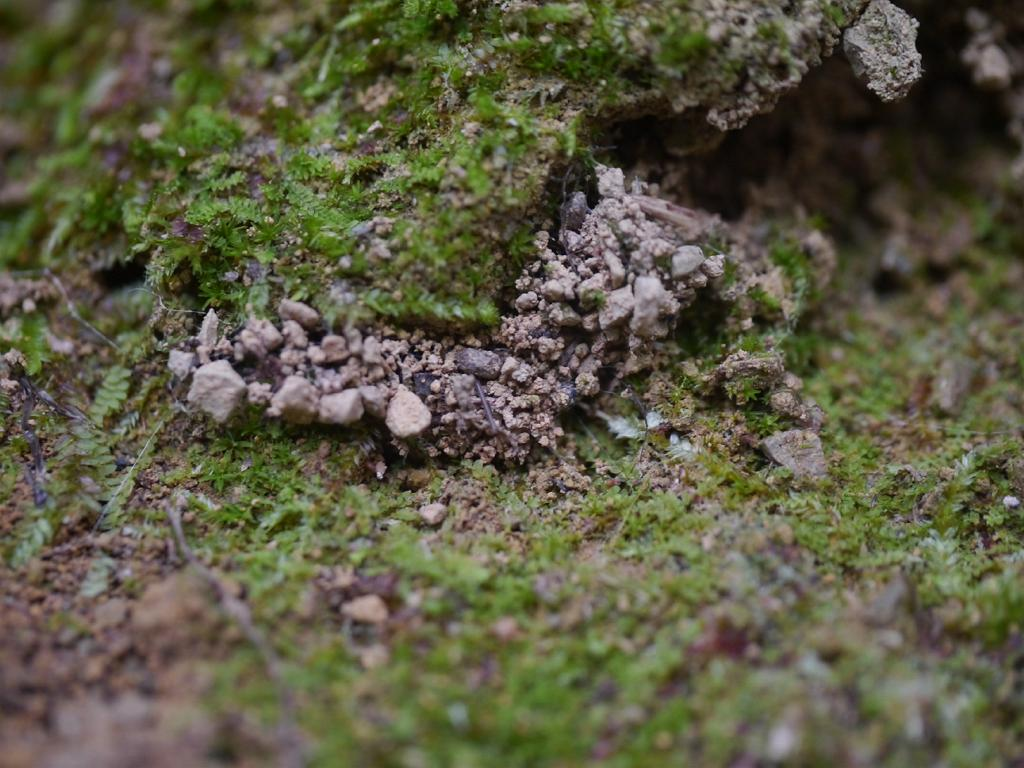
Cybaeus nest

Cybaeus L. Koch, 1868

- C. abchasicus Charitonov, 1947 — Turkey, Caucasus (Russia, Georgia)
- C. adenes Chamberlin & Ivie, 1932 — USA
- C. aikana Ihara, Koike & Nakano, 2021 — Japan (Ryukyu Is.)
- C. aizuensis Kobayashi, 2006 — Japan
- C. akaanaensis (Komatsu, 1968) — Japan
- C. akiensis Ihara, 2003 — Japan
- C. amamiensis Ihara, Koike & Nakano, 2021 — Japan (Ryukyu Is.)
- C. amicus Chamberlin & Ivie, 1932 — USA
- C. anaiwaensis (Komatsu, 1968) — Japan
- C. angustiarum L. Koch, 1868 — Europe, Azerbaijan?, Iran?
- C. aokii Yaginuma, 1972 — Japan
- C. aquilonalis Yaginuma, 1958 — China, Japan
- C. aratrum Kim & Kim, 2008 — Korea
- C. asahi Kobayashi, 2006 — Japan
- C. ashikitaensis (Komatsu, 1968) — Japan
- C. aspenicolens Chamberlin & Ivie, 1932 — USA
- C. auburn Bennett, 2019 — USA
- C. auriculatus Seo, 2017 — Korea
- C. balkanus Deltshev, 1997 — Bulgaria, Serbia, North Macedonia
- C. bam Marusik & Logunov, 1991 — Russia (Kurile Is.)
- C. basarukini Marusik & Logunov, 1991 — Russia (Sakhalin)
- C. bitchuensis Ihara & Nojima, 2005 — Japan
- C. biwaensis Kobayashi, 2006 — Japan
- C. blasbes Chamberlin & Ivie, 1932 — USA
- C. brignolii Maurer, 1992 — Turkey
- C. broni Caporiacco, 1934 — Karakorum
- C. bulbosus Exline, 1935 — USA
- C. cascadius Roth, 1952 — USA
- C. charlesi Bennett, 2016 — USA, Canada
- C. chauliodous Bennett, 2009 — USA
- C. communis Yaginuma, 1972 — Japan
- C. confrantis Oliger, 1994 — Russia (Far East)
- C. conservans Chamberlin & Ivie, 1932 — USA
- C. consocius Chamberlin & Ivie, 1932 — USA
- C. constrictus Chamberlin & Ivie, 1942 — USA
- C. coylei Bennett, 2021 — USA
- C. cribelloides Chamberlin & Ivie, 1932 — USA
- C. cylisteus Zhu & Wang, 1992 — China
- C. daimonji Matsuda, Ihara & Nakano, 2020 — Japan
- C. daisen Ihara & Nojima, 2005 — Japan
- C. deletroneus Zhu & Wang, 1992 — China
- C. desmaeus Zhu & Wang, 1992 — China
- C. devius Chamberlin & Ivie, 1942 — USA
- C. echigo Kobayashi, 2006 — Japan
- C. echinaceus Zhu & Wang, 1992 — China
- C. enshu Kobayashi, 2006 — Japan
- C. eutypus Chamberlin & Ivie, 1932 — USA, Canada
- C. fraxineus Bennett, 2021 — USA
- C. fujisanus Yaginuma, 1972 — Japan
- C. fuujinensis (Komatsu, 1968) — Japan
- C. gassan Kobayashi, 2006 — Japan
- C. geumensis Seo, 2016 — Korea
- C. gidneyi Bennett, 2009 — USA
- C. giganteus Banks, 1892 — USA
- C. gonokawa Ihara, 1993 — Japan
- C. gotoensis (Yamaguchi & Yaginuma, 1971) — Japan
- C. grizzlyi Schenkel, 1950 — USA
- C. harrietae Bennett, 2016 — USA
- C. hatsushibai Ihara, 2005 — Japan
- C. hesper Chamberlin & Ivie, 1932 — USA
- C. hibaensis Ihara, 1994 — Japan
- C. higoensis Irie & Ono, 2000 — Japan
- C. hikidai Ihara, Koike & Nakano, 2021 — Japan (Ryukyu Is.)
- C. hiroshimaensis Ihara, 1993 — Japan
- C. ilweolensis Seo, 2016 — Korea
- C. inagakii Ono, 2008 — Japan
- C. intermedius Maurer, 1992 — France, Switzerland, Italy
- C. ishikawai (Kishida, 1940) — Japan
- C. itsukiensis Irie, 1998 — Japan
- C. jaanaensis Komatsu, 1968 — Japan
- C. jilinensis Song, Kim & Zhu, 1993 — China
- C. jinsekiensis Ihara, 2006 — Japan
- C. jiriensis Seo, 2016 — Korea
- C. jogyensis Seo, 2016 — Korea
- C. kawabensis Irie & Ono, 2002 — Japan
- C. kiiensis Kobayashi, 2006 — Japan
- C. kirigaminensis Komatsu, 1963 — Japan
- C. kiuchii Komatsu, 1965 — Japan
- C. kodama Ihara, Koike & Nakano, 2021 — Japan (Ryukyu Is.)
- C. kokuraensis Ihara, 2007 — Japan
- C. kompiraensis (Komatsu, 1968) — Japan
- C. kumadori Ihara, Koike & Nakano, 2021 — Japan (Ryukyu Is.)
- C. kumaensis Irie & Ono, 2001 — Japan
- C. kunashirensis Marusik & Logunov, 1991 — Russia (Sakhalin, Kurile Is.), Japan
- C. kunisakiensis Ihara, 2003 — Japan
- C. kuramotoi Yaginuma, 1963 — Japan
- C. longus Paik, 1966 — Korea
- C. maculosus Yaginuma, 1972 — Japan
- C. magnus Yaginuma, 1958 — Japan
- C. melanoparvus Kobayashi, 2006 — Japan
- C. mellotteei (Simon, 1886) — Japan
- C. mimasaka Ihara & Nojima, 2005 — Japan
- C. minoensis Kobayashi, 2006 — Japan
- C. minor Chyzer, 1897 — Europe
- C. miyagiensis Ihara, 2004 — Japan
- C. miyosii Yaginuma, 1941 — Japan
- C. momotaro Ihara & Nojima, 2005 — Japan
- C. montanus Maurer, 1992 — Switzerland, Italy
- C. monticola Kobayashi, 2006 — Japan
- C. morosus Simon, 1886 — USA, Canada
- C. mosanensis Paik & Namkung, 1967 — Korea
- C. multnoma Chamberlin & Ivie, 1942 — USA
- C. nagaiae Ihara, 2010 — Japan
- C. nagusa Ihara, 2010 — Japan
- C. nichikoensis (Komatsu, 1968) — Japan
- C. nipponicus (Uyemura, 1938) — Japan
- C. nishikawai (Komatsu, 1968) — Japan
- C. nojimai Ihara, 1993 — Japan
- C. obedientiarius Komatsu, 1963 — Japan
- C. odaensis Seo, 2016 — Korea
- C. okafujii Yaginuma, 1963 — Japan
- C. okayamaensis Ihara, 1993 — Japan
- C. okumae Ihara, 2010 — Japan
- C. okumurai Ihara, Koike & Nakano, 2021 — Japan (Ryukyu Is.)
- C. paralypropriapus Bennett, 2009 — USA
- C. parvus Seo, 2017 — Korea
- C. patritus Bishop & Crosby, 1926 — USA
- C. pearcei Bennett, 2019 — USA
- C. penedentatus Bennett, 2009 — USA
- C. perditus Chamberlin & Ivie, 1932 — USA
- C. petegarinus Yaginuma, 1972 — Japan
- C. rarispinosus Yaginuma, 1970 — Japan
- C. raymondi (Simon, 1916) — Pyrenees (Spain, France)
- C. reducens Chamberlin & Ivie, 1932 — USA
- C. reticulatus Simon, 1886 — USA, Canada
- C. rothi Bennett, 2016 — USA
- C. ryunoiwayaensis Komatsu, 1968 — Japan
- C. ryusenensis (Komatsu, 1968) — Japan
- C. sanbruno Bennett, 2009 — USA
- C. sanctus (Komatsu, 1942) — Japan
- C. sasakii Ihara, 2004 — Japan
- C. sasayamaensis Ihara, 2010 — Japan
- C. schusteri Bennett, 2019 — USA
- C. scopulatus Chamberlin & Ivie, 1942 — USA
- C. senzokuensis (Komatsu, 1968) — Japan
- C. seorakensis Seo, 2016 — Korea
- C. septatus Chamberlin & Ivie, 1942 — USA
- C. shingenni Komatsu, 1968 — Japan
- C. shinkaii (Komatsu, 1970) — Japan
- C. shoshoneus Chamberlin & Ivie, 1932 — USA
- C. signatus Keyserling, 1881 — Peru
- C. signifer Simon, 1886 — USA, Canada
- C. silicis Barrows, 1919 — USA
- C. simplex Roth, 1952 — USA
- C. sinuosus Fox, 1937 — Canada
- C. solanum Bennett, 2016 — USA
- C. somesbar Bennett, 2009 — USA
- C. songniensis Seo, 2016 — Korea
- C. strandi Kolosváry, 1934 — Romania
- C. striatipes Bösenberg & Strand, 1906 — Russia (Sakhalin, Kurile Is.), Japan
- C. tajimaensis Ihara & Nojima, 2005 — Japan
- C. takachihoensis Irie & Ono, 2010 — Japan
- C. takasawaensis (Komatsu, 1970) — Japan
- C. taraensis Irie & Ono, 2001 — Japan
- C. tardatus (Chamberlin, 1919) — USA
- C. tetricus (C. L. Koch, 1839) (type) — Europe
- C. thermydrinos Bennett, 2009 — USA
- C. tokunoshimensis Ihara, Koike & Nakano, 2021 — Japan (Ryukyu Is.)
- C. torosus Bennett, 2019 — USA
- C. tottoriensis Ihara, 1994 — Japan
- C. triangulus Paik, 1966 — Korea
- C. tsurugi Ihara, 2003 — Japan
- C. tsurusakii Ihara, 1993 — Japan
- C. uenoi (Yaginuma, 1970) — Japan
- C. urabandai Ihara, 2004 — Japan
- C. vignai Brignoli, 1977 — France, Italy
- C. vulpinus Bennett, 2009 — USA
- C. waynei Bennett, 2009 — USA
- C. whanseunensis Paik & Namkung, 1967 — Korea
- C. yakushimensis Ihara, Koike & Nakano, 2021 — Japan (Ryukyu Is.)
- C. yoshiakii Yaginuma, 1968 — Japan
- C. yoshidai Ihara, 2004 — Japan
- C. yufuin Ihara, 2007 — Japan
- C. zenifukiensis (Komatsu, 1968) — Japan

== D ==
=== Dirksia ===
Dirksia Chamberlin & Ivie, 1942

- D. cinctipes (Banks, 1896) (type) — USA
- D. pyrenaea (Simon, 1898) — France

== E ==
=== Ethobuella ===
Ethobuella Chamberlin & Ivie, 1937

- E. hespera Chamberlin & Ivie, 1937 — USA
- E. tuonops Chamberlin & Ivie, 1937 (type) — USA, Canada

== L ==
=== † Lutetiana ===
† Lutetiana Selden and Wappler, 2019

- † L. neli Selden and Wappler, 2019 (type) — Eocene Lutetian Messel lacustrine sediments, Germany

== N ==
=== Neocryphoeca ===
Neocryphoeca Roth, 1970

- N. beattyi Roth, 1970 — USA
- N. gertschi Roth, 1970 (type) — USA

== P ==
=== Paracedicus ===
Paracedicus Fet, 1993

- P. baram Levy, 2007 — Israel
- P. darvishi Mirshamsi, 2018 — Iran
- P. ephthalitus (Fet, 1993) (type) — Turkmenistan
- P. feti Marusik & Guseinov, 2003 — Azerbaijan
- P. gennadii (Fet, 1993) — Iran, Turkmenistan
- P. geshur Levy, 2007 — Israel
- P. kasatkini Zamani & Marusik, 2017 — Iran

== S ==
=== Symposia ===
Symposia Simon, 1898

- S. bifurca Roth, 1967 — Venezuela
- S. columbiana Müller & Heimer, 1988 — Colombia
- S. dubiosa Roth, 1967 — Venezuela
- S. sexoculata Roth, 1967 — Venezuela
- S. silvicola Simon, 1898 (type) — Venezuela
- S. umbrosa Simon, 1898 — Venezuela

== T ==
=== Tuberta ===
Tuberta Simon, 1884

- T. maerens (O. Pickard-Cambridge, 1863) (type) — Britain, France, Switzerland, Belgium, Germany, Croatia, Bulgaria, Turkey, Azerbaijan
- T. mirabilis (Thorell, 1871) — Italy

== V ==
=== Vagellia ===
Vagellia Simon, 1899

- V. helveola Simon, 1899 (type) — Indonesia (Sumatra)

== W ==
=== Willisus ===
Willisus Roth, 1981

- W. gertschi Roth, 1981 (type) — USA

== Y ==
=== Yorima ===
Yorima Chamberlin & Ivie, 1942

- Y. albida Roth, 1956 — USA
- Y. angelica Roth, 1956 — USA
- Y. antillana (Bryant, 1940) — Cuba
- Y. flava (Chamberlin & Ivie, 1937) — USA
- Y. sequoiae (Chamberlin & Ivie, 1937) (type) — USA
- Y. subflava Chamberlin & Ivie, 1942 — USA
