= Neocybaeina =

Scientific classification
- Kingdom: Animalia
- Phylum: Arthropoda
- Subphylum: Chelicerata
- Class: Arachnida
- Order: Araneae
- Infraorder: Araneomorphae
- Family: Cybaeidae
- Genus: Neocybaeina; Bennett, 2023

Type species
- Cybaeina xantha Chamberlin & Ivie, 1937

Species
- 2, see text

Genus of spiders

Neocybaeina is a genus of spiders in the family Cybaeidae.

== Distribution ==
Neocybaeina is endemic to the United States.

All described N. burnetti specimens were collected in late September and early October 1959 in Curry County, coastal southwestern Oregon.

N. xantha has been collected in western Oregon, most recently in 1962.

== Etymology ==
The genus name is a combination of Greek "neo-" (new) and the related genus Cybaeina.

The species N. burnetti is named after the late blues musician, lyricist, and band leader Chester "Howlin' Wolf" Burnett.

== Taxonomy ==
The genus was erected in 2023 to accommodate the newly described species N. burnetti and a species previously described in genus Cybaeina.

== Species ==
As of October 2025, this genus includes two species:

- Neocybaeina burnetti Bennett, 2023 – United States
- Neocybaeina xantha (Chamberlin & Ivie, 1937) – United States (type species)
