= Guicybaeus =

Scientific classification
- Kingdom: Animalia
- Phylum: Arthropoda
- Subphylum: Chelicerata
- Class: Arachnida
- Order: Araneae
- Infraorder: Araneomorphae
- Family: Cybaeidae
- Genus: Guicybaeus; Wang, Chen, Yang & Zhang, 2023
- Species: G. shanyii

Binomial name
- Guicybaeus shanyii Wang, Chen, Yang & Zhang, 2023

Species of spider

Guicybaeus is a monotypic genus of spiders in the family Cybaeidae containing the single species, Guicybaeus shanyii.

== Distribution ==
Guicybaeus shanyii has only been recorded from Lipu in Guangxi, China.

== Etymology ==
The genus name is a combination of 桂; Guì, the abbreviation of Guangxi (from the name of former provincial capital Guilin), and related genus Cybaeus.

The species name honors Shan-Yi Zhou, a Chinese ant entomologist born in Lipu City.
