= Sincybaeus =

Scientific classification
- Kingdom: Animalia
- Phylum: Arthropoda
- Subphylum: Chelicerata
- Class: Arachnida
- Order: Araneae
- Infraorder: Araneomorphae
- Family: Cybaeidae
- Genus: Sincybaeus; Wang & Zhang, 2022

Type species
- S. liaoning Wang & Zhang, 2022

Species
- 4, see text

Genus of spiders

Sincybaeus is a genus of spiders in the family Cybaeidae.

== Distribution ==
Three of the described species are endemic to Japan, with one endemic to Liaoning, China.

== Etymology ==
The genus name is a combination of "Sin-" "China" and Cybaeus. The non-Chinese species were added to this genus in 2024.

S. liaoning is named after the type locality.

== Species ==
As of October 2025, this genus includes four species:

- Sincybaeus liaoning Wang & Zhang, 2022 – China (type species)
- Sincybaeus monticola (Kobayashi, 2006) – Japan
- Sincybaeus rarispinosus (Yaginuma, 1970) – Japan
- Sincybaeus yoshiakii (Yaginuma, 1968) – Japan
