= Rothaeina =

Scientific classification
- Kingdom: Animalia
- Phylum: Arthropoda
- Subphylum: Chelicerata
- Class: Arachnida
- Order: Araneae
- Infraorder: Araneomorphae
- Family: Cybaeidae
- Genus: Rothaeina; Bennett, 2023

Type species
- Cybaeina sequoia Roth, 1952

Species
- 5, see text

Genus of spiders

Rothaeina is a genus of spiders in the family Cybaeidae.

== Distribution ==
Rothaeina is known from the western United States (California, Oregon).

== Etymology ==
The genus name is a combination of arachnologist Vincent Daniel Roth (1924-1997) and the related genus Cybaeina, honoring Roth's lifelong interest in Nearctic Cybaeinae spiders. Roth is also the original describer of R. sequoia (as Cybaeina sequoia).

R. beaudini is named after Robb Bennett's son Beaudin A. Bennett (born 1985). R. jamesi honors Blues guitarist Elmore James (1918-1963). R. mackinleyi honors blues singer McKinley "Muddy Waters" Morganfield (1913-1983). R. petersoni is named after Canadian artist Ronald Alexander Miles Peterson.

== Species ==
As of October 2025, this genus includes five species:

- Rothaeina beaudini Bennett, 2023 – United States
- Rothaeina jamesi Bennett, 2023 – United States
- Rothaeina mackinleyi Bennett, 2023 – United States
- Rothaeina petersoni Bennett, 2023 – United States
- Rothaeina sequoia (Roth, 1952) – United States (type species)
