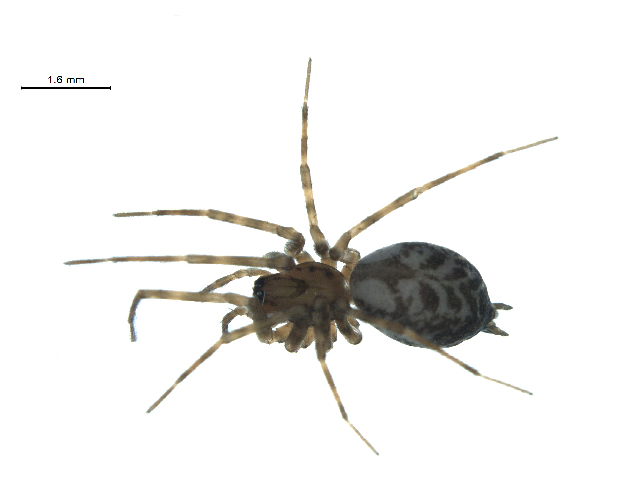
- C. nana, adult female
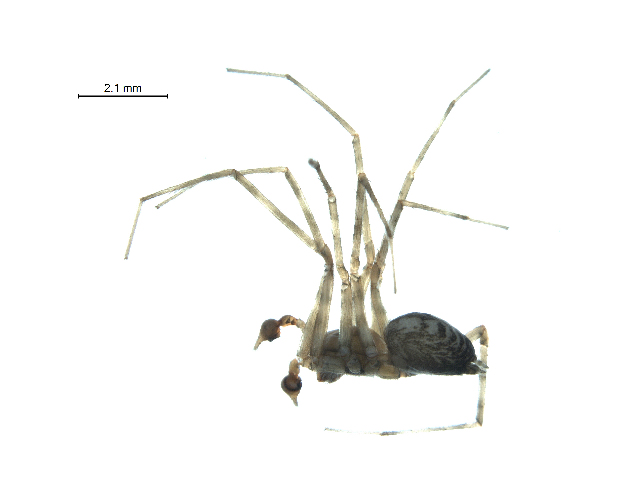
- C. nana, adult male

Scientific classification
- Kingdom: Animalia
- Phylum: Arthropoda
- Subphylum: Chelicerata
- Class: Arachnida
- Order: Araneae
- Infraorder: Araneomorphae
- Family: Cybaeidae
- Genus: Calymmaria
- Species: C. nana

Binomial name
- Calymmaria nana (Simon, 1897)

= Calymmaria nana =

Species of spider

Calymmaria nana is a species of true spider in the family Cybaeidae. It is found in the United States and Canada.
