= Cybaeus montanus =

Scientific classification
- Kingdom: Animalia
- Phylum: Arthropoda
- Subphylum: Chelicerata
- Class: Arachnida
- Order: Araneae
- Infraorder: Araneomorphae
- Family: Cybaeidae
- Genus: Cybaeus
- Species: C. montanus

Binomial name
- Cybaeus montanus Maurer, 1992

Species of spider

Cybaeus montanus is a spider species found in Switzerland and Italy.
