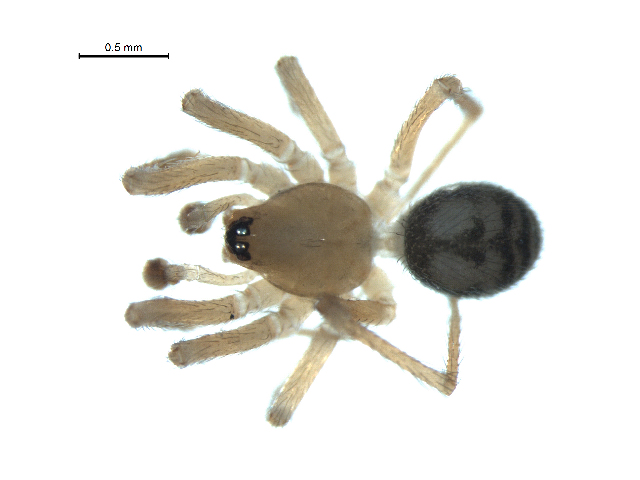
- C. shastae, adult male
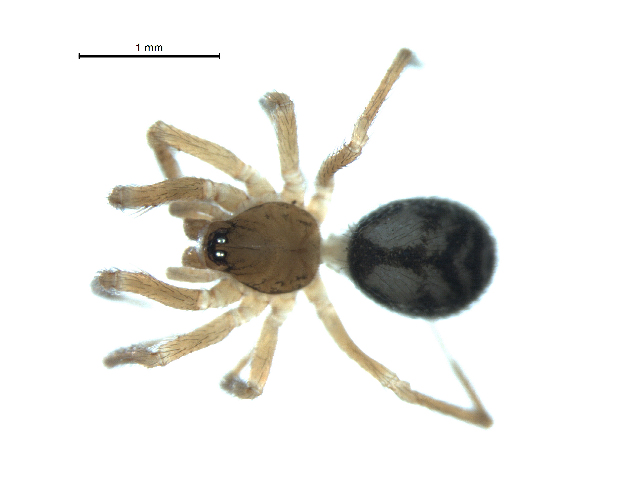
- C. shastae, adult female

Conservation status
- Secure (NatureServe)

Scientific classification
- Kingdom: Animalia
- Phylum: Arthropoda
- Subphylum: Chelicerata
- Class: Arachnida
- Order: Araneae
- Infraorder: Araneomorphae
- Family: Cybaeidae
- Genus: Cybaeota
- Species: C. shastae

Binomial name
- Cybaeota shastae Chamberlin & Ivie, 1937

= Cybaeota shastae =

Species of spider

Cybaeota shastae is a species of spider in the family Cybaeidae. It is found in the United States.
