= Cybaeus abchasicus =

Scientific classification
- Kingdom: Animalia
- Phylum: Arthropoda
- Subphylum: Chelicerata
- Class: Arachnida
- Order: Araneae
- Infraorder: Araneomorphae
- Family: Cybaeidae
- Genus: Cybaeus
- Species: C. abchasicus

Binomial name
- Cybaeus abchasicus Charitonov, 1947

Species of spider

Cybaeus abchasicus is a spider species found in Turkey, Georgia, and Russia. It lives in caves.
