= Calymmaria monicae =

Scientific classification
- Kingdom: Animalia
- Phylum: Arthropoda
- Subphylum: Chelicerata
- Class: Arachnida
- Order: Araneae
- Infraorder: Araneomorphae
- Family: Cybaeidae
- Genus: Calymmaria
- Species: C. monicae

Binomial name
- Calymmaria monicae Chamberlin & Ivie, 1937

Species of spider

Calymmaria monicae is a species of true spider in the family Cybaeidae. It is found in the United States.
