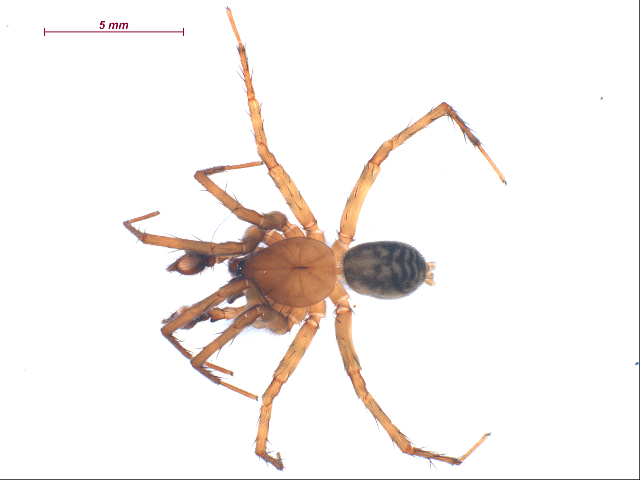
- Cybaeus eutypus, male

Conservation status
- Secure (NatureServe)

Scientific classification
- Kingdom: Animalia
- Phylum: Arthropoda
- Subphylum: Chelicerata
- Class: Arachnida
- Order: Araneae
- Infraorder: Araneomorphae
- Family: Cybaeidae
- Genus: Cybaeus
- Species: C. eutypus

Binomial name
- Cybaeus eutypus Chamberlin & Ivie, 1932

= Cybaeus eutypus =

Species of spider

Cybaeus eutypus is a species of spider in the family Cybaeidae. It is found in the United States and Canada.
