= Cybaeus balkanus =

Scientific classification
- Kingdom: Animalia
- Phylum: Arthropoda
- Subphylum: Chelicerata
- Class: Arachnida
- Order: Araneae
- Infraorder: Araneomorphae
- Family: Cybaeidae
- Genus: Cybaeus
- Species: C. balkanus

Binomial name
- Cybaeus balkanus Deltshev, 1997

Species of spider

Cybaeus balkanus is a spider species found in Serbia, Montenegro, Kosovo, North Macedonia, Bulgaria, and Greece.
