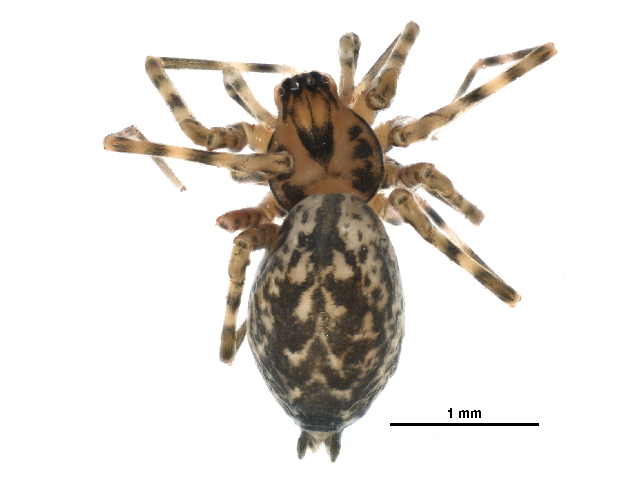
- C. emertoni from British Columbia

Scientific classification
- Kingdom: Animalia
- Phylum: Arthropoda
- Subphylum: Chelicerata
- Class: Arachnida
- Order: Araneae
- Infraorder: Araneomorphae
- Family: Cybaeidae
- Genus: Calymmaria
- Species: C. emertoni

Binomial name
- Calymmaria emertoni (Simon, 1897)

= Calymmaria emertoni =

Species of spider

Calymmaria emertoni is a species of true spider in the family Cybaeidae. It is found in the United States and Canada. It is a cave spider.
