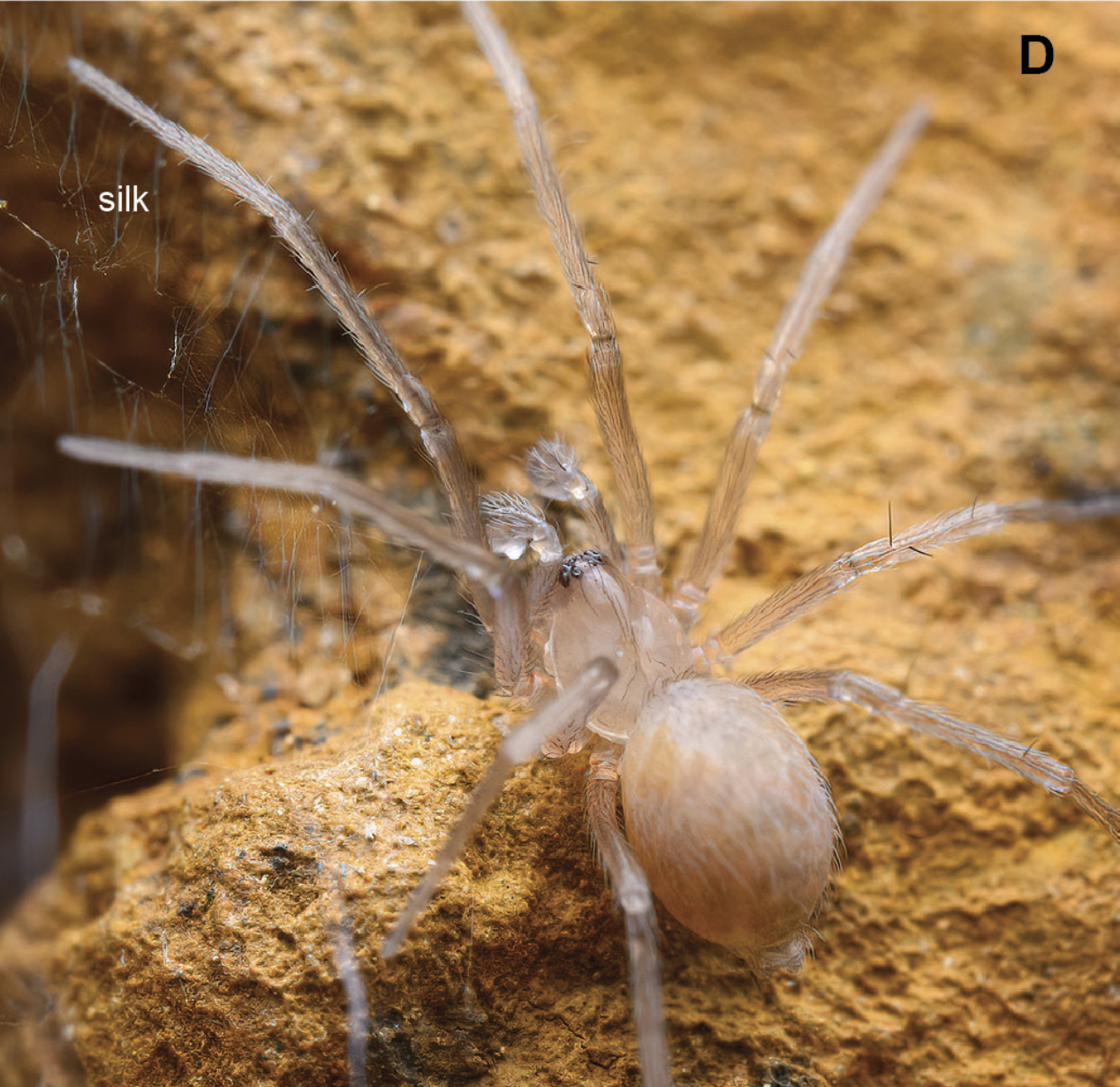
- immature male
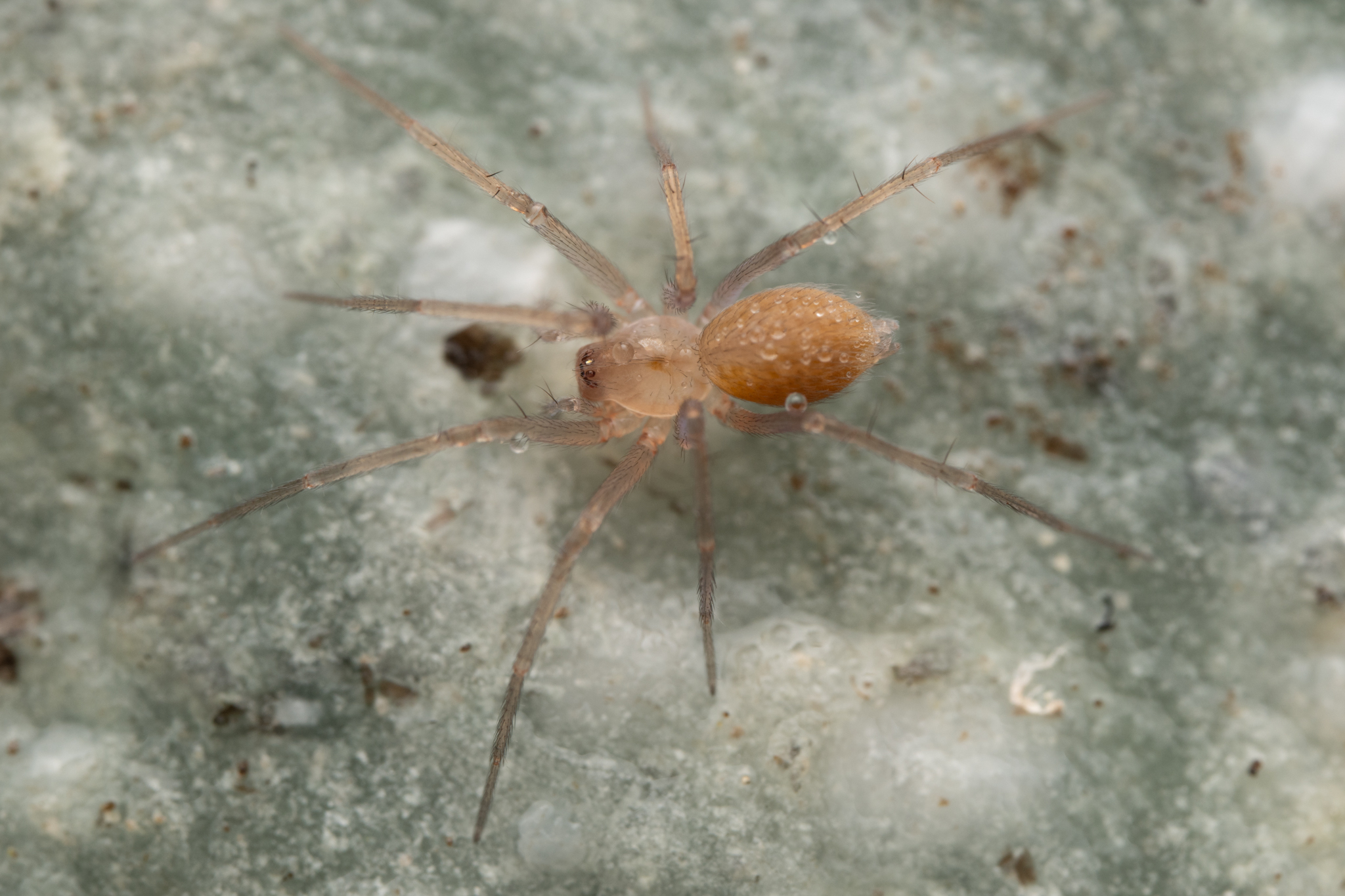

Scientific classification
- Kingdom: Animalia
- Phylum: Arthropoda
- Subphylum: Chelicerata
- Class: Arachnida
- Order: Araneae
- Infraorder: Araneomorphae
- Family: Cybaeidae
- Genus: Siskiyu; Hedin, Ramírez & Monjaraz-Ruedas, 2025
- Species: S. armilla

Binomial name
- Siskiyu armilla Hedin, Ramírez & Monjaraz-Ruedas, 2025

= Siskiyu =

Species of spider

Siskiyu is a monotypic genus of spiders in the family Cybaeidae containing the single species, Siskiyu armilla.

== Distribution ==
Siskiyu armilla has been recorded from northern California and southern Oregon.

== Etymology ==
The genus is named after the Klamath-Siskiyou Mountains that encompass much of the known distribution of this genus. The specific name is from Latin "armilla" (ring, bracelet), referring to the conspicuous ring-like patellar fracture lines.
