= Calymmaria persica =

Scientific classification
- Domain: Eukaryota
- Kingdom: Animalia
- Phylum: Arthropoda
- Subphylum: Chelicerata
- Class: Arachnida
- Order: Araneae
- Infraorder: Araneomorphae
- Family: Cybaeidae
- Genus: Calymmaria
- Species: C. persica

Binomial name
- Calymmaria persica (Hentz, 1847)

Species of spider

Calymmaria persica is a species of true spider in the family Cybaeidae. It is found in the United States.
