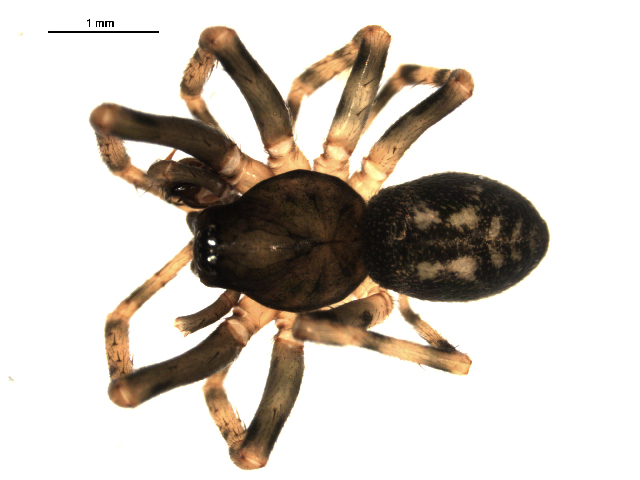
- C. montana, adult male
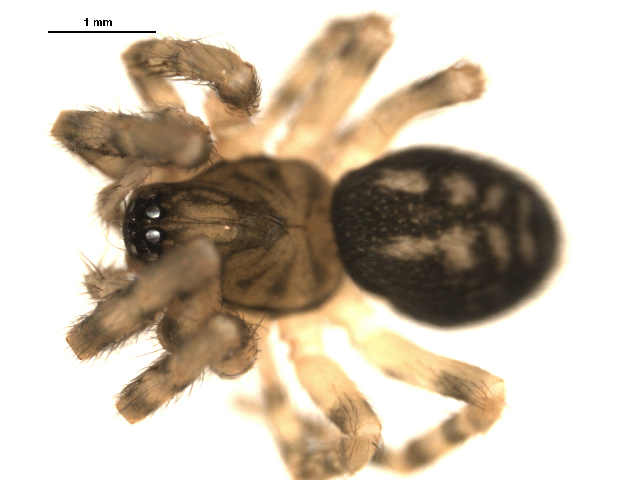
- C. montana, adult female

Conservation status
- Secure (NatureServe)

Scientific classification
- Kingdom: Animalia
- Phylum: Arthropoda
- Subphylum: Chelicerata
- Class: Arachnida
- Order: Araneae
- Infraorder: Araneomorphae
- Family: Cybaeidae
- Genus: Cryphoeca
- Species: C. montana

Binomial name
- Cryphoeca montana Emerton, 1909

= Cryphoeca montana =

Species of spider

Cryphoeca montana is a species of spider in the family Cybaeidae. It is found in the United States and Canada.
