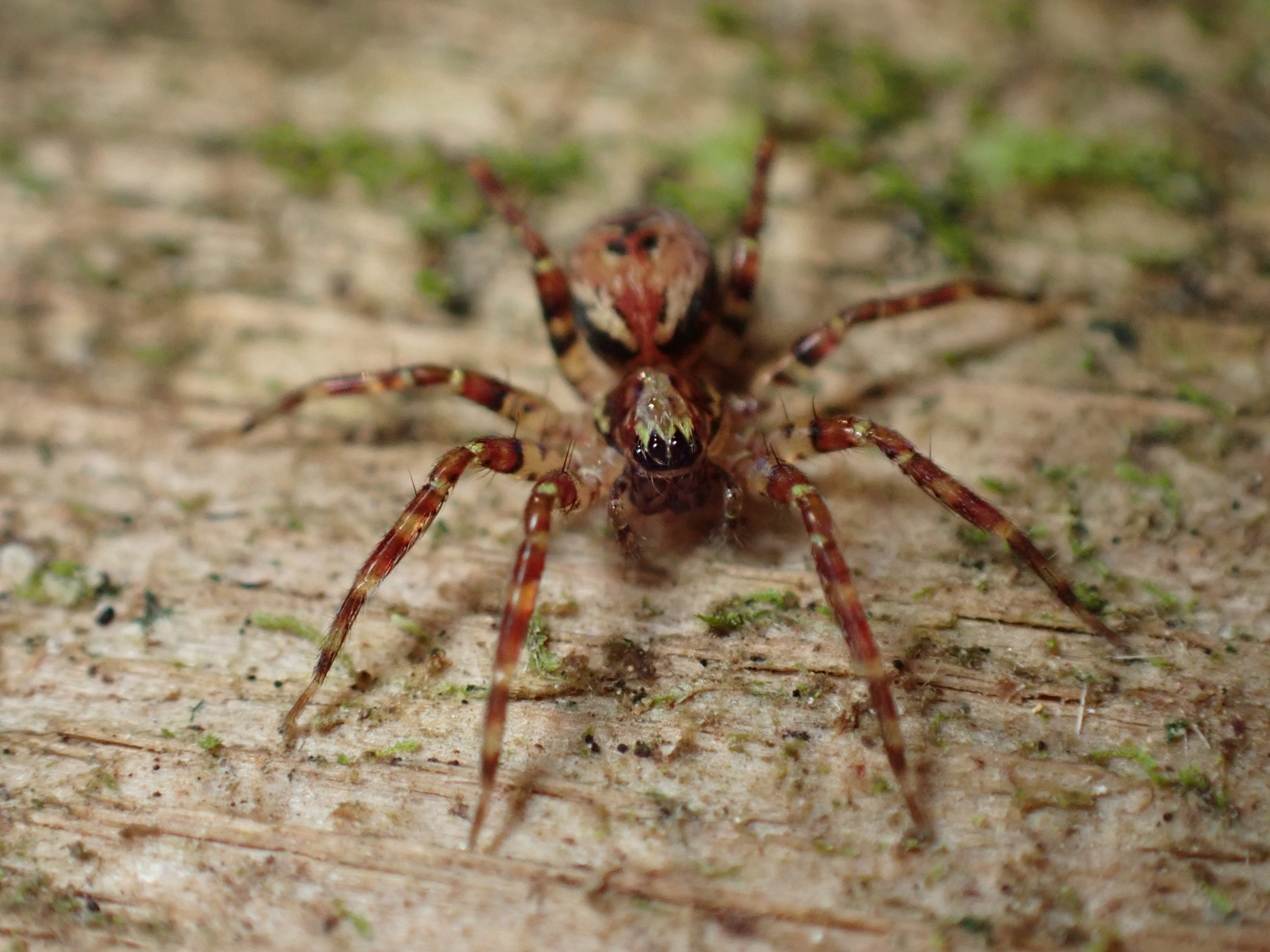
- female C. cintipes

Scientific classification
- Kingdom: Animalia
- Phylum: Arthropoda
- Subphylum: Chelicerata
- Class: Arachnida
- Order: Araneae
- Infraorder: Araneomorphae
- Family: Cybaeidae
- Genus: Dirksia; Chamberlin & Ivie, 1942

Type species
- D. cinctipes (Banks, 1896)

Species
- D. cinctipes (Banks, 1896); D. pyrenaea (Simon, 1898)

= Dirksia =

Genus of spiders

Dirksia is a genus of araneomorph spiders in the family Cybaeidae. It was first described by R. V. Chamberlin & Wilton Ivie in 1942 as a subgenus of Ethobuella. Originally placed with the funnel weavers, it was elevated to genus and moved to the dwarf sheet spiders in 1967, then moved to the Cybaeidae in 2017.

== Species ==
As of October 2025, this genus includes two species:

- Dirksia cinctipes (Banks, 1896) – Alaska, Canada, United States (type species)
- Dirksia pyrenaea (Simon, 1898) – France
