= Cybaeus vignai =

Scientific classification
- Kingdom: Animalia
- Phylum: Arthropoda
- Subphylum: Chelicerata
- Class: Arachnida
- Order: Araneae
- Infraorder: Araneomorphae
- Family: Cybaeidae
- Genus: Cybaeus
- Species: C. vignai

Binomial name
- Cybaeus vignai Brignoli, 1977

Species of spider

Cybaeus vignai is a spider species found in France and Italy.
