= Cybaeus raymondi =

Scientific classification
- Kingdom: Animalia
- Phylum: Arthropoda
- Subphylum: Chelicerata
- Class: Arachnida
- Order: Araneae
- Infraorder: Araneomorphae
- Family: Cybaeidae
- Genus: Cybaeus
- Species: C. raymondi

Binomial name
- Cybaeus raymondi (Simon, 1916)

Species of spider

Cybaeus raymondi is a spider species found in the Pyrenees (Spain and France).
