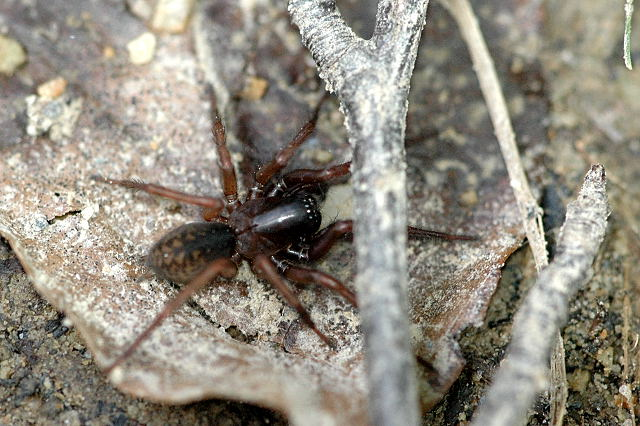

Scientific classification
- Kingdom: Animalia
- Phylum: Arthropoda
- Subphylum: Chelicerata
- Class: Arachnida
- Order: Araneae
- Infraorder: Araneomorphae
- Family: Cybaeidae
- Genus: Cryphoeca
- Species: C. silvicola

Binomial name
- Cryphoeca silvicola (C. L. Koch, 1834)

Synonyms
- Tegenaria silvicola C. L. Koch, 1834; Hahnia silvicola (C. L. Koch, 1845); Amaurobius sylvicolus (C. L. Koch, 1845); Agelena hyndmannii Blackwall, 1861; Apostenus saxatilis Ausserer, 1867

= Cryphoeca silvicola =

Species of spider

Cryphoeca silvicola is a small species of dwarf sheet spider in the family Cybaeidae which has a Palearctic distribution. The generic name, Cryphoeca, means hidden and the specific name silvicola means "living in the woods".

== Description ==
The males are between 2.5 and 3.5 mm in length and the females 2.5-3.9 mm in length. The apophysis on the ventral surface of the tibia is tripartite. The prosoma is yellow-brown, with a black margin and black radial and median stripes, contrastingly patterned. The legs are yellowish, annulated with black. The opisthosoma varies from grey-brown to black, with a bright serrated dorsal median stripe, although on a few rare individuals it is bright with only an ill-defined pattern.

== Distribution ==
Cryphoeca sylvicola has a Palearctic distribution. and is found throughout much of Europe, but is absent from Iceland and is unrecorded in Portugal. In Great Britain it is widespread in western and northern parts of the island Britain, but is largely absent from the south-east.

== Habitat and ecology ==
The species is found in the litter layer of coniferous forests, from lowland regions up to low mountain ranges. In Great Britain Cryphoeca sylvicola also inhabits higher ground where it may be found under stones on the moors. However, it is found in its greatest numbers hiding under the bark on the trunks of trees. When strips of corrugated cardboard were placed around the trunks of trees on Inchcailloch Island in Loch Lomond during the winter months of 1971–72 to sample tree-trunk spiders, Cryphoeca silvicola was the dominant species among those spiders caught. In Finland it was found to form 4.8% of the total biomass of organisms sampled from tree trunks, making it potentially an important prey for breeding common treecreepers Certhia famliaris.

In Britain adult Cryphoeca sylvicola have been recorded as being active in all months of the year with peaks in the spring and early summer and in the autumn.
