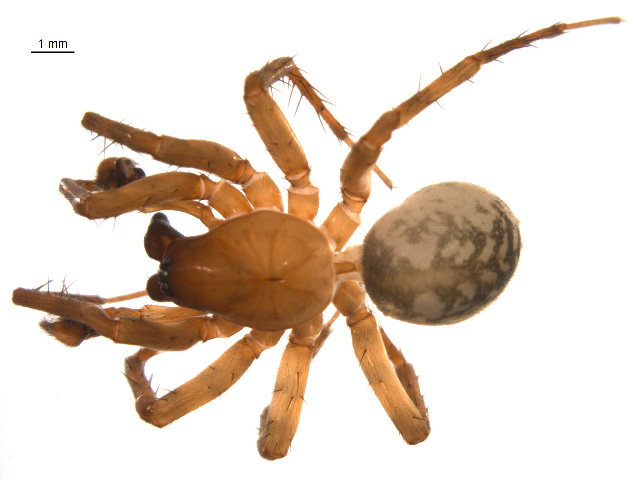
- Cybaeus reticulatus, adult male
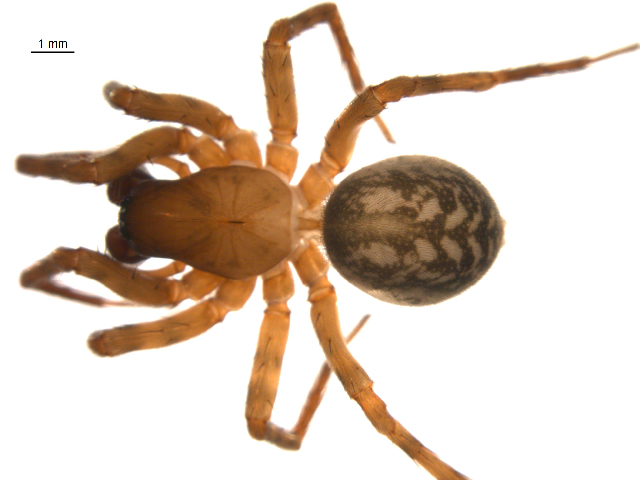
- Cybaeus reticulatus, adult female

Conservation status
- Secure (NatureServe)

Scientific classification
- Kingdom: Animalia
- Phylum: Arthropoda
- Subphylum: Chelicerata
- Class: Arachnida
- Order: Araneae
- Infraorder: Araneomorphae
- Family: Cybaeidae
- Genus: Cybaeus
- Species: C. reticulatus

Binomial name
- Cybaeus reticulatus Simon, 1886

= Cybaeus reticulatus =

Species of spider

Cybaeus reticulatus is a species of spider in the family Cybaeidae. It is found in the United States and Canada. It was first described by Eugène Simon.
