= Cybaeus angustiarum =

Scientific classification
- Kingdom: Animalia
- Phylum: Arthropoda
- Subphylum: Chelicerata
- Class: Arachnida
- Order: Araneae
- Infraorder: Araneomorphae
- Family: Cybaeidae
- Genus: Cybaeus
- Species: C. angustiarum

Binomial name
- Cybaeus angustiarum L. Koch, 1868

Species of spider

Cybaeus angustiarum is a spider species found in Europe to Azerbaijan.
