= Yorima angelica =

Scientific classification
- Domain: Eukaryota
- Kingdom: Animalia
- Phylum: Arthropoda
- Subphylum: Chelicerata
- Class: Arachnida
- Order: Araneae
- Infraorder: Araneomorphae
- Family: Cybaeidae
- Genus: Yorima
- Species: Y. angelica

Binomial name
- Yorima angelica Roth, 1956

Species of spider

Yorima angelica is a species of true spider in the family Cybaeidae. It is found in the United States.
