= Pseudocybaeota =

Scientific classification
- Kingdom: Animalia
- Phylum: Arthropoda
- Subphylum: Chelicerata
- Class: Arachnida
- Order: Araneae
- Infraorder: Araneomorphae
- Family: Cybaeidae
- Genus: Pseudocybaeota; Bennett, 2022

Type species
- Cybaeus perditus Chamberlin & Ivie, 1932

Species
- 3, see text

Genus of spiders

Pseudocybaeota is a genus of spiders in the family Cybaeidae.

== Distribution ==
Pseudocybaeota is endemic to the coastal Pacific Northwestern US

P. butterfieldi is known from a single male from California; P. perdita is endemic to wet forests in Washington State. P. tuberculata was collected in the border area of California and Oregon.

== Etymology ==
The genus name means "false Cybaeota", referring to Bennett's initial belief that P. perdita should be placed in that genus.

P. butterfieldi honors Californian Blues musician Paul Butterfield. P. tuberculata "refers to the roughened, tuberculate surface of the proximal arm of the tegular apophysis of the male genital bulb".

== Species ==
As of October 2025, this genus includes three species:

- Pseudocybaeota butterfieldi Bennett, 2022 – United States
- Pseudocybaeota perdita (Chamberlin & Ivie, 1932) – United States (type species)
- Pseudocybaeota tuberculata Bennett, 2022 – United States
