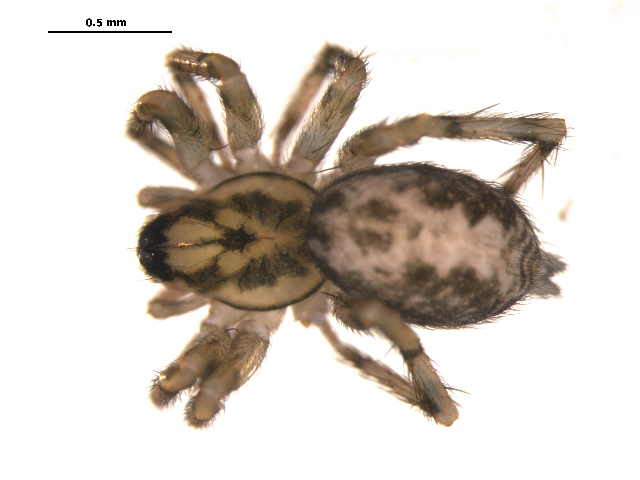
- E. tuonops, adult female from Alaska

Scientific classification
- Kingdom: Animalia
- Phylum: Arthropoda
- Subphylum: Chelicerata
- Class: Arachnida
- Order: Araneae
- Infraorder: Araneomorphae
- Family: Cybaeidae
- Genus: Ethobuella
- Species: E. tuonops

Binomial name
- Ethobuella tuonops Chamberlin & Ivie, 1937

= Ethobuella tuonops =

Species of spider

Ethobuella tuonops is a species of true spider in the family Cybaeidae. It is found in the United States and Canada.
