= Cryphoeca nivalis =

Scientific classification
- Kingdom: Animalia
- Phylum: Arthropoda
- Subphylum: Chelicerata
- Class: Arachnida
- Order: Araneae
- Infraorder: Araneomorphae
- Family: Cybaeidae
- Genus: Cryphoeca
- Species: C. nivalis

Binomial name
- Cryphoeca nivalis Schenkel, 1919

Synonyms

Species of spider

Cryphoeca silvicola is a species of dwarf sheet spider in the family Cybaeidae, found in Switzerland, Austria, and Italy.
