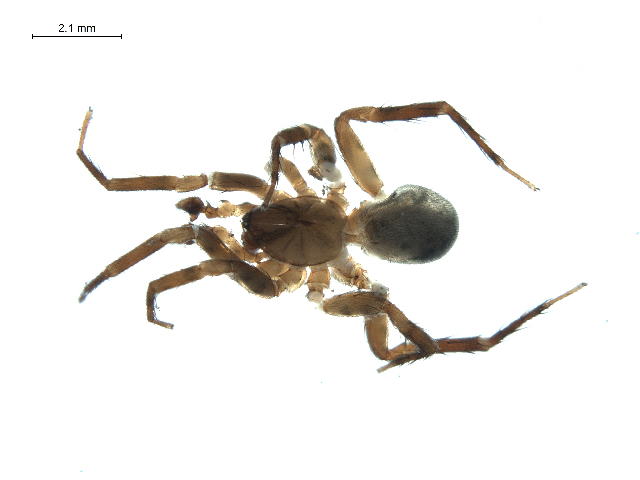
- B. californicum, adult male
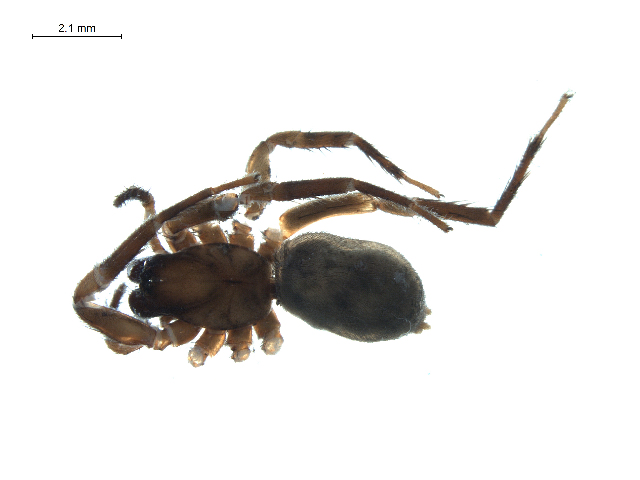
- B. californicum, adult female

Scientific classification
- Kingdom: Animalia
- Phylum: Arthropoda
- Subphylum: Chelicerata
- Class: Arachnida
- Order: Araneae
- Infraorder: Araneomorphae
- Family: Cybaeidae
- Genus: Blabomma
- Species: B. californicum

Binomial name
- Blabomma californicum (Simon, 1895)

= Blabomma californicum =

Species of spider

Blabomma californicum is a species of true spider in the family Dictynidae. It is found in western Canada, Mexico, and the United States. The species is listed as imperiled in Canada. Although most spiders have eight eyes, B. californicum has only six.
