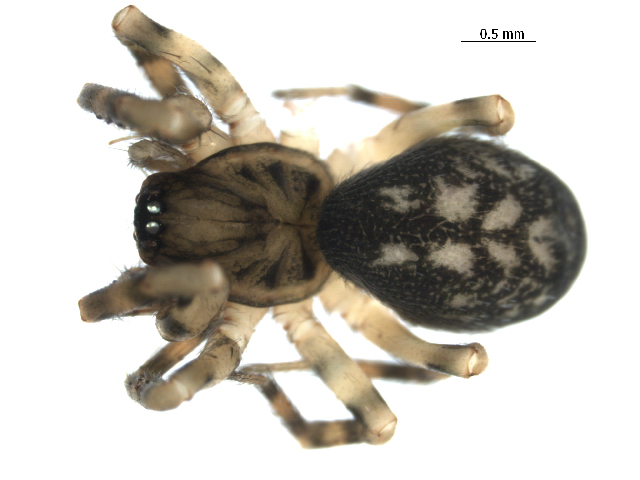

Conservation status
- Secure (NatureServe)

Scientific classification
- Kingdom: Animalia
- Phylum: Arthropoda
- Subphylum: Chelicerata
- Class: Arachnida
- Order: Araneae
- Infraorder: Araneomorphae
- Family: Cybaeidae
- Genus: Cryphoeca
- Species: C. exlineae

Binomial name
- Cryphoeca exlineae Roth, 1988

= Cryphoeca exlineae =

Species of spider

Cryphoeca exlineae is a species of spider in the family Cybaeidae. It is found in Canada and the United States.
