= Neocryphoeca =

Scientific classification
- Kingdom: Animalia
- Phylum: Arthropoda
- Subphylum: Chelicerata
- Class: Arachnida
- Order: Araneae
- Infraorder: Araneomorphae
- Family: Cybaeidae
- Genus: Neocryphoeca; Roth, 1970

Type species
- N. gertschi Roth, 1970

Species
- N. beattyi Roth, 1970 – USA; N. gertschi Roth, 1970 – USA

Genus of spiders

Neocryphoeca is a genus of North American araneomorph spiders in the family Cybaeidae, and was first described by V. D. Roth in 1970. As of May 2019 it contains only two species, both found in the United States: N. beattyi and N. gertschi. Originally placed with the funnel weavers, it was moved to the Cybaeidae in 1983.
