= Vagellia =

Scientific classification
- Kingdom: Animalia
- Phylum: Arthropoda
- Subphylum: Chelicerata
- Class: Arachnida
- Order: Araneae
- Infraorder: Araneomorphae
- Family: Cybaeidae
- Genus: Vagellia; Simon, 1899
- Species: V. helveola

Binomial name
- Vagellia helveola Simon, 1899

Genus of spiders

Vagellia is a monotypic genus of Southeast Asian araneomorph spiders in the family Cybaeidae containing the single species, Vagellia helveola. It was first described by Eugène Simon in 1899, and has only been found in Indonesia.
