= Allocybaeina =

Scientific classification
- Kingdom: Animalia
- Phylum: Arthropoda
- Subphylum: Chelicerata
- Class: Arachnida
- Order: Araneae
- Infraorder: Araneomorphae
- Family: Cybaeidae
- Genus: Allocybaeina; Bennett, 2020
- Species: A. littlewalteri

Binomial name
- Allocybaeina littlewalteri Bennett, 2020

Genus of spiders

Allocybaeina is a monotypic genus of North American spiders in the family Cybaeidae containing the single species, Allocybaeina littlewalteri. It was first described by R. Bennett, C. Copley and D. Copley in 2020, and it has only been found in the United States.
