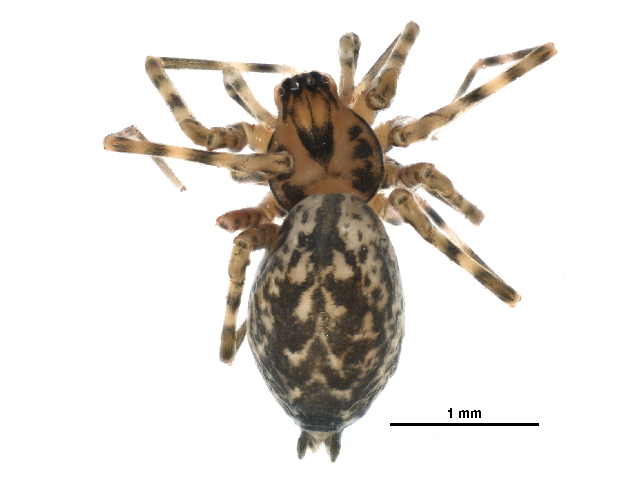
- C. emertoni
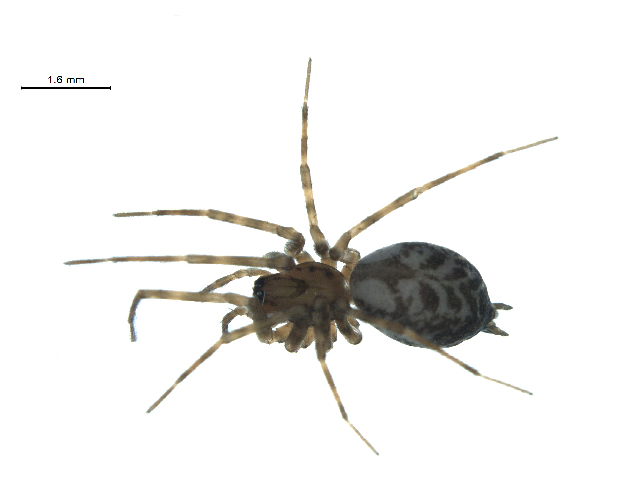
- C. nana

Scientific classification
- Kingdom: Animalia
- Phylum: Arthropoda
- Subphylum: Chelicerata
- Class: Arachnida
- Order: Araneae
- Infraorder: Araneomorphae
- Family: Cybaeidae
- Genus: Calymmaria; Chamberlin & Ivie, 1937

Type species
- C. monicae Chamberlin & Ivie, 1937

Species
- 31, see text

= Calymmaria =

Genus of spiders

Calymmaria is a genus of North American araneomorph spiders in the family Cybaeidae, and was first described by R. V. Chamberlin & Wilton Ivie in 1937. They have body lengths ranging from 2 to 10 millimetres (0.079 to 0.394 in).

== Species ==
As of May 2019 it contains thirty-one species:

- Calymmaria alleni Heiss & Draney, 2004 – USA
- Calymmaria aspenola Chamberlin & Ivie, 1942 – USA
- Calymmaria bifurcata Heiss & Draney, 2004 – USA
- Calymmaria californica (Banks, 1896) – USA
- Calymmaria carmel Heiss & Draney, 2004 – USA
- Calymmaria emertoni (Simon, 1897) – USA, Canada
- Calymmaria farallon Heiss & Draney, 2004 – USA
- Calymmaria gertschi Heiss & Draney, 2004 – USA
- Calymmaria humboldi Heiss & Draney, 2004 – USA
- Calymmaria iviei Heiss & Draney, 2004 – USA
- Calymmaria lora Chamberlin & Ivie, 1942 – USA
- Calymmaria minuta Heiss & Draney, 2004 – USA
- Calymmaria monicae Chamberlin & Ivie, 1937 (type) – USA
- Calymmaria monterey Heiss & Draney, 2004 – USA
- Calymmaria nana (Simon, 1897) – USA, Canada
- Calymmaria orick Heiss & Draney, 2004 – USA
- Calymmaria persica (Hentz, 1847) – USA
- Calymmaria rosario Heiss & Draney, 2004 – Mexico
- Calymmaria rothi Heiss & Draney, 2004 – USA
- Calymmaria scotia Heiss & Draney, 2004 – USA
- Calymmaria sequoia Heiss & Draney, 2004 – USA
- Calymmaria shastae Chamberlin & Ivie, 1937 – USA
- Calymmaria sierra Heiss & Draney, 2004 – USA
- Calymmaria similaria Heiss & Draney, 2004 – USA
- Calymmaria siskiyou Heiss & Draney, 2004 – USA
- Calymmaria sueni Heiss & Draney, 2004 – USA
- Calymmaria suprema Chamberlin & Ivie, 1937 – USA, Canada
- Calymmaria tecate Heiss & Draney, 2004 – Mexico
- Calymmaria tubera Heiss & Draney, 2004 – USA
- Calymmaria virginica Heiss & Draney, 2004 – USA
- Calymmaria yolandae Heiss & Draney, 2004 – USA
