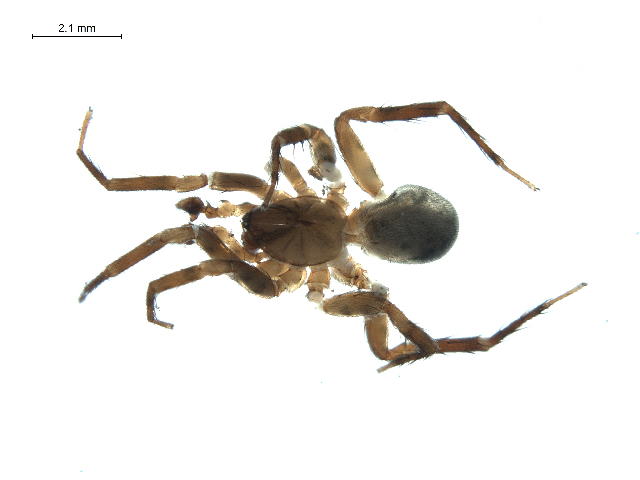
- B. californicum, male

Scientific classification
- Kingdom: Animalia
- Phylum: Arthropoda
- Subphylum: Chelicerata
- Class: Arachnida
- Order: Araneae
- Infraorder: Araneomorphae
- Family: Cybaeidae
- Genus: Blabomma; Chamberlin & Ivie, 1937

Type species
- B. californicum (Simon, 1895)

Species
- 11, see text

Synonyms
- Chorizommoides Chamberlin & Ivie, 1937

= Blabomma =

Genus of spiders

Blabomma is a genus of araneomorph spiders in the family Cybaeidae, and was first described by R. V. Chamberlin & Wilton Ivie in 1937. Originally placed with the funnel weavers, it was moved to the Dictynidae in 1967, and to the Cybaeidae in 2017.

== Species ==
As of May 2019, it contains eleven species:

- Blabomma californicum (Simon, 1895) (type) – USA
- Blabomma flavipes Chamberlin & Ivie, 1937 – USA
- Blabomma foxi Chamberlin & Ivie, 1937 – USA
- Blabomma guttatum Chamberlin & Ivie, 1937 – USA
- Blabomma hexops Chamberlin & Ivie, 1937 – USA
- Blabomma lahondae (Chamberlin & Ivie, 1937) – USA
- Blabomma oregonense Chamberlin & Ivie, 1937 – USA
- Blabomma sanctum Chamberlin & Ivie, 1937 – USA
- Blabomma sylvicola (Chamberlin & Ivie, 1937) – USA
- Blabomma uenoi Paik & Yaginuma, 1969 – Korea
- Blabomma yosemitense Chamberlin & Ivie, 1937 – USA
