= Mastigusa =

Scientific classification
- Kingdom: Animalia
- Phylum: Arthropoda
- Subphylum: Chelicerata
- Class: Arachnida
- Order: Araneae
- Infraorder: Araneomorphae
- Family: Hahniidae
- Genus: Mastigusa; Menge, 1854

Species
- 4, see text

Genus of spiders

Mastigusa is a genus of dwarf sheet spiders that was first described by Anton Menge in 1854.

== Species ==
As of January 2026, this genus includes four species:

- Mastigusa arietina (Thorell, 1871) – Europe, Turkey, Russia (Europe, Caucasus, South Siberia), Georgia, Iran
- Mastigusa diversa (O. Pickard-Cambridge, 1893) – Britain, Portugal, Spain, Algeria
- Mastigusa lucifuga (Simon, 1898) – France (Pyrenees)
- Mastigusa macrophthalma (Kulczyński, 1897) – Slovenia, Croatia, Bosnia and Herzegovina, Bulgaria
