= Symposia =

Scientific classification
- Kingdom: Animalia
- Phylum: Arthropoda
- Subphylum: Chelicerata
- Class: Arachnida
- Order: Araneae
- Infraorder: Araneomorphae
- Family: Cybaeidae
- Genus: Symposia; Simon, 1898

Type species
- S. silvicola Simon, 1898

Species
- 6, see text

Genus of spiders

Symposia is a genus of South American araneomorph spiders in the family Cybaeidae, and was first described by Eugène Simon in 1898.

== Species ==
As of May 2019 it contains six species in Venezuela and Colombia:

- Symposia bifurca Roth, 1967 – Venezuela
- Symposia columbiana Müller & Heimer, 1988 – Colombia
- Symposia dubiosa Roth, 1967 – Venezuela
- Symposia sexoculata Roth, 1967 – Venezuela
- Symposia silvicola Simon, 1898 (type) – Venezuela
- Symposia umbrosa Simon, 1898 – Venezuela
