= Tuberta =

Scientific classification
- Domain: Eukaryota
- Kingdom: Animalia
- Phylum: Arthropoda
- Subphylum: Chelicerata
- Class: Arachnida
- Order: Araneae
- Infraorder: Araneomorphae
- Family: Cybaeidae
- Genus: Tuberta; Simon, 1884

Type species
- T. maerens (O. Pickard-Cambridge, 1863)

Species
- T. maerens (O. Pickard-Cambridge, 1863) – Europe to Azerbaijan; T. mirabilis (Thorell, 1871) – Italy

Genus of spiders

Tuberta is a genus of araneomorph spiders in the family Cybaeidae, and was first described by Eugène Simon in 1884. As of May 2019 it contains only two species: T. maerens and T. mirabilis. Originally placed with the funnel weavers, it was moved to the Hahniidae in 1967, then to the Cybaeidae in 2017.
