= Willisus =

Scientific classification
- Domain: Eukaryota
- Kingdom: Animalia
- Phylum: Arthropoda
- Subphylum: Chelicerata
- Class: Arachnida
- Order: Araneae
- Infraorder: Araneomorphae
- Family: Cybaeidae
- Genus: Willisus; Roth, 1981
- Species: W. gertschi

Binomial name
- Willisus gertschi Roth, 1981

Genus of spiders

Willisus is a monotypic genus of North American araneomorph spiders in the family Cybaeidae containing the single species, Willisus gertschi. It was first described by V. D. Roth in 1981, and has only been found in United States.
