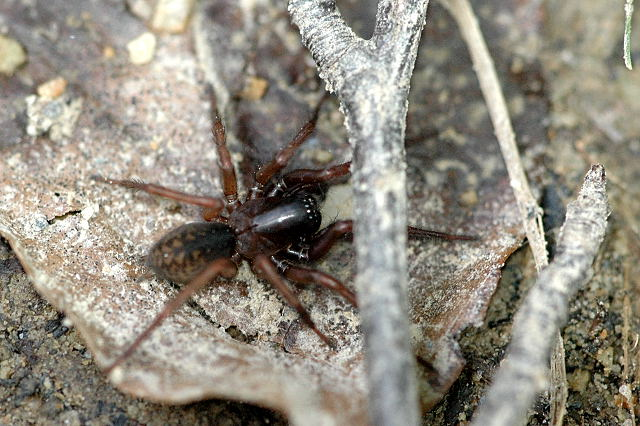
- Cryphoeca silvicola

Scientific classification
- Domain: Eukaryota
- Kingdom: Animalia
- Phylum: Arthropoda
- Subphylum: Chelicerata
- Class: Arachnida
- Order: Araneae
- Infraorder: Araneomorphae
- Family: Cybaeidae
- Genus: Cryphoeca; Thorell, 1870

Type species
- C. silvicola (C. L. Koch, 1834)

Species
- 12, see text

= Cryphoeca =

Genus of spiders

Cryphoeca is a genus of araneomorph spiders in the family Cybaeidae, and was first described by Tamerlan Thorell in 1870. The name means hidden, in reference to its preference for hiding under loose bark or in stone walls.

== Species ==
As of May 2019 it contains twelve species and one subspecies:

- Cryphoeca angularis Saito, 1934 – Japan
- Cryphoeca brignolii Thaler, 1980 – Switzerland, Italy
- Cryphoeca carpathica Herman, 1879 – Eastern Europe
- Cryphoeca exlineae Roth, 1988 – USA
- Cryphoeca lichenum L. Koch, 1876 – Germany, Austria
  - Cryphoeca l. nigerrima Thaler, 1978 – Germany, Austria
- Cryphoeca montana Emerton, 1909 – USA, Canada
- Cryphoeca nivalis Schenkel, 1919 – Switzerland, Austria, Italy
- Cryphoeca pirini (Drensky, 1921) – Bulgaria, Turkey
- Cryphoeca shingoi Ono, 2007 – Japan
- Cryphoeca shinkaii Ono, 2007 – Japan
- Cryphoeca silvicola (C. L. Koch, 1834) (type) – Europe, Turkey, Russia (Europe to Far East), Japan
- Cryphoeca thaleri Wunderlich, 1995 – Turkey
