= Cryphoecina =

Scientific classification
- Kingdom: Animalia
- Phylum: Arthropoda
- Subphylum: Chelicerata
- Class: Arachnida
- Order: Araneae
- Infraorder: Araneomorphae
- Family: Cybaeidae
- Genus: Cryphoecina; Deltshev, 1997
- Species: C. deelemanae

Binomial name
- Cryphoecina deelemanae Deltshev, 1997

Genus of spiders

Cryphoecina is a monotypic genus of Balkan araneomorph spiders in the family Cybaeidae containing the single species, Cryphoecina deelemanae. It was first described by C. Deltshev in 1997, and has only been found in Montenegro.
