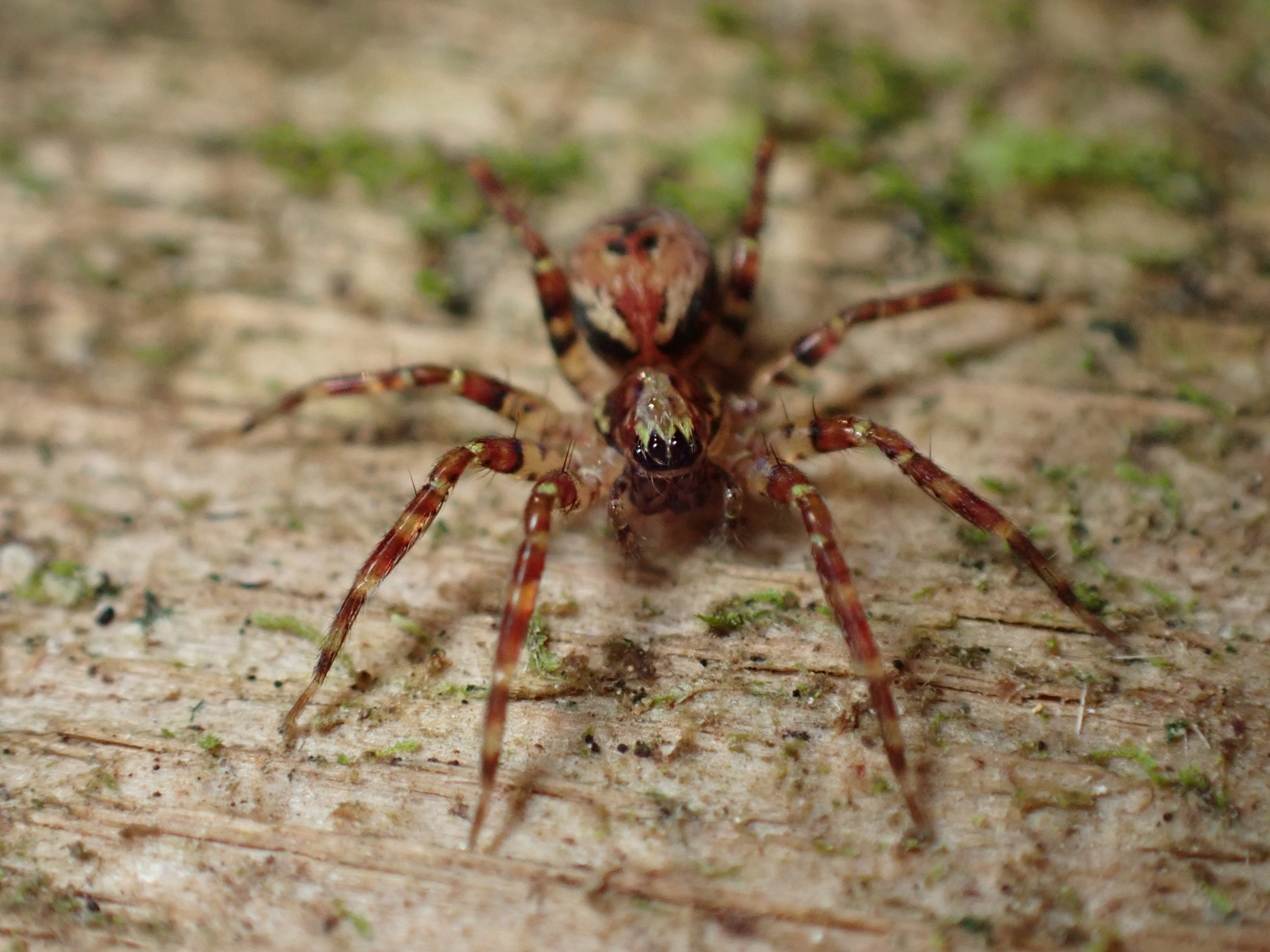
- female

Scientific classification
- Kingdom: Animalia
- Phylum: Arthropoda
- Subphylum: Chelicerata
- Class: Arachnida
- Order: Araneae
- Infraorder: Araneomorphae
- Family: Cybaeidae
- Genus: Dirksia
- Species: D. cinctipes

Binomial name
- Dirksia cinctipes (Banks, 1896)

Synonyms
- Apostenus cinctipes Banks, 1896; Ethobuella anyphaenoides Chamberlin & Ivie, 1942; Ethobuella cinctipes Chamberlin & Ivie, 1947

= Dirksia cinctipes =

Species of spider

Dirksia cinctipes is a species of spider in the family Cybaeidae.

It is known from Alaska, Canada, and the USA.
