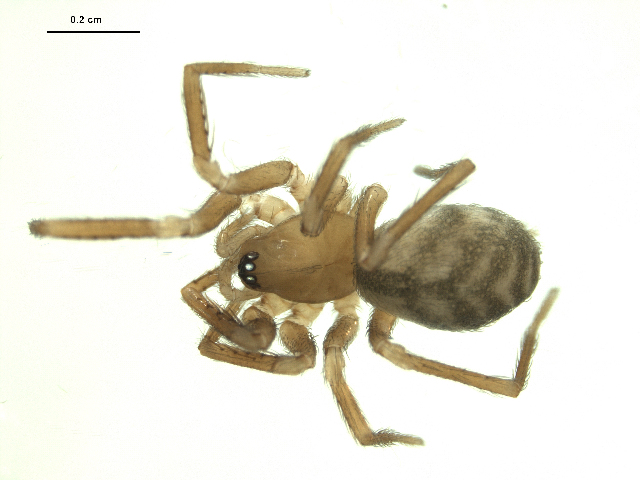
- C. calcarata

Scientific classification
- Kingdom: Animalia
- Phylum: Arthropoda
- Subphylum: Chelicerata
- Class: Arachnida
- Order: Araneae
- Infraorder: Araneomorphae
- Family: Cybaeidae
- Genus: Cybaeota; Chamberlin & Ivie, 1933

Type species
- C. calcarata (Emerton, 1911)

Species
- 4, see text

= Cybaeota =

Genus of spiders

Cybaeota is a genus of North American araneomorph spiders in the family Cybaeidae, and was first described by R. V. Chamberlin & Wilton Ivie in 1933. It was moved to the Cybaeidae in 1967.

== Species ==
As of May 2019 it contains four species in the United States and Canada:

- Cybaeota calcarata (Emerton, 1911) (type) – USA, Canada
- Cybaeota munda Chamberlin & Ivie, 1937 – USA
- Cybaeota nana Chamberlin & Ivie, 1937 – USA, Canada
- Cybaeota shastae Chamberlin & Ivie, 1937 – USA
