= Yorima =

Scientific classification
- Kingdom: Animalia
- Phylum: Arthropoda
- Subphylum: Chelicerata
- Class: Arachnida
- Order: Araneae
- Infraorder: Araneomorphae
- Family: Cybaeidae
- Genus: Yorima; Chamberlin & Ivie, 1942

Type species
- Y. sequoiae (Chamberlin & Ivie, 1937)

Species
- 6, see text

Genus of spiders

Yorima is a genus of araneomorph spiders in the family Cybaeidae and was first described by R. V. Chamberlin & Wilton Ivie in 1942. Originally placed in the funnel weaver family, it was moved to the Dictynidae in 1967, and to the Cybaeidae in 2017.

== Species ==
As of May 2019, it contains six species in the United States and Cuba:

- Yorima albida Roth, 1956 – USA
- Yorima angelica Roth, 1956 – USA
- Yorima antillana (Bryant, 1940) – Cuba
- Yorima flava (Chamberlin & Ivie, 1937) – USA
- Yorima sequoiae (Chamberlin & Ivie, 1937) (type) – USA
- Yorima subflava Chamberlin & Ivie, 1942 – USA
