= Ethobuella =

Scientific classification
- Kingdom: Animalia
- Phylum: Arthropoda
- Subphylum: Chelicerata
- Class: Arachnida
- Order: Araneae
- Infraorder: Araneomorphae
- Family: Cybaeidae
- Genus: Ethobuella; Chamberlin & Ivie, 1937

Type species
- E. tuonops Chamberlin & Ivie, 1937

Species
- E. hespera Chamberlin & Ivie, 1937 – USA; E. tuonops Chamberlin & Ivie, 1937 – USA, Canada

Genus of spiders

Ethobuella is a genus of North American araneomorph spiders in the family Cybaeidae, and was first described by R. V. Chamberlin & Wilton Ivie in 1937. As of May 2019 it contains only two species: E. hespera and E. tuonops. Originally placed with the funnel weavers, it was elevated to genus and moved to the dwarf sheet spiders in 1967, then moved to the Cybaeidae in 2017.
