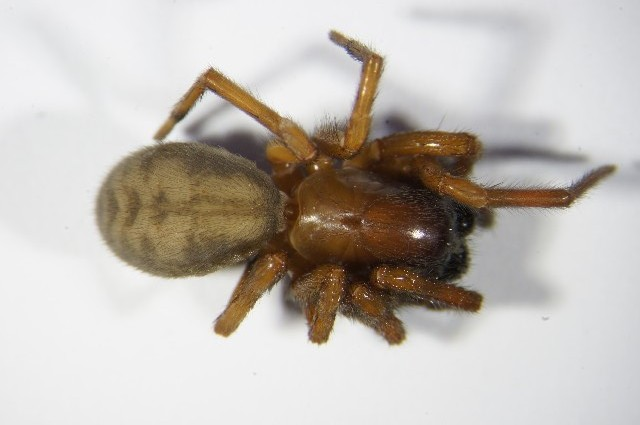

Scientific classification
- Domain: Eukaryota
- Kingdom: Animalia
- Phylum: Arthropoda
- Subphylum: Chelicerata
- Class: Arachnida
- Order: Araneae
- Infraorder: Araneomorphae
- Family: Amaurobiidae
- Genus: Callobius
- Species: C. claustrarius

Binomial name
- Callobius claustrarius (Hahn, 1833)

Synonyms
- Clubiona claustrarius Amaurobius claustrarius Cybaeus tetricus Ciniflo claustrarius

= Callobius claustrarius =

Species of spider

Callobius claustrarius is a species of spider in the family Amaurobiidae. Males of the species reach 8 mm, females about 11 mm. Head and legs are reddish brown, the abdomen is dark grey with an extended brown surface, dotted with lighter brown specks.

Adults can be found from autumn to spring.

This is a palearctic species. In Europe, it is found in mountainous regions, especially in old, moist forests under rocks. C. claustrarius is a rather rare species.

The subspecies C. claustrarius balcanicus (Drensky, 1940) is only found in Bulgaria.
