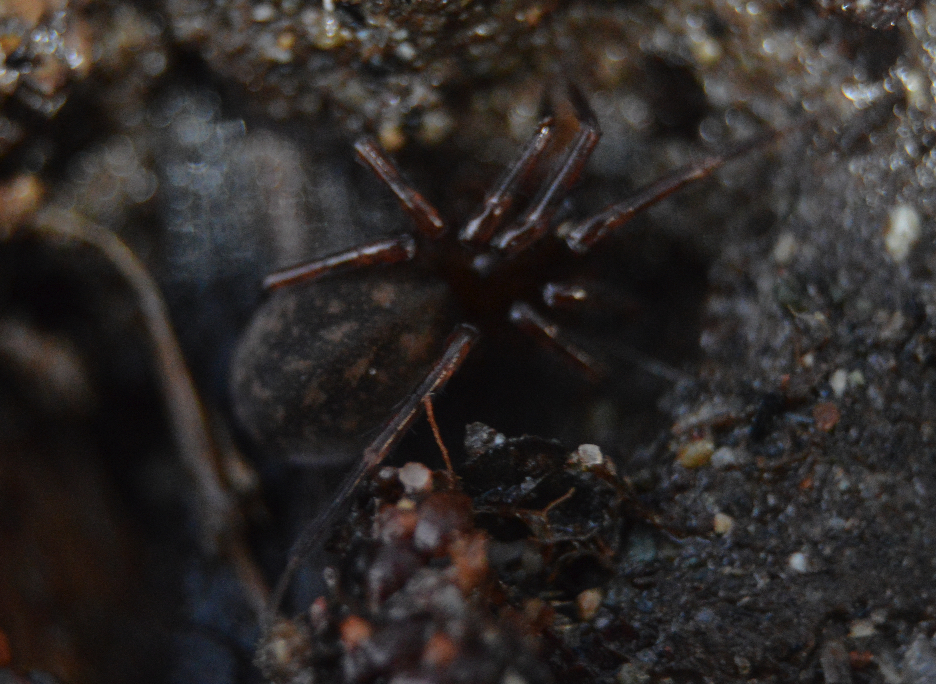
- Cybaeus sp. in Washington
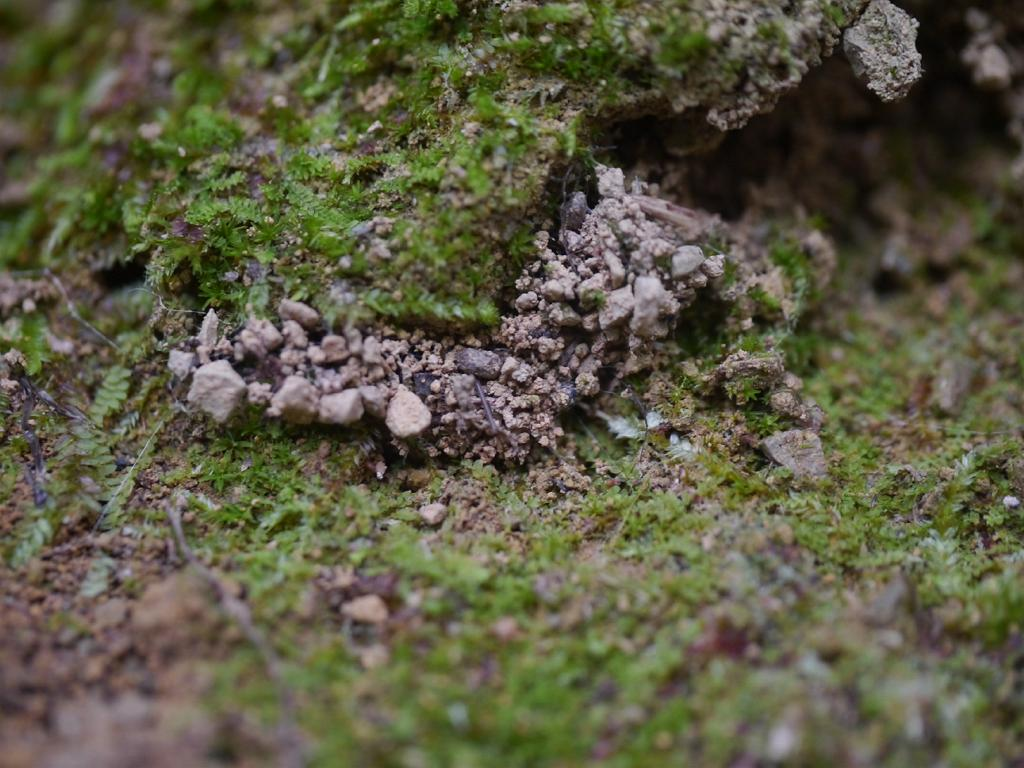
- Cybaeus sp. nest

Scientific classification
- Domain: Eukaryota
- Kingdom: Animalia
- Phylum: Arthropoda
- Subphylum: Chelicerata
- Class: Arachnida
- Order: Araneae
- Infraorder: Araneomorphae
- Family: Cybaeidae
- Genus: Cybaeus; L. Koch, 1868

Type species
- C. tetricus (C. L. Koch, 1839)

Species
- 198, see text

Synonyms
- Bansaia Uyemura, 1938; Dolichocybaeus Kishida, 1968; Heterocybaeus Komatsu, 1968; Namopsilus Chamberlin, 1919; Parauximus Chamberlin, 1919

= Cybaeus =

Genus of spiders

Cybaeus is a genus of araneomorph spiders in the family Cybaeidae, first described by Ludwig Carl Christian Koch in 1868. It is found in America, Europe, Japan, Korea and China. Females of different species are difficult to distinguish, especially in North America. Images of males that include pedipalps are the easiest to determine species.

== Species ==
As of September 2022 it contains 198 species:

- Cybaeus abchasicus Charitonov, 1947 — Turkey, Caucasus (Russia, Georgia)
- Cybaeus adenes Chamberlin & Ivie, 1932 — USA
- Cybaeus aikana Ihara, Koike & Nakano, 2021 — Japan (Ryukyu Is.)
- Cybaeus aizuensis Kobayashi, 2006 — Japan
- Cybaeus akaanaensis Ihara, 1968) — Japan
- Cybaeus akiensis Ihara, 2003 — Japan
- Cybaeus amamiensis Ihara, Koike & Nakano, 2021 — Japan (Ryukyu Is.)
- Cybaeus amicus Chamberlin & Ivie, 1932 — USA
- Cybaeus anaiwaensis Ihara, 1968) — Japan
- Cybaeus angustiarum L. Koch, 1868 — Europe
- Cybaeus aokii Yaginuma, 1972 — Japan
- Cybaeus aquilonalis Yaginuma, 1958 — China, Japan
- Cybaeus aratrum Kim & Kim, 2008 — Korea
- Cybaeus asahi Kobayashi, 2006 — Japan
- Cybaeus ashikitaensis Ihara, 1968) — Japan
- Cybaeus aspenicolens Chamberlin & Ivie, 1932 — USA
- Cybaeus auburn Bennett, 2019 — USA
- Cybaeus auriculatus Seo, 2017 — Korea
- Cybaeus balkanus Deltshev, 1997 — Bulgaria, Serbia, North Macedonia
- Cybaeus bam Marusik & Logunov, 1991 — Russia (Kurile Is.)
- Cybaeus basarukini Marusik & Logunov, 1991 — Russia (Sakhalin)
- Cybaeus bilectus Bennett, 2021 — USA
- Cybaeus bitchuensis Ihara & Nojima, 2005 — Japan
- Cybaeus biwaensis Kobayashi, 2006 — Japan
- Cybaeus blasbes Chamberlin & Ivie, 1932 — USA
- Cybaeus brignolii Maurer, 1992 — Turkey
- Cybaeus broni Caporiacco, 1934 — Karakorum
- Cybaeus bryoncavus Bennett, 2021 — USA
- Cybaeus bulbosus Exline, 1935 — USA
- Cybaeus cascadius Roth, 1952 — USA
- Cybaeus charlesi Bennett, 2016 — USA, Canada
- Cybaeus chauliodous Bennett, 2009 — USA
- Cybaeus communis Yaginuma, 1972 — Japan
- Cybaeus confrantis Oliger, 1994 — Russia (Far East)
- Cybaeus conservans Chamberlin & Ivie, 1932 — USA
- Cybaeus consocius Chamberlin & Ivie, 1932 — USA
- Cybaeus constrictus Chamberlin & Ivie, 1942 — USA
- Cybaeus coylei Bennett, 2021 — USA
- Cybaeus cribelloides Chamberlin & Ivie, 1932 — USA
- Cybaeus culter Lee, Yoo & Kim, 2021 — Korea
- Cybaeus cylisteus Zhu & Wang, 1992 — China
- Cybaeus daimonji Matsuda, Ihara & Nakano, 2020 — Japan
- Cybaeus daisen Ihara & Nojima, 2005 — Japan
- Cybaeus deletroneus Zhu & Wang, 1992 — China
- Cybaeus desmaeus Zhu & Wang, 1992 — China
- Cybaeus devius Chamberlin & Ivie, 1942 — USA
- Cybaeus echigo Kobayashi, 2006 — Japan
- Cybaeus echinaceus Zhu & Wang, 1992 — China
- Cybaeus echo Bennett, 2021 — USA
- Cybaeus enshu Kobayashi, 2006 — Japan
- Cybaeus eutypus Chamberlin & Ivie, 1932 — USA, Canada
- Cybaeus fraxineus Bennett, 2021 — USA
- Cybaeus fujisanus Yaginuma, 1972 — Japan
- Cybaeus fushun Lin & Li, 2021 — China, Russia (Far East)
- Cybaeus fuujinensis Ihara, 1968) — Japan
- Cybaeus gassan Kobayashi, 2006 — Japan
- Cybaeus geumensis Seo, 2016 — Korea
- Cybaeus gidneyi Bennett, 2009 — USA
- Cybaeus giganteus Banks, 1892 — USA
- Cybaeus gonokawa Ihara, 1993 — Japan
- Cybaeus gotoensis (Yamaguchi & Yaginuma, 1971) — Japan
- Cybaeus grizzlyi Schenkel, 1950 — USA
- Cybaeus harrietae Bennett, 2016 — USA
- Cybaeus hatsushibai Ihara, 2005 — Japan
- Cybaeus hesper Chamberlin & Ivie, 1932 — USA
- Cybaeus hibaensis Ihara, 1994 — Japan
- Cybaeus higoensis Irie & Ono, 2000 — Japan
- Cybaeus hikidai Ihara, Koike & Nakano, 2021 — Japan (Ryukyu Is.)
- Cybaeus hiroshimaensis Ihara, 1993 — Japan
- Cybaeus huadian Lin & Li, 2021 — China, Russia (Far East)
- Cybaeus hummeli Bennett, 2021 — USA
- Cybaeus iharai Sugawara, Koike & Nakano, 2022 — Japan
- Cybaeus ilweolensis Seo, 2016 — Korea
- Cybaeus inagakii Ono, 2008 — Japan
- Cybaeus intermedius Maurer, 1992 — France, Switzerland, Italy
- Cybaeus irreverens Bennett, 2022 — USA
- Cybaeus ishikawai (Kishida, 1940) — Japan
- Cybaeus itsukiensis Irie, 1998 — Japan
- Cybaeus jaanaensis Komatsu, 1968 — Japan
- Cybaeus jilinensis Song, Kim & Zhu, 1993 — China
- Cybaeus jinsekiensis Ihara, 2006 — Japan
- Cybaeus jiriensis Seo, 2016 — Korea
- Cybaeus jogyensis Seo, 2016 — Korea
- Cybaeus kawabensis Irie & Ono, 2002 — Japan
- Cybaeus kiiensis Kobayashi, 2006 — Japan
- Cybaeus kirigaminensis Komatsu, 1963 — Japan
- Cybaeus kiuchii Komatsu, 1965 — Japan
- Cybaeus kodama Ihara, Koike & Nakano, 2021 — Japan (Ryukyu Is.)
- Cybaeus koikei Sugawara, Ihara & Nakano, 2021 — Japan
- Cybaeus kokuraensis Ihara, 2007 — Japan
- Cybaeus kompiraensis Ihara, 1968) — Japan
- Cybaeus kumadori Ihara, Koike & Nakano, 2021 — Japan (Ryukyu Is.)
- Cybaeus kumaensis Irie & Ono, 2001 — Japan
- Cybaeus kunashirensis Marusik & Logunov, 1991 — Russia (Sakhalin, Kurile Is.), Japan
- Cybaeus kunisakiensis Ihara, 2003 — Japan
- Cybaeus kuramotoi Yaginuma, 1963 — Japan
- Cybaeus lockeae Bennett, 2022 — USA
- Cybaeus logunovi Marusik & Omelko, 2022 — Russia (Far East)
- Cybaeus longus Paik, 1966 — Korea
- Cybaeus magnus Yaginuma, 1958 — Japan
- Cybaeus maritimus Marusik & Omelko, 2022 — Russia (Far East)
- Cybaeus melanoparvus Kobayashi, 2006 — Japan
- Cybaeus mellotteei (Simon, 1886) — Japan
- Cybaeus mikhailovi Marusik & Omelko, 2021 — Russia (Far East)
- Cybaeus mimasaka Ihara & Nojima, 2005 — Japan
- Cybaeus minoensis Kobayashi, 2006 — Japan
- Cybaeus minor Chyzer, 1897 — Europe
- Cybaeus miyagiensis Ihara, 2004 — Japan
- Cybaeus miyosii Yaginuma, 1941 — Japan
- Cybaeus momotaro Ihara & Nojima, 2005 — Japan
- Cybaeus montanus Maurer, 1992 — Switzerland, Italy
- Cybaeus monticola Kobayashi, 2006 — Japan
- Cybaeus morosus Simon, 1886 — USA, Canada
- Cybaeus mosanensis Paik & Namkung, 1967 — Korea
- Cybaeus multnoma Chamberlin & Ivie, 1942 — USA
- Cybaeus nagaiae Ihara, 2010 — Japan
- Cybaeus nagusa Ihara, 2010 — Japan
- Cybaeus nichikoensis Ihara, 1968) — Japan
- Cybaeus nipponicus (Uyemura, 1938) — Japan
- Cybaeus nishikawai Ihara, 1968) — Japan
- Cybaeus nojimai Ihara, 1993 — Japan
- Cybaeus obedientiarius Komatsu, 1963 — Japan
- Cybaeus odaensis Seo, 2016 — Korea
- Cybaeus okafujii Yaginuma, 1963 — Japan
- Cybaeus okayamaensis Ihara, 1993 — Japan
- Cybaeus okumae Ihara, 2010 — Japan
- Cybaeus okumurai Ihara, Koike & Nakano, 2021 — Japan (Ryukyu Is.)
- Cybaeus oligerae Marusik & Omelko, 2022 — Russia (Far East)
- Cybaeus opulentus Bennett, 2021 — USA
- Cybaeus orarius Bennett, 2021 — USA
- Cybaeus pan Bennett, 2021 — USA
- Cybaeus paralypropriapus Bennett, 2009 — USA
- Cybaeus parvus Seo, 2017 — Korea
- Cybaeus patritus Bishop & Crosby, 1926 — USA
- Cybaeus pearcei Bennett, 2019 — USA
- Cybaeus penedentatus Bennett, 2009 — USA
- Cybaeus petegarinus Yaginuma, 1972 — Japan
- Cybaeus piazzai Bennett, 2021 — USA
- Cybaeus pseudoauriculatus Lee, Yoo & Kim, 2021 — Korea
- Cybaeus rarispinosus Yaginuma, 1970 — Japan
- Cybaeus raymondi (Simon, 1916) — Pyrenees (Spain, France)
- Cybaeus reducens Chamberlin & Ivie, 1932 — USA
- Cybaeus reticulatus Simon, 1886 — USA, Canada
- Cybaeus rothi Bennett, 2016 — USA
- Cybaeus ryunoiwayaensis Komatsu, 1968 — Japan
- Cybaeus ryusenensis Ihara, 1968) — Japan
- Cybaeus sanbruno Bennett, 2009 — USA
- Cybaeus sanctus Ihara, 1942) — Japan
- Cybaeus sasakii Ihara, 2004 — Japan
- Cybaeus sasayamaensis Ihara, 2010 — Japan
- Cybaeus schusteri Bennett, 2019 — USA
- Cybaeus scopulatus Chamberlin & Ivie, 1942 — USA
- Cybaeus senzokuensis Ihara, 1968) — Japan
- Cybaeus seorakensis Seo, 2016 — Korea
- Cybaeus septatus Chamberlin & Ivie, 1942 — USA
- Cybaeus shingenni Komatsu, 1968 — Japan
- Cybaeus shinkaii Ihara, 1970) — Japan
- Cybaeus shoshoneus Chamberlin & Ivie, 1932 — USA
- Cybaeus signatus Keyserling, 1881 — Peru
- Cybaeus signifer Simon, 1886 — USA, Canada
- Cybaeus silicis Barrows, 1919 — USA
- Cybaeus simplex Roth, 1952 — USA
- Cybaeus sinuosus Fox, 1937 — Canada
- Cybaeus solanum Bennett, 2016 — USA
- Cybaeus somesbar Bennett, 2009 — USA
- Cybaeus songniensis Seo, 2016 — Korea
- Cybaeus strandi Kolosváry, 1934 — Romania
- Cybaeus striatipes Bösenberg & Strand, 1906 — Russia (Sakhalin, Kurile Is.), Japan
- Cybaeus tajimaensis Ihara & Nojima, 2005 — Japan
- Cybaeus takachihoensis Irie & Ono, 2010 — Japan
- Cybaeus takasawaensis Ihara, 1970) — Japan
- Cybaeus taraensis Irie & Ono, 2001 — Japan
- Cybaeus tardatus (Chamberlin, 1919) — USA
- Cybaeus tetricus (C. L. Koch, 1839) — Europe
- Cybaeus thermydrinos Bennett, 2009 — USA
- Cybaeus tokunoshimensis Ihara, Koike & Nakano, 2021 — Japan (Ryukyu Is.)
- Cybaeus topanga Bennett, 2021 — USA
- Cybaeus torosus Bennett, 2019 — USA
- Cybaeus tottoriensis Ihara, 1994 — Japan
- Cybaeus triangulus Paik, 1966 — Korea
- Cybaeus tsurugi Ihara, 2003 — Japan
- Cybaeus tsurusakii Ihara, 1993 — Japan
- Cybaeus ubicki Bennett, 2021 — USA
- Cybaeus uenoi (Yaginuma, 1970) — Japan
- Cybaeus urabandai Ihara, 2004 — Japan
- Cybaeus vanimaculatus Lee, Yoo & Kim, 2021 — Korea
- Cybaeus viator Bennett, 2022 — USA
- Cybaeus vignai Brignoli, 1977 — France, Italy
- Cybaeus vulpinus Bennett, 2009 — USA
- Cybaeus waynei Bennett, 2009 — USA
- Cybaeus whanseunensis Paik & Namkung, 1967 — Korea
- Cybaeus wilsonia Bennett, 2021 — USA
- Cybaeus yakushimensis Ihara, Koike & Nakano, 2021 — Japan (Ryukyu Is.)
- Cybaeus yeongwolensis Lee, Yoo & Kim, 2021 — Korea
- Cybaeus yoshiakii Yaginuma, 1968 — Japan
- Cybaeus yoshidai Ihara, 2004 — Japan
- Cybaeus yufuin Ihara, 2007 — Japan
- Cybaeus zenifukiensis Ihara, 1968) — Japan
