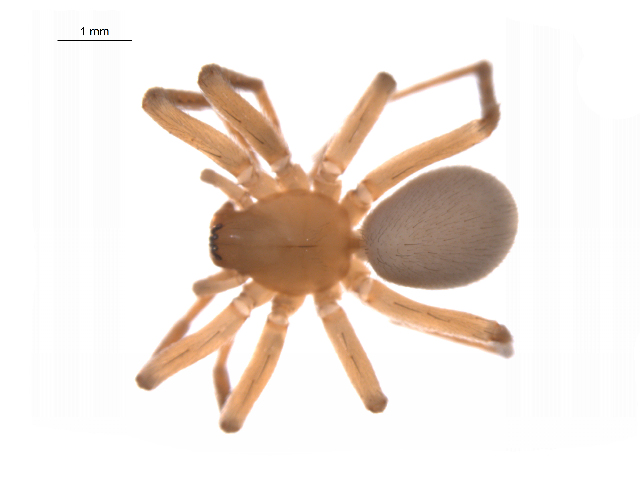
- C. minuta

Scientific classification
- Kingdom: Animalia
- Phylum: Arthropoda
- Subphylum: Chelicerata
- Class: Arachnida
- Order: Araneae
- Infraorder: Araneomorphae
- Family: Cybaeidae
- Genus: Cybaeina; Chamberlin & Ivie, 1932

Type species
- C. minuta (Banks, 1906)

Species
- 3, see text

= Cybaeina =

Genus of spiders

Cybaeina is a genus of North American araneomorph spiders in the family Cybaeidae, and was first described by R. V. Chamberlin & Wilton Ivie in 1932. Originally described from a single female found in Olympia, Washington, it was placed with the Cybaeidae in 1967.

== Species ==
As of July 2023 it contains three species, all found in North America:

- Cybaeina confusa Chamberlin & Ivie, 1942 – USA
- Cybaeina dixoni Bennett, 2023 – USA
- Cybaeina minuta (Banks, 1906) (type) – Canada, USA
