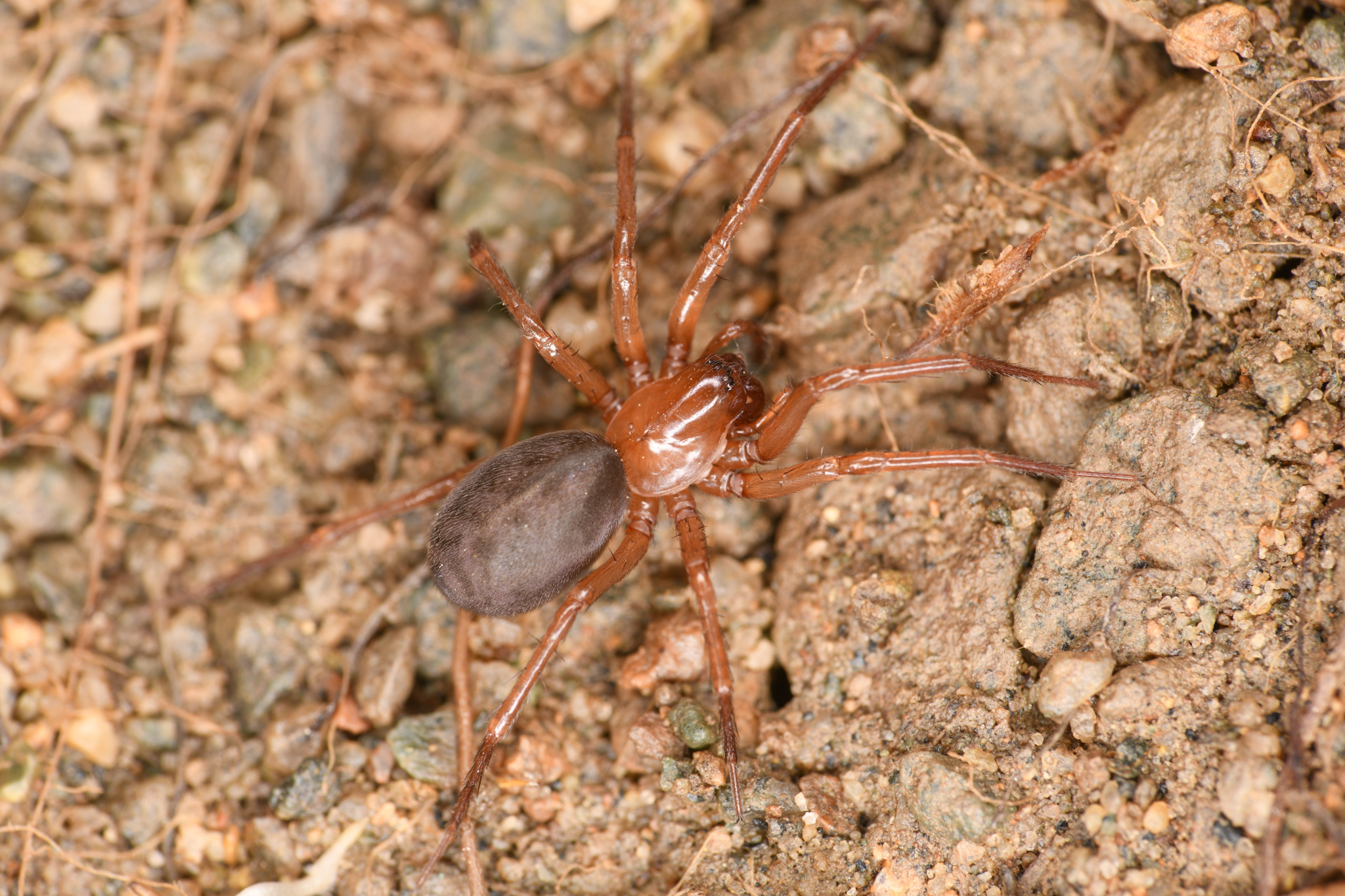
- Cybaeus charlesi
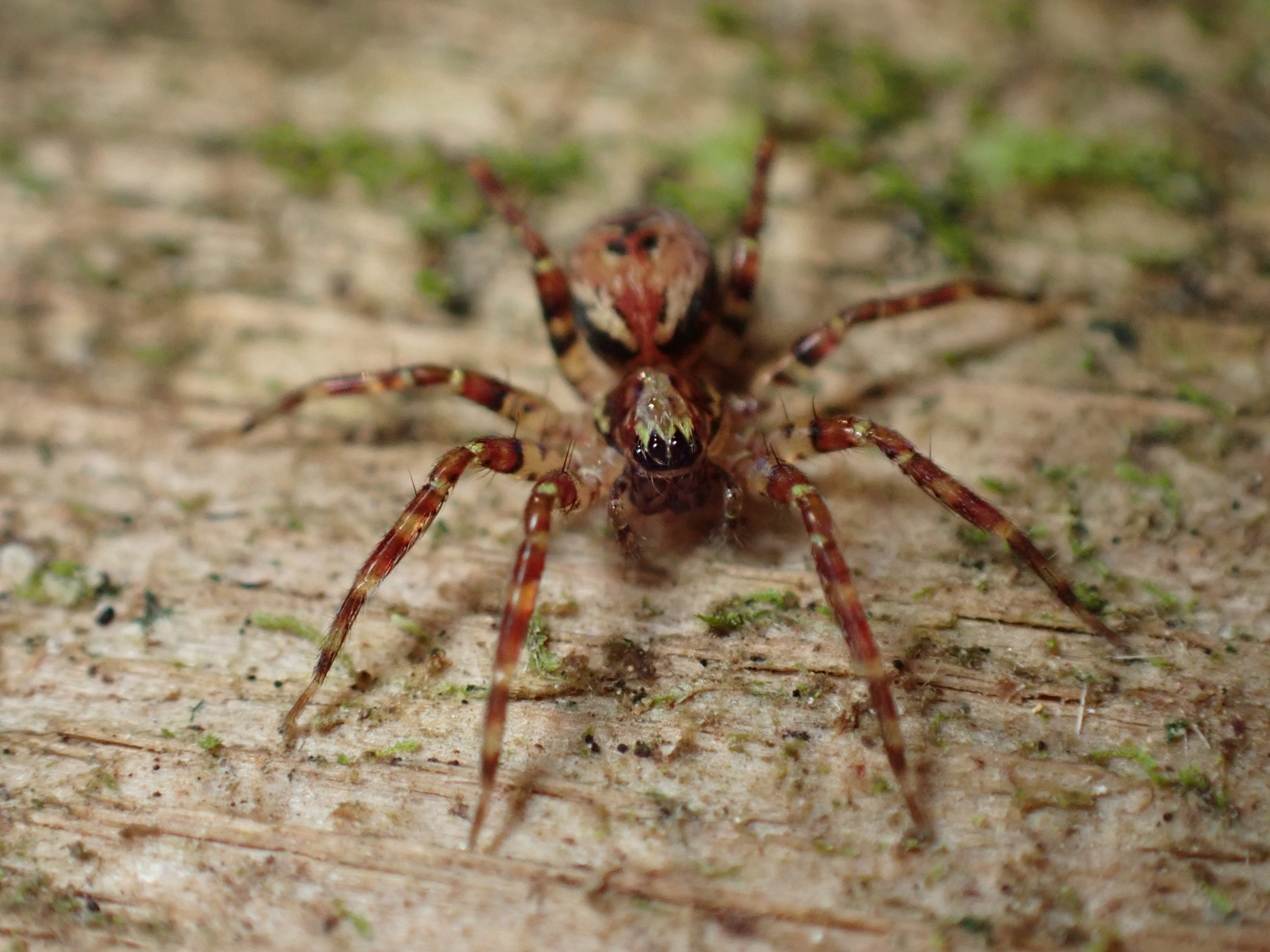
- Dirksia cinctipes in Canada

Scientific classification
- Kingdom: Animalia
- Phylum: Arthropoda
- Subphylum: Chelicerata
- Class: Arachnida
- Order: Araneae
- Infraorder: Araneomorphae
- Clade: Marronoid clade
- Family: Cybaeidae; Banks, 1892

Diversity
- 24 genera, 303 species

= Cybaeidae =

Cybaeidae Temporal range: Palaeogene–present

Family of spiders

Cybaeidae is a family of spiders first described by Nathan Banks in 1892. There are small to large sized entelegyne spiders, which are ecribellate. The diving bell spider or water spider Argyroneta aquatica was previously included in this family, but is now in the family Argyronetidae. The distribution of this species resembles closely a typical Holarctic biogeography, with all of their species being found in the northern hemisphere. Where they have a tendency to live beneath rocks or woody debris in shaded and cool forest habitats, but they can also be found in caves, ant nests, and moss on tree trunks. They are morphologically defined as spiders which have three claws, a single row of tarsal trichobothria, and posterior lateral spinnerets which lack a cribellum.

Most of the cybaeid genera are very species rich, as they have a large number of very short-range endemic species.

== Genera ==
As of January 2026, this family includes 24 genera and 303 species:

- Allocybaeina Bennett, 2020 – Japan, United States
- Blabomma Chamberlin & Ivie, 1937 – Korea, North America
- Calymmaria Chamberlin & Ivie, 1937 – North America
- Cryphoeca Thorell, 1870 – Japan, Turkey, Europe, North America
- Cryphoecina Deltshev, 1997 – Montenegro
- Cybaeina Chamberlin & Ivie, 1932 – Korea, North America
- Cybaeota Chamberlin & Ivie, 1933 – Russia, North America
- Cybaeozyga Chamberlin & Ivie, 1937 – United States
- Cybaeus L. Koch, 1868 – Asia, Europe, North America, Peru
- Dirksia Chamberlin & Ivie, 1942 – France, North America
- Ethobuella Chamberlin & Ivie, 1937 – North America
- Guicybaeus Wang, Chen, Yang & Zhang, 2023 – China
- Mastigusa Menge, 1854 – Algeria, Georgia, Iran, Turkey, Europe, Britain
- Neocryphoeca Roth, 1970 – United States
- Neocybaeina Bennett, 2023 – United States
- Pseudocybaeota Bennett, 2022 – United States
- Rothaeina Bennett, 2023 – United States
- Sincybaeus Wang & Zhang, 2022 – China, Japan
- Siskiyu Hedin, Ramírez & Monjaraz-Ruedas, 2025 – United States
- Symposia Simon, 1898 – Colombia, Venezuela
- Tuberta Simon, 1884 – Azerbaijan, Turkey, Europe, Britain
- Vagellia Simon, 1899 – Indonesia
- Willisus Roth, 1981 – United States
- Yorima Chamberlin & Ivie, 1942 – Cuba, United States

A fossil genus is also placed in this family:

- †Vectaraneus Selden, 2003 (Isle of Wight)
