= List of Symphytognathidae species =

This page lists all described species of the spider family Symphytognathidae accepted by the World Spider Catalog as of January 2021:

== Anapistula ==
Anapistula

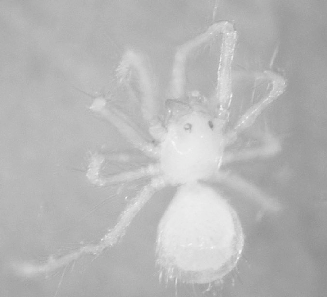
Anapistula appendix

Anapistula Gertsch, 1941

- A. appendix Tong & Li, 2006 — China
- A. aquytabuera Rheims & Brescovit, 2003 — Brazil
- A. ataecina Cardoso & Scharff, 2009 — Portugal
- A. australia Forster, 1959 — Australia (Queensland)
- A. ayri Rheims & Brescovit, 2003 — Brazil
- A. bebuia Rheims & Brescovit, 2003 — Brazil
- A. benoiti Forster & Platnick, 1977 — Congo
- A. bifurcata Harvey, 1998 — Australia (Northern Territory)
- A. boneti Forster, 1958 — Mexico
- A. caecula Baert & Jocqué, 1993 — Ivory Coast
- A. choojaiae Rivera-Quiroz, Petcharad & Miller, 2021 — Thailand
- A. cuttacutta Harvey, 1998 — Australia (Northern Territory)
- A. equatoriana Dupérré & Tapia, 2017 — Ecuador
- A. guyri Rheims & Brescovit, 2003 — Brazil
- A. ishikawai Ono, 2002 — Japan
- A. jerai Harvey, 1998 — Malaysia, Indonesia (Kalimantan, Krakatau), Borneo
- A. orbisterna Lin, Pham & Li, 2009 — Vietnam
- A. panensis Lin, Tao & Li, 2013 — China
- A. pocaruguara Rheims & Brescovit, 2003 — Brazil
- A. secreta Gertsch, 1941 (type) — USA to Colombia, Bahama Is., Jamaica
- A. seychellensis Saaristo, 1996 — Seychelles
- A. tonga Harvey, 1998 — Tonga
- A. troglobia Harvey, 1998 — Australia (Western Australia)
- A. ybyquyra Rheims & Brescovit, 2003 — Brazil
- A. yungas Rubio & González, 2010 — Argentina
- A. zhengi Lin, Tao & Li, 2013 — China

== Anapogonia ==
Anapogonia Simon, 1905

- A. lyrata Simon, 1905 (type) — Indonesia (Java)

== Crassignatha ==
Crassignatha

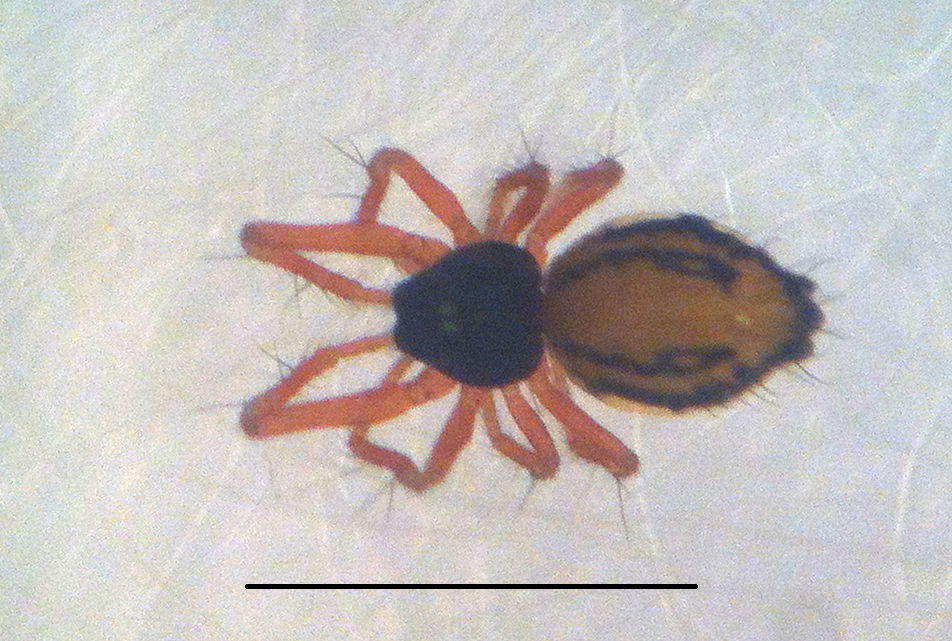
Crassignatha danaugirangensis, female

Crassignatha Wunderlich, 1995

- C. baihua Lin & S. Q. Li, 2020 — China
- C. bangbie Lin & S. Q. Li, 2020 — China
- C. bicorniventris (Lin & Li, 2009) — China (Hainan)
- C. changyan Lin & S. Q. Li, 2020 — China
- C. danaugirangensis Miller et al., 2014 — Borneo (Malaysia, Brunei)
- C. dongnai Lin & S. Q. Li, 2020 — Vietnam
- C. ertou Miller, Griswold & Yin, 2009 — China
- C. gucheng Lin & S. Q. Li, 2020 — China, Vietnam
- C. gudu Miller, Griswold & Yin, 2009 — China
- C. haeneli Wunderlich, 1995 (type) — Malaysia (Peninsula)
- C. longtou Miller, Griswold & Yin, 2009 — China
- C. mengla Lin & S. Q. Li, 2020 — China
- C. nantou Lin & S. Q. Li, 2020 — Taiwan
- C. nasalis Lin & S. Q. Li, 2020 — China
- C. pianma Miller, Griswold & Yin, 2009 — China
- C. quadriventris (Lin & Li, 2009) — China (Hainan)
- C. quanqu Miller, Griswold & Yin, 2009 — China
- C. rostriformis Lin & S. Q. Li, 2020 — China
- C. seedam Rivera-Quiroz, Petcharad & Miller, 2021 — Thailand
- C. seeliam Rivera-Quiroz, Petcharad & Miller, 2021 — Thailand
- C. shiluensis (Lin & Li, 2009) — China, Laos, Thailand
- C. shunani Lin & S. Q. Li, 2020 — China
- C. si Lin & S. Q. Li, 2020 — China
- C. spinathoraxi (Lin & Li, 2009) — China
- C. thamphra Lin & S. Q. Li, 2020 — Thailand
- C. xichou Lin & S. Q. Li, 2020 — China
- C. yamu Miller, Griswold & Yin, 2009 — China
- C. yinzhi Miller, Griswold & Yin, 2009 — China

== Curimagua ==
Curimagua Forster & Platnick, 1977

- C. bayano Forster & Platnick, 1977 — Panama
- C. chapmani Forster & Platnick, 1977 (type) — Venezuela

== Globignatha ==
Globignatha Balogh & Loksa, 1968

- G. rohri (Balogh & Loksa, 1968) (type) — Brazil
- G. sedgwicki Forster & Platnick, 1977 — Belize

== Iardinis ==
Iardinis Simon, 1899

- I. martensi Brignoli, 1978 — Nepal
- I. mussardi Brignoli, 1980 — India

== Patu ==
Patu Marples, 1951

- P. bispina Lin, Pham & Li, 2009 — Vietnam
- P. digua Forster & Platnick, 1977 — Colombia
- P. eberhardi Forster & Platnick, 1977 — Colombia
- P. jidanweishi Miller, Griswold & Yin, 2009 — China
- P. kishidai Shinkai, 2009 — Japan
- P. marplesi Forster, 1959 — Samoa
- P. nigeri Lin & Li, 2009 — China
- P. qiqi Miller, Griswold & Yin, 2009 — China
- P. saladito Forster & Platnick, 1977 — Colombia
- P. samoensis Marples, 1951 — Samoa
- P. silho Saaristo, 1996 — Seychelles
- P. vitiensis Marples, 1951 (type) — Fiji
- P. woodwardi Forster, 1959 — New Guinea
- P. xiaoxiao Miller, Griswold & Yin, 2009 — China

== Symphytognatha ==
Symphytognatha Hickman, 1931

- S. blesti Forster & Platnick, 1977 — Australia (New South Wales)
- S. brasiliana Balogh & Loksa, 1968 — Brazil
- S. cabezota Dupérré & Tapia, 2017 — Ecuador
- S. carstica Brescovit, Álvares & Lopes, 2004 — Brazil
- S. chickeringi Forster & Platnick, 1977 — Jamaica
- S. fouldsi Harvey, 2001 — Australia (Western Australia)
- S. gertschi Forster & Platnick, 1977 — Mexico
- S. globosa Hickman, 1931 (type) — Australia (Tasmania)
- S. goodnightorum Forster & Platnick, 1977 — Belize
- S. imbulunga Griswold, 1987 — South Africa
- S. milleri Lin, 2019 — China
- S. orghidani Georgescu, 1988 — Cuba
- S. picta Harvey, 1992 — Australia (Western Australia)
- S. tacaca Brescovit, Álvares & Lopes, 2004 — Brazil
- S. ulur Platnick, 1979 — New Guinea
