= List of Synaphridae species =

This page lists all described species of the spider family Synaphridae accepted by the World Spider Catalog as of December 2020:

== Africepheia ==
Africepheia Miller, 2007

- A. madagascariensis Miller, 2007 (type) — Madagascar

== Cepheia ==
Cepheia Simon, 1894

- C. longiseta (Simon, 1881) (type) — Southern Europe

== † Iardinidis ==
† Iardinidis Wunderlich, 2004

- † I. brevipes Wunderlich, 2004

== Synaphris ==
Synaphris Simon, 1894

- S. agaetensis Wunderlich, 1987 — Canary Is.
- S. calerensis Wunderlich, 1987 — Canary Is.
- S. dalmatensis Wunderlich, 1980 — Croatia
- S. franzi Wunderlich, 1987 — Canary Is.
- S. lehtineni Marusik, Gnelitsa & Kovblyuk, 2005 — Romania, Bulgaria, Ukraine
- S. letourneuxi (Simon, 1884) (type) — Egypt
- S. orientalis Marusik & Lehtinen, 2003 — Turkmenistan, Iran?
- S. saphrynis Lopardo, Hormiga & Melic, 2007 — Spain, Savage Is.?
- S. schlingeri Miller, 2007 — Madagascar
- S. toliara Miller, 2007 — Madagascar
- S. wunderlichi Marusik & Zonstein, 2011 — Israel
