= Theonoe (spider) =

Scientific classification
- Kingdom: Animalia
- Phylum: Arthropoda
- Subphylum: Chelicerata
- Class: Arachnida
- Order: Araneae
- Infraorder: Araneomorphae
- Family: Theridiidae
- Genus: Theonoe; Simon, 1881

Type species
- T. minutissima (O. Pickard-Cambridge, 1879)

Species
- 6, see text

Genus of spiders

Theonoe is a genus of comb-footed spiders that was first described by Eugène Louis Simon in 1881.

== Species ==
As of June 2020 it contains six species:

- Theonoe africana Caporiacco, 1947 – Tanzania
- Theonoe formivora (Walckenaer, 1841) – France
- Theonoe major Denis, 1961 – Spain
- Theonoe minutissima (O. Pickard-Cambridge, 1879) (type) – Europe
- Theonoe sola Thaler & Steinberger, 1988 – Germany, Austria
- Theonoe stridula Crosby, 1906 – USA, Canada

Formerly included:

- T. americana Simon, 1897 (Transferred to Thymoites)
- T. detriticola Miller, 1970 (Transferred to Carniella)
- T. globifera Simon, 1899 (Transferred to Carniella)
- T. mihaili (Georgescu, 1989) (Transferred to Carniella)
- T. striatipes Petrunkevitch, 1930 (Transferred to Eidmannella)
- T. weyersi Brignoli, 1979 (Transferred to Carniella)

Nomen dubium

- T. fusca (Blackwall, 1841
