= Carniella sumatraensis =

Scientific classification
- Domain: Eukaryota
- Kingdom: Animalia
- Phylum: Arthropoda
- Subphylum: Chelicerata
- Class: Arachnida
- Order: Araneae
- Infraorder: Araneomorphae
- Family: Theridiidae
- Genus: Carniella
- Species: C. sumatraensis

Binomial name
- Carniella sumatraensis Wunderlich, 1995

Species of spider

Carniella sumatraensis is a species of comb-footed spider in the family Theridiidae. It is found in Sumatra.
