= Carniella detriticola =

Scientific classification
- Domain: Eukaryota
- Kingdom: Animalia
- Phylum: Arthropoda
- Subphylum: Chelicerata
- Class: Arachnida
- Order: Araneae
- Infraorder: Araneomorphae
- Family: Theridiidae
- Genus: Carniella
- Species: C. detriticola

Binomial name
- Carniella detriticola (Miller, 1970)

Synonyms
- Theonoe detriticola Miller, 1970

Species of spider

Carniella detriticola is a species of comb-footed spider in the family Theridiidae. It is found in Angola.
