= Patu marplesi =

Scientific classification
- Kingdom: Animalia
- Phylum: Arthropoda
- Subphylum: Chelicerata
- Class: Arachnida
- Order: Araneae
- Infraorder: Araneomorphae
- Family: Symphytognathidae
- Genus: Patu
- Species: P. marplesi

Binomial name
- Patu marplesi Forster, 1959

Species of spider

Patu marplesi is a species of small spiders, endemic to Samoa. It is considered the smallest spider in the world, as male legspan is 0.46 mm (0.018 in).

== See also ==
- Smallest organisms
