= Anapistula seychellensis =

Conservation status
- Endangered (IUCN 3.1)

Scientific classification
- Kingdom: Animalia
- Phylum: Arthropoda
- Subphylum: Chelicerata
- Class: Arachnida
- Order: Araneae
- Infraorder: Araneomorphae
- Family: Symphytognathidae
- Genus: Anapistula
- Species: A. seychellensis

Binomial name
- Anapistula seychellensis Saaristo, 1996

Species of spider

Anapistula seychellensis is a species of araneomorph spider that is endemic to the islands of Silhouette, Praslin and Curieuse in the Seychelles. It was first described by Michael Saaristo in 1996. It can be found in woodland habitats in leaf litter. It is threatened by habitat degradation caused by invasive plant species, especially Cinnamomum verum.
