= Carniella schwendingeri =

Scientific classification
- Domain: Eukaryota
- Kingdom: Animalia
- Phylum: Arthropoda
- Subphylum: Chelicerata
- Class: Arachnida
- Order: Araneae
- Infraorder: Araneomorphae
- Family: Theridiidae
- Genus: Carniella
- Species: C. schwendingeri

Binomial name
- Carniella schwendingeri Knoflach, 1996

Species of spider

Carniella schwendingeri is a species of comb-footed spider in the family Theridiidae. It is found in Thailand.
