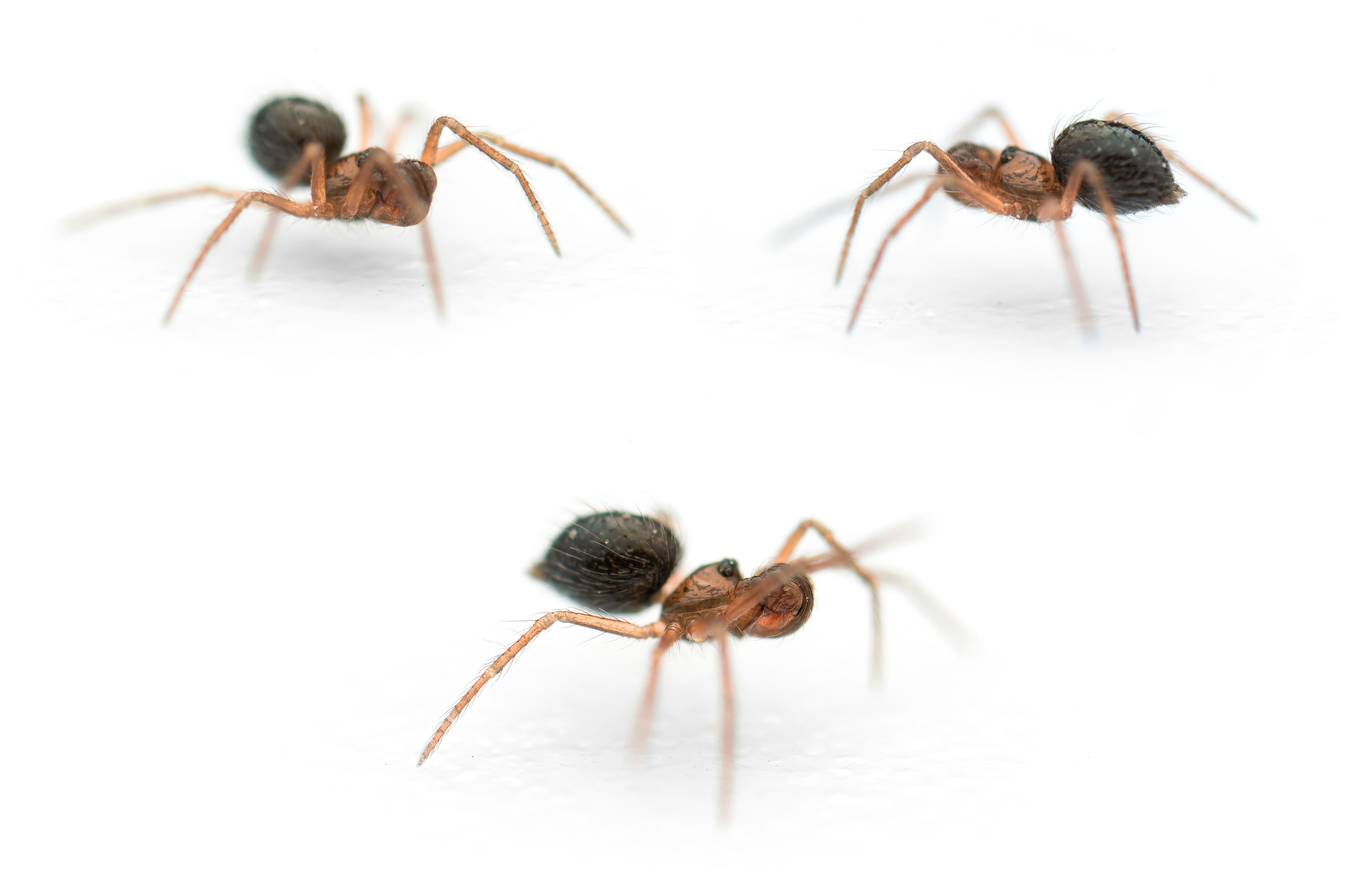
- C. longiseta
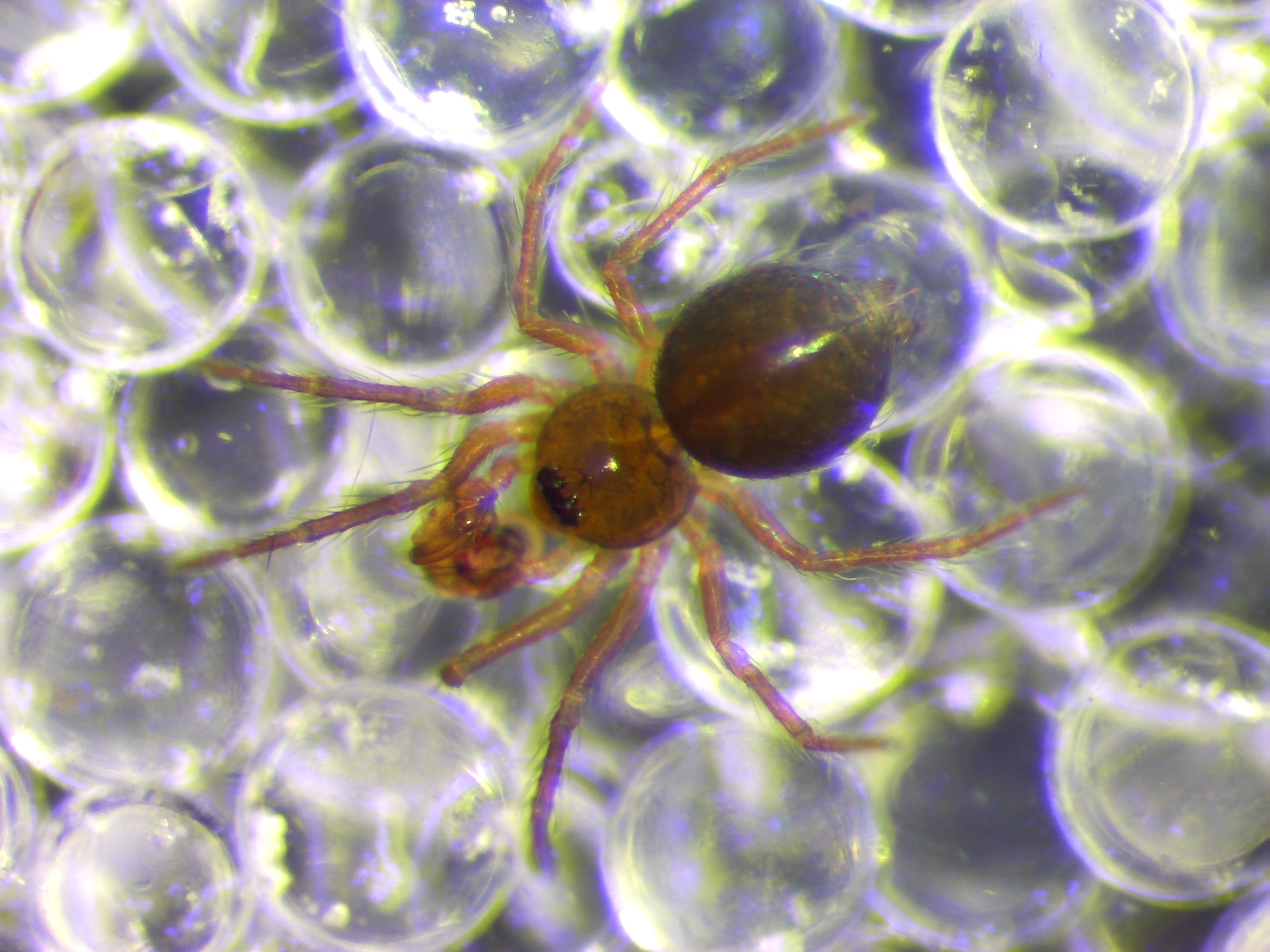
- C. longiseta in France

Scientific classification
- Kingdom: Animalia
- Phylum: Arthropoda
- Subphylum: Chelicerata
- Class: Arachnida
- Order: Araneae
- Infraorder: Araneomorphae
- Family: Synaphridae
- Genus: Cepheia; Simon, 1894
- Species: C. longiseta

Binomial name
- Cepheia longiseta (Simon, 1881)

= Cepheia =

Genus of spiders

Cepheia is a monotypic genus of European araneomorph spiders in the family Synaphridae containing the single species, Cepheia longiseta. It was first described as Theonoe longiseta in 1881, and was moved to its own genus in 1894. Originally placed with the tangle-web spiders, it was moved several times before settling in the Synaphridae in 2003. Paolo Brignoli noted that it is an unidentifiable theridiid.
