= Carniella brignolii =

Scientific classification
- Kingdom: Animalia
- Phylum: Arthropoda
- Subphylum: Chelicerata
- Class: Arachnida
- Order: Araneae
- Infraorder: Araneomorphae
- Family: Theridiidae
- Genus: Carniella
- Species: C. brignolii

Binomial name
- Carniella brignolii Thaler & Steinberger, 1988

Species of spider

Carniella brignolii is a tangle web spider species found in Belgium, Switzerland, Germany and Austria.
