= Synaphris =

Scientific classification
- Kingdom: Animalia
- Phylum: Arthropoda
- Subphylum: Chelicerata
- Class: Arachnida
- Order: Araneae
- Infraorder: Araneomorphae
- Family: Synaphridae
- Genus: Synaphris; Simon, 1894

Type species
- S. letourneuxi (Simon, 1884)

Species
- 11, see text
- blue: reported countries (WSC)

Genus of spiders

Synaphris is a genus of araneomorph spiders in the family Synaphridae, and was first described by Eugène Louis Simon in 1894. Originally placed with the tangle web spiders, it was moved to the Symphytognathidae in 1973, and to the Synaphridae in 2003.

== Distribution ==
Spiders in this genus are found in North Africa, Madagascar, Canary Islands and from Spain to Iran.

== Species ==
As of January 2026, this genus includes eleven species:

- Synaphris agaetensis Wunderlich, 1987 – Canary Islands
- Synaphris calerensis Wunderlich, 1987 – Canary Islands
- Synaphris dalmatensis Wunderlich, 1980 – Croatia
- Synaphris franzi Wunderlich, 1987 – Canary Islands
- Synaphris lehtineni Marusik, Gnelitsa & Kovblyuk, 2005 – Ukraine, Romania, Bulgaria, Greece, Turkey
- Synaphris letourneuxi (Simon, 1884) – Tunisia, Egypt
- Synaphris orientalis Marusik & Lehtinen, 2003 – Turkmenistan, Iran?
- Synaphris saphrynis Lopardo, Hormiga & Melic, 2007 – Spain, Savage Islands?
- Synaphris schlingeri Miller, 2007 – Madagascar
- Synaphris toliara Miller, 2007 – Madagascar
- Synaphris wunderlichi Marusik & Zonstein, 2011 – Israel
