= Kirinua =

Scientific classification
- Kingdom: Animalia
- Phylum: Arthropoda
- Subphylum: Chelicerata
- Class: Arachnida
- Order: Araneae
- Infraorder: Araneomorphae
- Family: Symphytognathidae
- Genus: Kirinua; S. Q. Li & Lin, 2021

Type species
- K. maguai S. Q. Li & Lin

Species
- 4, see text

Genus of spiders

Kirinua is a genus of spiders in the family Symphytognathidae.

== Distribution ==
All described species of Kirinua are endemic to China.

== Etymology ==
The genus is named after mythical creature Kirin.

== Species ==
As of January 2026, this genus includes four species:

- Kirinua jinlong He, Liu, Zhu & Guo, 2024 – China
- Kirinua maguai S. Q. Li & Lin, 2021 – China
- Kirinua yangshuo S. Q. Li & Lin, 2021 – China
- Kirinua zhengqizhangi Lin & Li, 2024 – China
