= Carniella globifera =

Scientific classification
- Kingdom: Animalia
- Phylum: Arthropoda
- Subphylum: Chelicerata
- Class: Arachnida
- Order: Araneae
- Infraorder: Araneomorphae
- Family: Theridiidae
- Genus: Carniella
- Species: C. globifera

Binomial name
- Carniella globifera (Simon, 1899)

Synonyms
- Theonoe globifera Simon, 1899

Species of spider

Carniella globifera is a species of comb-footed spider in the family Theridiidae. It is found in Sumatra.
