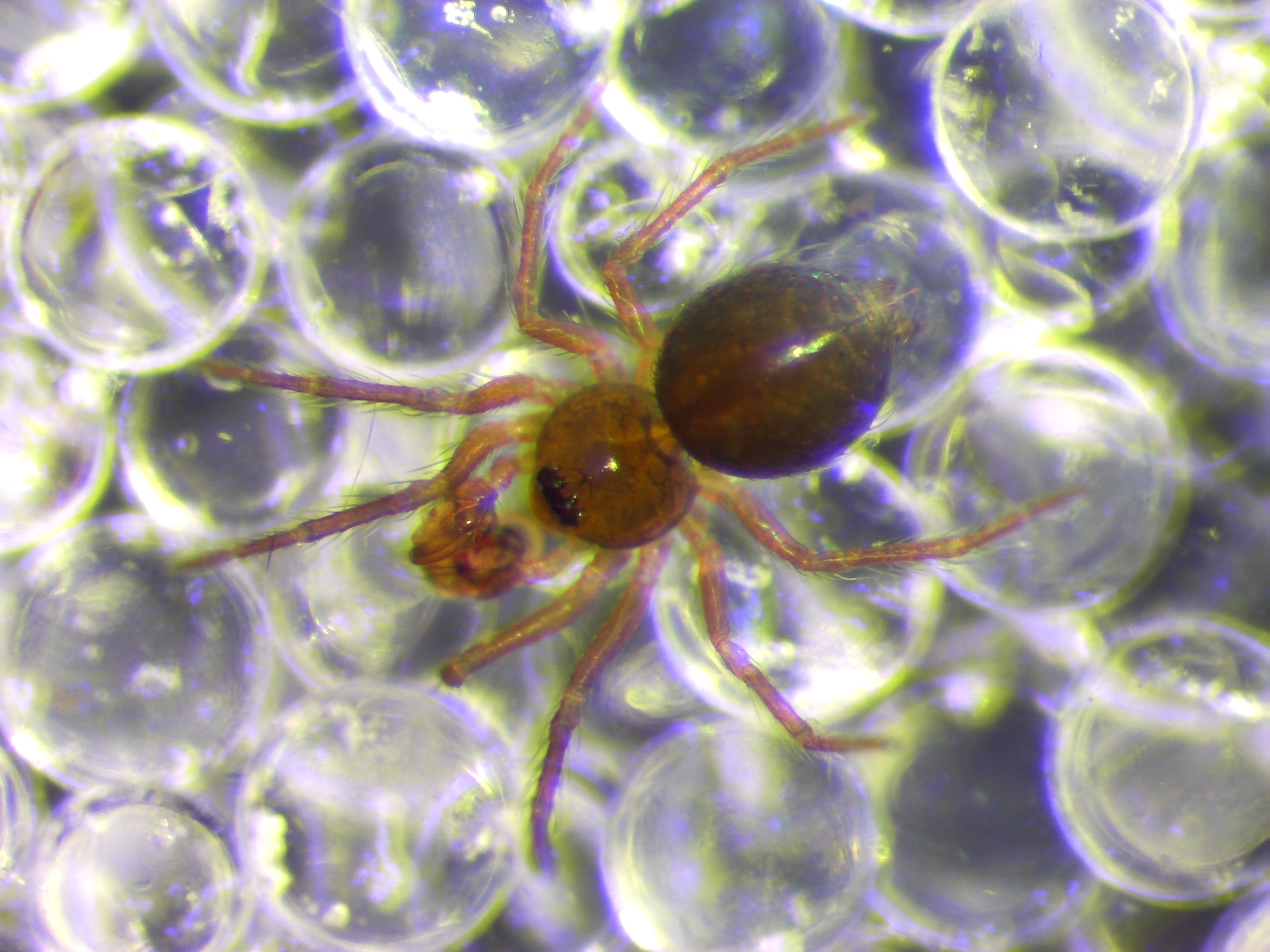
- male Cepheia longiseta from France

Scientific classification
- Kingdom: Animalia
- Phylum: Arthropoda
- Subphylum: Chelicerata
- Class: Arachnida
- Order: Araneae
- Infraorder: Araneomorphae
- Family: Synaphridae; Wunderlich, 1986

Genera
- Africepheia Miller, 2007; Cepheia Simon, 1894; Synaphris Simon, 1894

Diversity
- 3 genera, 13 species
- blue: reported countries (WSC)

= Synaphridae =

Synaphridae Temporal range: Palaeogene–present

Family of spiders

Synaphridae is a family of spiders with thirteen described species in three genera. It was first described as a subfamily of Anapidae, but it has since been raised to family status.

== Genera ==
As of January 2026, this family includes three genera and thirteen species:

- Africepheia Miller, 2007 – Madagascar
- Cepheia Simon, 1894 – Southern Europe
- Synaphris Simon, 1894 – Madagascar, Egypt, Tunisia, Turkmenistan, Iran?, Israel, Turkey, Europe, Savage Islands?
