= Swilda =

Scientific classification
- Kingdom: Animalia
- Phylum: Arthropoda
- Subphylum: Chelicerata
- Class: Arachnida
- Order: Araneae
- Infraorder: Araneomorphae
- Family: Symphytognathidae
- Genus: Swilda; S. Q. Li & Lin, 2021

Type species
- Crassignatha longtou Miller, Griswold & Yin, 2009

Species
- 2, see text

Genus of spiders

Swilda is a genus of spiders in the family Symphytognathidae.

== Distribution ==
Swilda is known from China. Both described species are endemic to Yunnan.

== Etymology ==
The genus is named in honor of "Swild Studio" (西南山地工作室; Xīnán shāndì gōngzuò shì), »for its dedication to promoting public advocacy for wildlife conservation and nature education in southwest China».

== Species ==
As of January 2026, this genus includes two species:

- Swilda longtou (Miller, Griswold & Yin, 2009) – China
- Swilda spinathoraxi (Lin & Li, 2009) – China
