= Patu (spider) =

Scientific classification
- Kingdom: Animalia
- Phylum: Arthropoda
- Subphylum: Chelicerata
- Class: Arachnida
- Order: Araneae
- Infraorder: Araneomorphae
- Family: Symphytognathidae
- Genus: Patu; Marples, 1951

Type species
- P. vitiensis Marples, 1951

Species
- 18, see text

Genus of spiders

Patu is a genus of dwarf orb-weavers that was first described by Brian John Marples in 1951. Two candidates for the "smallest species of spider", are in this genus, Patu digua and Patu marplesi.

== Distribution ==
Spiders in this genus are found in Asia, Oceania, on the Seychelles, and in Colombia.

== Species ==
As of January 2026, this genus includes eighteen species:

- Patu catba S. Q. Li & Lin, 2021 – Vietnam
- Patu dakou S. Q. Li & Lin, 2021 – China
- Patu damtao S. Q. Li & Lin, 2021 – Vietnam
- Patu digua Forster & Platnick, 1977 – Colombia
- Patu eberhardi Forster & Platnick, 1977 – Colombia
- Patu jiangzhou S. Q. Li & Lin, 2021 – China
- Patu jidanweishi Miller, Griswold & Yin, 2009 – China
- Patu marplesi Forster, 1959 – Samoa
- Patu nagarat S. Q. Li & Lin, 2021 – Thailand
- Patu nigeri Lin & Li, 2009 – China
- Patu putao S. Q. Li & Lin, 2021 – Myanmar
- Patu qiqi Miller, Griswold & Yin, 2009 – China
- Patu saladito Forster & Platnick, 1977 – Colombia
- Patu samoensis Marples, 1951 – Samoa
- Patu silho Saaristo, 1996 – Seychelles
- Patu vitiensis Marples, 1951 – Fiji
- Patu woodwardi Forster, 1959 – New Guinea
- Patu xiaoxiao Miller, Griswold & Yin, 2009 – China
