= Iardinis =

Scientific classification
- Kingdom: Animalia
- Phylum: Arthropoda
- Subphylum: Chelicerata
- Class: Arachnida
- Order: Araneae
- Infraorder: Araneomorphae
- Family: Symphytognathidae
- Genus: Iardinis; Simon

Species
- Iardinis martensi Brignoli, 1978 - Nepal; Iardinis mussardi Brignoli, 1980 - India

Genus of spiders

Iardinis is a genus of spiders in the family Symphytognathidae. It was first described in 1899 by Simon. As of 2016, it contains 2 species.
