= Globignatha =

Scientific classification
- Kingdom: Animalia
- Phylum: Arthropoda
- Subphylum: Chelicerata
- Class: Arachnida
- Order: Araneae
- Infraorder: Araneomorphae
- Family: Symphytognathidae
- Genus: Globignatha; Balogh & Loksa, 1968

Type species
- G. rohri (Balogh & Loksa, 1968)

Species
- G. rohri (Balogh & Loksa, 1968) – Brazil; G. sedgwicki Forster & Platnick, 1977 – Belize

Genus of spiders

Globignatha is a genus of dwarf orb-weavers that was first described by J. Balogh & I. Loksa in 1968. As of September 2019 it contains two species, found in Belize and Brazil: G. rohri and G. sedgwicki.
