= Patu digua =

Scientific classification
- Kingdom: Animalia
- Phylum: Arthropoda
- Subphylum: Chelicerata
- Class: Arachnida
- Order: Araneae
- Infraorder: Araneomorphae
- Family: Symphytognathidae
- Genus: Patu
- Species: P. digua

Binomial name
- Patu digua Forster & Platnick, 1977

Species of spider

Patu digua is a very small species of spider. The male holotype and female paratype were collected from Río Digua, near Queremal, Valle del Cauca, in Colombia.

By some accounts it is the smallest spider in the world, as males reach a body size of only about 0.37 mm (0.015 in)—roughly one fifth the size of the head of a pin.

The use of the spider as a necrobotic gripping tool in microscopic manipulations was suggested in 2022.

== See also ==
- Smallest organisms
