= Carniella weyersi =

Scientific classification
- Domain: Eukaryota
- Kingdom: Animalia
- Phylum: Arthropoda
- Subphylum: Chelicerata
- Class: Arachnida
- Order: Araneae
- Infraorder: Araneomorphae
- Family: Theridiidae
- Genus: Carniella
- Species: C. weyersi

Binomial name
- Carniella weyersi (Brignoli, 1979)

Synonyms
- Theonoe weyersi Brignoli, 1979

Species of spider

Carniella weyersi is a species of comb-footed spider in the family Theridiidae. It is found in China and Sumatra.

The species was first described by Brignoli in 1979, placed with the genus Theone.
