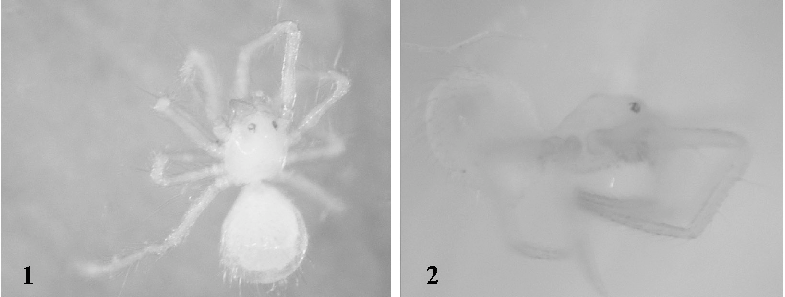

Scientific classification
- Kingdom: Animalia
- Phylum: Arthropoda
- Subphylum: Chelicerata
- Class: Arachnida
- Order: Araneae
- Infraorder: Araneomorphae
- Family: Symphytognathidae
- Genus: Anapistula; Gertsch, 1941

Type species
- A. secreta Gertsch, 1941

Species
- 34, see text
- blue: reported countries (WSC)

= Anapistula =

Genus of spiders

Anapistula is a genus of dwarf orb-weavers that was first described by Willis J. Gertsch in 1941.

== Distribution ==
Spiders in this genus are mostly found in South America, Africa, and Asia. One species reaches north into the USA, three species are endemic to Australia, and two on the Iberian Peninsula.

== Species ==
As of January 2026, this genus includes 34 species:

- Anapistula appendix Tong & Li, 2006 – China
- Anapistula aquytabuera Rheims & Brescovit, 2003 – Brazil
- Anapistula ataecina Cardoso & Scharff, 2009 – Portugal
- Anapistula australia Forster, 1959 – Australia (Queensland)
- Anapistula ayri Rheims & Brescovit, 2003 – Brazil
- Anapistula barbara Brescovit & Cizauskas, 2025 – Brazil
- Anapistula bebuia Rheims & Brescovit, 2003 – Brazil
- Anapistula benoiti Forster & Platnick, 1977 – DR Congo
- Anapistula bifurcata Harvey, 1998 – Australia (Northern Territory)
- Anapistula boneti Forster, 1958 – Mexico
- Anapistula caecula Baert & Jocqué, 1993 – Ivory Coast
- Anapistula choojaiae Rivera-Quiroz, Petcharad & Miller, 2021 – Thailand
- Anapistula cuttacutta Harvey, 1998 – Australia (Northern Territory)
- Anapistula delrosalae Pertegal & Barranco, 2025 – Spain
- Anapistula equatoriana Dupérré & Tapia, 2017 – Ecuador
- Anapistula guyri Rheims & Brescovit, 2003 – Brazil
- Anapistula ishikawai Ono, 2002 – Japan
- Anapistula jerai Harvey, 1998 – Malaysia (Borneo), Indonesia (Borneo, Krakatau)
- Anapistula martinae Sherwood, Harvey, Fowler, Joshua, Stevens, Scipio-O’Dean & Ellick, 2024 – St. Helena
- Anapistula minadopico Brescovit & Cizauskas, 2025 – Brazil
- Anapistula orbisterna Lin, Pham & Li, 2009 – Vietnam
- Anapistula panensis Lin, Tao & Li, 2013 – China
- Anapistula pocaruguara Rheims & Brescovit, 2003 – Brazil
- Anapistula sanjiao S. Q. Li & Lin, 2022 – China
- Anapistula secreta Gertsch, 1941 – USA to Colombia, Bahamas, Jamaica, Galapagos
- Anapistula serpentina Brescovit & Cizauskas, 2025 – Brazil
- Anapistula seychellensis Saaristo, 1996 – Seychelles
- Anapistula tiputiana Zamani & Marusik, 2024 – Ecuador
- Anapistula tonga Harvey, 1998 – Tonga
- Anapistula troglobia Harvey, 1998 – Australia (Western Australia)
- Anapistula walayaku S. Q. Li & Lin, 2022 – China
- Anapistula ybyquyra Rheims & Brescovit, 2003 – Brazil
- Anapistula yungas Rubio & González, 2010 – Argentina
- Anapistula zhengi Lin, Tao & Li, 2013 – China
