= Africepheia =

Scientific classification
- Kingdom: Animalia
- Phylum: Arthropoda
- Subphylum: Chelicerata
- Class: Arachnida
- Order: Araneae
- Infraorder: Araneomorphae
- Family: Synaphridae
- Genus: Africepheia; Miller, 2007
- Species: A. madagascariensis

Binomial name
- Africepheia madagascariensis Miller, 2007

Genus of spiders

Africepheia is a monotypic genus of Malagasy araneomorph spiders in the family Synaphridae containing the single species, Africepheia madagascariensis. It was first described by J. A. Miller in 2007, and is found on Madagascar.
