= Anapogonia =

Scientific classification
- Kingdom: Animalia
- Phylum: Arthropoda
- Subphylum: Chelicerata
- Class: Arachnida
- Order: Araneae
- Infraorder: Araneomorphae
- Family: Symphytognathidae
- Genus: Anapogonia; Simon, 1905
- Species: A. lyrata

Binomial name
- Anapogonia lyrata Simon, 1905

Genus of spiders

Anapogonia is a monotypic genus of dwarf orb-weavers found on Java containing the single species, Anapogonia lyrata. Only the male of the species is known, described by Eugène Louis Simon in 1905. Every other species placed here has been moved to other genera, including Caledanapis, Maxanapis, and Spinanapis.
