= Carniella =

Scientific classification
- Kingdom: Animalia
- Phylum: Arthropoda
- Subphylum: Chelicerata
- Class: Arachnida
- Order: Araneae
- Infraorder: Araneomorphae
- Family: Theridiidae
- Genus: Carniella; Thaler & Steinberger, 1988

Type species
- C. brignolii Thaler & Steinberger, 1988

Species
- 15, see text

Synonyms
- Marianana Georgescu, 1989

Genus of spiders

Carniella is a genus of comb-footed spiders that was first described by K. Thaler & K.-H. Steinberger in 1988.

== Distribution ==
Spiders in this genus are found in Asia, Europe, with one species endemic to Angola.

== Species ==
As of October 2025, this genus includes fifteen species:

- Carniella brignolii Thaler & Steinberger, 1988 – Belgium, Switzerland, Germany, Austria, Czech Republic, Romania (type species)
- Carniella coreana Kim & Yoo, 2018 – Korea
- Carniella detriticola (Miller, 1970) – Angola
- Carniella foliosa Gao & Li, 2014 – China
- Carniella forficata Gao & Li, 2014 – China
- Carniella globifera (Simon, 1899) – Indonesia (Sumatra)
- Carniella krakatauensis Wunderlich, 1995 – Indonesia (Krakatau)
- Carniella nepalensis Tanasevitch & Marusik, 2020 – Nepal
- Carniella orites Knoflach, 1996 – Thailand
- Carniella schwendingeri Knoflach, 1996 – Thailand
- Carniella siam Knoflach, 1996 – Thailand
- Carniella strumifera Gao & Li, 2014 – China
- Carniella sumatraensis Wunderlich, 1995 – Indonesia (Sumatra)
- Carniella tsurui Ono, 2007 – Taiwan
- Carniella weyersi (Brignoli, 1979) – China, Indonesia (Sumatra)
