= Symphytognatha =

Scientific classification
- Kingdom: Animalia
- Phylum: Arthropoda
- Subphylum: Chelicerata
- Class: Arachnida
- Order: Araneae
- Infraorder: Araneomorphae
- Family: Symphytognathidae
- Genus: Symphytognatha; Hickman, 1931

Type species
- S. globosa Hickman, 1931

Species
- 15, see text

Genus of spiders

Symphytognatha is a genus of dwarf orb-weavers that was first described by V. V. Hickman in 1931.

== Species ==
As of October 2025, this genus includes fifteen species:

- Symphytognatha blesti Forster & Platnick, 1977 – Australia (New South Wales)
- Symphytognatha brasiliana Balogh & Loksa, 1968 – Brazil
- Symphytognatha cabezota Dupérré & Tapia, 2017 – Ecuador
- Symphytognatha carstica Brescovit, Álvares & Lopes, 2004 – Brazil
- Symphytognatha chickeringi Forster & Platnick, 1977 – Jamaica
- Symphytognatha fouldsi Harvey, 2001 – Australia (Western Australia)
- Symphytognatha gertschi Forster & Platnick, 1977 – Mexico
- Symphytognatha globosa Hickman, 1931 – Australia (Tasmania) (type species)
- Symphytognatha goodnightorum Forster & Platnick, 1977 – Belize
- Symphytognatha imbulunga Griswold, 1987 – South Africa
- Symphytognatha milleri Lin, 2019 – China
- Symphytognatha orghidani Georgescu, 1988 – Cuba
- Symphytognatha picta Harvey, 1992 – Australia (Western Australia)
- Symphytognatha tacaca Brescovit, Álvares & Lopes, 2004 – Brazil
- Symphytognatha ulur Platnick, 1979 – New Guinea
