= Curimagua =

Scientific classification
- Kingdom: Animalia
- Phylum: Arthropoda
- Subphylum: Chelicerata
- Class: Arachnida
- Order: Araneae
- Infraorder: Araneomorphae
- Family: Symphytognathidae
- Genus: Curimagua; Forster & Platnick, 1977

Type species
- C. chapmani Forster & Platnick, 1977

Species
- C. bayano Forster & Platnick, 1977 – Panama; C. chapmani Forster & Platnick, 1977 – Venezuela

Genus of spiders

Curimagua is a genus of dwarf orb-weavers that was first described by Raymond Robert Forster & Norman I. Platnick in 1977. As of September 2019 it contains two species, found in Venezuela and Panama: C. bayano and C. chapmani.
