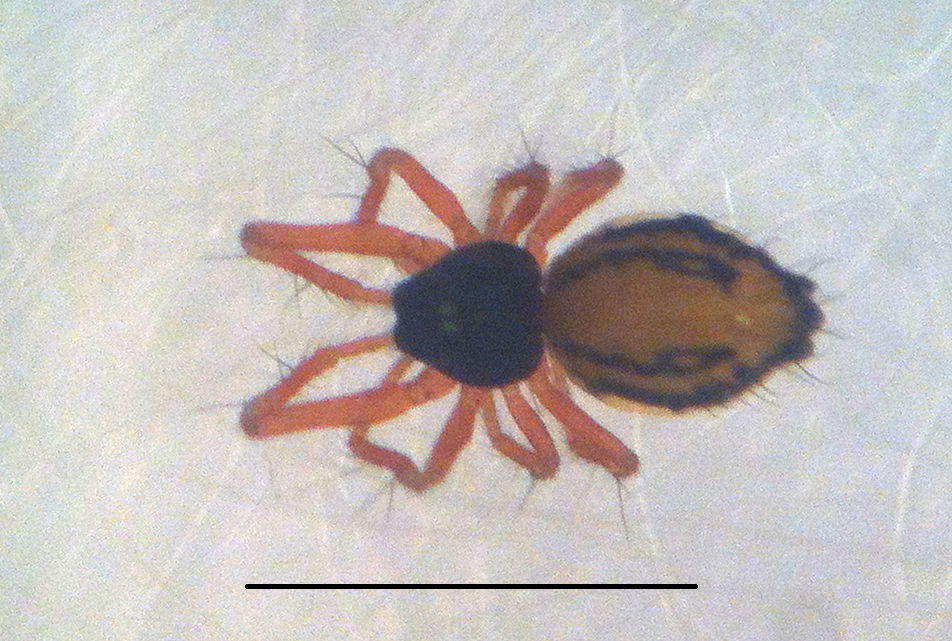
- C. danaugirangensis female

Scientific classification
- Kingdom: Animalia
- Phylum: Arthropoda
- Subphylum: Chelicerata
- Class: Arachnida
- Order: Araneae
- Infraorder: Araneomorphae
- Family: Symphytognathidae
- Genus: Crassignatha; Wunderlich, 1995

Type species
- C. haeneli Wunderlich, 1995

Species
- 28, see text

= Crassignatha =

Genus of spiders

Crassignatha is a genus of Asian dwarf orb-weavers that was first described by J. Wunderlich in 1995.

== Species ==
As of August 2021 it contains twenty-eight species, found in Asia:

- Crassignatha baihua Lin & S. Q. Li, 2020 – China
- Crassignatha bangbie Lin & S. Q. Li, 2020 – China
- Crassignatha bicorniventris (Lin & Li, 2009) – China
- Crassignatha changyan Lin & S. Q. Li, 2020 – China
- Crassignatha danaugirangensis Miller et al., 2014 – Borneo
- Crassignatha dongnai Lin & S. Q. Li, 2020 – Vietnam
- Crassignatha ertou Miller, Griswold & Yin, 2009 – China
- Crassignatha gucheng Lin & S. Q. Li, 2020 – China
- Crassignatha gudu Miller, Griswold & Yin, 2009 – China
- Crassignatha haeneli Wunderlich, 1995 (type) – Malaysia
- Crassignatha hekou Wu & Lin, 2026
- Crassignatha liangdu Wu & Lin, 2026
- Crassignatha longtou Miller, Griswold & Yin, 2009 – China
- Crassignatha mengla Lin & S. Q. Li, 2020 – China
- Crassignatha nantou Lin & S. Q. Li, 2020 – Taiwan
- Crassignatha nasalis Lin & S. Q. Li, 2020 – China
- Crassignatha panlong Wu & Lin, 2026
- Crassignatha pianma Miller, Griswold & Yin, 2009 – China
- Crassignatha qingxu Wu & Lin, 2026
- Crassignatha quadriventris Lin & Li, 2009 – China
- Crassignatha quanqu Miller, Griswold & Yin, 2009 – China
- Crassignatha rostriformis Lin & S. Q. Li, 2020 – China
- Crassignatha seedam Rivera-Quiroz, Petcharad & Miller, 2021 – Thailand
- Crassignatha seeliam Rivera-Quiroz, Petcharad & Miller, 2021 – Thailand
- Crassignatha shiluensis Lin & Li, 2009 – China, Laos, Thailand
- Crassignatha shunani Lin & S. Q. Li, 2020 – China
- Crassignatha si Lin & S. Q. Li, 2020 – China
- Crassignatha spinathoraxi Lin & S. Q. Li, 2020 – China
- Crassignatha thampra Lin & S. Q. Li, 2020 – Thailand
- Crassignatha xichou Lin & S. Q. Li, 2020 – China
- Crassignatha yamu Miller, Griswold & Yin, 2009 – China
- Crassignatha yinzhi Miller, Griswold & Yin, 2009 – China
