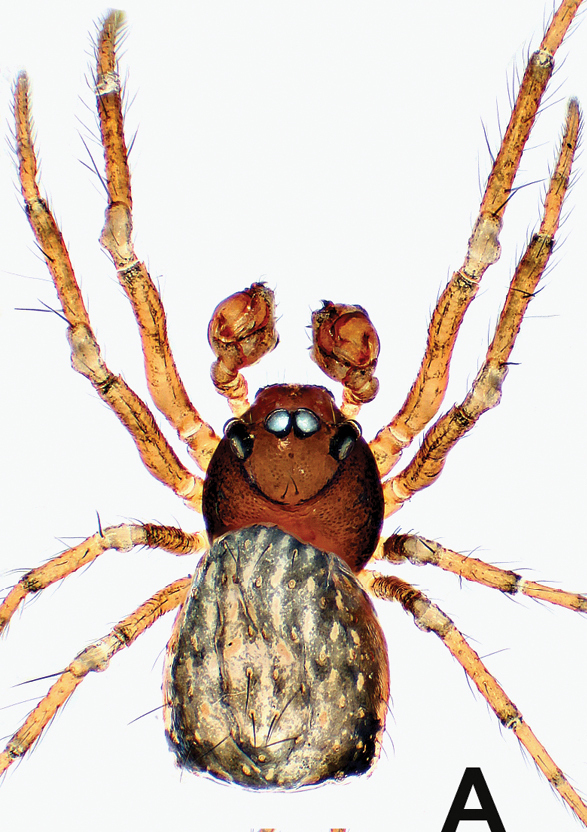
- male Crassignatha quadriventris
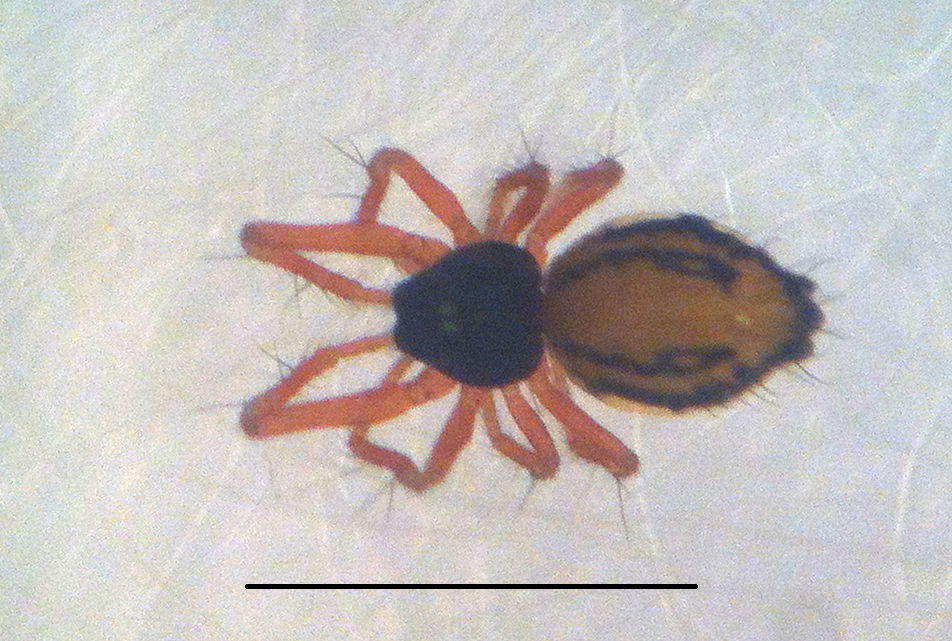
- female Crassignatha danaugirangensis

Scientific classification
- Kingdom: Animalia
- Phylum: Arthropoda
- Subphylum: Chelicerata
- Class: Arachnida
- Order: Araneae
- Infraorder: Araneomorphae
- Family: Symphytognathidae; Hickman, 1931

Diversity
- 10 genera, 105 species
- blue: reported countries (WSC)

= Symphytognathidae =

Dwarf orb-weavers

Family of spiders

Symphytognathidae is a family of spiders with 90 described species in eight genera. Most species inhabit the New World tropics and Oceania.

The species Patu digua is considered to be one of the smallest spiders in the world with a body size of 0.37 millimetres (0.015 in).

== Distribution ==
Spiders in this family occur in the tropics of Central and South America and the Australian region (with Oceania).

Exceptions include some Anapistula species, with A. benoiti and A. caecula found in Africa, A. ishikawai found in Japan, and A. jerai found in Southeast Asia. Symphytognatha imbulunga is also found in Africa.

== Morphology ==
Symphytognathidae are four, six or eight-eyed spiders and are generally small in size. The opisthosoma is covered in long hairs.

== Genera ==
As of October 2025, this family includes ten genera and 105 species:

- Anapistula Gertsch, 1941 – Africa, Asia, Portugal, Spain, Mexico to South America, Australia, Tonga
- Anapogonia Simon, 1905 – Indonesia
- Crassignatha Wunderlich, 1995 – Asia
- Curimagua Forster & Platnick, 1977 – Panama, Venezuela
- Globignatha Balogh & Loksa, 1968 – Belize, Brazil
- Iardinis Simon, 1899 – India, Nepal
- Kirinua S. Q. Li & Lin, 2021 – China
- Patu Marples, 1951 – Asia, Oceania, Colombia
- Swilda S. Q. Li & Lin, 2021 – China
- Symphytognatha Hickman, 1931 – South Africa, China, Mexico to Brazil, Australia, New Guinea
