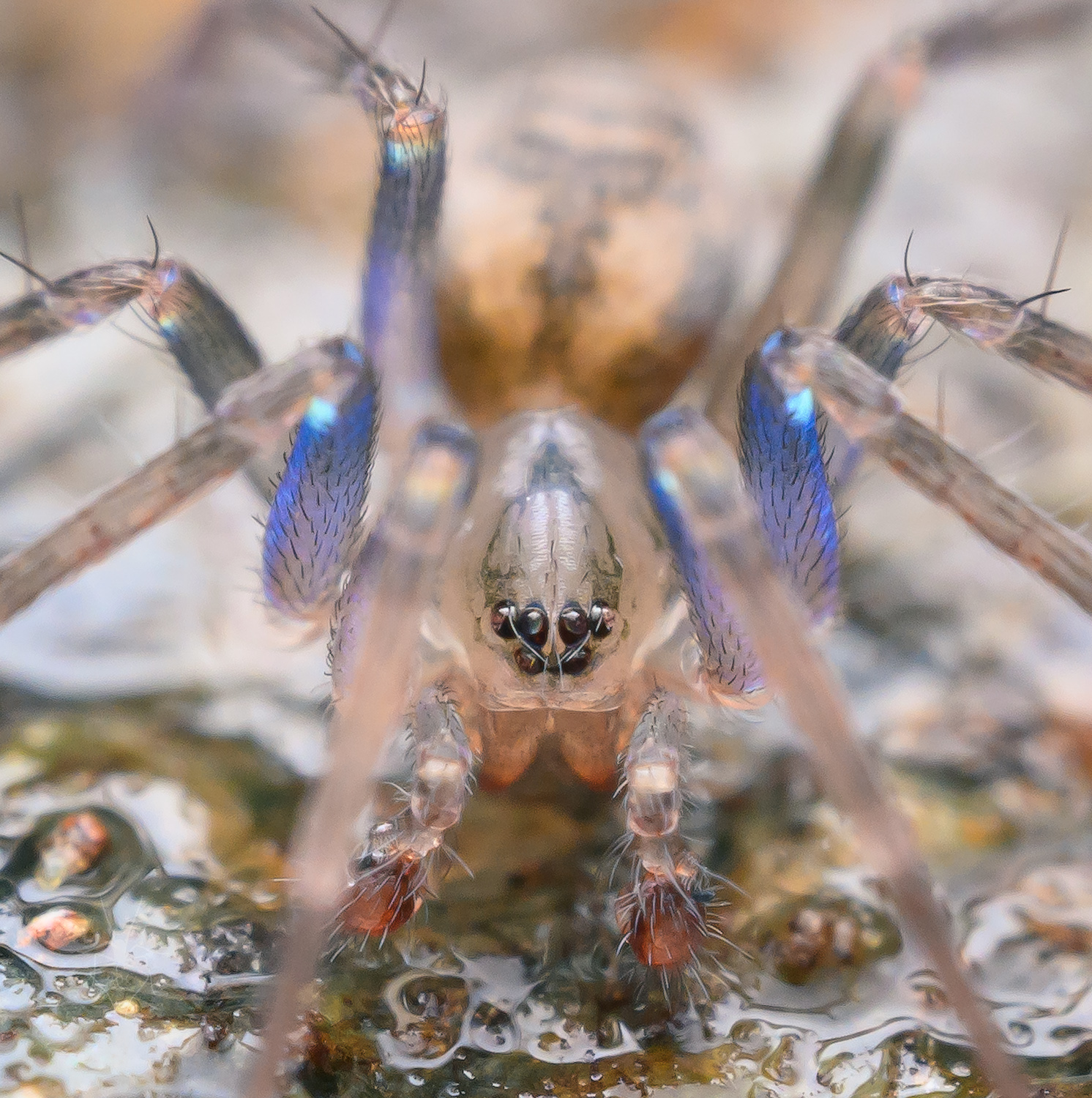
- male C. furtiva

Scientific classification
- Kingdom: Animalia
- Phylum: Arthropoda
- Subphylum: Chelicerata
- Class: Arachnida
- Order: Araneae
- Infraorder: Araneomorphae
- Family: Cybaeidae
- Genus: Cybaeozyga
- Species: C. furtiva

Binomial name
- Cybaeozyga furtiva Hedin, Ramírez & Monjaraz-Ruedas, 2025

= Cybaeozyga furtiva =

Species of spider

Cybaeozyga furtiva is a species of North American araneomorph spider in the family Cybaeidae. It was described in 2025 by Marshal Hedin, Martín J. Ramírez, and Rodrigo Monjaraz-Ruedas.

== Etymology ==
The specific name furtiva is derived from the Latin word meaning "hidden" or "concealed", referring to the rarity and microhabitat preference of this species.

== Description ==
The female holotype has a total body length of 3.53 mm, with a carapace length of 1.40 mm and width of 1.05 mm. In alcohol, the coloration is greenish brown with a dark gray dorsal pattern. The carapace displays dark markings extending from the eyes to the cephalic area, while the abdomen is grayish with dark patterns dorsally, laterally, and around the spinnerets. The legs are darker at the distal femora, basal tibiae, and basal metatarsi. A distinctive feature is that the anterior median eyes are missing, represented only by small dark blotches of black pigment.

The species can be distinguished from Cybaeozyga heterops by its epigynum, which possesses a slightly more sclerotized and rugose epigynal plate anterior to the epigastric furrow, with white glandular material lying anterior to the spermathecae, and longer spermathecae that nearly meet at the midline.

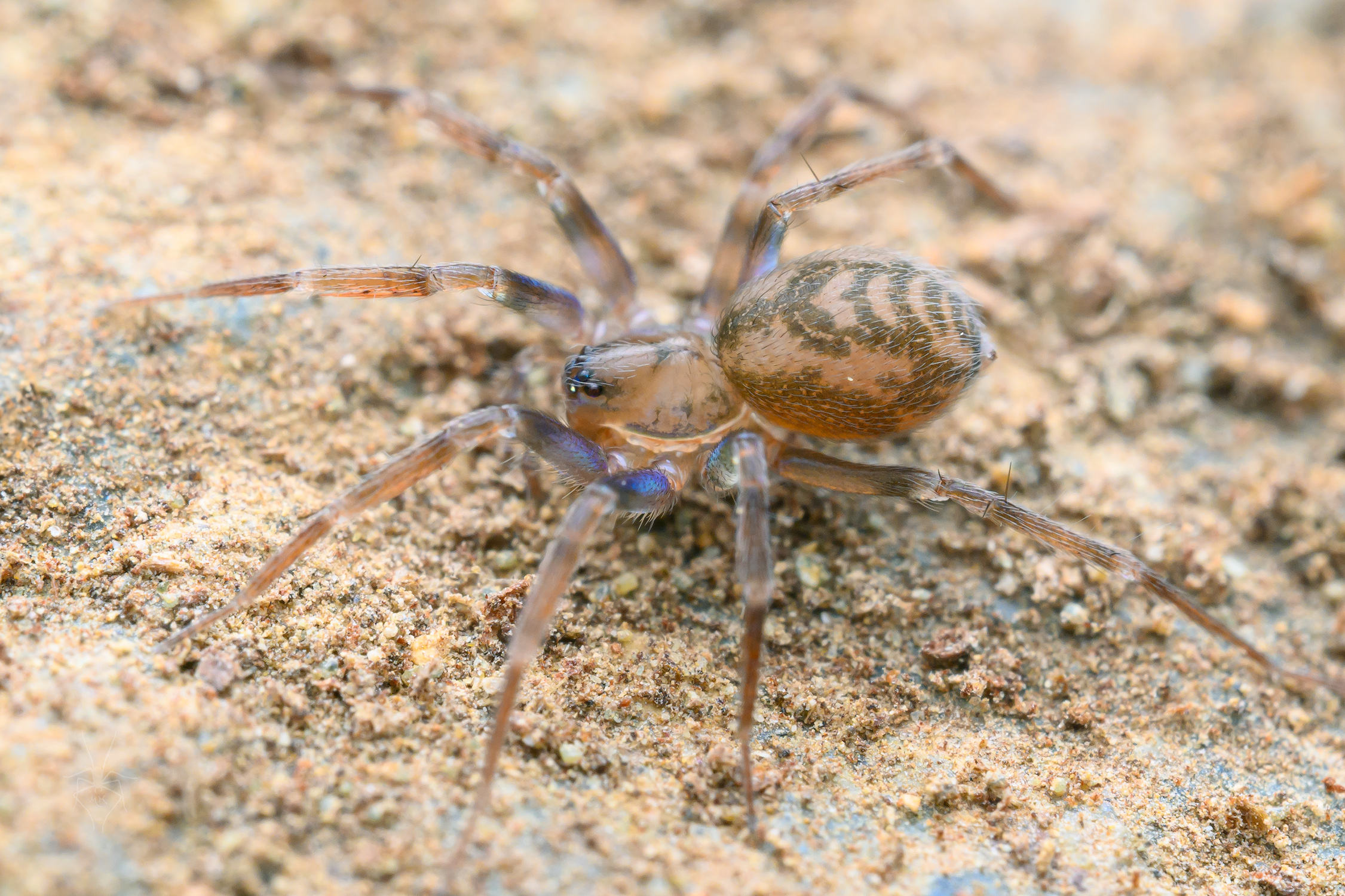
female

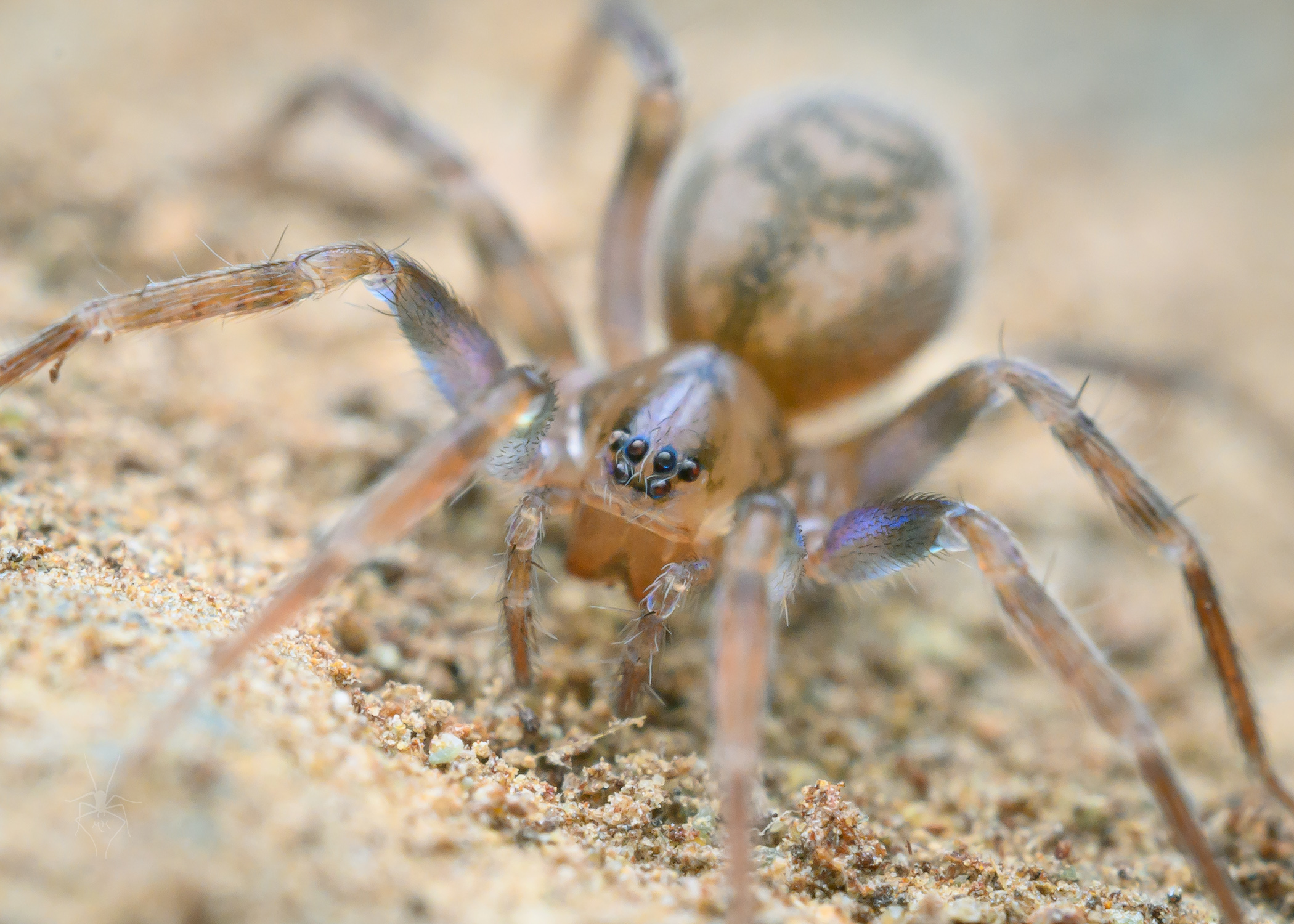
female

== Distribution and habitat ==
Cybaeozyga furtiva is known from Del Norte County and Humboldt County in California, at lower elevations of 120–150 meters. The holotype was collected east of Crescent City in wet mixed forest with redwood.

The species inhabits wet mixed conifer forests, where specimens are found under rock piles, logs, and in leaf litter. Males were found after publication of the 2025 description.

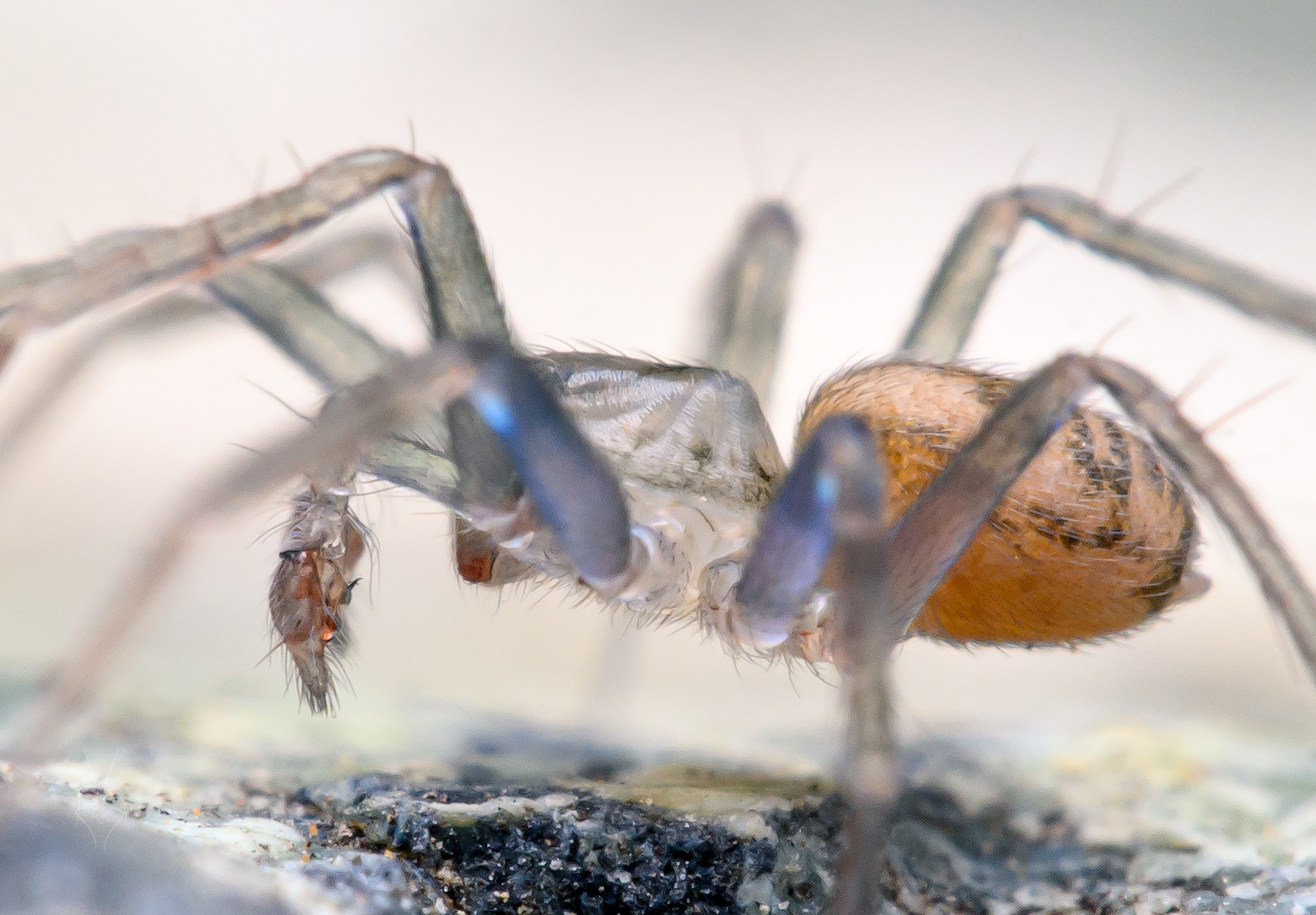
male

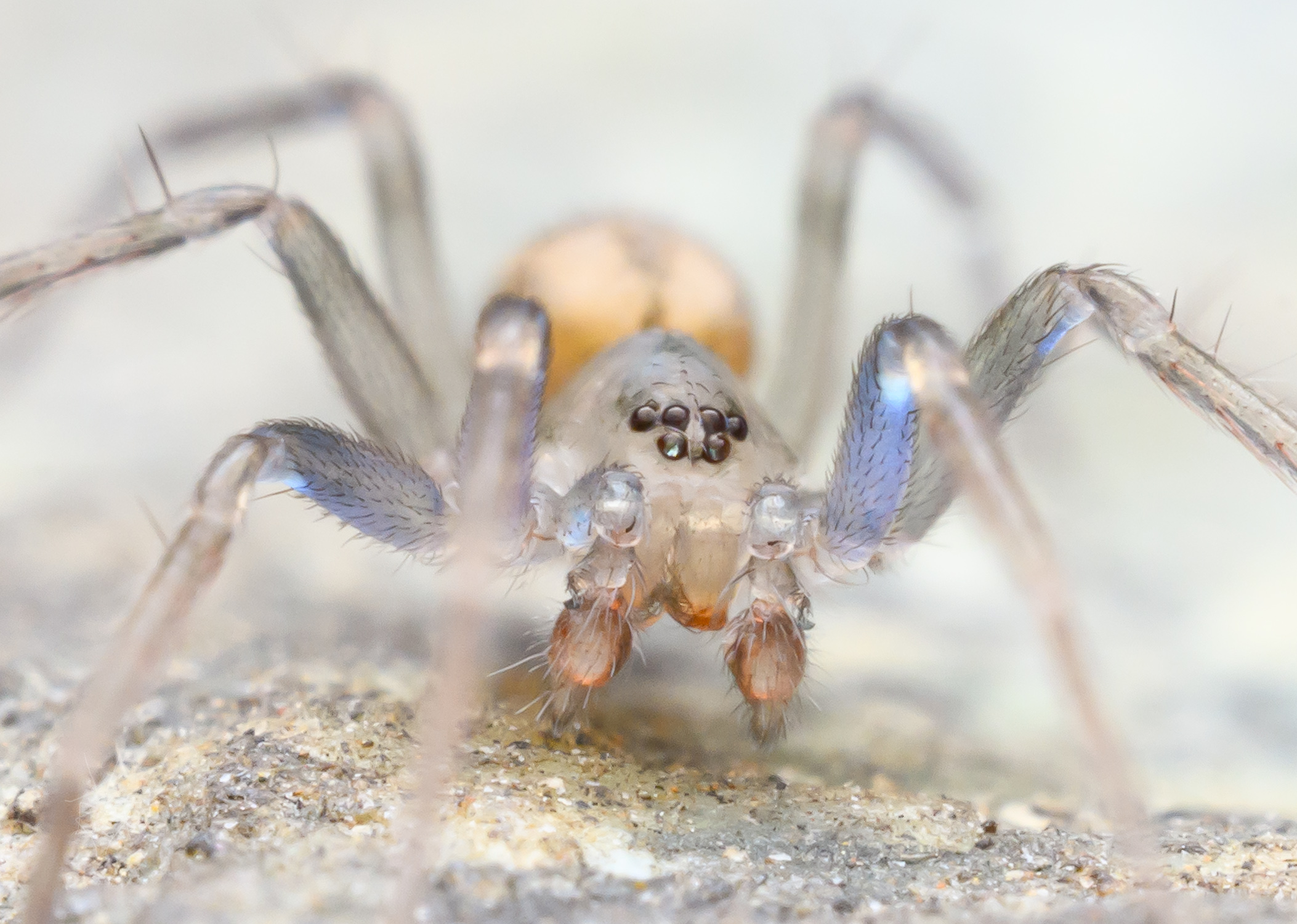
male
