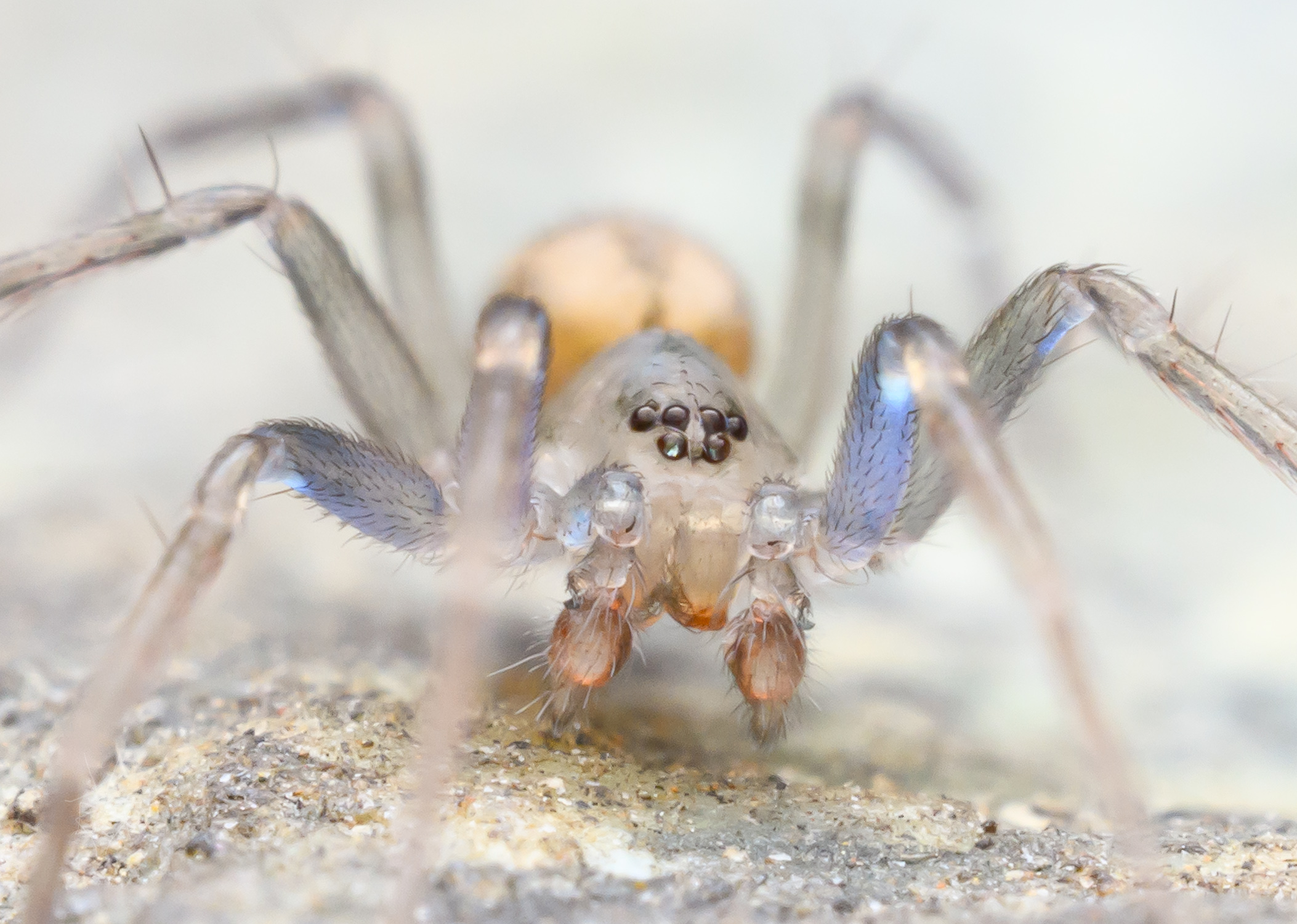
- male C. furtiva

Scientific classification
- Kingdom: Animalia
- Phylum: Arthropoda
- Subphylum: Chelicerata
- Class: Arachnida
- Order: Araneae
- Infraorder: Araneomorphae
- Family: Cybaeidae
- Genus: Cybaeozyga; Chamberlin & Ivie, 1937

= Cybaeozyga =

Genus of spiders

Cybaeozyga is a genus of North American araneomorph spiders in the family Cybaeidae containing two described species. It was first described by R. V. Chamberlin & Wilton Ivie in 1937, and was moved to Cybaeidae in 1967. It has only been found in the western United States.

== Species ==
The genus contains two described species:

- Cybaeozyga furtiva Hedin, Ramírez & Monjaraz-Ruedas, 2025
- Cybaeozyga heterops Chamberlin & Ivie, 1937

Additional known but still undescribed species of Cybaeozyga have been mentioned in the literature. The distribution of Cybaeozyga appears to include forests and caves of the Klamath Mountains ecoregion of northwestern California and southwestern Oregon.
