= Cybaeozyga heterops =

Scientific classification
- Kingdom: Animalia
- Phylum: Arthropoda
- Subphylum: Chelicerata
- Class: Arachnida
- Order: Araneae
- Infraorder: Araneomorphae
- Family: Cybaeidae
- Genus: Cybaeozyga
- Species: C. heterops

Binomial name
- Cybaeozyga heterops Chamberlin & Ivie, 1937

Species of spider

Cybaeozyga heterops is a species of North American araneomorph spider in the family Cybaeidae. It was first described by R. V. Chamberlin & Wilton Ivie in 1937 as the type species of the genus Cybaeozyga.

== Description ==
The male has a total body length of 2.70 mm, with a carapace length of 1.20 mm and width of 0.95 mm. The cephalothorax and appendages are light yellowish brown, with the carapace displaying dusky markings on the side margins and on the top and sides of the head region. The sternum has indistinct dusky markings, and the legs are lightly annulated. The abdomen is dark gray above with light marks typical of the genus Cybaeus, while the underside is pale with two dark longitudinal streaks.

== Distribution and habitat ==
Cybaeozyga heterops is known from the Klamath Mountains region. The holotype was collected at Grave Creek, Oregon, near Klamath Falls, by R. V. Chamberlin and W. Ivie on September 9, 1935. The species appears to inhabit forests and caves within the Klamath Mountains ecoregion of northwestern California and southwestern Oregon.
