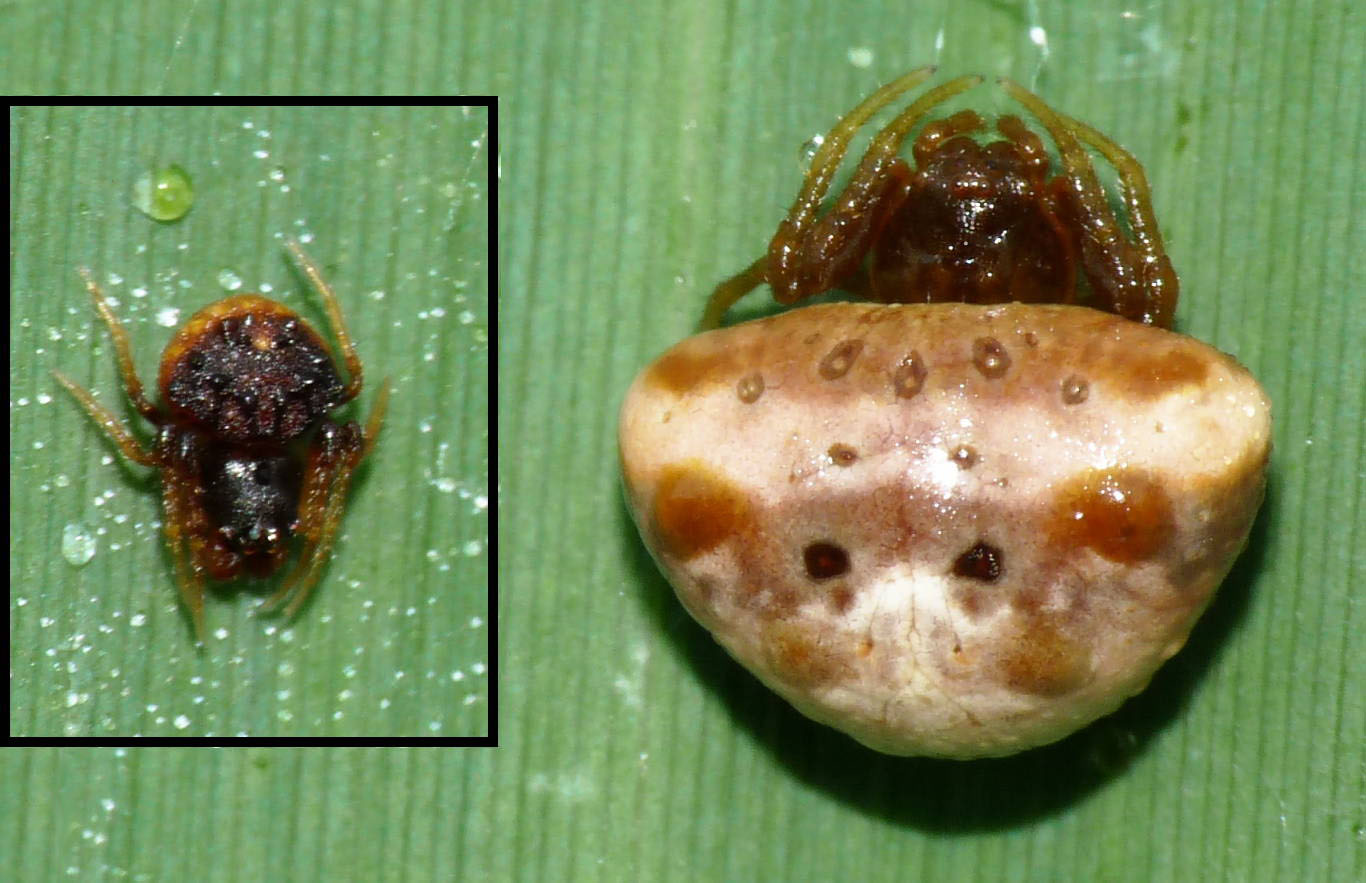
- Male and female Cyrtarachne ixoides

Scientific classification
- Kingdom: Animalia
- Phylum: Arthropoda
- Subphylum: Chelicerata
- Class: Arachnida
- Order: Araneae
- Infraorder: Araneomorphae
- Family: Araneidae
- Subfamily: Cyrtarachninae s.l. Simon, 1892

Tribes and genera
- See text.

= Cyrtarachninae =

Subfamily of spiders

Cyrtarachninae is a subfamily of spiders in the family Araneidae (orb-weaver spiders, araneids). The group has been circumscribed in several different ways. It originated as the group Cyrtarachneae, described by Eugène Simon in 1892. The group was later treated at different ranks: as a tribe, both under Simon's name and as Cyrtarachnini, and as the subfamily Cyrtarachninae. Circumscriptions have varied. The broadest circumscription, Cyrtarachninae sensu lato (s.l.), includes three of Simon's original groups, including the bolas spiders (also placed in the tribe Mastophoreae or Mastophorini, or in the subfamily Mastophorinae). Unlike most araneids, members of the subfamily do not construct orb webs, some not using webs at all to capture prey, some using one or more sticky drops on a single line (a bolas), while others construct webs with few widely spaced non-spiral threads, some triangular. Many have been shown to attract prey by producing analogues of insect sex pheromones, particularly to attract male moths. Adult females may mimic snails, bird droppings and other objects, and so are able to remain exposed during the day time, capturing prey at night.

== Description ==
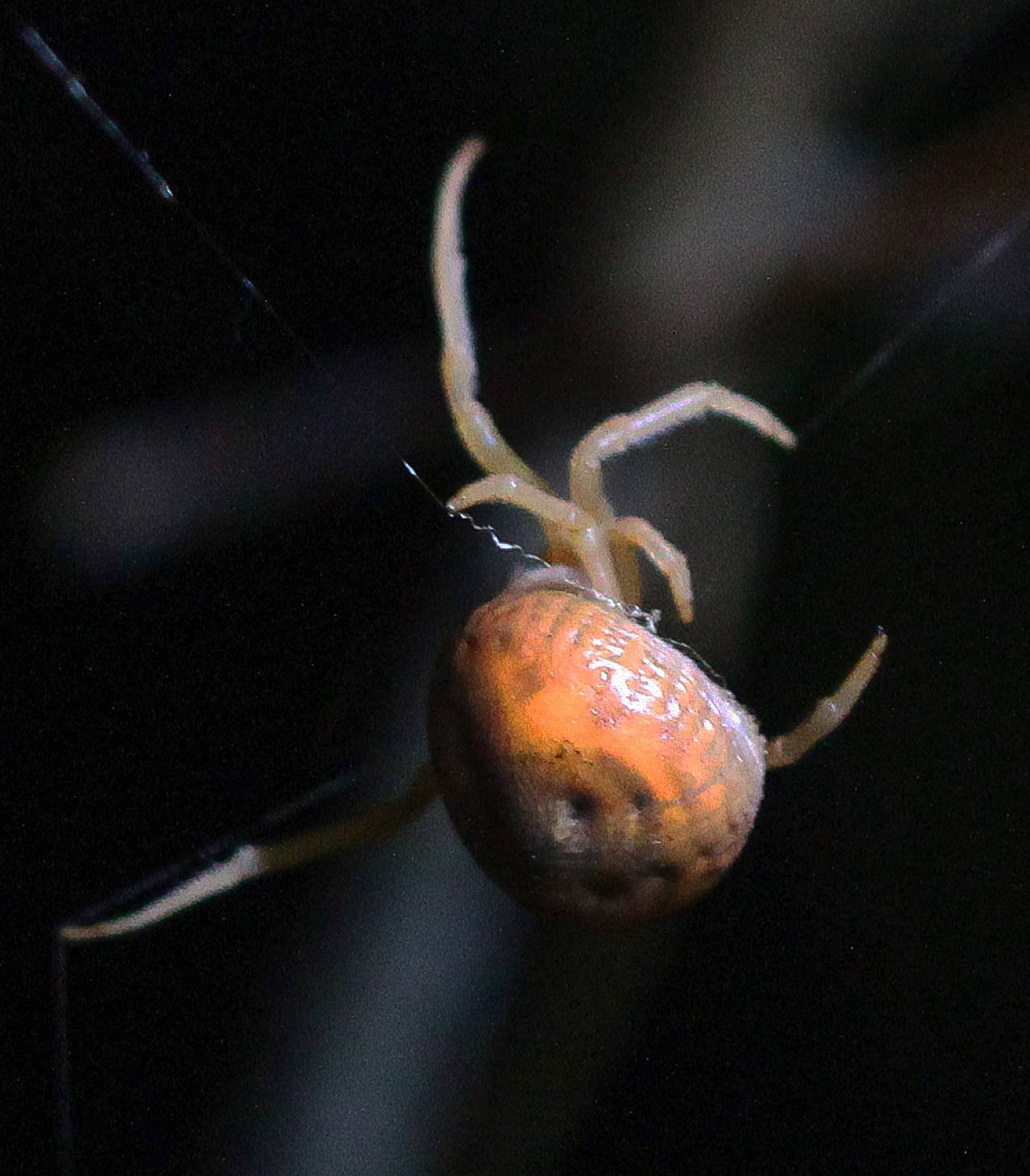
Mastophora bisaccata resembles a snail

The abdomen of adult females in many species of Cyrtarachninae s.l. is large relative to the cephalothorax, and partially covers it. Males are often very substantially smaller than females, particularly among bolas spiders. Many species resemble other objects, and are presumed to derive some protection from this resemblance. Some species of Mastophora, such as Mastophora extraordinaria, resemble bird droppings. At rest, Mastophora bisaccata clings to the underside of leaves with its legs drawn in, and then looks like a snail. Cyrtarachne conica also resembles a snail. A unifying characteristic of Cyrtarachninae s.l. is a tendency towards reduction of the web from that of more typical members of the Araneidae. The ability to produce mimics of the sex pheromones of their prey, particularly those of female moths, seems to have evolved in parallel to web reduction.

== Taxonomy ==
In 1892, Eugène Simon created the group Cyrtarachneae, including five genera: Paraplectana, Aranoethra, Pasilobus, Cyrtarachne and Poecilopachys. In the same work, he also created the group Glyptocranieae, including the genera Agatostichus (now included in Mastophora), Glyptocranium, Cladomelea and Dicrostichus (now Ordgarius). Glyptocranium is now accepted as a junior synonym of Mastophora, and in 1931, Cândido Mello-Leitão established the alternative name Mastophoreae for the group. Simon placed two genera, Celaenia and Taczanowskia, in the group Celaenieae. These three groups, Cyrtarachneae, Mastophoreae and Celaenieae, were treated as tribes, sometimes under the formal names Cyrtarachnini, Mastophorini and Celaeniini. Emerit in 1978 treated the first two groups as the subfamilies Cyrtarachninae and Mastophorinae (his work did not include genera Simon placed in Celaenieae).

Eberhard in a study of the attack behaviour of araneids in 1980 and in a study of bolas spiders in 1982 showed that Simon's three groups shared similar characteristics and suggested that they should be placed together. In 1997, Scharff and Coddington published a phylogenetic analysis of the family Araneidae. They included genera from two of Simon's groups, Cyrtarachneae and Mastophoreae, and supported earlier authors in showing that Cyrtarachneae and Mastophoreae were monophyletic and were sisters. They proposed to recognize this relationship by combining them into the subfamily Cyrtarachninae, noting that "The biology of Cyrtarachninae is fairly coherent. There is a strong tendency towards web reduction, compensated, apparently, by the evolution of aggressive chemical mimicry". They did not include any genera from Simon's Celaenieae. Tanikawa et al. in 2014 included all three of Simon's groups in their broad circumscription of Cyrtarachninae, showing that the resulting taxon was divided into two clades. A wider study of the family Araneidae published in 2020 followed Tanikawa et al. in separating Cyrtarachninae s.l. into two informal sister groups, which they called "mastophorines" and "cyrtarachines". Mastophorines included the genus Caelinia from Simon's Celaenieae.

These alternative treatments are summarized in the following table.

Some alternative treatments
Simon (1892) groups	Formal tribe names	Emerit (1978)	Scharff & Coddington (1997)	Tanikawa et al. (2014)	Scharff et al. (2020)
Celaenieae	Celaeniini	–	–	Cyrtarachninae	mastophorines
Mastophoreae (Glyptocranieae)	Mastophorini	Mastophorinae	Cyrtarachninae	Cyrtarachninae	mastophorines
Cyrtarachneae	Cyrtarachnini	Cyrtarachninae	Cyrtarachninae	Cyrtarachninae	cyrtarachnines

=== Genera ===
Genera which have been placed in a broad circumscription of Cyrtarachninae (mostly based on phylogenetic studies) include the following. The division into two groups follows Scharff et al. (2020). The mastophorines include Simon's Celaenieae plus Glyptocranieae (= Mastophorae), the cyrtarachnines his Cyrtarachneae. (Authorities and distributions below are from the World Spider Catalog.)

- mastophorines
  - webless
    - Celaenia Thorell, 1868 – Australia and New Zealand
    - Taczanowskia Keyserling, 1879 – South America and Mexico
  - bolas
    - Cladomelea Simon, 1895 – Central and South Africa
    - Exechocentrus Simon, 1889 – Madagascar
    - Mastophora Holmberg, 1876 – North and South America
    - Ordgarius Keyserling, 1886 – India to Japan, south to Australia
  - unknown
    - [?] Acantharachne Tullgren, 1910 – Cameroon, Democratic Republic of the Congo, Tanznania, Madagascar
- cyrtarachnines
  - spanning-thread web
    - Aranoethra Butler, 1873 – West and Central Africa
    - Cyrtarachne Thorell, 1868 – Mediterranean Basin and Africa to Japan and Australia
    - Paraplectana Brito Capello, 1867 – Africa to Taiwan
    - Poecilopachys Simon, 1895 – Australia and the Pacific
  - triangular web
    - Pasilobus Simon, 1895 – Africa to Japan and the Solomon Islands
Example species

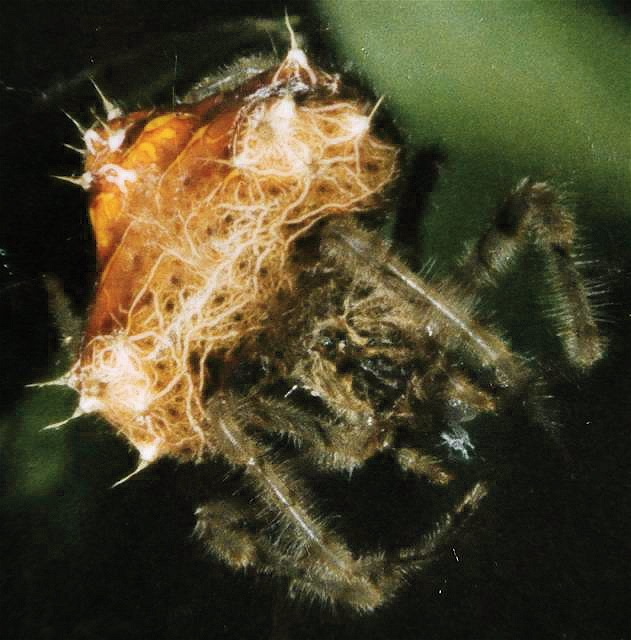
Cladomelea debeeri

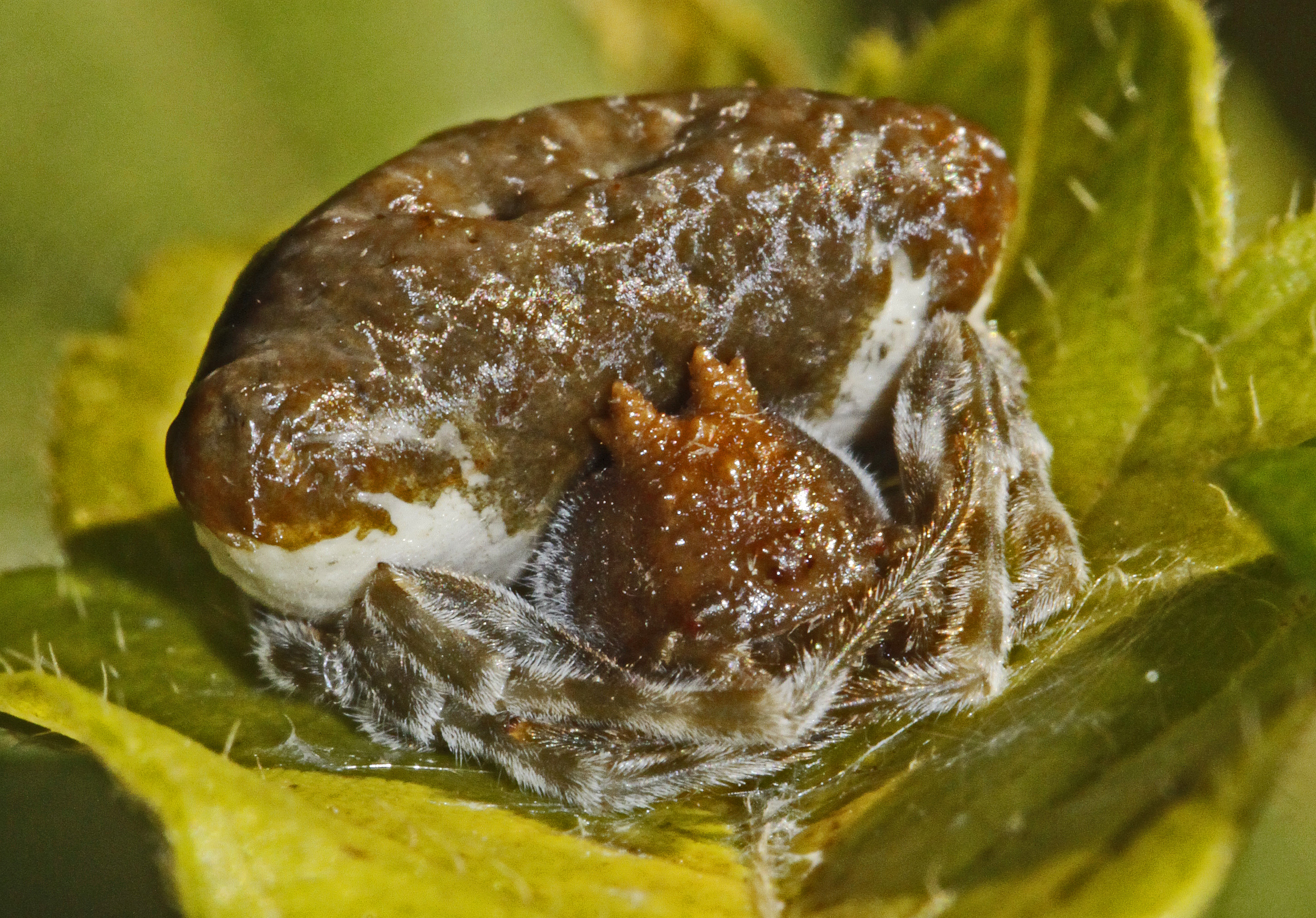
Mastophora phrynosoma

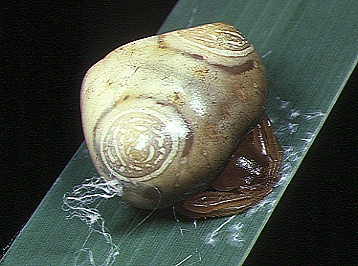
Cyrtarachne inaequalis

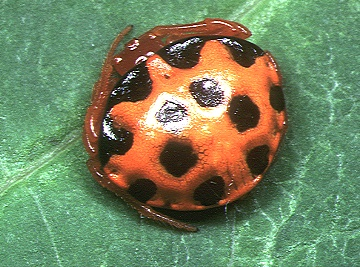
Paraplectana tsushimensis

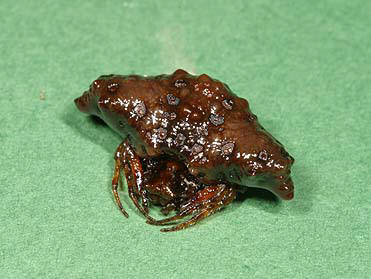
Pasilobus hupingensis

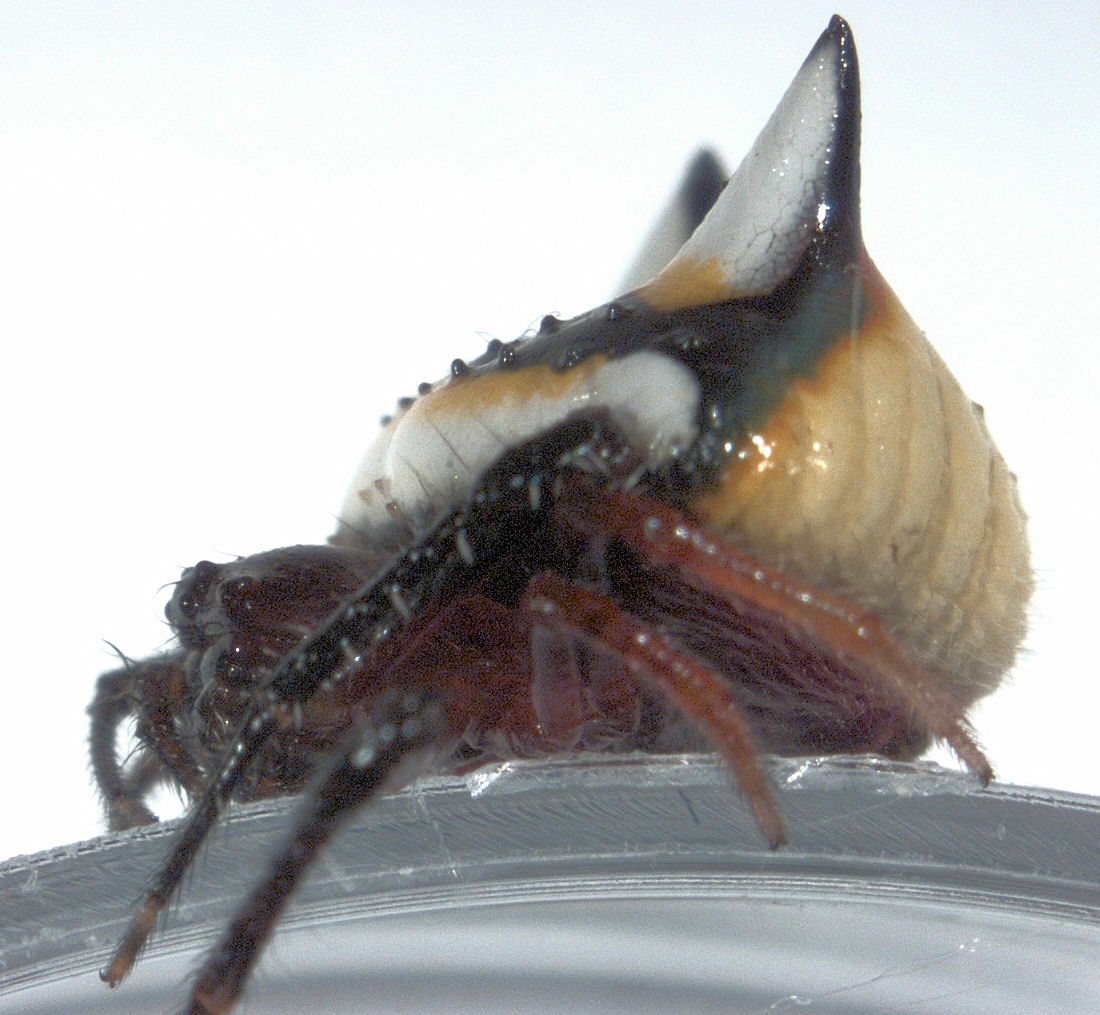
Poecilopachys australasia

== Webs ==
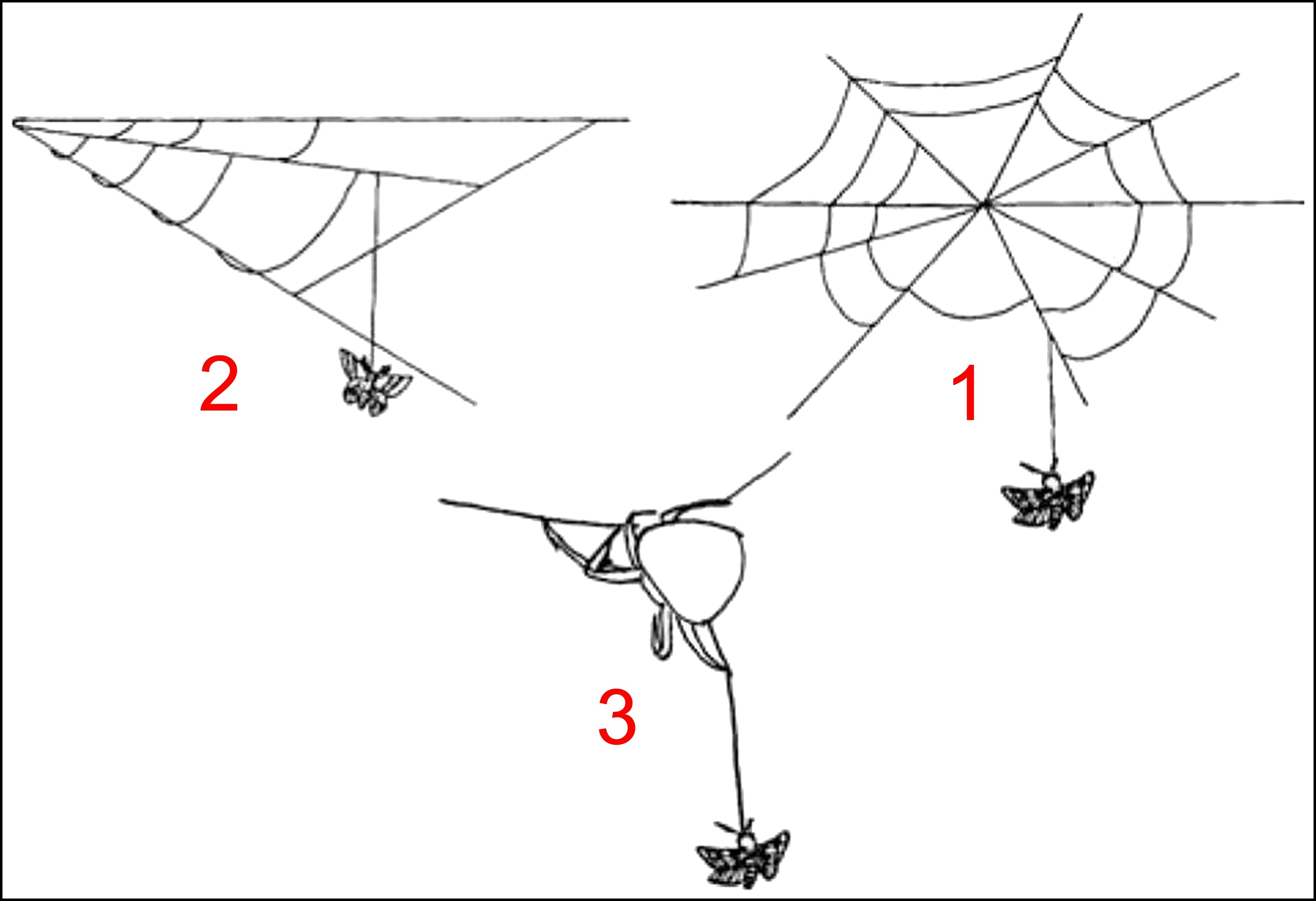
Prey capture devices: 1 = circular spanning-thread web, 2 = triangular spanning-thread web; 3 = bolas

Cyrtarachninae s.l. contains species which construct several kinds of web, differing from the orb webs of other araneids. Some construct circular "spanning-thread webs", which have a small number of radii and widely spaced sticky threads that do not form spirals. Others construct triangular spanning-thread webs. These are formed in the same way as full spanning-thread webs, but have only three radii so that they appear triangular. The spanning threads in both circular and triangular spanning-thread webs are attached in such a way that when they catch a prey item (usually a moth), the thread detaches at one end and the prey ends up dangling until hauled up by the spider. Bolas spiders do not spin webs at all, adult females catching their prey at night on apparently single threads with one or more sticky balls which they swing towards their prey. Finally, some species, as well as male and juvenile female bolas spiders, capture their prey without a web, using their outstretched legs.

One hypothesis was that the evolution of the web types involved successive reduction: spanning-thread webs → triangular webs → bolas → no web. However, the 2014 molecular phylogenetic study by Tanikawa et al. showed that this hypothesis did not fit with the evolutionary relationships they derived, relationships which were confirmed by Scharff et al. in 2020. The cladogram below, based on Tanikawa et al. (2020), shows the apparent relationships among groups capturing prey in different ways. Triangular webs are shown to have evolved from within the group that uses spanning-thread webs. However, completely webless species and those using bolas form a separate monophyletic group.

- Cyrtarachninae s.l.
  - mastophorines
    - webless spiders
    - bolas spiders
  - cyrtarachnines
    - spanning-thread web spiders (paraphyletic)
    - triangular web spiders
