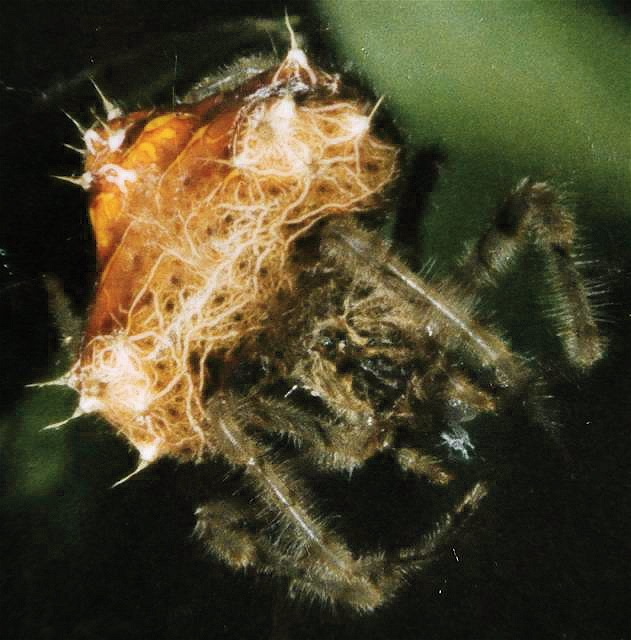

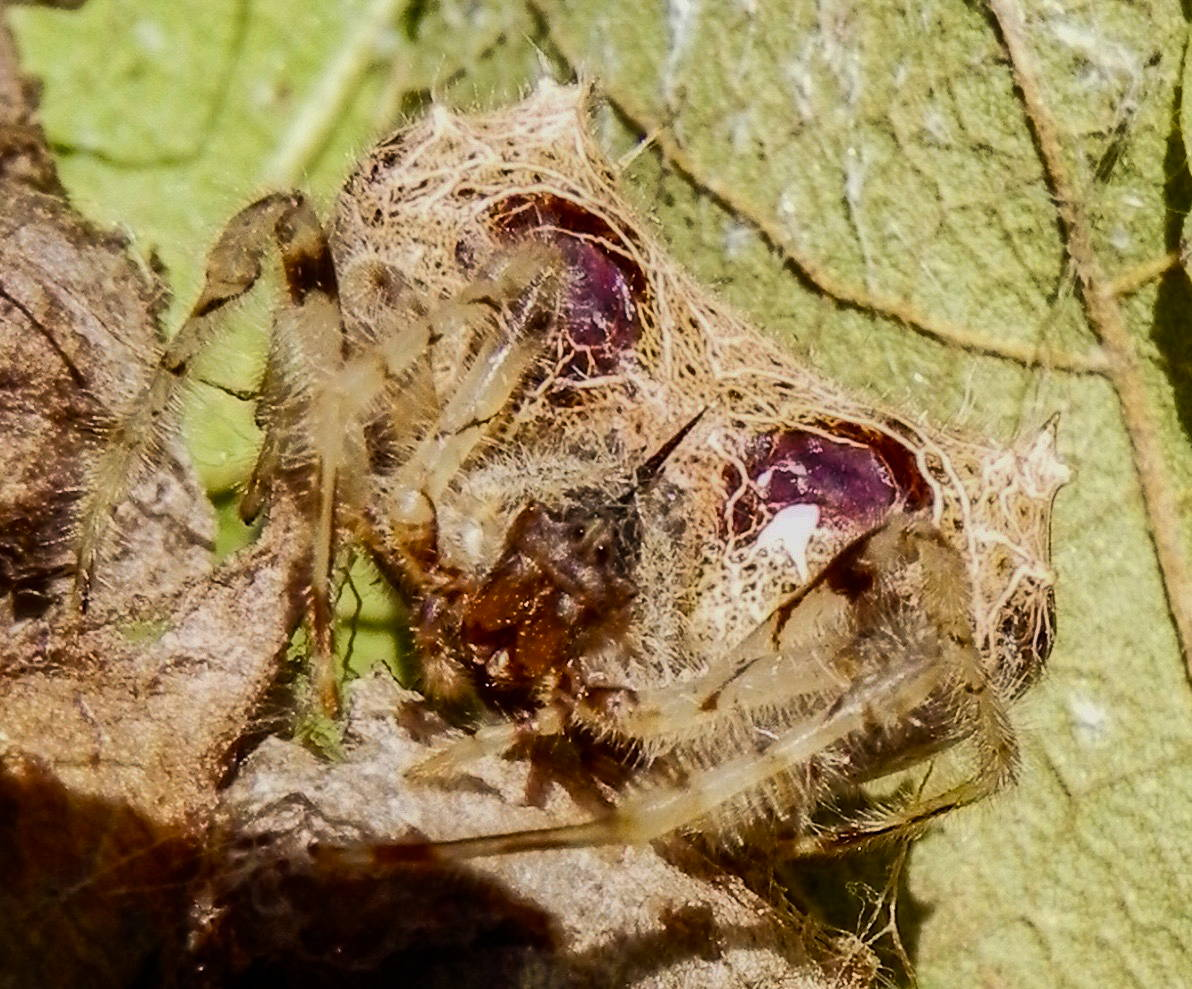
- Showing longer middle tubercule on the head

Scientific classification
- Kingdom: Animalia
- Phylum: Arthropoda
- Subphylum: Chelicerata
- Class: Arachnida
- Order: Araneae
- Infraorder: Araneomorphae
- Family: Araneidae
- Genus: Cladomelea
- Species: C. debeeri

Binomial name
- Cladomelea debeeri Roff & Dippenaar-Schoeman, 2004

= Cladomelea debeeri =

Debeer's Bolas Spider

Species of spider

Cladomelea debeeri is a species of spider in the orb-weaver spider family Araneidae, found in South Africa. It was first described in 2004. Cladomelea species, including C. debeeri, are "bolas spiders" – adult females capture their prey by using one or more sticky drops on the end of a line which they swing, usually catching male moths attracted by the release of an analogue of the attractant sex pheromone produced by the female moth. Juvenile and adult male bolas spiders do not use a bolas, catching prey with their legs alone.

== Distribution ==
Cladomelea debeeri is endemic to KwaZulu-Natal, South Africa. The species is known from two localities at elevations ranging from 722 to 1,150 m above sea level.

== Bolas construction and use ==
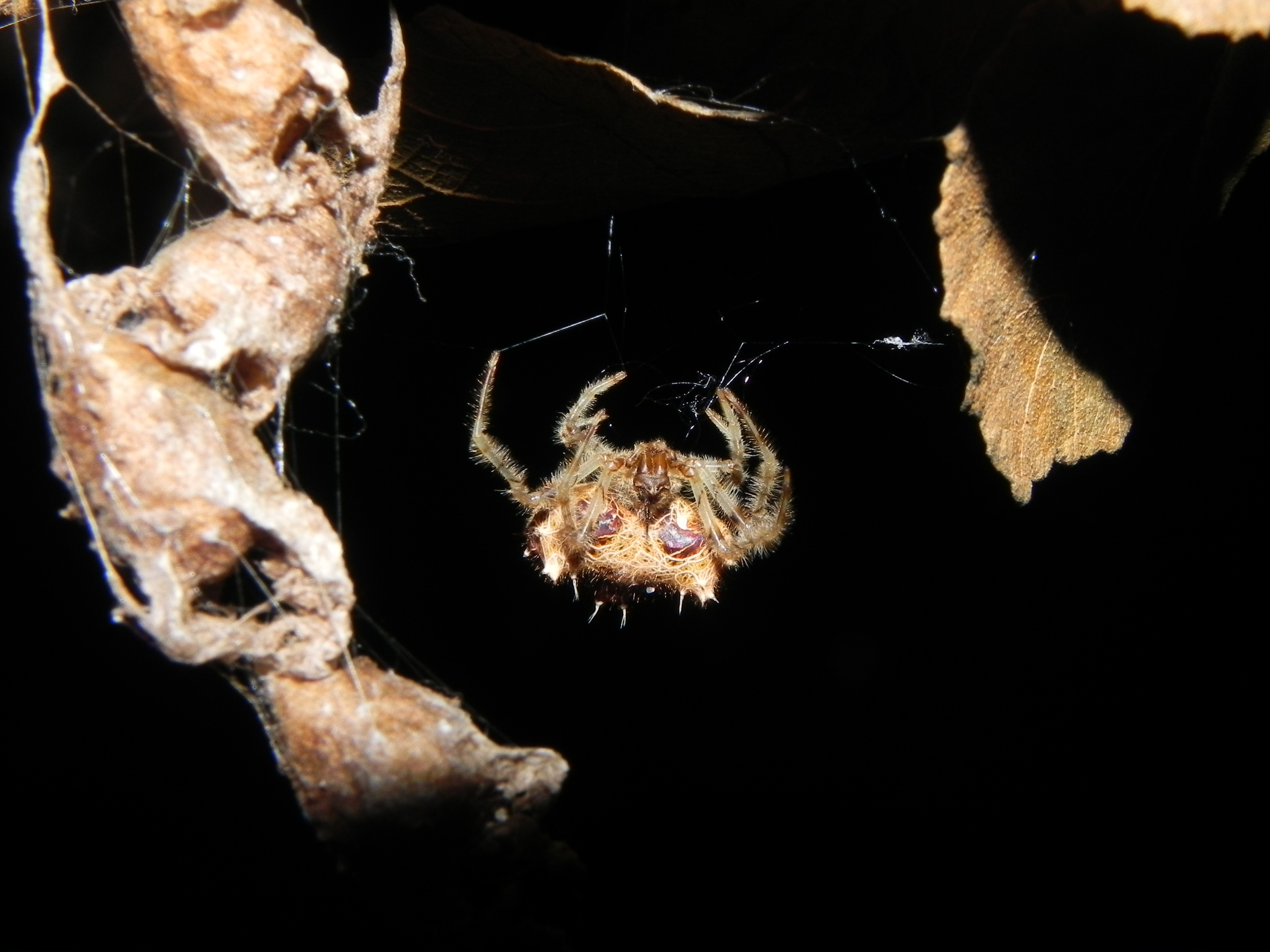
C. debeeri at night

A female was observed over four successive nights. It constructed its bolas in early evening. This was made up of two or three increasingly shorter silk threads each ending in a sticky droplet about 2–3 mm in diameter. When the threads were put together, the result was one compound thread with two or three droplets. (This differs from the bolas of the other South African bolas spider, C. akermani, which uses only a single thread with one or two droplets.) The bolas was whirled with the second pair of legs. A new bolas was constructed every 2–3 hours. The spider was observed to catch a moth only on the first night.

== Description ==
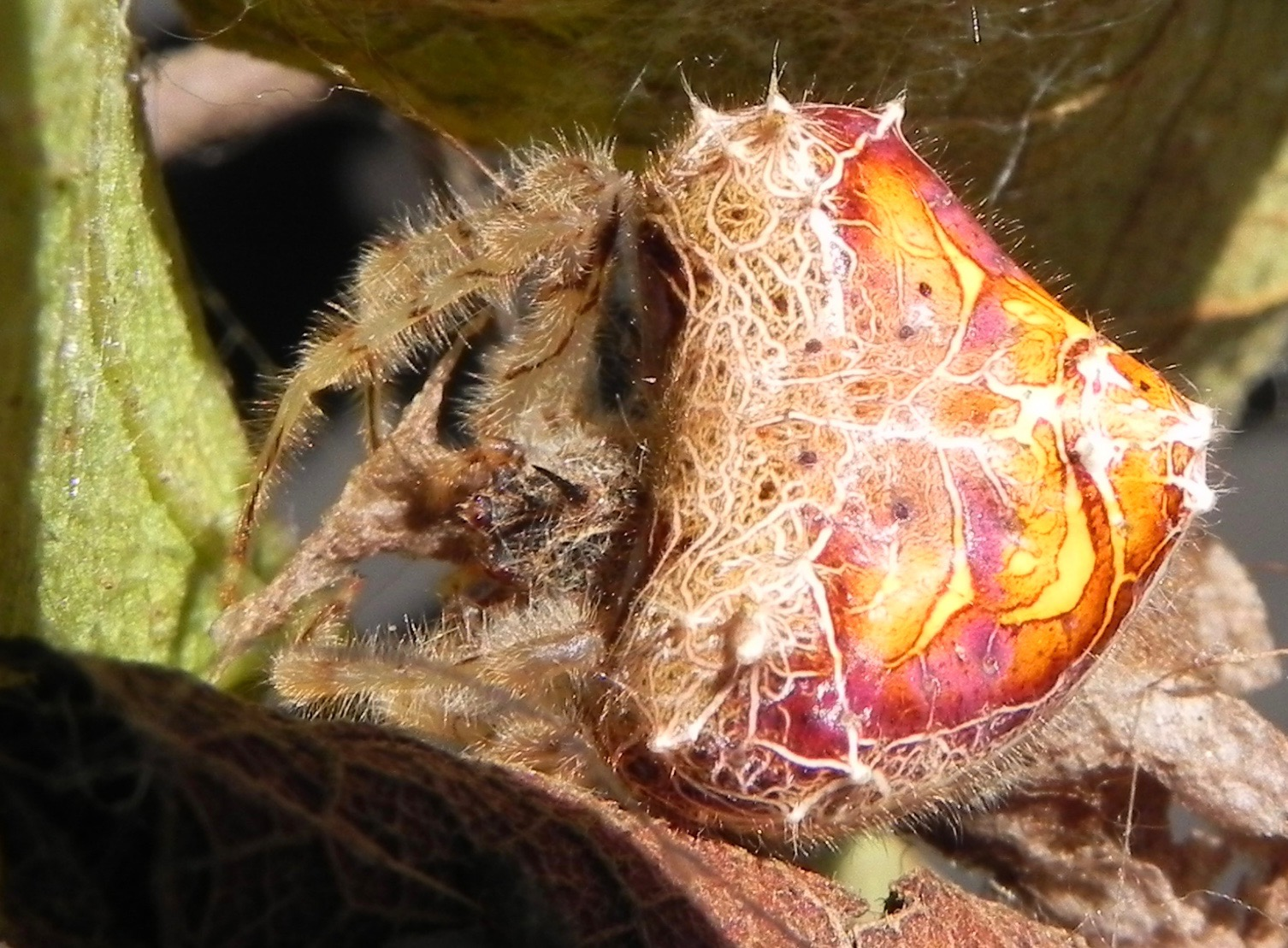

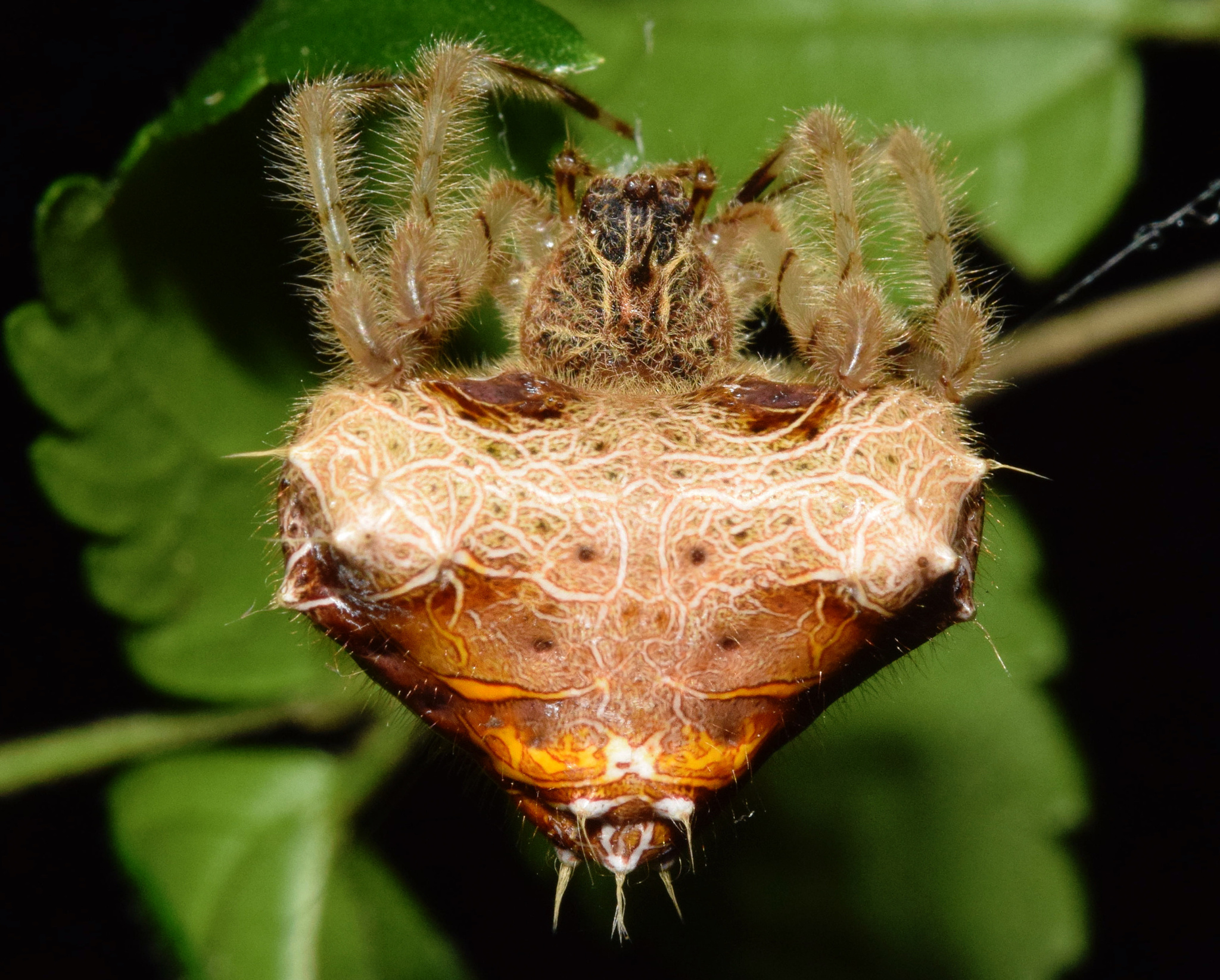

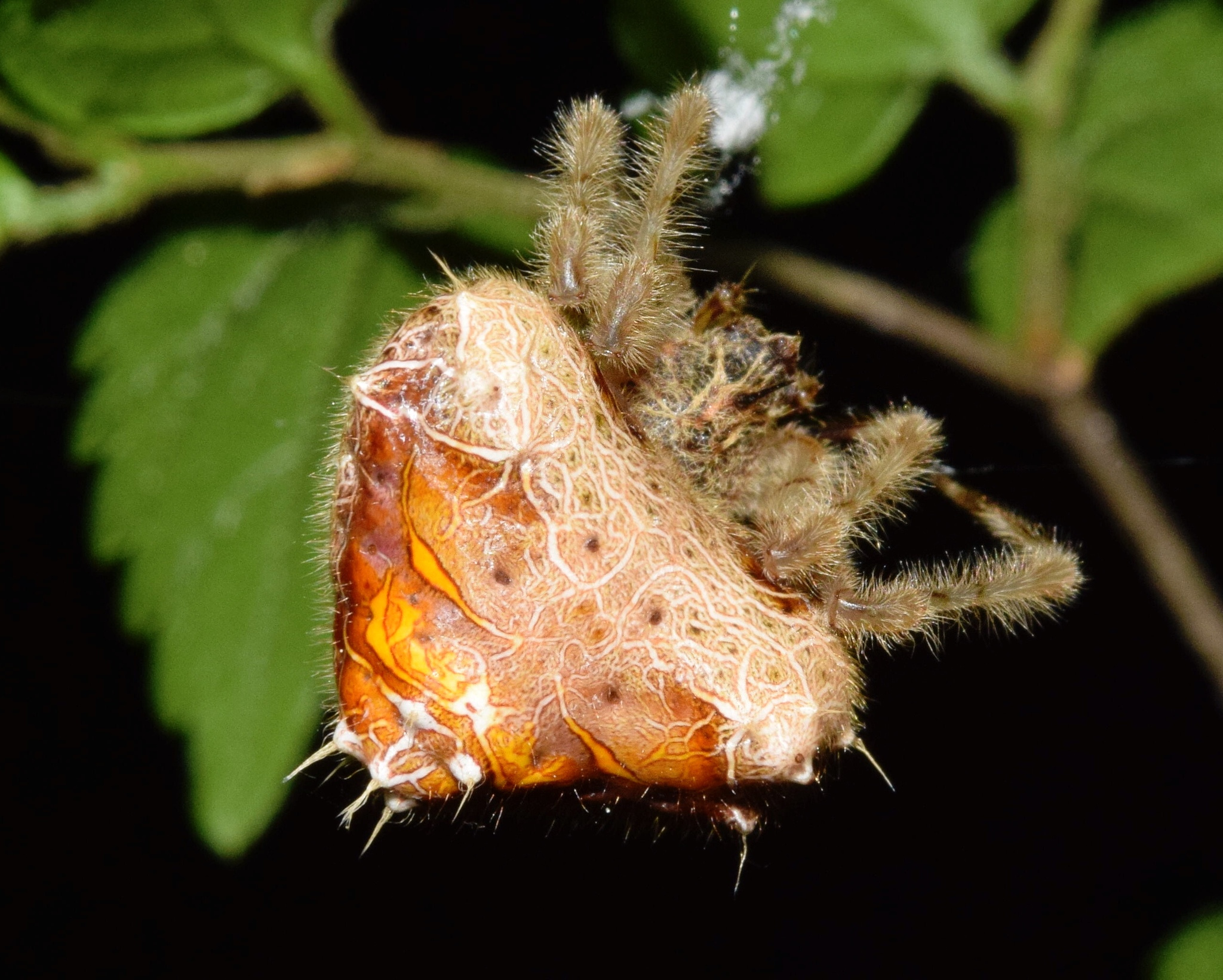

The female has a total length of 15.8 mm, with a carapace length of 3.8 mm and an abdomen length of 12.6 mm – the abdomen partly covers the carapace. The carapace is slightly wider than long, with a maximum width of 3.9 mm. The carapace is yellowish brown with a complex dark brown pattern and covered with long white wool-like setae.

The head region has four tubercules: a short one at the front, then a longer one, and then a pair of shorter ones. The eyes are arranged in two slightly recurved rows. The sternum is cream coloured. The abdomen is creamish yellow, shaped like a backward pointing triangle with five tubercules at each front corner and six at the back. Each tubercule has a darker tip and a tuft of long white setae.

The first leg is longest, 14.7 mmm. The spider's legs are creamish white with dark spiral-shaped bands on the femora, patellae and tibiae and longitudinal bands on the metatarsi.

The epigyne has no scape, only a small rounded lip. The male has not been described.

== Taxonomy ==
Cladomelea debeeri was first described by John Roff and Ansie Dippenaar-Schoeman in 2004. Cladomelea species are bolas spiders, and although the genus was not included in two relevant molecular phylogenetic studies in 2014 and 2020, would be expected to be part of the "mastophorines", placed in the subfamily Cyrtarachninae s.l.

== Conservation ==
Cladomelea debeeri is listed as Vulnerable by the South African National Biodiversity Institute. Although known from a restricted area, it is likely under-collected and more locations are suspected to occur. There is ongoing decline of its grassland habitat due to crop cultivation, forestry plantations and urban development.
