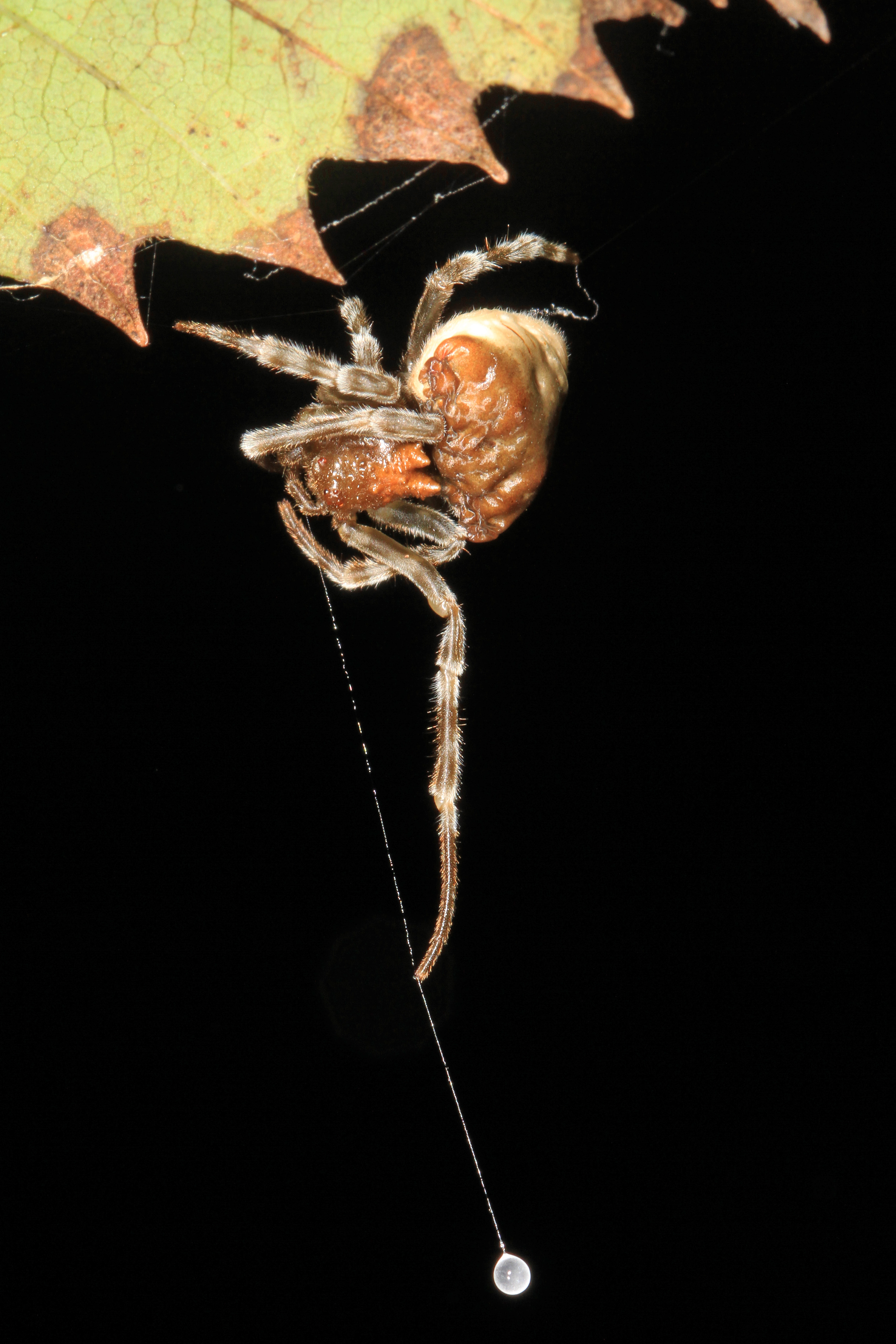
- Mastophora phrynosoma with bolas, Virginia, US

Scientific classification
- Kingdom: Animalia
- Phylum: Arthropoda
- Subphylum: Chelicerata
- Class: Arachnida
- Order: Araneae
- Infraorder: Araneomorphae
- Family: Araneidae
- Subfamily: Cyrtarachninae s.l.
- Informal group: Bolas spiders

Genera
- Cladomelea Simon, 1895; Exechocentrus Simon, 1889; Mastophora Holmberg, 1876; Ordgarius Keyserling, 1886

= Bolas spider =

Bolas spiders

Group of spiders that capture prey with a bolas

A bolas spider is a member of the orb-weaver spider (family Araneidae) that, instead of spinning a typical orb web, hunts by using one or more sticky "capture blobs" on the end of a silk line, known as a "bolas". By swinging the bolas at flying male moths or moth flies nearby, the spider may snag its prey rather like a fisherman snagging a fish on a hook. Because of this, they are also called angling or fishing spiders (although the remotely related genus Dolomedes is also called a fishing spider). The prey is lured to the spider by the production of up to three sex pheromone-analogues.

Bolas spiders have been treated as either the whole or part of either the tribe "Mastophoreae" or Mastophorini, the subfamily Mastophorinae, or the informal group mastophorines. Recent studies show that the genus Celaenia, which does not use a bolas, belongs in the same taxonomic group.

== Description ==
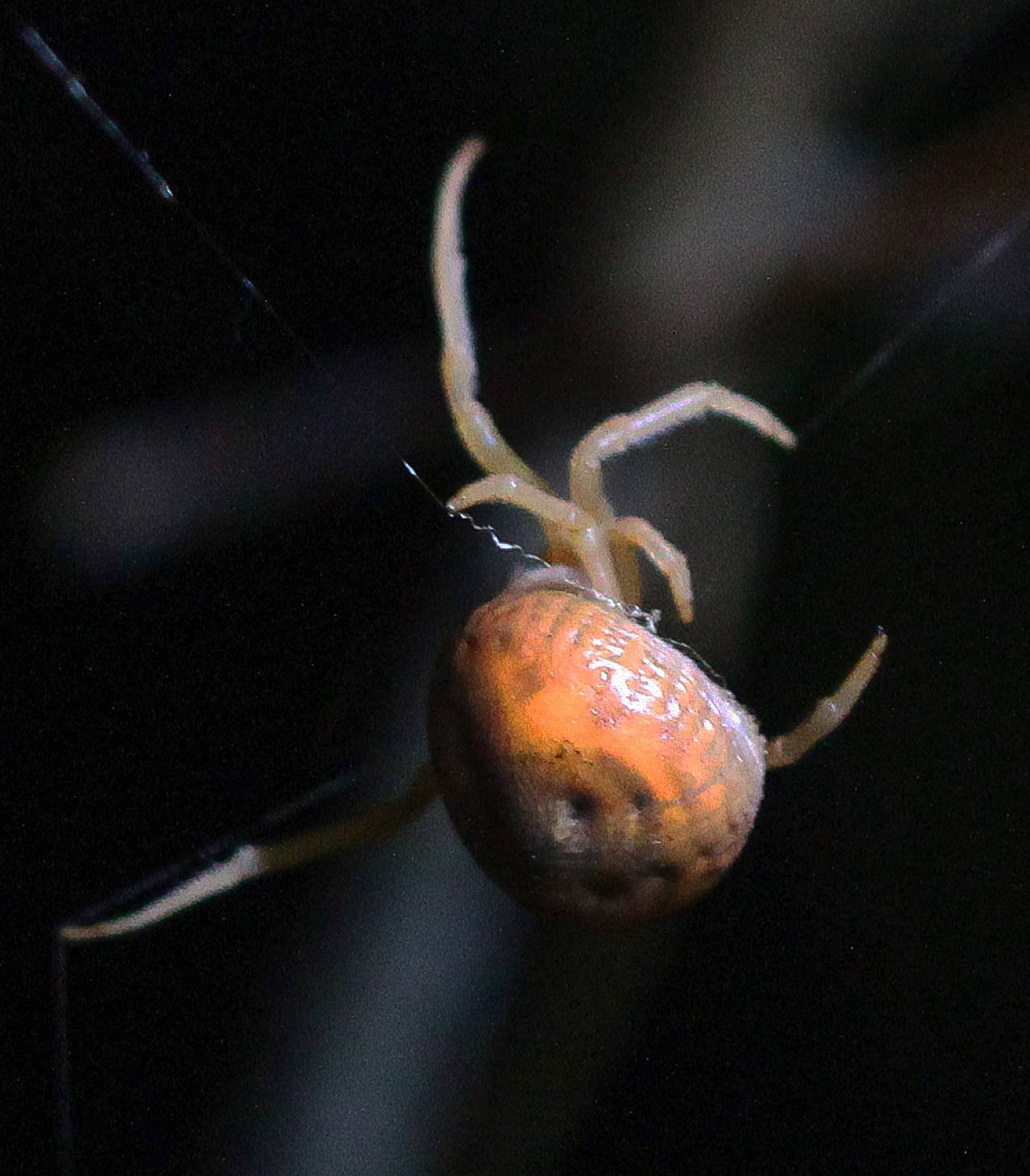
Mastophora bisaccata resembles a snail when at rest

Bolas spiders are small nocturnal animals with conspicuous outgrowths on the upper (dorsal) surface of the cephalothorax. Mature females have a body length of 10–20 mm (1/2–3/4 in), while the males, which are much smaller, have a body length usually less than 2 mm (1/16 in). The abdomen of adult females is large relative to the cephalothorax, partially covering it. In some species, the female's abdomen is comparatively smooth, while in others it has humps and tubercules. The females of some bolas spiders (e.g. Mastophora cornigera) look remarkably like a bird dropping, thanks to their large, globular abdomen and brownish cephalothorax. This is a form of defensive mimicry as the animals that prey on spiders pay little attention to bird droppings, which enables the spiders to rest unnoticed during the day in fairly exposed places. M. bisaccata resembles the shell of a snail that is abundant in the spider's habitat. While the bird dropping mimics rest on the upper surface of leaves, M. bisaccata rests on the undersides. If removed from the surface, Mastophora females produce a pungent odor, which is highly unusual for spiders (other than bolas spiders, only one species of Cyrtarachne is known to do this). They do not attempt to flee when handled. Some species of Cladomelea also rest exposed on leaves during the day. However, the Australian Ordgarius magnificus, which displays eye spots on its back that make it resemble the moth it hunts, ties leaves together with silk to form a retreat.

== Taxonomy ==
=== Genera ===
Bolas-using spiders are species of four related genera. (Distributions are from the World Spider Catalog.)

- Cladomelea Simon, 1895 – Central and South Africa
- Exechocentrus Simon, 1889 – Madagascar
- Mastophora Holmberg, 1876 (syn. Agathostichus) – North and South America
- Ordgarius Keyserling, 1886 (syn. Dicrostichus) – Australia north to India, China and Japan

The use of a bolas by the Madagascan genus Exechocentrus was not reported until 2012, so the genus is not included in earlier accounts of bolas spiders.

=== Classification ===
Bolas spiders are members of the family Araneidae, the orb-weaver spiders, although they do not weave webs. They may be treated as a group within the subfamily Cyrtarachninae sensu lato, or as the whole or part of a separate taxon. In 1931, Mello-Leitão created a tribe under the name Mastophoreae, which included genera now known to use a bolas as well the genus Acantharachne. Gertsch in 1955 also placed bolas spiders in the tribe Mastophoreae, again including Acantharachne (under the synonym Acantharanea). Article 29.2 of the International Code of Zoological Nomenclature states that the ending "-ini" should be used for tribes, so the correct name for the tribe is now "Mastophorini". The tribe has been elevated to a separate subfamily Mastophorinae. The informal name "mastophorines" has also been used, including both bolas-using spiders and a related genus.

A 2014 molecular phylogenetic study of a representative set of genera placed in Cyrtarachninae s.l. showed that the species of the two bolas spider genera included in the study formed a strongly supported clade nested within Cyrtarachninae s.l. A wider study of the family Araneidae published in 2020 reached a similar conclusion, separating Cyrtarachninae s.l. into two informal sister groups "mastophorines" and "cyrtarachines". Mastophorines included the genus Celaenia that does not use a bolas. Bolas-using spiders thus form a subgroup within the narrowly defined mastophorines or the broadly defined Cyrtarachninae.

=== Phylogeny and web evolution ===
The Cyrtarachninae, defined broadly, construct several kinds of web, which differ from the orb webs of other Araneidae. Some construct "spanning-thread webs", which have a small number of radii and widely spaced sticky threads that do not form spirals. Others construct triangular webs. These are formed in the same way as spanning-thread webs, but with only three radii, so that they appear triangular. Bolas spiders do not spin webs at all, adult females catching their prey on single sticky threads. Finally, some species capture their prey without a web, using their outstretched legs, as do juvenile and male bolas spiders.

One hypothesis was that the evolution of the web types involved successive reduction: spanning-thread webs → triangular webs → bolas → no web. However, the 2014 molecular phylogenetic study by Tanikawa et al. showed that this hypothesis did not fit with the evolutionary relationships they derived. Their cladogram is shown below. (The dashed line shows where the genus Exechocentrus would be expected to fall based on a 2020 study.) Triangular webs could have been derived from spanning-thread webs, but spiders with no webs or that used bolas formed a completely separate monophyletic group.

- Cyrtarachninae s.l.
  - mastophorines
    - Celaenia excavata
    - - Exechocentrus lancearius
      - - - Mastophora phrynosoma
          - Ordgarius magnificus
        - - Ordgarius hobsoni
          - Ordgarius sexspinosus
  - cyrtarachnines
    - - Cyrtarachne (5 spp.)
      - Paraplectana (2 spp.)
      - - Poecilopachys australasia
        - - Cyrtarachne nagasakiensis
          - - Cyrtarachne yunoharuensis
            - - Pasilobus hupingensis

Scharff et al. in a molecular phylogenetic study of the family Araneidae published in 2020 reached a similar conclusion concerning the relationships within the broadly defined Cyrtarachninae. They included the bolas-using genus Exechocentrus in their analysis (which has been added to the cladogram above), dividing Cyrtarachninae s.l. into "mastophorines" and "cyrtarachnines".

== Distribution ==
Bolas spiders are found in America, Africa including Madagascar, and Australasia northwards into Asia. They do not occur in temperate Eurasia. About half of the known Mastophora species occur in South America. The genus is distributed from southern Chile to the northern US (to 45° north latitude in Minnesota). M. archeri, M. bisaccata, M. hutchinsoni and M. phrynosoma occur widely in the US east of the Great Plains. M. cornigera occurs from Alabama to California, as well as in northern Mexico.

== Life-cycle ==
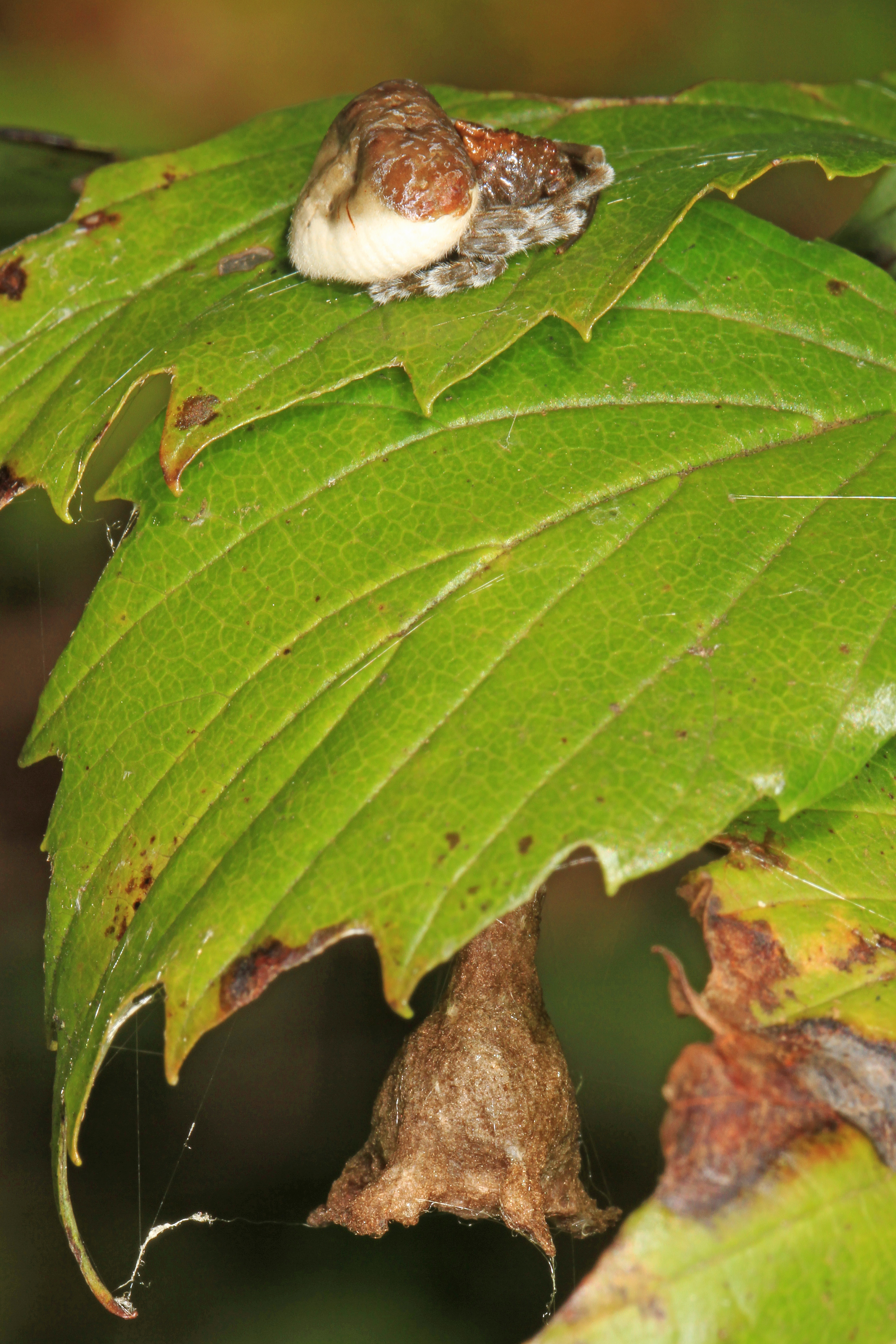
Mastophora phrynosoma resting in full view, resembling a bird dropping; egg sac under the leaf

The life-cycle of the North American Mastophora hutchinsoni is best known. As is probably the case for other Mastophora species in temperate regions, mating takes place in late summer or early fall, after which egg cases are produced. Adults do not survive the winter, males typically dying before females. A similar pattern is observed for bolas spiders in the Southern Hemisphere, depending on the climate. In the subtropical climate of Edmonton in north Queensland, Australia, a female Ordgarius monstrosus matured in June and produced egg cases between late June and early September. In Pietermaritzburg, South Africa, adult females of Cladomelea akermani were observed with egg cases during July. The number of egg cases varies widely among species, with temperate species producing fewer than tropical ones (e.g. one to three for Mastophora species in temperate regions of the United States, and up to 11 for M. dizzydeani near the equator). The number of eggs per case also varies depending on the climate, so that the total number of spiderlings produced by one female ranges from several hundred in the temperate US to several thousand in Colombia.

Some male bolas spiders, such as those of Mastophora cornigera and Ordgarius magnificus, appear to be mature on emergence from their egg cases and so capable of inseminating females. Others, such as those of M. dizzydeani, M. hutchinsoni and M. phrynosoma require one or two moults before becoming mature. By contrast, Mastophora females may require up to eight moults to reach maturity.

== Prey capture ==
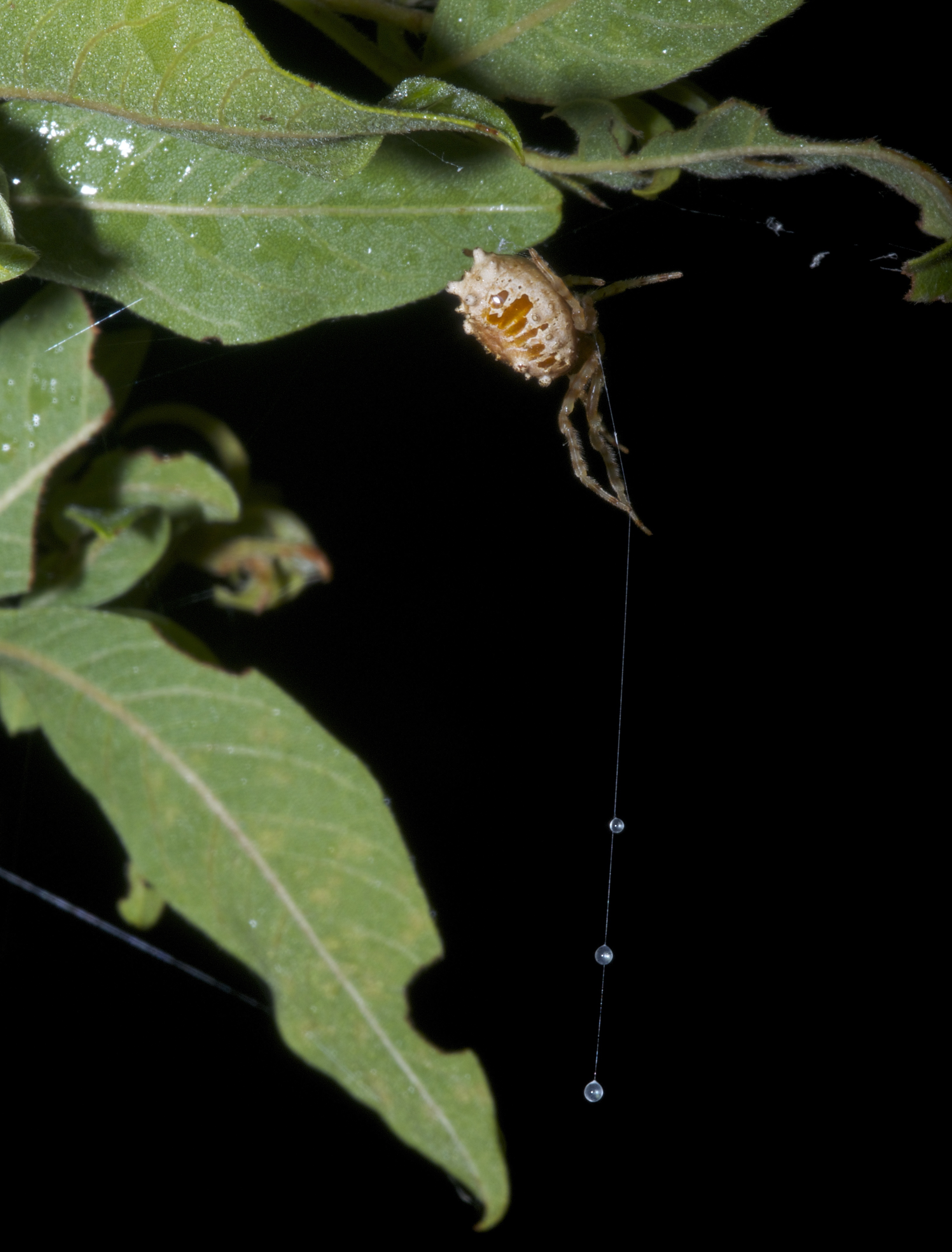
Cladomelea sp. from South Africa with multiple drops on its bolas line

Bolas spiders are defined by the way in which adults catch their prey. Like other members of the subfamily Cyrtarachninae sensu lato, bolas spiders specialize in catching moths. The scales covering moth wings are detachable, so that most ordinary orb webs are not effective at capturing moths. Adult female bolas spiders spend the day resting, disguised in various ways, including as bird droppings. At night, they feed on male moths which they attract by producing a scent that mimics the sex pheromones emitted by the female of one or more species of moth. They capture approaching male moths by using a "bolas", a silken thread with one or more sticky drops at the end which they swing, rather than throw, at the moth. Other spiders in the subfamily Cyrtarachninae, including Celaenia species from Australia and Taczanowskia species from South America, also use chemical lures to attract moths, but they catch them with their front legs.

Bolas spiders will try and often succeed in catching any insect that is flying nearby. They seem able to detect prey by the sound of their approaching flight. In experiments, M. cornigera attacked a hand-held moth whose wings were fluttering, but did not attack if the moth's wings were immobilized.

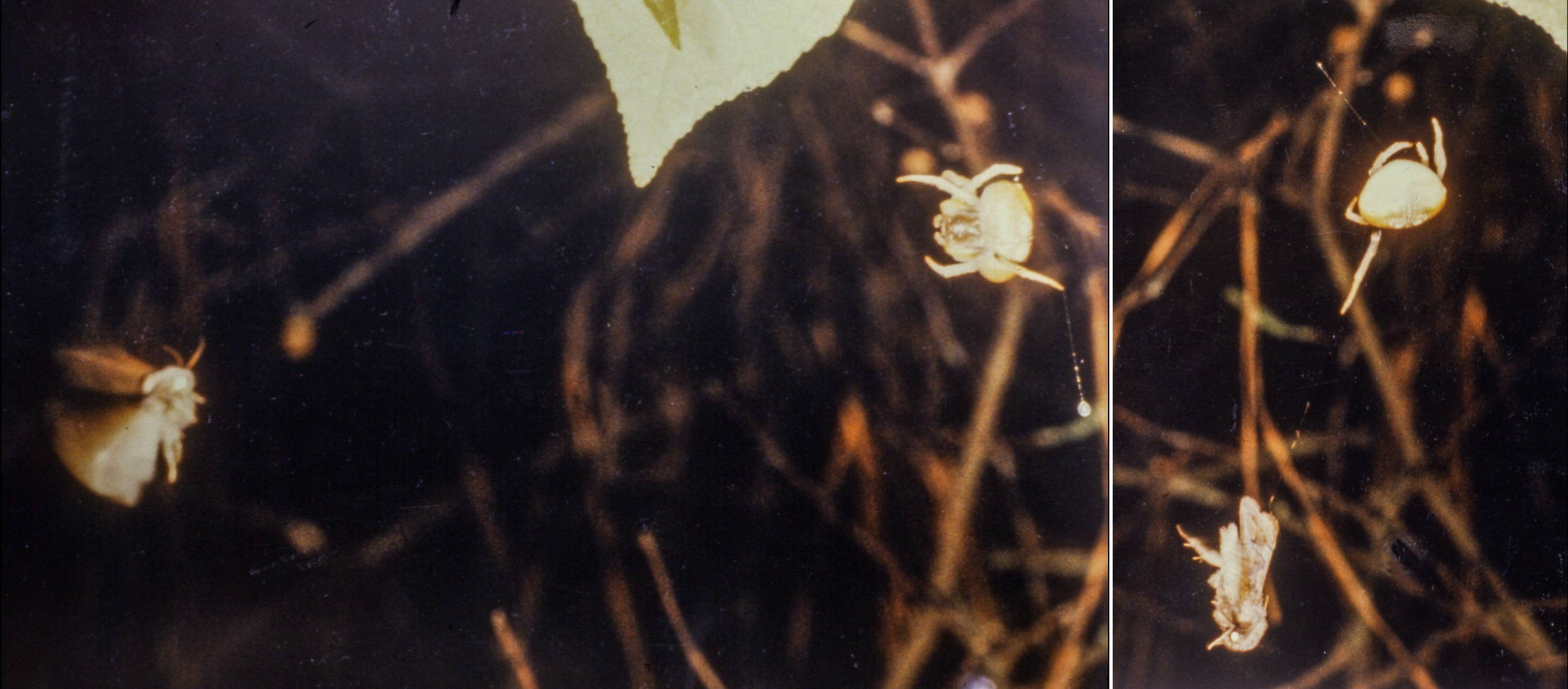
Left: Mastophora cornigera attracting a moth while holding its bolas; right: with captured moth

The manner in which the bolas is used differs among the genera. Mastophora species hold the bolas stationary with a front leg until a moth approaches, and then cock the leg and swing the bolas towards the prey with a rapid pendulum-like stroke. Other genera use their second leg. Ordgarius species begin to whirl the bolas rapidly when detecting an incoming moth. Cladomelea akermani whirls the bolas immediately after it has been prepared for about 15 minutes, even when there is no moth present. Instead of preparing a single bolas, at least four Mastophora species are known to sometimes hang up to nine droplets on one horizontal line. This has not been observed to result in prey capture, but is remarkably similar to the midline of a Pasilobus web in which the spanning threads have been broken.

Spiderlings of both sexes and adult males hunt without a bolas. This might be because the small globule these spiders could produce would dry out rapidly. Rather, they position themselves at edges of leaves and grab prey with their frontal pair of legs. Juvenile females and males of all ages of M. hutchinsoni have a row of strong bristles on the prolateral surface of the tibiae and metatarsi of each of their first two pairs of legs which may aid in prey capture. Females lose these bristles after a few moults. Moth flies of the genus Psychoda are prominent prey of juvenile and adult male Mastophora.

=== Drop structure ===
The sticky drops of the bolas have a diameter of about 2.5 mm (1/10 in). Their internal structure is complex, consisting of a mass of curled or folded fibre embedded in a viscid matrix which is in turn surrounded by a less viscous layer. This results in the low viscosity liquid flowing past the moth's scales to reach the cuticle below, while the more viscous liquid forms a bond to the thread to sustain the moth's weight. The folded thread inside the ball permits elastic elongations which extend the spider's striking range. Ordgarius sometimes has smaller droplets above the terminal one. Exechocentrus lancearius uses a bolas with two globules. The other genera usually produce only one terminal globule. The drop shrinks over time, thus presumably reducing its effectiveness in catching prey. Bolas spiders consume unused bolas after at most half an hour if the hunt was fruitless.

=== Prey variety ===
Female Mastophora catch an average of two moths per night, but as many as six or seven catches during a single night have been observed. Bolas spiders vary in the range of moth species they capture, with 20 moth species recorded for Mastophora cornigera females, mostly noctuids, and four for Mastophora hutchinsoni females, three of which were noctuids. A study of M. hutchinsoni showed that the blend of chemicals produced by the spider was very similar to that produced by the female of the bristly cutworm, Lacinipolia renigera, whose males make up about two thirds of the biomass consumed by the spider. A study by K.F. Haynes showed that M. hutchinsoni females adapt to changes in prey availability, with one major prey species flying from early evening until 10:30 pm or so and the other only after 11:00 pm. The first moth ignores the pheromone of the second, so the spider produces a mix of both pheromones early in the evening. However, since the second moth is repulsed by the other moth's pheromone, the spider ceases to produce the first pheromone later at night.

== Natural enemies ==
Yeargan noted that records of natural enemies of bolas spiders all concern predators or parasitoids of the egg stage. A gryllacridid was observed feeding on the eggs of Ordgarius magnificus, and a flesh fly parasitoid has been reared from egg cases of the same species. Five species of hymenopteran parasitoids are known to attack Mastophora eggs. Tromatobia notator parasitizes M. cornigera, M. bisaccata and M. phrynosoma; a Gelis species parasitizes M. cornigera. Eupelmids in the genus Arachnophaga also parasitize Mastophora species.

== Bibliography ==
- Foelix, Rainer F. (2011). Biology of Spiders (3rd p/b ed.). Oxford University Press. ISBN 978-0-19-973482-5.
- Scharff, N.; Coddington, J.A. (1997). "A phylogenetic analysis of the orb-weaving spider family Araneidae (Arachnida, Araneae)". Zoological Journal of the Linnean Society. 120 (4): 355–434. doi:10.1111/j.1096-3642.1997.tb01281.x.
