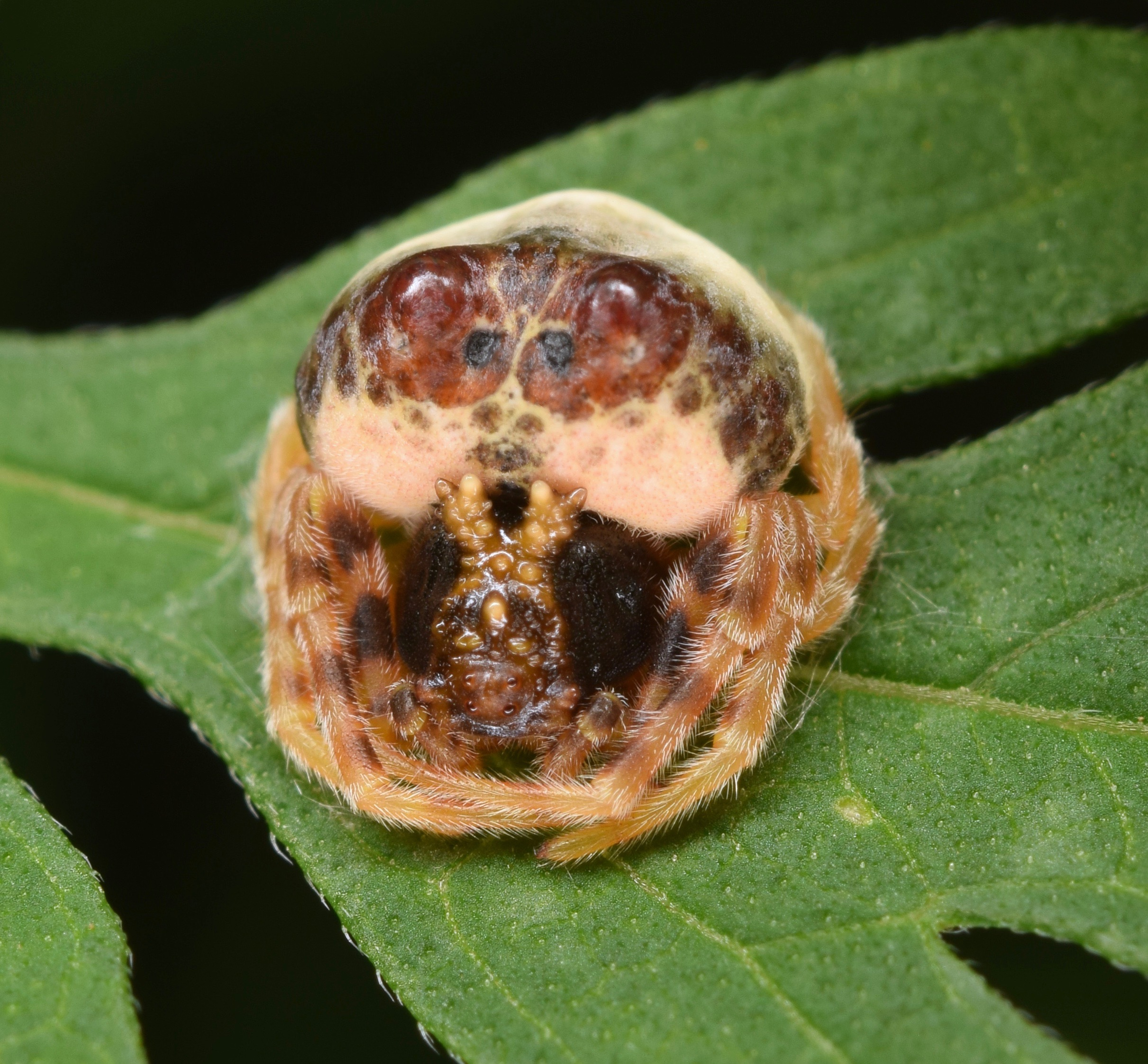
- Female

Scientific classification
- Kingdom: Animalia
- Phylum: Arthropoda
- Subphylum: Chelicerata
- Class: Arachnida
- Order: Araneae
- Infraorder: Araneomorphae
- Family: Araneidae
- Genus: Mastophora
- Species: M. hutchinsoni

Binomial name
- Mastophora hutchinsoni Gertsch, 1955

= Mastophora hutchinsoni =

American bolas spider

Species of spider

Mastophora hutchinsoni, also known as the American bolas spider, is a species of orb weaver in the genus Mastophora. The genus is distributed extensively throughout various subtropical geographical areas including Australia, South Africa, Oriental Asia, and the Americas and is not found in Europe. The hunting behavior of adult female M. hutchinsoni is unusual because they are bolas spiders. They mimic moth pheromones to attract male moths, and female M. hutchinsoni have evolved to alter their chemical release to target different moths. They then capture their prey with a sticky drop on the end of a silk line, resembling a bolas.

== Description ==
The female spiders have a large spherical abdomen with a milky white base often covered in darker brown patterns and a smaller brown carapace. There is a clear distinction between the two sexes as extreme sexual dimorphism results in much larger females. Although both sexes hatch with their cephalothorax range being around 0.5 mm, the female develops into a significantly larger specimen than her male counterpart. The size difference coheres with the divergence of their respective hunting behaviors. While female bolas spiders hang from a horizontal thread waiting to swing her bolas or sticky orb towards her nearby prey (typically moths), the males do not use a bolas but implement hunting tactics reminiscent of early-instar spiders.

== Population structure, speciation, and phylogeny ==
M. hutchinsoni are part of the Mastophora genus within the larger Araineida or orb-weaver family. They are in the Arthropoda phylum, the Arachnida class, and the Araneae order. Originally stemming from normal orb weavers, the genus adopted an alternative web design (the bolas) and widely distributed throughout the world.

== Distribution and habitat ==
=== Distribution ===
Mastophora are widely distributed throughout the world in temperate climates except for Euro Asia and South Africa. The M. hutchinsoni primarily reside in the northeastern regions of North America near areas of a more temperate climate. The range of locations in North America are from Minnesota to New Hampshire.

=== Habitat ===
M. hutchinsoni primarily nest and feed in shrubs or short trees, where they hunt and build their webs. These spiders will often utilize nearby leaves and twigs as a location to place their egg sacs. Due to the limited range of prey affected by the female’s aggressive mimicry technique, the predator frequently moves to different locations according to prey availability. They do so by riding a silken thread that travels with the direction of the wind.

== Behavior ==
=== Diet and predation ===
==== Adult female diet ====
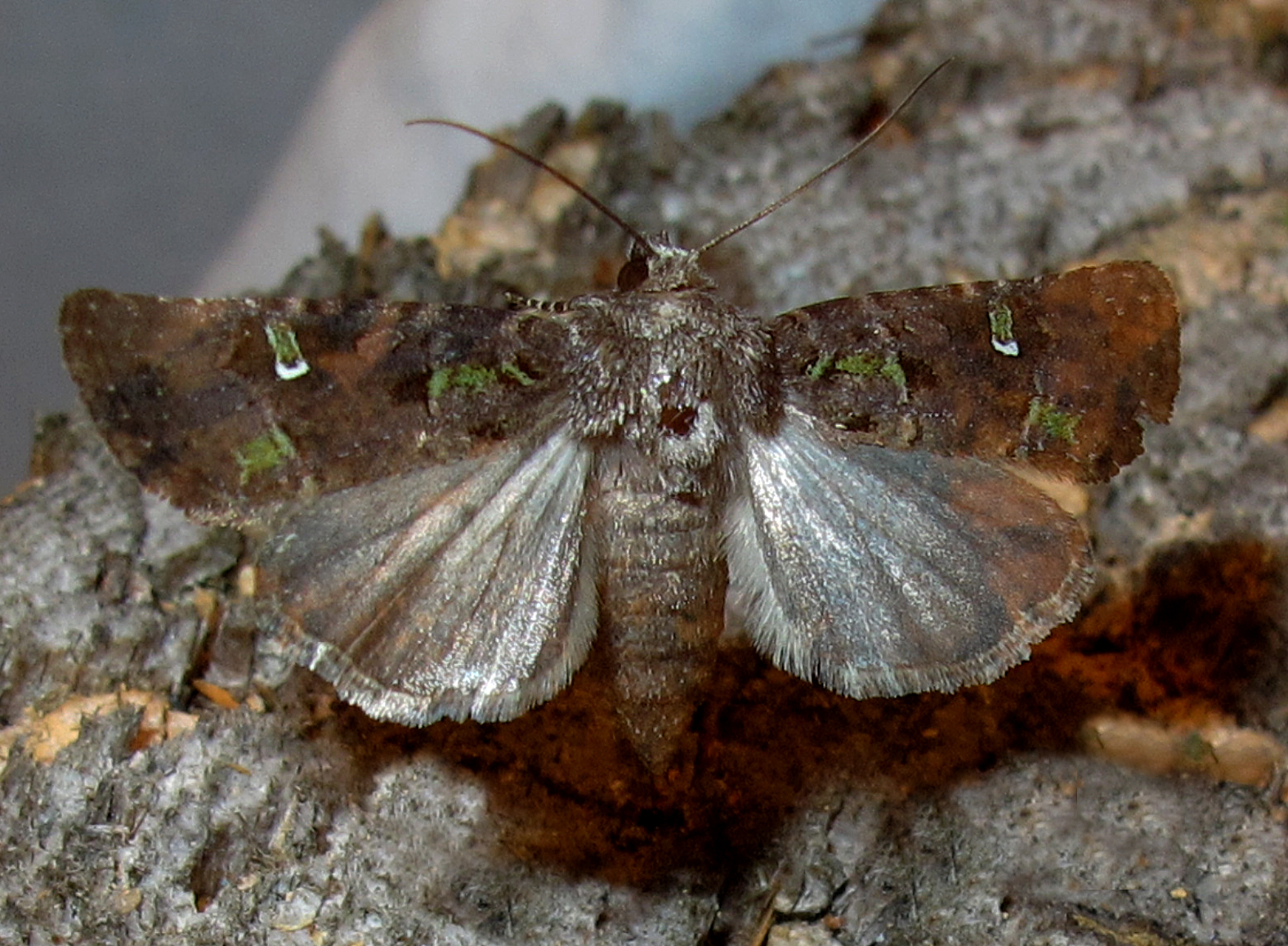
Lacinipolia renigera

As a result of a highly specialized hunting technique that mimics the disparate chemical compositions of its prey, the hunting range for the M. hutchinsoni is limited to a couple families of male moths. The females typically hunt either Noctuidae moths consisting of the bristly cut-worm, bronzed cutworm, and smoky tetanolita or the bluegrass worm of the Pyralidae family during prime activity hours in the evening, which results in nocturnal hunting patterns. In particular, the Lacinipolia renigera (bristly cut-worm) constitutes two-thirds of total prey biomass and, together with the Tetanolita mynesalis (smoky tetanolita), makes up to ninety percent of the overall diet of M. hutchinsoni. Adult females will often capture more than one moth per night.

===== Aggressive pheromone mimicry =====
Female M. hutchinsoni employ a specialized hunting tactic where they aggressively mimic the pheromones of moths to attract male moths near their bolas trap. Female moths produce a complex pheromone typically combining two compounds in a ratio specific to the species. This allows male moths to easily distinguish between mates of different species. The periods of activity for each moth are also different. For instance, the bristly cut-worm is active earlier in the night than the smoky tetanolita. Thus, the female spiders must adjust the level of chemicals produced to accommodate for different moths.

==== Spiderling diet ====
Instead of producing bolas like adult females to capture their prey, spiderlings remain motionless in the margins of leaves in shrubs or trees and wait to quickly ambush small flies that pass. In preparation for capture, the early-instar spiders extend both of their front legs which contain small bristles that aid in capture. These immature spiders also seem to attract male Psychoda using a mechanism near to or the same as aggressive chemical mimicry.

==== Adult male diet ====
The males do not construct a bolas to capture. Although females lose the strong bristles on their front legs after maturation, the males retain these features. Accordingly, it seems that they reserve hunting tactics similar to juvenile spiders. Thus, the male spiders have a similar diet to spiderlings--psychodid flies .

=== Webs ===
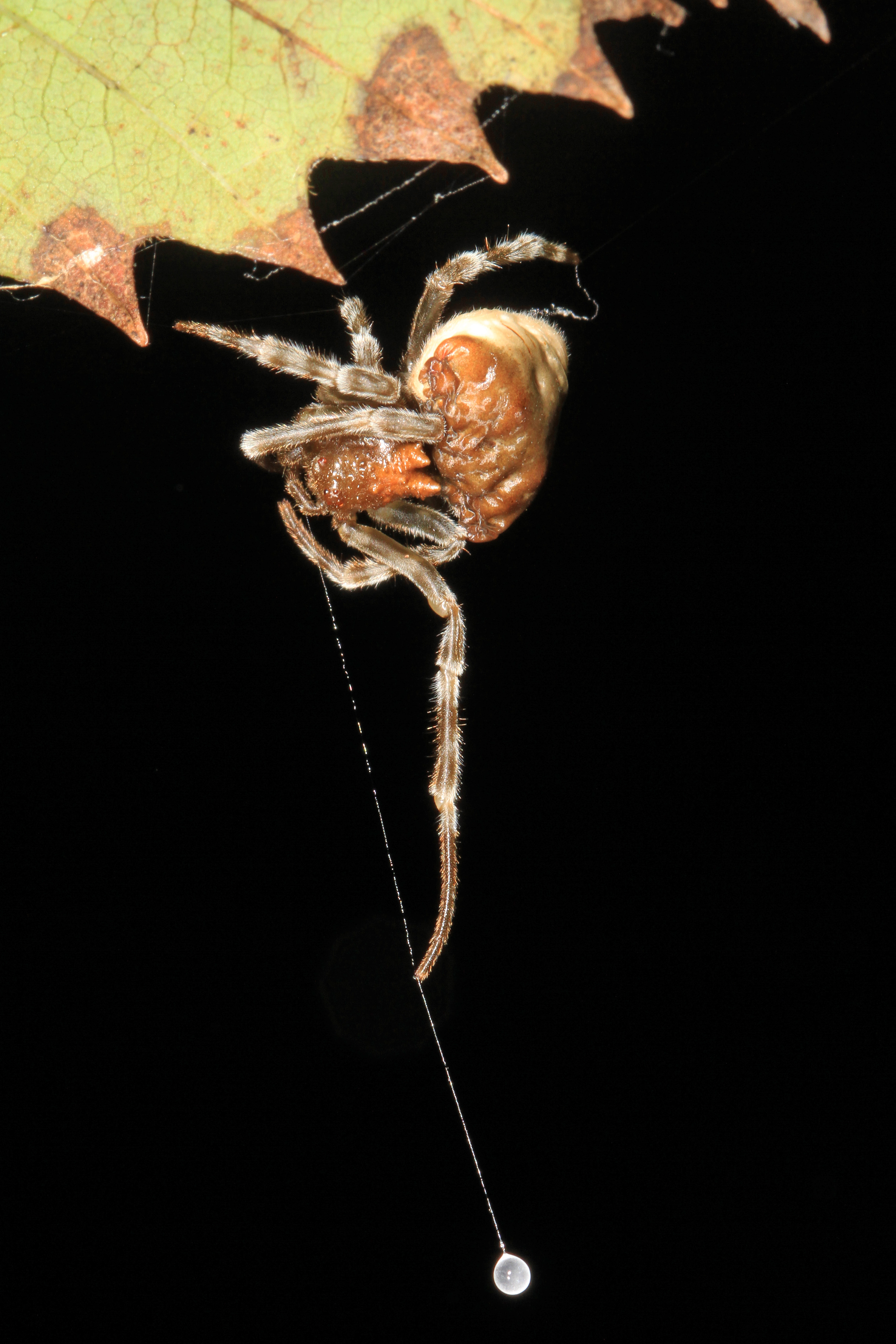
Bolas Web Design

Unlike many of the web designs constructed by its closely related species in the family of orb weavers, M. hutchinsoni do not form the typical two-dimensional orb web. Instead, the females primarily reside in a nearby leaf or plant while producing a single horizontal thread which they stay on and travel across during times of predation. At the terminal end, the spider forms an extremely adhesive orb which it quickly hurls in a circular pattern to capture flying prey. The bolas is much more efficient at capturing moths as it prevents the prey from escaping through shedding its scales--an escape mechanism that would otherwise work on typical orb webs. If there is no prey captured after a short while, the Mastophora brings the orb back and consumes it--preparing to form another one to replace the former. Such behavior has been attributed to the short-term efficacy of the orb’s stickiness. Accordingly, after a single use of the bolas, the female must form another if intending to hunt more prey.

=== Life cycle ===
Spiderlings will hatch during the spring. The rate of development between the two sexes will differ as males develop much more quickly than females. While the males fully develop during the summer months, the females mature around the fall season. During this gap, the mature males often leave their webs and reside in the webs of developing females awaiting to mate.

== Eggs ==
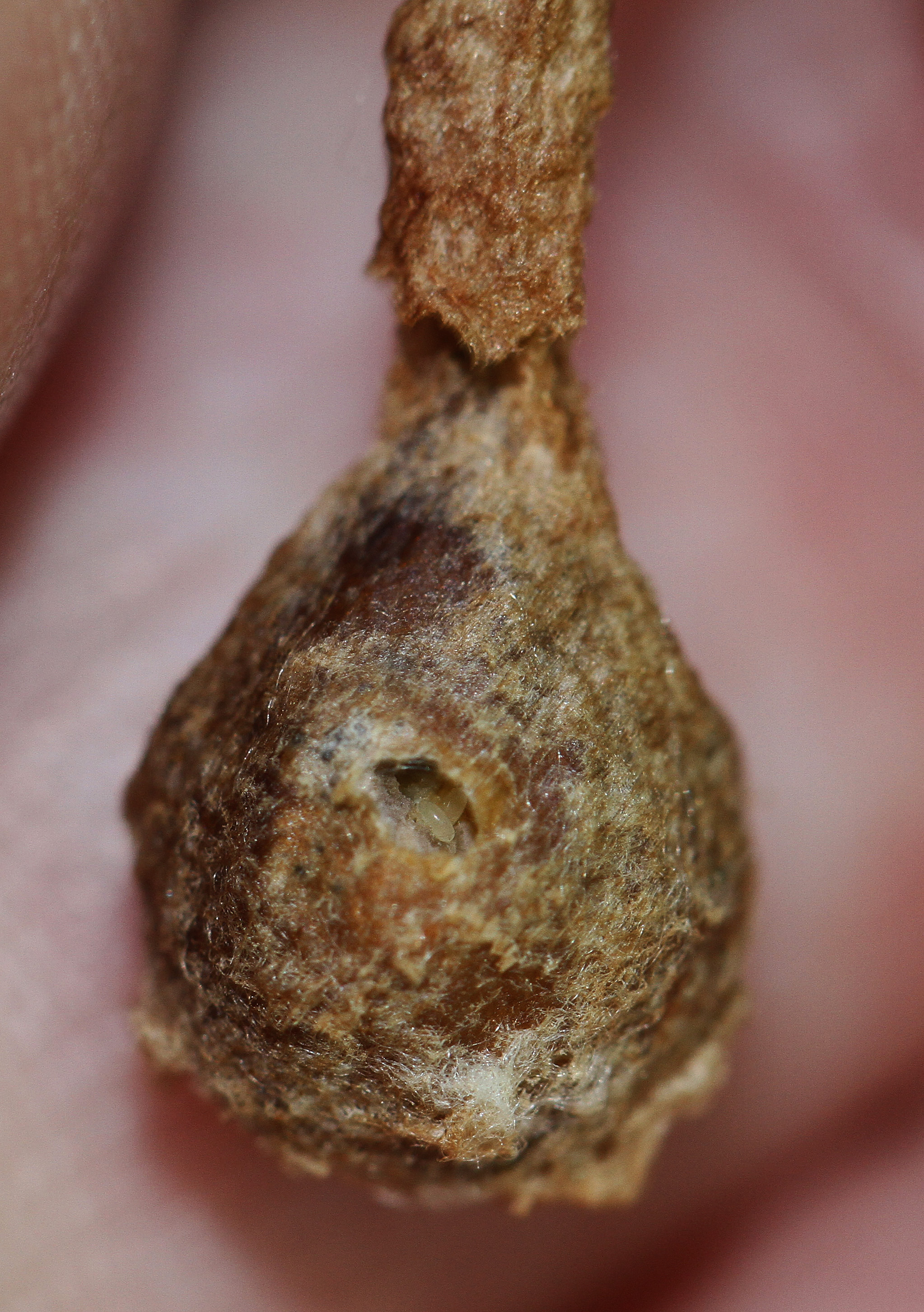
Bolas Spider egg sac with eggs inside

The egg sacs of the M. hutchinsoni are spherical in shape with an extended stem typically surrounded by multiple protective layers and an off-white silk. The globose vessels have a diameter around 8 mm while the connected stem extends up to thirty-six millimeters. The base of the egg is typically attached to either a branch of twig.

== Protective coloration ==
Considering the extreme sexual dimorphism resulting in a noticeably large size, M. Hutchinsoni adult females fashion a more cryptic coloration with a white palette and dark brown patterns. Meanwhile, the male bolas spiders are much smaller with reddish-brown hue. Moreover, the female’s large globular abdomen allows it to resemble bird droppings sitting on leaves. The bolas spider makes use of this resemblance as a defensive mechanism to avoid encounters with potential predators.

== Physiology ==
Pheromone blends of moth species are unique and may interfere with each other resulting in reduced efficacy or failed mimicry. To accommodate such discrepancies, the bolas spider continuously produces a substandard blend of both pheromones elements and adjusts the amount of emission as time moves from one species’ zone of activity to another.

=== Moth pheromone ===
The pheromone compositions are unique to their respective species of moth--this differentiation helps male moths recognize the correct mating partner. Accordingly, the pheromones usually contain a blend of multiple chemical components. The bristly cutworm which makes up the majority of the diet of the M. hutchinsoni emits a pheromone with (Z)-9-tetradecenyl acetate (Z9-14: Ac) and 3.8 percent (Z,E)-9,12-tetradecenyl acetate (ZE-9, 12-14: Ac). M. Meanwhile, Tetanolita mynesalis, the other main food source, emits a blend with two parts (3Z, 9Z)-(6S, 7R)-epoxy heneocosadiene and one part (3Z, 6Z, 9Z)-heneicosatrience). Nephelodes minians (the bronzed cutworm) holds a chemical composition consisting of a blend of (Z)-11-hexadecenal and (Z)-11- hexadecenyl acetate. M. hutchinsoni is not only able to synthesize the components of different chemical blends but also mimic the exact ratios.

=== Wing vibration ===
Despite being nocturnal hunters, M. hutchinsoni have poor vision and rather rely on prey wing vibrations to trigger bolas construction. The female has tiny hairs on her legs that are sensitive to such vibrations. Using a cabbage looper moth as an intermediate wing vibration rate for the L.renigera and T. mynelasis, the bolas spider constructs a bolas a few minutes after being exposed to wing vibrations.

== Bites to animals ==
The M. hutchinsoni females produce venom to fatally impair her prey. After the M. hutchinsoni successfully attracts and traps the moth prey on the sticky bolas, the spider quickly reels the moth to herself, paralyzes the moth with a venomous bite, and wraps the prey in an envelope of silk to preserve the meal. The venom of Mastophora is not recorded to be dangerous toward humans or large animals.
