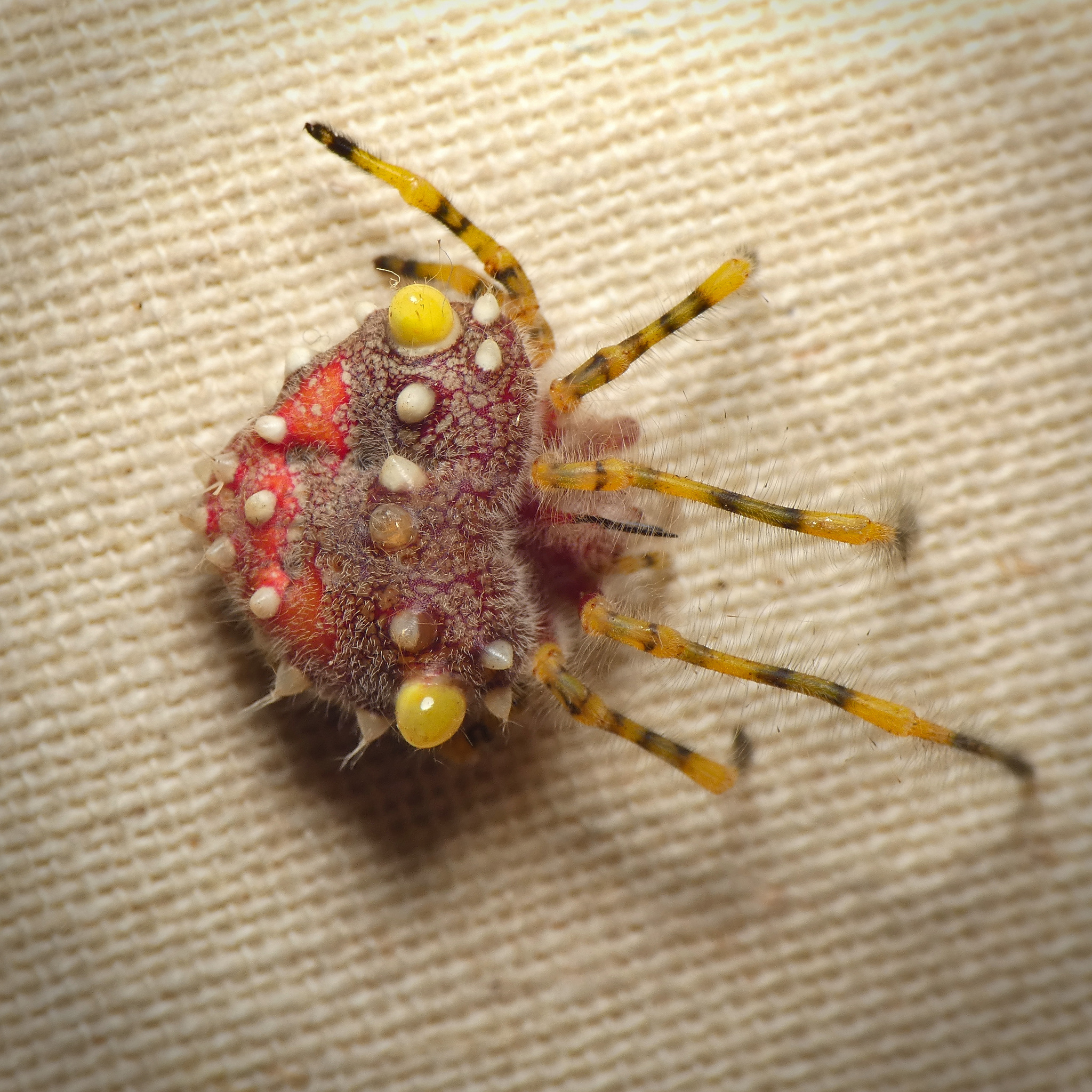
- female C. longipes
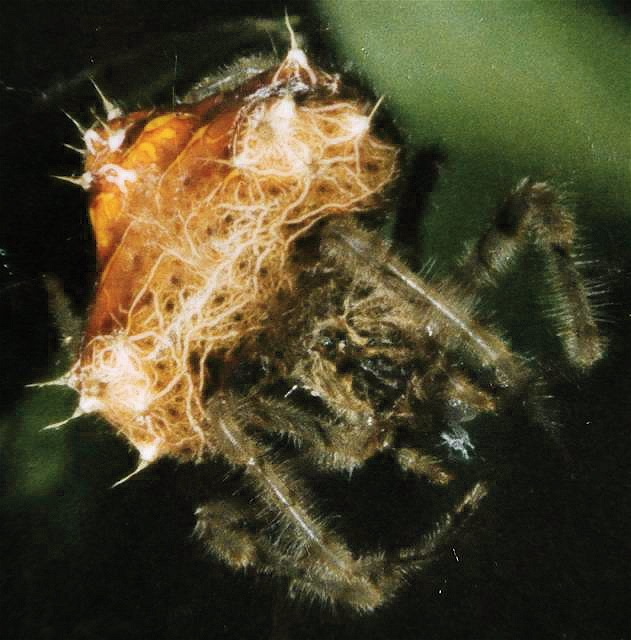
- female C. debeeri

Scientific classification
- Kingdom: Animalia
- Phylum: Arthropoda
- Subphylum: Chelicerata
- Class: Arachnida
- Order: Araneae
- Infraorder: Araneomorphae
- Family: Araneidae
- Subfamily: Cyrtarachninae s.l.
- Genus: Cladomelea; Simon, 1895

Type species
- C. longipes (O. Pickard-Cambridge, 1877)

Species
- 4, see text

= Cladomelea =

Genus of spiders

Cladomelea is a genus of African orb-weaver spiders first described by Eugène Simon in 1895. Adult females of the genus are bolas spiders, capturing their prey with one or more sticky drops at the end of a single line of silk rather than in a web. Males and juvenile females capture their prey directly with their legs.

== Species ==
As of November 2026, this genus includes four species:

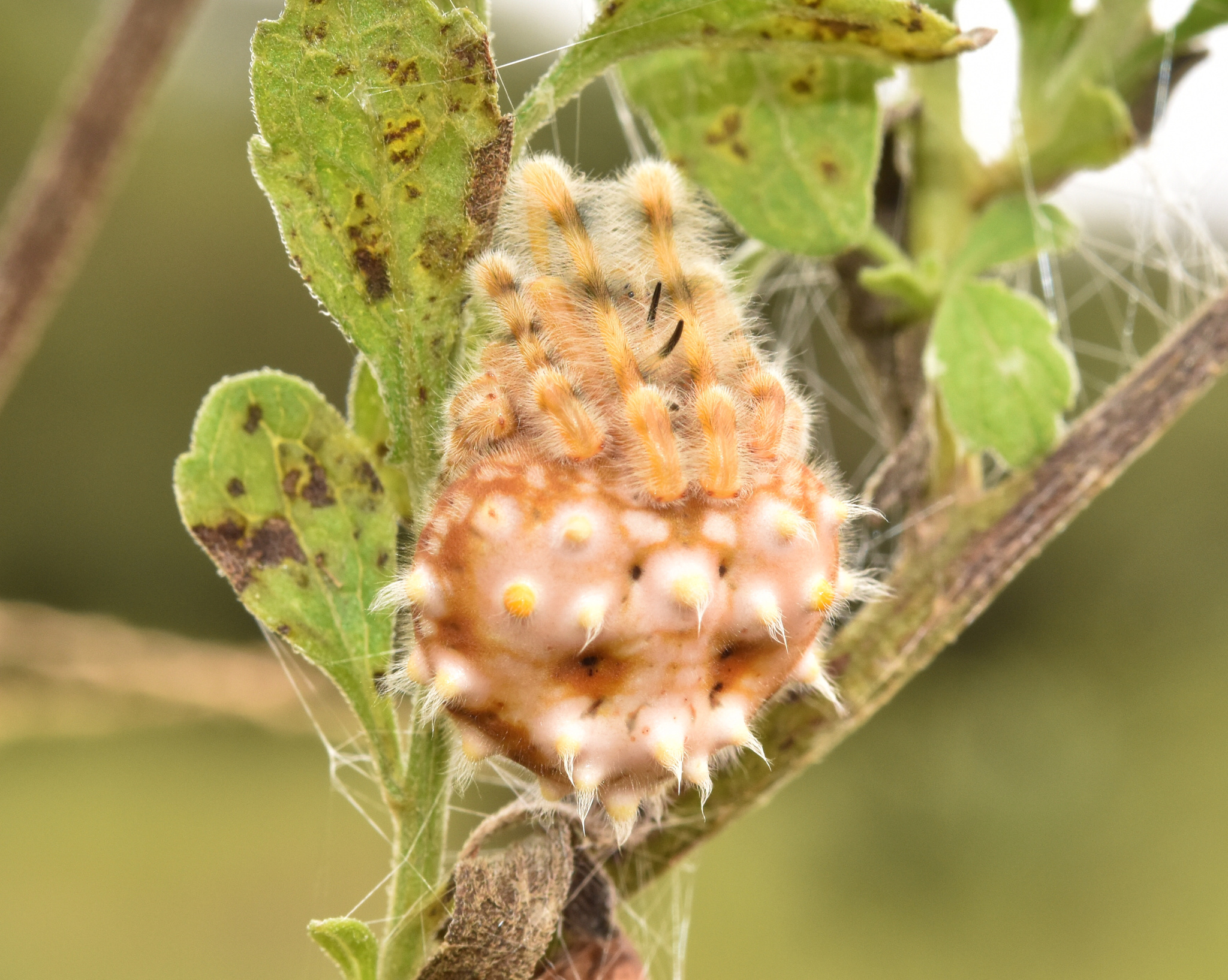
C. akermani

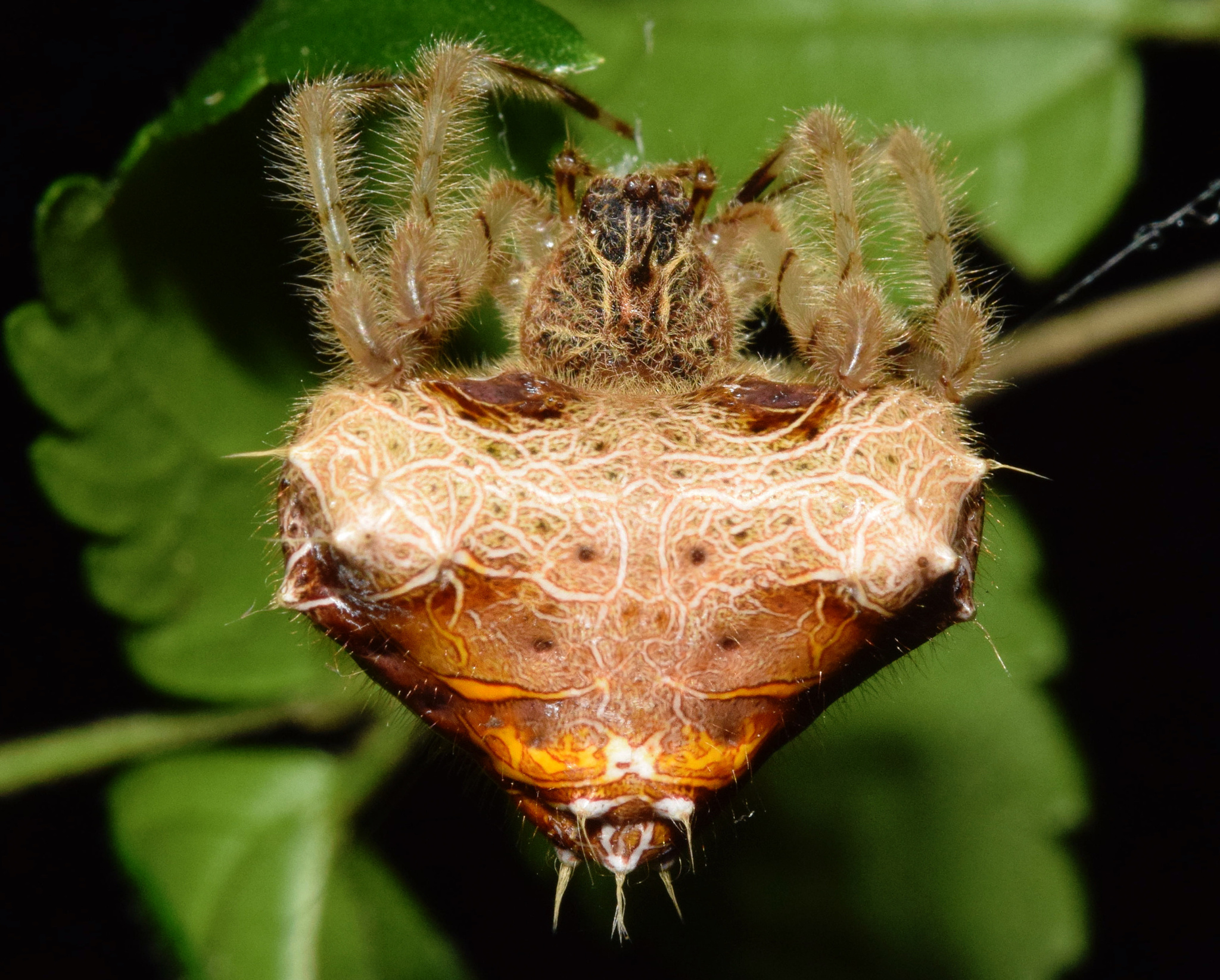
C. debeeri

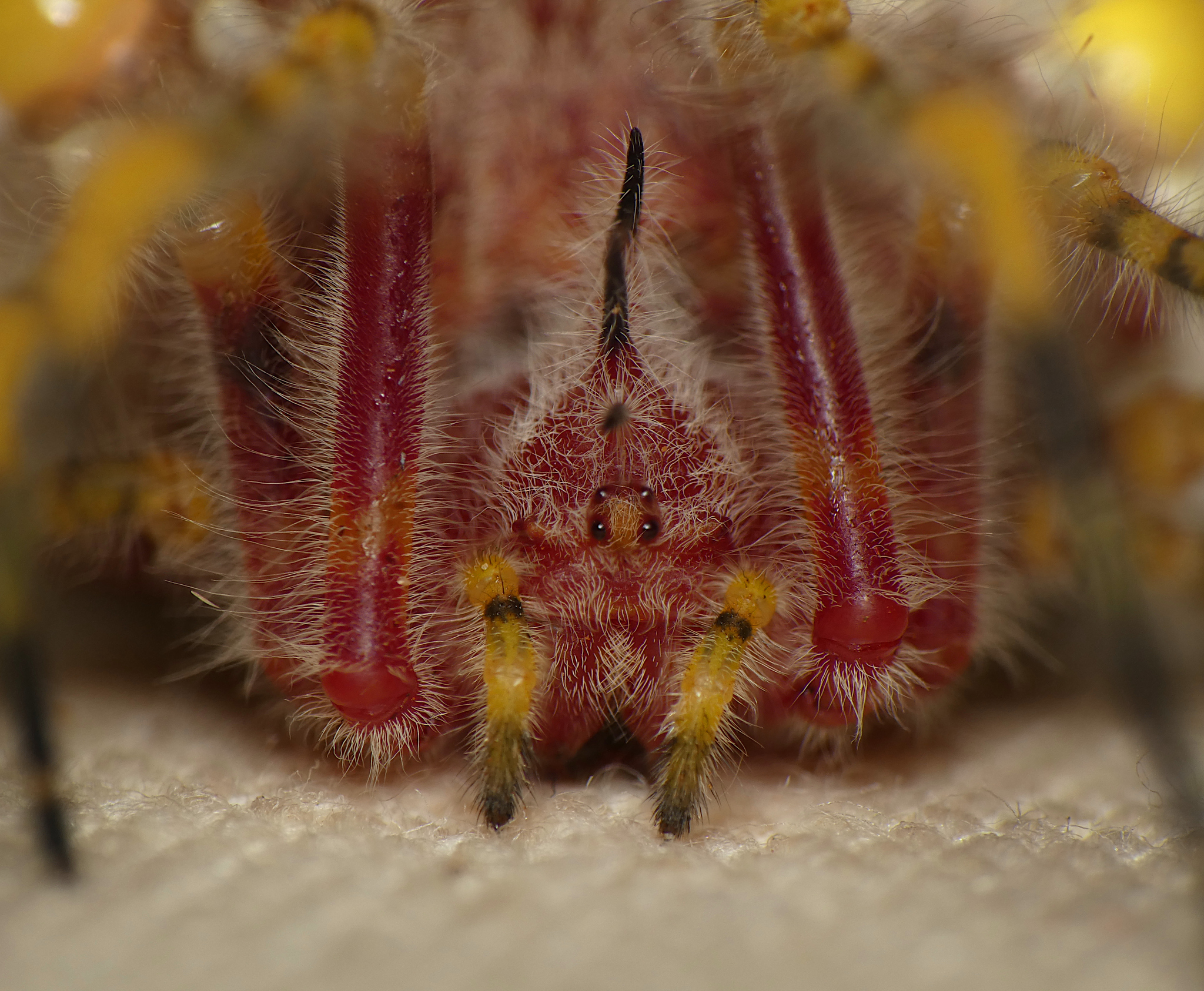
C. longipes
- Cladomelea akermani Hewitt, 1923 – South Africa
- Cladomelea debeeri Roff & Dippenaar-Schoeman, 2004 – South Africa
- Cladomelea longipes (O. Pickard-Cambridge, 1877) – Cameroon, DR Congo, Zimbabwe, South Africa (type species)
- Cladomelea ornata Hirst, 1907 – Central Africa
