= Taczanowskia waska =

Scientific classification
- Kingdom: Animalia
- Phylum: Arthropoda
- Subphylum: Chelicerata
- Class: Arachnida
- Order: Araneae
- Infraorder: Araneomorphae
- Family: Araneidae
- Genus: Taczanowskia
- Species: T. waska

Binomial name
- Taczanowskia waska Díaz-Guevara, Bentley & Dupérré, 2026

Species of spider

Taczanowskia waska is a species of spider, first formally described in 2026. Discovered in Ecuador, it is known for having growths on its exoskeleton that mimic the signs of Cordyceps infection.

== Behavior ==
Rather than spinning a web, T. waska plays dead and then seizes passing prey with its front legs.

== Discovery ==
Naturalist Alexander Griffin Bentley discovered the spider in 2025, while leading a tour group for the conservation organization Waska Amazonia. After he posted photographs of the specimen to iNaturalist, users identified it as a member of the genus Taczanowskia, and David Ricardo Díaz-Guevara of the Ecuadorian Instituto Nacional de Biodiversidad identified it as a new species; arachnologist Nadine Dupérré subsequently located another specimen, collected in Bolivia in 1903, in the holdings of a museum in Germany.
