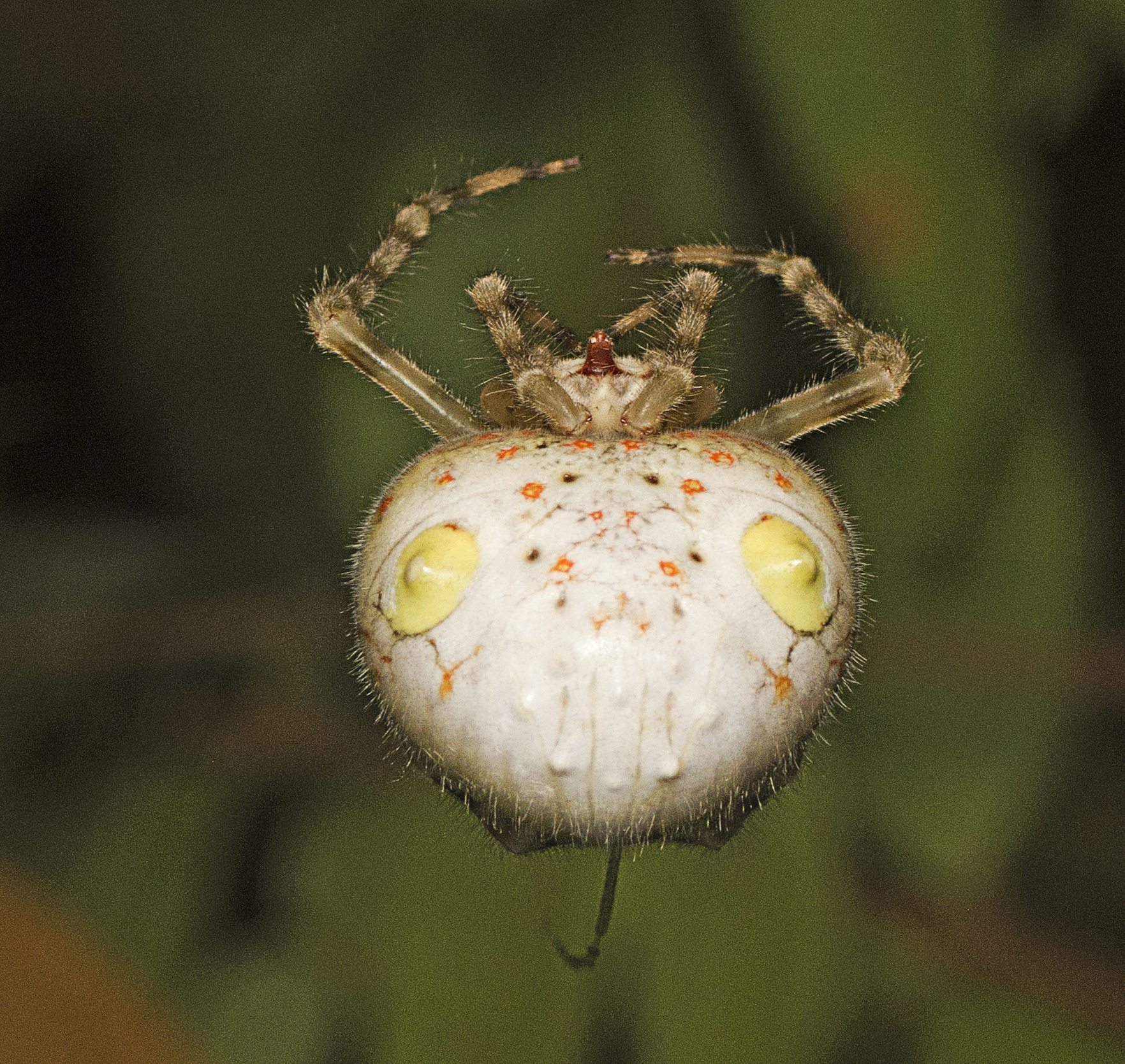
- Ordgarius magnificus, Manyung, Queensland

Scientific classification
- Kingdom: Animalia
- Phylum: Arthropoda
- Subphylum: Chelicerata
- Class: Arachnida
- Order: Araneae
- Infraorder: Araneomorphae
- Family: Araneidae
- Genus: Ordgarius
- Species: O. magnificus

Binomial name
- Ordgarius magnificus (Rainbow, 1897)
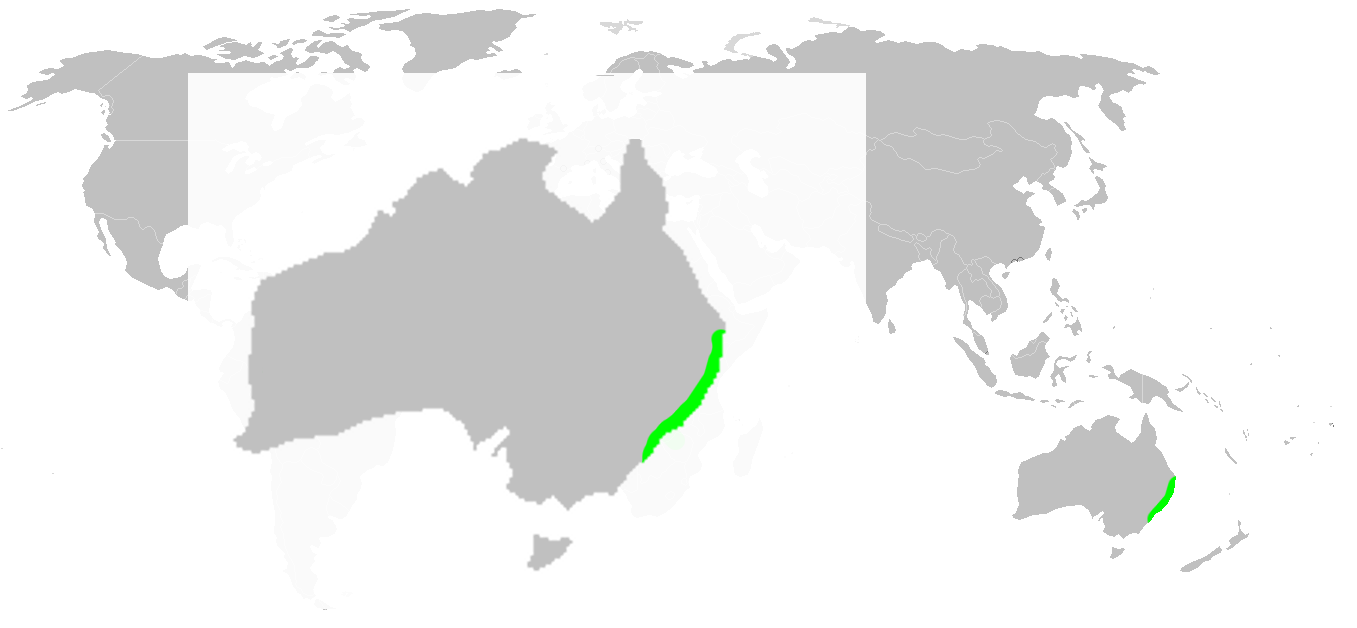

= Ordgarius magnificus =

Species of spider

Ordgarius magnificus, the magnificent spider, is a bolas spider in the family Araneidae. It is endemic to forests along the Australian east coast.

== Description ==
Females are up to 14 mm long and almost as wide; males reach only 2 mm. Females are creamy-white with a pattern of pink and yellow spots on the abdomen, and a crown of white and reddish tubercles on the head.

== Habits ==
They live in trees or tall shrubs, rarely less than 2 m above the ground. The easiest way to find them is to search for clusters of large, brown egg-sacs suspended among foliage; the spider will be found nearby, at day sheltering in a retreat made from rolled leaves and silk.

Like all bolas spiders, the female attracts male moths with an airborne pheromone. Once a moth approaches, the spider senses it coming due to vibration sensitive hairs on its outstretched legs. It is then caught with a sticky globule that is swung at the prey.

The egg-sacs are up to 5 cm long; one spider produces up to nine sacs per season, each with several hundred eggs.
