= Aranoethra =

Scientific classification
- Kingdom: Animalia
- Phylum: Arthropoda
- Subphylum: Chelicerata
- Class: Arachnida
- Order: Araneae
- Infraorder: Araneomorphae
- Family: Araneidae
- Subfamily: Cyrtarachninae s.l.
- Genus: Aranoethra; Butler, 1873

Type species
- A. cambridgei (Butler, 1873)

Species
- A. butleri Pocock, 1900 – West Africa; A. cambridgei (Butler, 1873) – West, Central Africa

Genus of spiders

Aranoethra is a genus of African orb-weaver spiders first described by Arthur Gardiner Butler in 1873. As of November 2026 it contains only two species.
