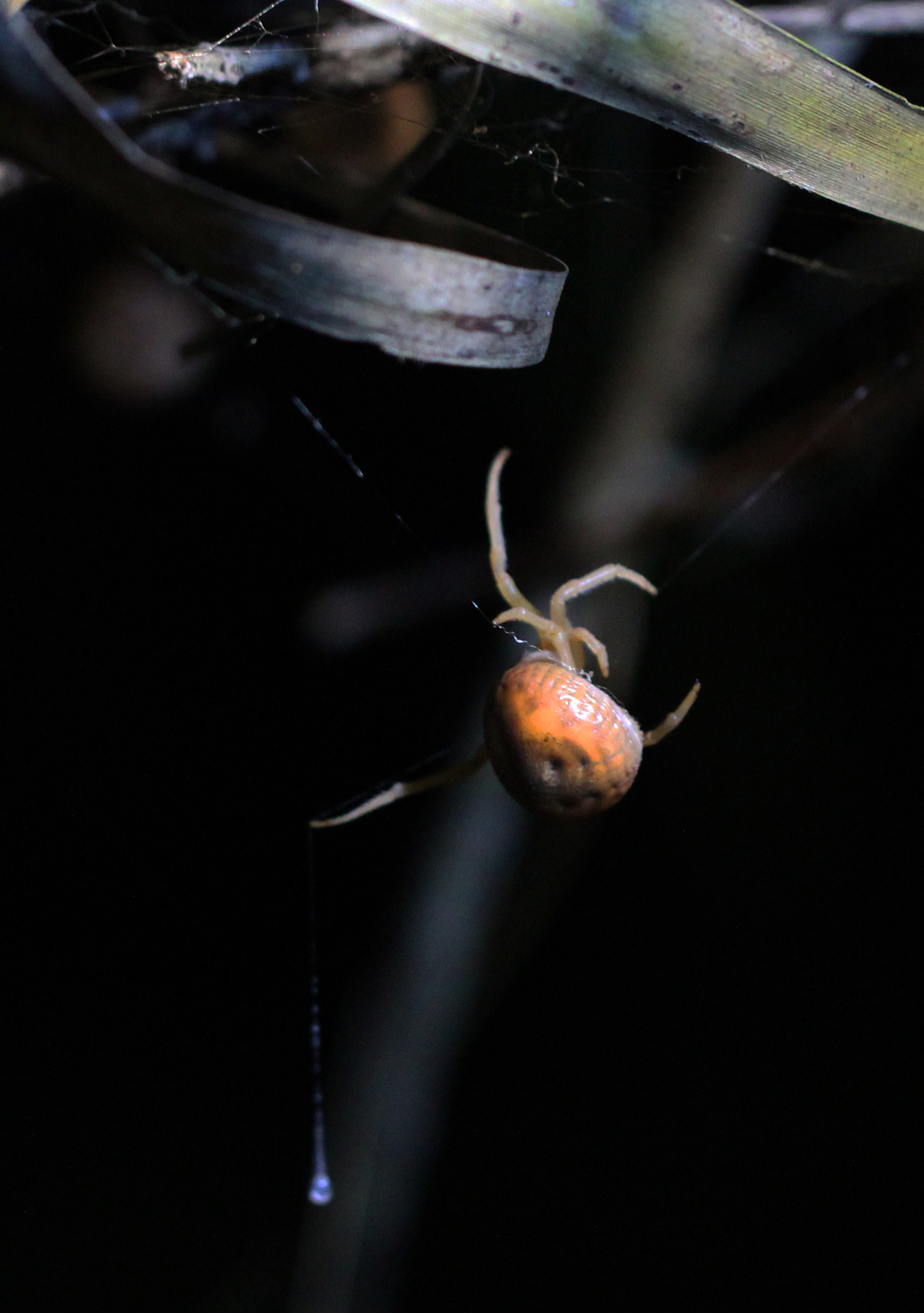

Scientific classification
- Domain: Eukaryota
- Kingdom: Animalia
- Phylum: Arthropoda
- Subphylum: Chelicerata
- Class: Arachnida
- Order: Araneae
- Infraorder: Araneomorphae
- Family: Araneidae
- Genus: Mastophora
- Species: M. bisaccata

Binomial name
- Mastophora bisaccata (Emerton, 1884)

= Mastophora bisaccata =

Species of spider

Mastophora bisaccata is a species of orb weaver in the spider family Araneidae. It is also known as Mastaphora obesa. It is found in the United States and Mexico. Like all known species of the genus Mastophora, adult females are bolas spiders, capturing their prey with one or more sticky drops at the end of a single line of silk rather than in a web. Males and juvenile females capture their prey directly with their legs.
