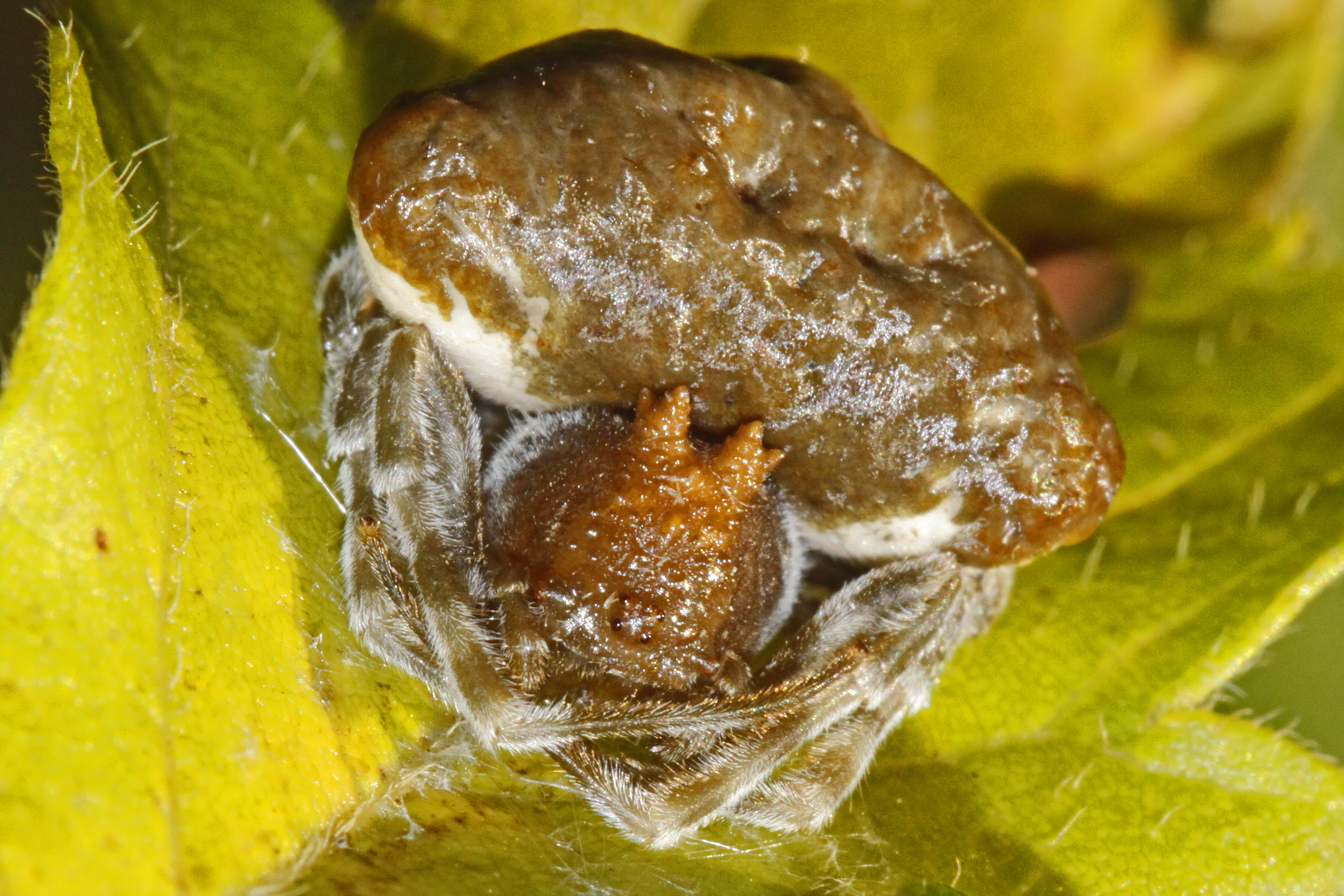

Scientific classification
- Domain: Eukaryota
- Kingdom: Animalia
- Phylum: Arthropoda
- Subphylum: Chelicerata
- Class: Arachnida
- Order: Araneae
- Infraorder: Araneomorphae
- Family: Araneidae
- Genus: Mastophora
- Species: M. phrynosoma

Binomial name
- Mastophora phrynosoma Gertsch, 1955

= Mastophora phrynosoma =

Species of spider

Mastophora phrynosoma is a species of orb weaver in the spider family Araneidae. It is found in the United States. Like all known species of the genus Mastophora, adult females are bolas spiders, capturing their prey with one or more sticky drops at the end of a single line of silk rather than in a web. Males and juvenile females capture their prey directly with their legs.
