= Taczanowskia =

Scientific classification
- Kingdom: Animalia
- Phylum: Arthropoda
- Subphylum: Chelicerata
- Class: Arachnida
- Order: Araneae
- Infraorder: Araneomorphae
- Family: Araneidae
- Subfamily: Cyrtarachninae s.l.
- Genus: Taczanowskia; Keyserling, 1879

Type species
- T. striata Keyserling, 1879

Species
- 5, see text

Genus of spiders

Taczanowskia is a genus of orb-weaver spiders first described by Eugen von Keyserling in 1879. Contrary to the common name of the family, spiders of the genus Taczanowskia do not build webs and are furtive hunters, deceiving their prey by producing sex pheromones that attract male moths, and catching their prey by using a pair of enlarged claws at the tip of their anterior legs.

In August 2025, a new species, T. waska was discovered in Ecuador. It mimics the appearance of a spider attacked by Gibellula, a genus of parasitic fungus. It was confirmed a new species in March 2026.

== Species ==
As of March 2026 it contains eight species from South America and Mexico:

- Taczanowskia gustavoi Ibarra-Núñez, 2013 – Mexico
- Taczanowskia mirabilis Simon, 1897 – Bolivia, Brazil
- Taczanowskia onowoka Jordán, Domínguez-Trujillo, & Cisneros-Heredia, 2021 – Ecuador
- Taczanowskia sextuberculata Keyserling, 1892 – Colombia, Brazil
- Taczanowskia striata Keyserling, 1879 (type) – Peru, Brazil, Argentina
- Taczanowskia trilobata Simon, 1897 – Brazil
- Taczanowskia waska Díaz-Guevara, Bentley, and Dupérré, 2026 - Ecuador, Bolivia
- Taczanowskia yasuni Díaz-Guevara, Macías-Tulcán & Galvis, 2024 – Ecuador
