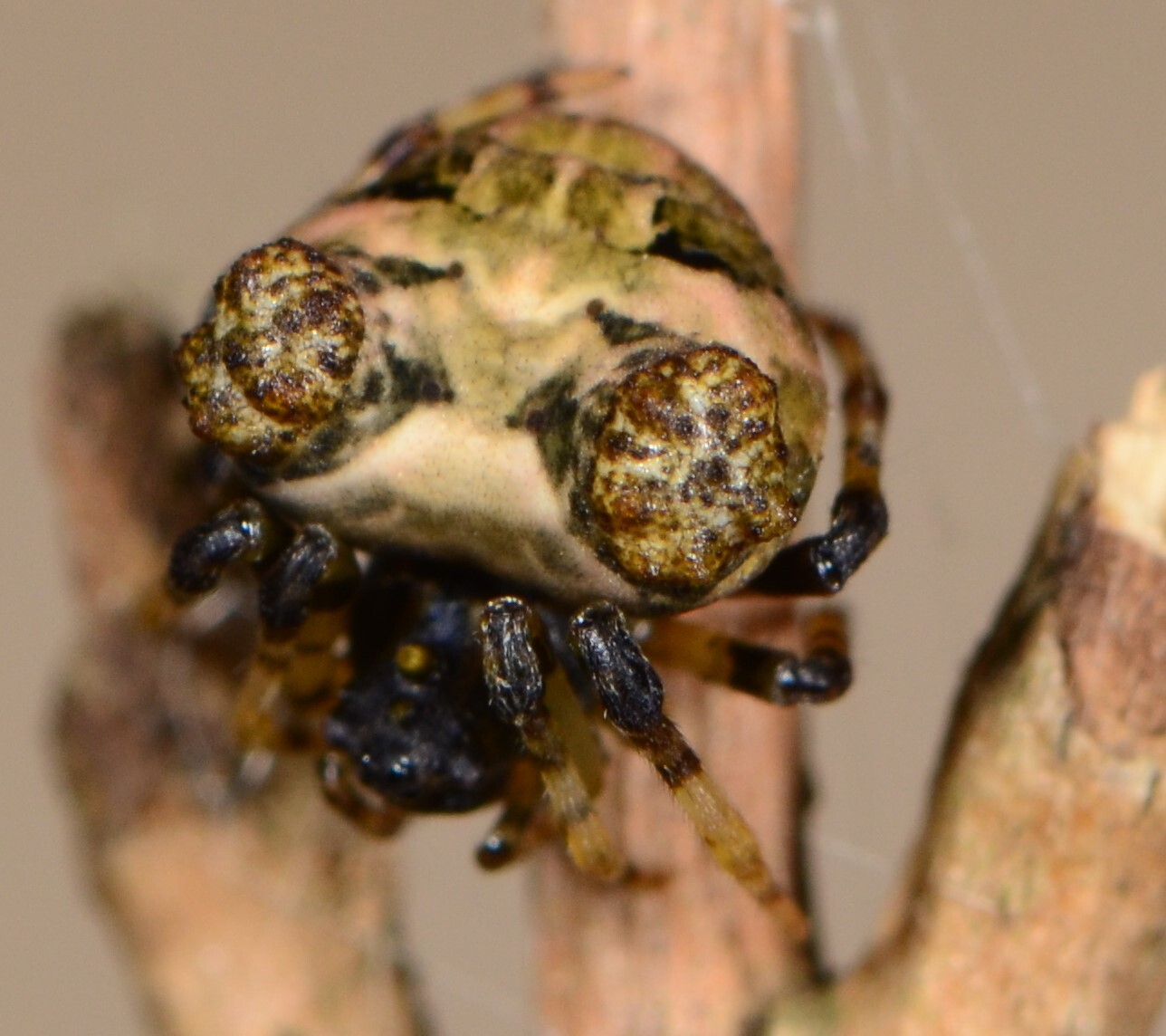
- A. seydeli
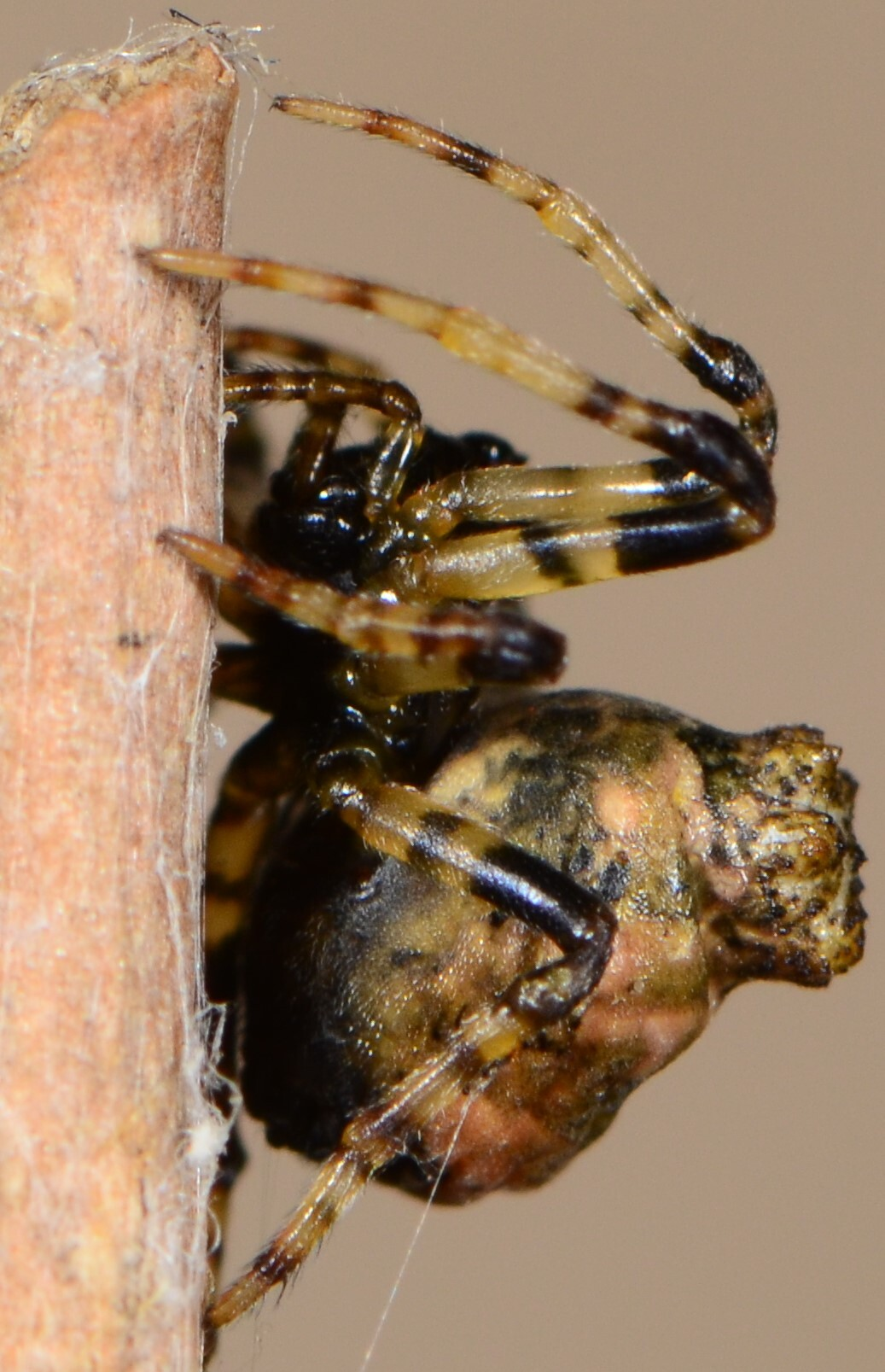
- A. seydeli

Scientific classification
- Kingdom: Animalia
- Phylum: Arthropoda
- Subphylum: Chelicerata
- Class: Arachnida
- Order: Araneae
- Infraorder: Araneomorphae
- Family: Araneidae
- Genus: Acantharachne; Tullgren, 1910

Type species
- A. cornuta Tullgren, 1910

Species
- 8, see text

= Acantharachne =

Genus of spiders

Acantharachne is a genus of African orb-weaver spiders first described by Albert Tullgren in 1910.

== Taxonomy ==
The genus Acantharachne was erected by Albert Tullgren in 1910 for the species Acantharachne cornuta. There was already a genus of echinoderms with a name differing only in the last letter, Acantharachna, so in 1929, Embrik Strand put forward a replacement name, Acantharanea. However, as the spelling was different, even if only by one letter, replacement was unnecessary.

== Etymology ==
The genus name is a combination of Latin acanthus "thorn, spine" and Ancient Greek arachne "spider".

== Species ==
As of October 2026, this genus includes eight species:

- Acantharachne cornuta Tullgren, 1910 – Tanzania
- Acantharachne giltayi Lessert, 1938 – DR Congo, Madagascar
- Acantharachne lesserti Giltay, 1930 – Congo
- Acantharachne madecassa Emerit, 2000 – Madagascar
- Acantharachne milloti Emerit, 2000 – Madagascar
- Acantharachne psyche Strand, 1913 – Central Africa
- Acantharachne regalis Hirst, 1926 – Cameroon, Congo
- Acantharachne seydeli Giltay, 1935 – DR Congo, South Africa
