= Mimicry in vertebrates =

Use of mimicry as an anti-predator adaptation in animals with backbones

In evolutionary biology, mimicry in vertebrates is mimicry by a vertebrate of some model (an animal, not necessarily a vertebrate), deceiving some other animal, the dupe. Mimicry differs from camouflage as it is meant to be seen, while animals use camouflage to remain hidden. Visual, olfactory, auditory, biochemical, and behavioral modalities of mimicry have been documented in vertebrates.

There are few well-studied examples of mimicry in vertebrates. Still, many of the basic types of mimicry apply to vertebrates, especially among snakes. Batesian mimicry is rare among vertebrates but found in some reptiles (particularly snakes) and amphibians. Müllerian mimicry is found in some snakes, birds, amphibians, and fish. Aggressive mimicry is known in some vertebrate predators and parasites, while certain forms of sexual mimicry are distinctly more complex than in invertebrates.

== Classification ==
=== Defensive ===
==== Batesian ====
Batesian mimicry is a form of defense that allows a harmless species to mimic the appearance of a toxic, noxious, or harmful species to protect itself from predators. By mimicking the appearance of a harmful species, a predator is less likely to attack the species due to its awareness of the signal of warning color patterns. Batesian mimicry occurs in multiple vertebrates, but is less prevalent in mammals due to a relative rarity of well-marked harmful models. However, this form of mimicry is prevalent in snakes and frogs, where chemical defense has coevolved with distinct coloration. Still, mammals have evolved Batesian mimicry systems where particularly powerful or harmful models exist.

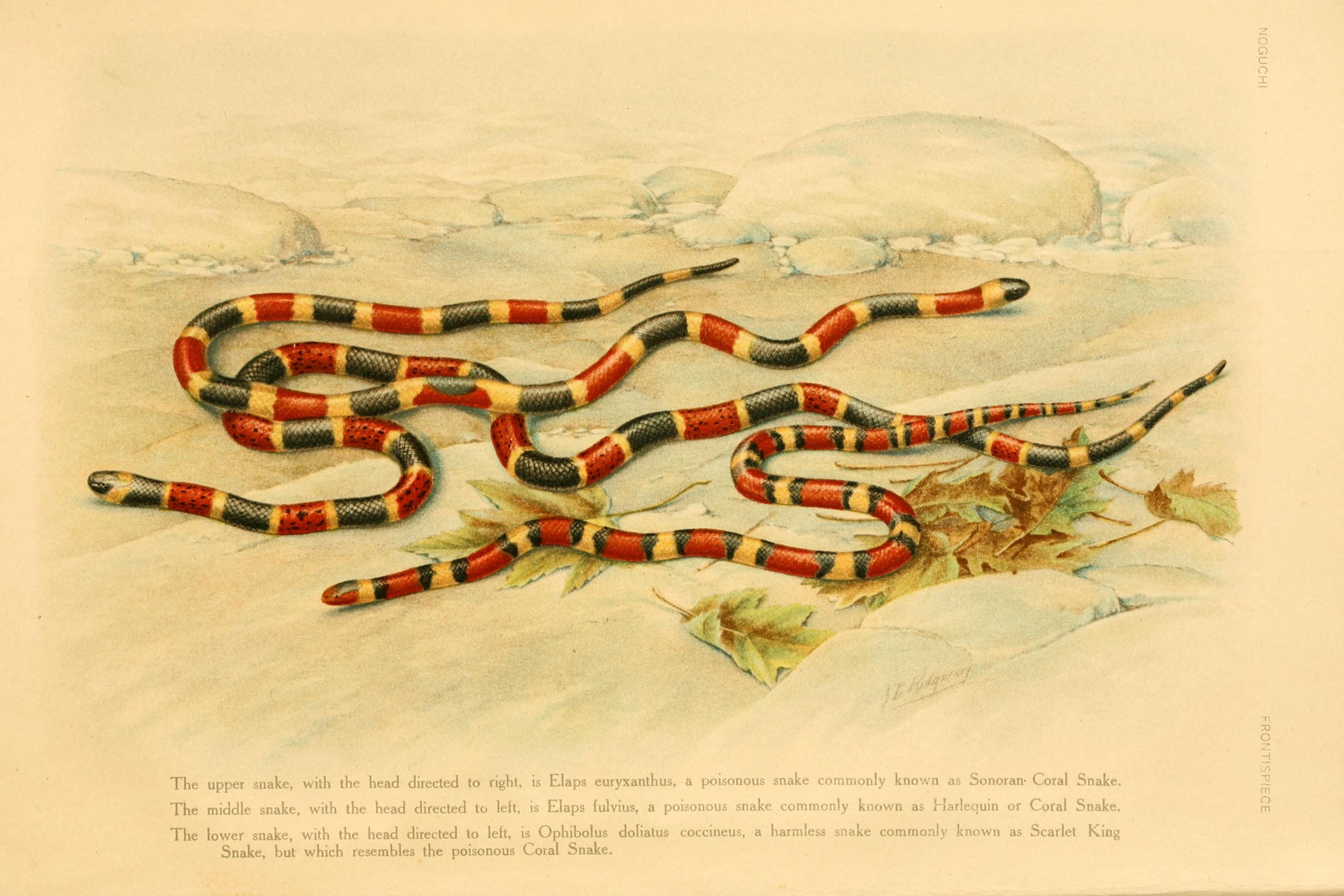
A venomous coral snake and some of its multiple nonvenomous mimic species

For example, Batesian mimicry may occur in cheetah cubs. They replicate the appearance of a sympatric species, the honey badger (Mellivora capensis). The honey badger has a white or silvery back with a black or brownish underbelly and grows to a body length of about three feet long and ten inches high. As cubs, cheetahs have the same reverse-countershading color pattern and are roughly the same size. Due to this conspicuous coloration, potential predators like lions and birds of prey are less likely to hunt cheetah cubs, as from a distance they appear to be honey badgers. Honey badgers make an effective model because their aggressive nature and glands on their tails that produce a noxious fluid enable them to deter predators up to 10x their size.

Batesian mimicry also occurs in the scarlet kingsnake. This species resembles the venomous coral snake, sharing a pattern of red, black, and yellow bands. Although the order of the color rings differ between the two snakes, from a distance a predator can easily mistake the scarlet kingsnake for its venomous model.

==== Müllerian ====
Müllerian mimicry is another form of defensive mimicry, except the system involves two or more species that are all toxic, noxious, or harmful. These species develop similar appearances to collectively protect against predators. This adaptation is said to have evolved due to the additive protection of many species that look the same and reliably have harmful defenses. That is to say, this mimicry system evolves convergently. If a predator is aware of the potential threat of one species, the predator will also avoid any species with a similar appearance, creating the Müllerian mimicry affect. Again, the relative lack of noxious models limits most examples to systems that involve reptiles or amphibians.

Müllerian mimicry is found in many pitvipers. All pit vipers are capable of delivering a life-threateningly venomous bite. In Asia, different species found throughout Asia have evolved separately to have a very similar appearance. Each species is found in different places in Asia, but have the same green coloration with reddish tail tip. These shared colorations are warnings signals for predators. Because a predator is aware of these warning signals, it will avoid all species with this color pattern. Species that benefit from this system include Trimeresurus macrops, T. purpureomaculatus, Trimeresurus septentrionalis, T. flavomaculatus and T. hageni.

Müllerian mimicry is also found in a ring of poisonous frog species in Peru. The mimic poison frog (Dendrobates imitator) mimics 3 similarly poisonous frogs of the same genus that live in different areas. These are D. variabilis, D. fantasticus, and D. ventrimaculatus. D. imitator can replicate the different appearances of all 3 species with color patterns ranging from black spots with yellow back and bluish green limbs, larger black spots with yellow outline, and black linear spots with yellow and bluish green outline.

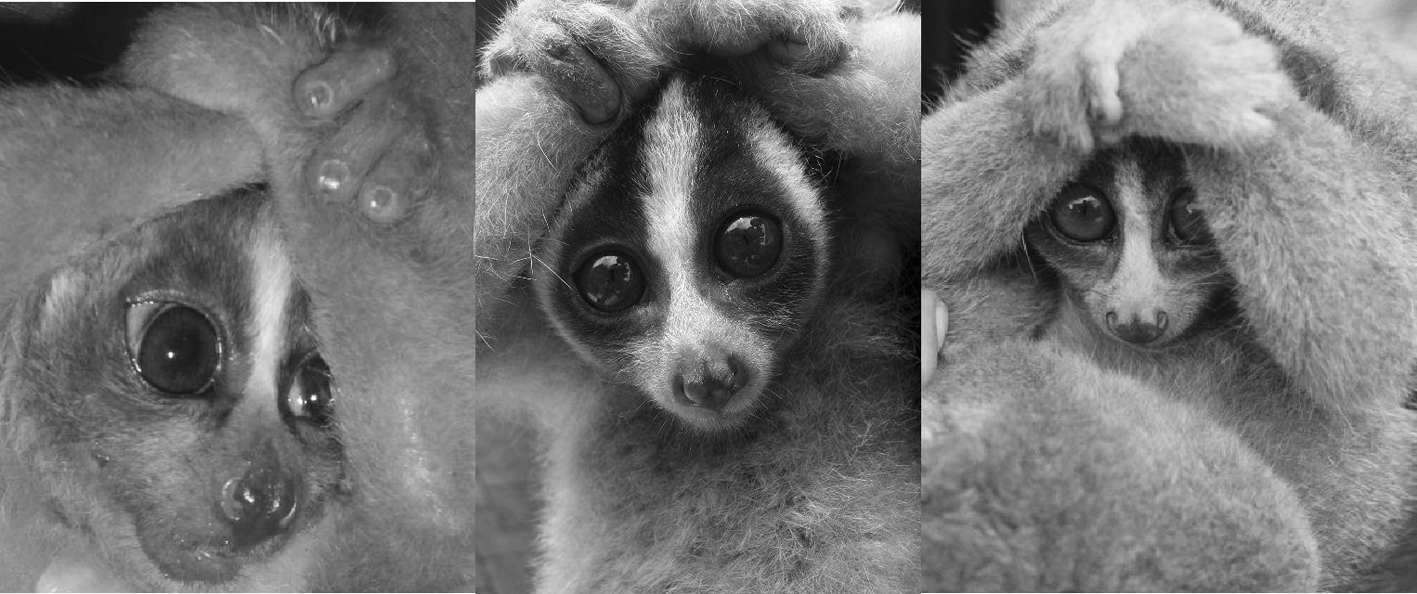
Examples of the defensive posture and facial markings of the slow loris, which activates the individual's venom glands and may imitate a cobra hood.

The slow loris is one of the few known venomous mammals, and appears to use Müllerian mimicry for protection. It is hypothesized that this venom may have allowed it to develop a system of Müllerian mimicry with the Indian cobra. Slow lorises appear to look similar to the cobras with "facial markings undeniably akin to the eyespots and accompanying stripes of the spectacled cobra". Dark contrasting dorsal stripes are also apparent in both species, helping to confuse predators from above. When in aggressive encounters, slow lorises will make a grunting noise that mimics the hiss of a cobra. This example of Müllerian mimicry is likely unique to vertebrates due to its multiple modalities: biochemical, behavioral, visual, and auditory. Since the cobra is undoubtedly more dangerous to predators (and prey, as the loris eats predominantly fruits, gums, and insects), it is unclear if the benefit from this system is mutual; Still, both species are dangerous in their own right, and can therefore most accurately be classified as Müllerian.

=== Aggressive ===
Aggressive mimicry is a form of mimicry, opposite in principle to defensive mimicry, that occurs in certain predators, parasites or parasitoids. These organisms benefit by sharing some of the characteristics of a harmless species in order to deceive their prey or host. Most examples of aggressive mimicry involve the predator employing a signal to lure its prey towards it under the promise of food, sex, or other rewards—much like the idiom of a wolf in sheep's clothing.

==== In predators ====
Some predators pretend to be prey or a third-party organism that the prey beneficially interacts with. In either situation, the mimicry increases the predator's chances of catching its prey.

One form of predatory mimicry, lingual luring, involves wriggling the tongue to attract prey, duping them into believing the tongue is a small worm, an unusual case of a vertebrate mimicking an invertebrate. In the puff adder Bitis arietans, lingual luring only occurs in the act of attracting amphibian prey, suggesting that puff adders distinguished between prey types when selecting how to perform a display of aggressive mimicry.

Another form of aggressive mimicry is caudal luring, in which the tail is waved to mimic prey. By mimicking invertebrate larva, the predator attracts prey of small vertebrates such as frogs, lizards, and birds. Male puff adders have longer, more obvious-looking tails. Sidewinder rattlesnakes, puff adders, lanceheads, and multiple other ambush-predatory snakes use caudal luring to attract prey.

Complicated forms of aggressive mimicry have also been observed in fish, creating a system that resembles Batesian mimicry. The false cleanerfish, Aspidontus taeniatus, is a fin-eating blenny that has evolved to resemble a local species of cleaner wrasse, Labroides dimidiatus, which engages in mutualistic cleaning with larger fish. By closely mimicking the coloration and the cleaner fish's distinctive dancing display, false cleanerfish are able to remain in close quarters with large predatory reef fish, and gain access to victims during foraging.

Some aggressive mimics switch rapidly between aggressive mimicry and defensive behavior depending on whether they are in the presence of a prey or a potential predator. For example, the sidewinder rattlesnake ceases aggressive behavior upon the arrival of a predatory toad and begins species-typical defensive displays.

==== Host-parasite ====
Host-parasite mimicry is a form of aggressive mimicry in which a parasite mimics its own host. Brood parasitism is a common form of parasitic aggressive mimicry that occurs in vertebrates, with cuckoos being a notable example. Brood parasite mothers will surrender their offspring to be raised by another organism, of either the same or a different species, unbeknownst to the other organism. This allows the progeny to be nurtured without energy expenditure or parental care by the true parent.

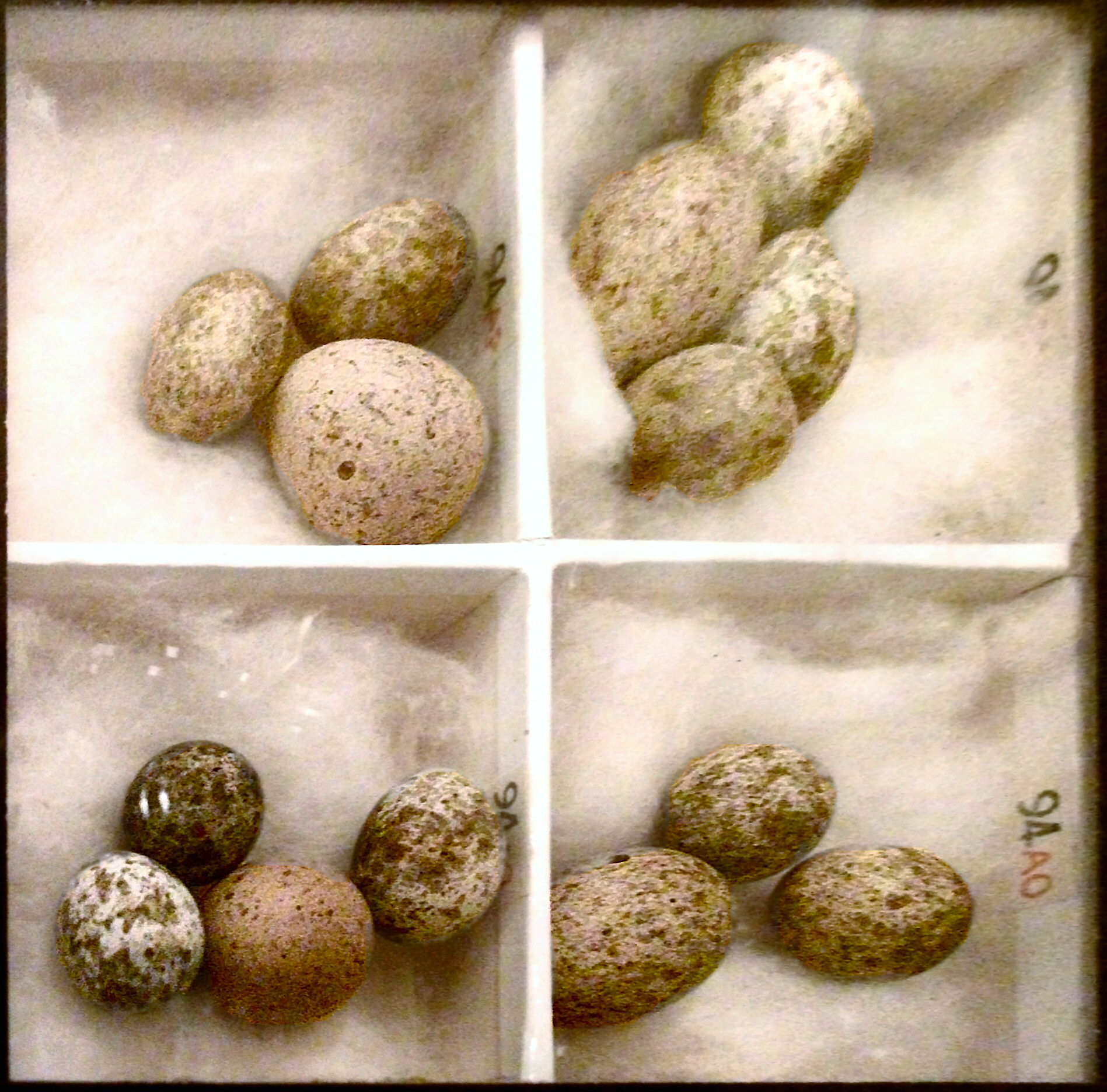
Examples of parasitized broods containing a cuckoo egg

Cuckoos are brood parasites that lay their eggs to match the color and pattern of their host's own eggs. Different species of cuckoo hatchlings have been known to mimic the acoustic sound, such as during begging, and appearance of the host offspring. Unlike most vertebrates that perform aggressive mimicry, certain brood parasitic birds display signals of two distinct modalities at the same time. For example, Horsfield's bronze cuckoo nestlings have been found to employ both acoustic and visual sensory modalities at the same time to increase efficiency and success of their mimicry.

However, host-parasite systems are not always as precise. Great spotted cuckoos are brood parasites that lay eggs that can successfully dupe other birds such as the magpie, pied starling, and black crow, despite having different egg color, egg size, and offspring features. It is hypothesized that these differences in characteristic have evolved after the mimicry system due to genetic isolation, as the appearance of eggs laid by European an African great spotted cuckoos are different.

Evidence also exists for other forms of parasitic mimicry in vertebrates. One such form is interspecific social dominance mimicry, a type of social parasitism where a subordinate species (usually determined by size) evolves over time to mimic its dominant ecological competitor, thereby competing with its previously socially dominant opponent. One such example is found in the tyrant flycatcher family, in which different birds of similar appearance exist from six different genera. Smaller-bodied species from four genera have been found to mimic the appearance of the larger species of the other two genera, suggesting that an avian mimicry complex has contributed to convergent evolution, providing a competitive advantage in the same ecological niche.

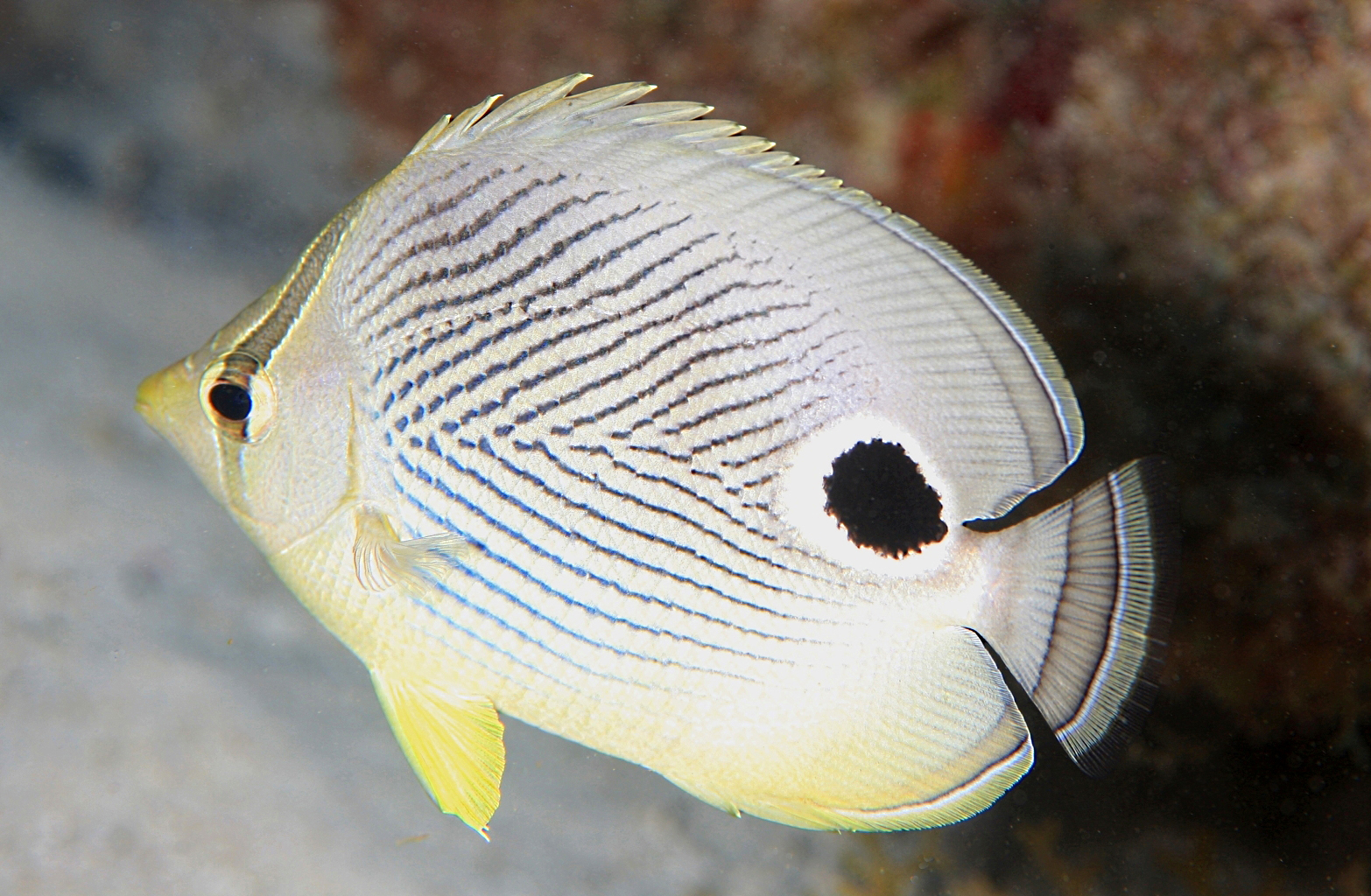
The four-eyed butterfly fish is an automimic, the pattern on its flank resembling an eye.

=== Automimicry ===
Automimicry is a type of mimicry that occurs within a single species, in which an individual mimics either a different member of its own species or a different part of its own body. In some cases, it is considered a form of Batesian mimicry, and is exhibited by a wide variety of vertebrates. Many of the basic strategies automimics use in invertebrates is repeated in vertebrates, such as eyespots.

==== Sexual ====
In sexual mimicry, an organism mimics the behaviors or physical traits of the opposite sex within its species. Spotted hyenas are one of the few vertebrate examples. In spotted hyenas, females have a pseudo-penis, which is highly erectile clitoral tissue, as well as a false scrotum. Females have evolved to mimic or exceed the testosterone levels of males This is advantageous because it lends females heightened aggression and dominance over the males in a highly competitive environment. Alternatively, it may have evolved for the advantage it bestows upon sexually indistinguishable cubs, which experience a high level of female-targeted infanticide.

Another example is in flat lizards, where some males imitate female coloring to sneak around more dominant males and achieve copulation with females.

==== Anatomical ====
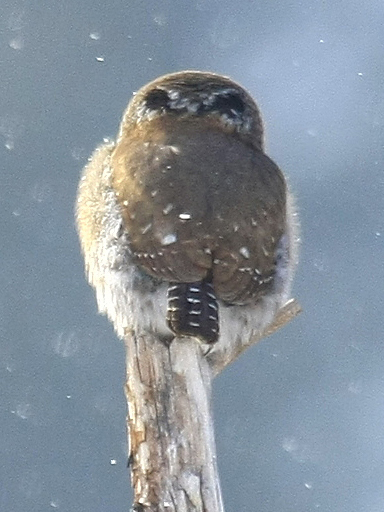
The eyespots of a pygmy owl

Some vertebrates species self-mimic their own body parts, through the use of patterns or actual anatomy. Two widespread examples of this are eyespots and false heads, both of which can misdirect, confuse, or intimidate potential predators.

Eyespots are a form of automimicry in which an organism displays false eyes on a different part of its body, considered to be an aversion to predators who believe the prey animal has spotted them or is behaving aggressively, even when they are actually facing the other direction and unaware. In the case of attack, eyespots may also redirect damage away from the true head. Eyespots can be seen across the vertebrate taxa, from the four-eyed butterfly fish to pygmy owls.

False-head mimicry occurs when an organism displays a different body part that has evolved to look like a head, achieving the same scare tactic as eyespots, and also protecting the vulnerable and important real head. For example, the rubber boa coil up and hide their heads, instead displaying their tails, which look morphologically like their heads, in a defensive behavior.

== Evolution ==
Mimicry, in vertebrates or otherwise, is widely hypothesized to follow patterns of directional selection. However, it is argued that, while positive evolution might stabilize mimic forms, other evolutionary factors like random mutation create mimetic forms simply by coincidence. Vertebrate evolution systems often operate under unique selective pressures, resulting in the different quantitative and qualitative characteristics we observe between mimicry in vertebrates and other animals.

The primary difference between mimicry in vertebrates and in insects is a decreased diversity and frequency. The 50,000 extant vertebrates are dwarfed by the over 1 million known invertebrates. Vertebrates seem to have multiple barriers to precise mimicry that invertebrates do not. Due to the drastic difference in average body size between the two phyla, vertebrates tend to mimic other living things, while invertebrates are much better able to mimic inanimate objects. Large size makes any imprecision much more noticeable to the naked eye, slowing or preventing the evolution of mimicry. However, when a potential prey is highly noxious, as in snakes, predators that avoid even poor mimics gain a strong selective advantage; whereas insects, rarely able to deliver enough toxin to threaten vertebrate predators, would need precise mimicry to avoid detection.

The assumption of scarcity in vertebrate mimetic resemblances is largely limited due to human perception. Humans are hyper-perceptive to visual mimicry systems, and find these the most abundant. However, olfactory, biochemical, and even electroreceptive forms of mimicry are likely to be much more common than currently accounted for.
