= Aggressive mimicry =

Deceptive mimicry of a harmless species by a predator

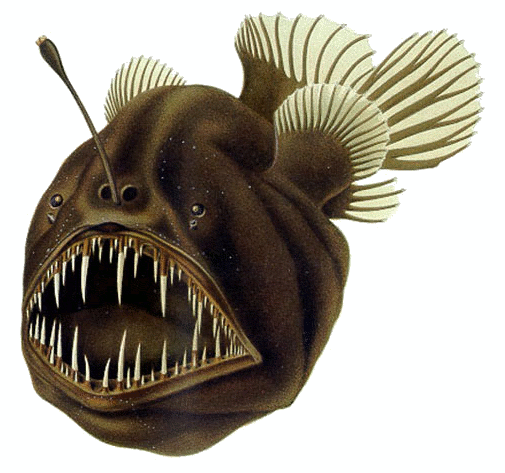
The humpback anglerfish uses a modified dorsal spine as a fishing rod with a bioluminescent lure to attract and capture prey.

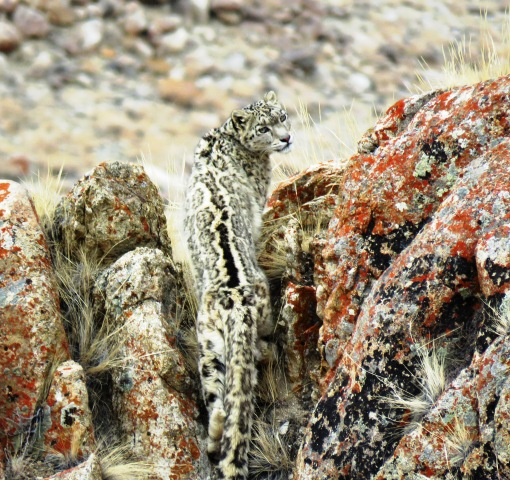
A camouflaged predator: snow leopard in Ladakh. The distinction between aggressive mimicry and predator camouflage depends on the signal given to the prey, not easily determined.

Aggressive mimicry is a form of mimicry in which predators, parasites, or parasitoids share similar signals, using a harmless model, allowing them to avoid being correctly identified by their prey or host. Zoologists have repeatedly compared this strategy to a wolf in sheep's clothing. In its broadest sense, aggressive mimicry could include various types of exploitation, as when an orchid exploits a male insect by mimicking a sexually receptive female (see pseudocopulation), but will here be restricted to forms of exploitation involving feeding. For example, indigenous Australians who dress up as and imitate kangaroos when hunting would not be considered aggressive mimics, nor would a human angler, though they are undoubtedly practising self-decoration camouflage. Treated separately is molecular mimicry, which shares some similarity; for instance a virus may mimic the molecular properties of its host, allowing it access to its cells. An alternative term, Peckhamian mimicry, has been suggested (after George and Elizabeth Peckham), but it is seldom used. (Note: Pasteur (1982) describes the term as redundant and states that there are many different forms of aggressive mimicry. The term was used earlier by Bates (1862) and Kirby & Spence (1823).)

Aggressive mimicry is opposite in principle to defensive mimicry, where the mimic generally benefits from being treated as harmful. The mimic may resemble its own prey, or some other organism which is beneficial or at least not harmful to the prey. The model, i.e. the organism being 'imitated', may experience increased or reduced fitness, or may not be affected at all by the relationship. On the other hand, the signal receiver inevitably suffers from being tricked, as is the case in most mimicry complexes.

Aggressive mimicry often involves the predator employing signals which draw its potential prey towards it, a strategy which allows predators to simply sit and wait for prey to come to them. The promise of food or sex are most commonly used as lures. However, this need not be the case; as long as the predator's true identity is concealed, it may be able to approach prey more easily than would otherwise be the case. In terms of species involved, systems may be composed of two or three species; in two-species systems the signal receiver, or "dupe", is the model.

In terms of the visual dimension, the distinction between aggressive mimicry and camouflage is not always clear. Authors such as Wickler have emphasized the significance of the signal to its receiver as delineating mimicry from camouflage. However, it is not easy to assess how 'significant' a signal may be for the dupe, and the distinction between the two can thus be rather fuzzy. Mixed signals may be employed: aggressive mimics often have a specific part of the body sending a deceptive signal, with the rest being hidden or camouflaged.

== Contrast with defensive mimicry ==
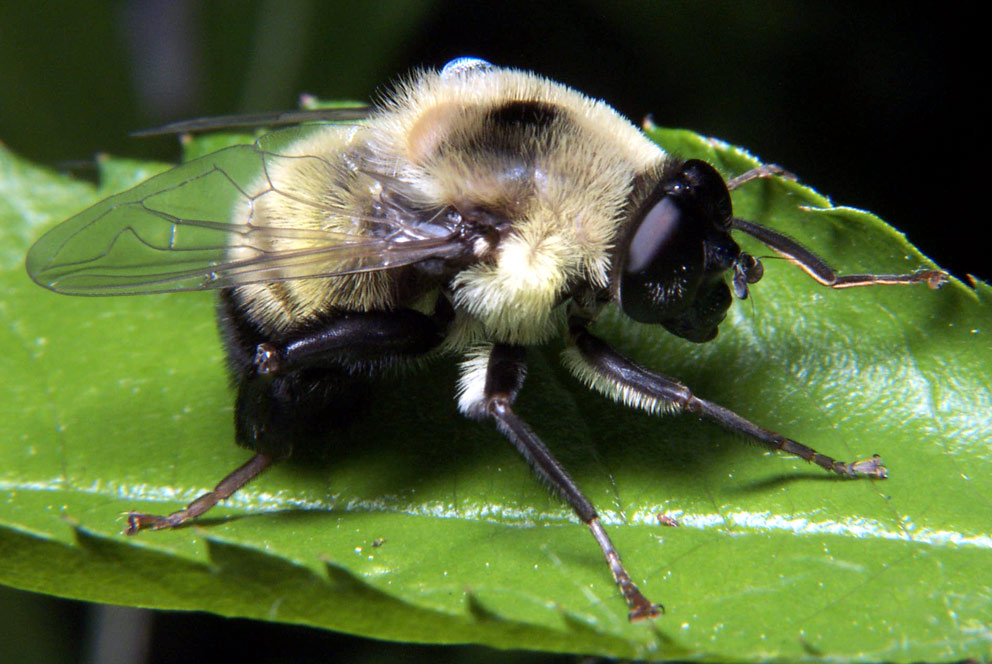
Defensive Batesian mimics, like this bumblebee-mimicking hoverfly, are the antithesis of aggressive mimics.

Aggressive mimicry stands in semantic contrast with defensive mimicry, where it is the prey that acts as a mimic, with predators being duped. Defensive mimicry includes the well-known Batesian and Müllerian forms of mimicry, where the mimic shares outward characteristics with an aposematic or harmful model. In Batesian mimicry, the mimic is modeled on a dangerous (usually unpalatable) species, while in Müllerian mimicry both species are harmful, and act as comimics, converging on a common set of signals and sharing the burden of 'educating' their predators. Included in defensive mimicry is the lesser known Mertensian mimicry, where the mimic is more harmful than the model, and Vavilovian mimicry, where weeds come to mimic crops through unintentional artificial selection. In defensive mimicry, the mimic benefits by avoiding a harmful interaction with another organism that would be more likely to take place without the deceptive signals employed. Harmful interactions might involve being eaten, or pulled out of the ground as a weed. In contrast, the aggressive mimic benefits from an interaction that would be less likely to take place without the deception, at the expense of its target.

Aggressive mimicry compared to a defensive form, Batesian mimicry. The mechanism is often called "Wolf in sheep's clothing". The model for an aggressive mimic can be a harmless species, in which case the 3 roles are separate, or the model can be the prey itself, in which case there are only 2 species involved.

== Classification ==
=== Luring prey ===
In some cases the dupe is lured toward the mimic. This involves mimicry of a resource that is often vital to the prey's survival (or more precisely, the survival of its genes) such as nutrition or a mate. If the bait offered is of little value to prey they would not be expected to take such a risk. For example, in all known cases of sexual signal mimicry it is always the male sex that is deceived (in fact, it has been suggested that females of some species have evolved mimicry as a strategy to avoid unwanted matings). In these cases the predator need not move about foraging for prey, but may simply stay still and allow prey to come to it. Some studies suggest that the northern shrike (Lanius excubitor) sings in winter often imitating small passerines that may be preyed upon when lured within reach. There has been one report of a margay using mimicry of the cry of an infant pied tamarin to try to lure an adult tamarin within striking distance.

==== Appearance of food ====
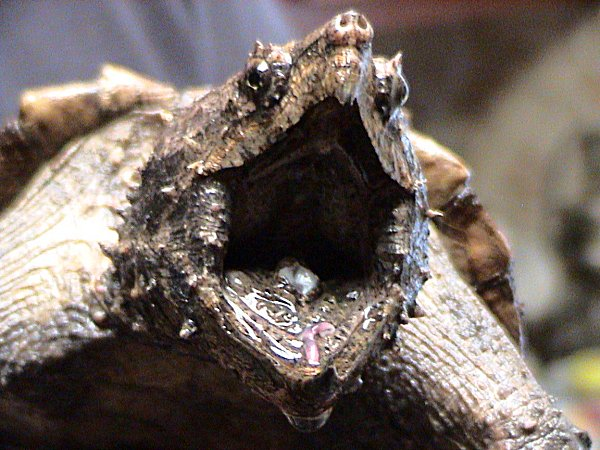
The alligator snapping turtle uses its tongue to lure fish.

Many aggressive mimics use the promise of nourishment as a way of attracting prey. The alligator snapping turtle (Macrochelys temminckii) is a well-camouflaged ambush predator. Its tongue bears a conspicuous pink extension that resembles a worm and can be wriggled around; fish that try to eat the "worm" are themselves eaten by the turtle. Similarly, some snakes employ caudal luring (using the tail) or lingual luring (using the tongue) to entice small vertebrates into striking range.

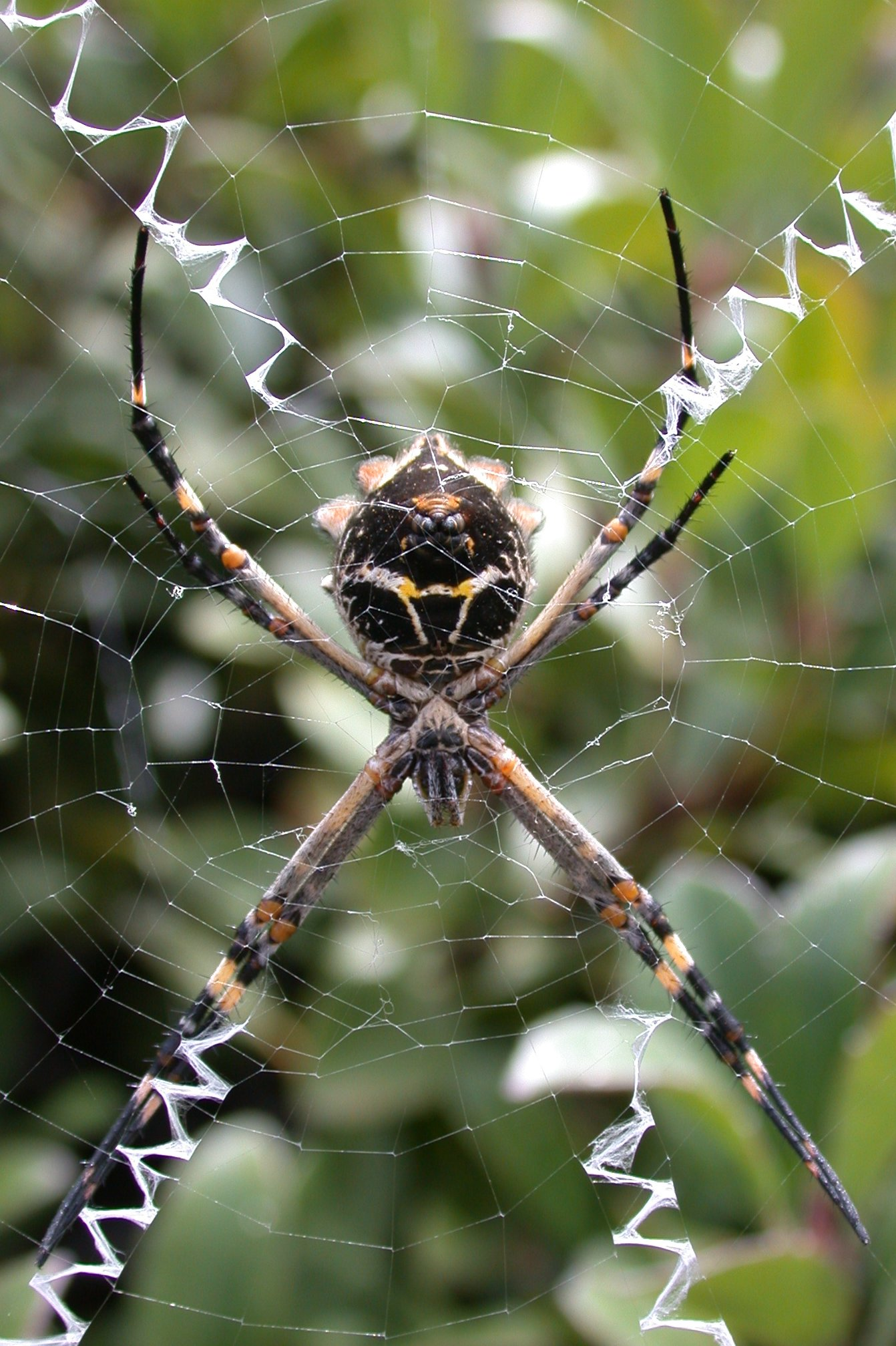
Argiope argentata and its web

Aggressive mimicry is common amongst spiders, both in luring prey and stealthily approaching predators. One case is the golden orb weaver (Nephila clavipes), which spins a conspicuous golden coloured web in well-lit areas. Experiments show that bees are able to associate the webs with danger when the yellow pigment is not present, as occurs in less well-lit areas where the web is much harder to see. Other colours too were learned and avoided, but bees seemed least able to effectively associate yellow pigmented webs with danger. Yellow is the colour of many nectar bearing flowers, however, so perhaps avoiding yellow is not worthwhile. Another form of mimicry is based not on colour but pattern. Species such as Argiope argentata employ prominent patterns in the middle of their webs, such as zigzags. These may reflect ultraviolet light, and mimic the pattern seen in many flowers known as nectar guides. Spiders change their web day to day, which can be explained by bees' ability to remember web patterns. Bees are able to associate a certain pattern with a spatial location, meaning the spider must spin a new pattern regularly or suffer diminishing prey capture.

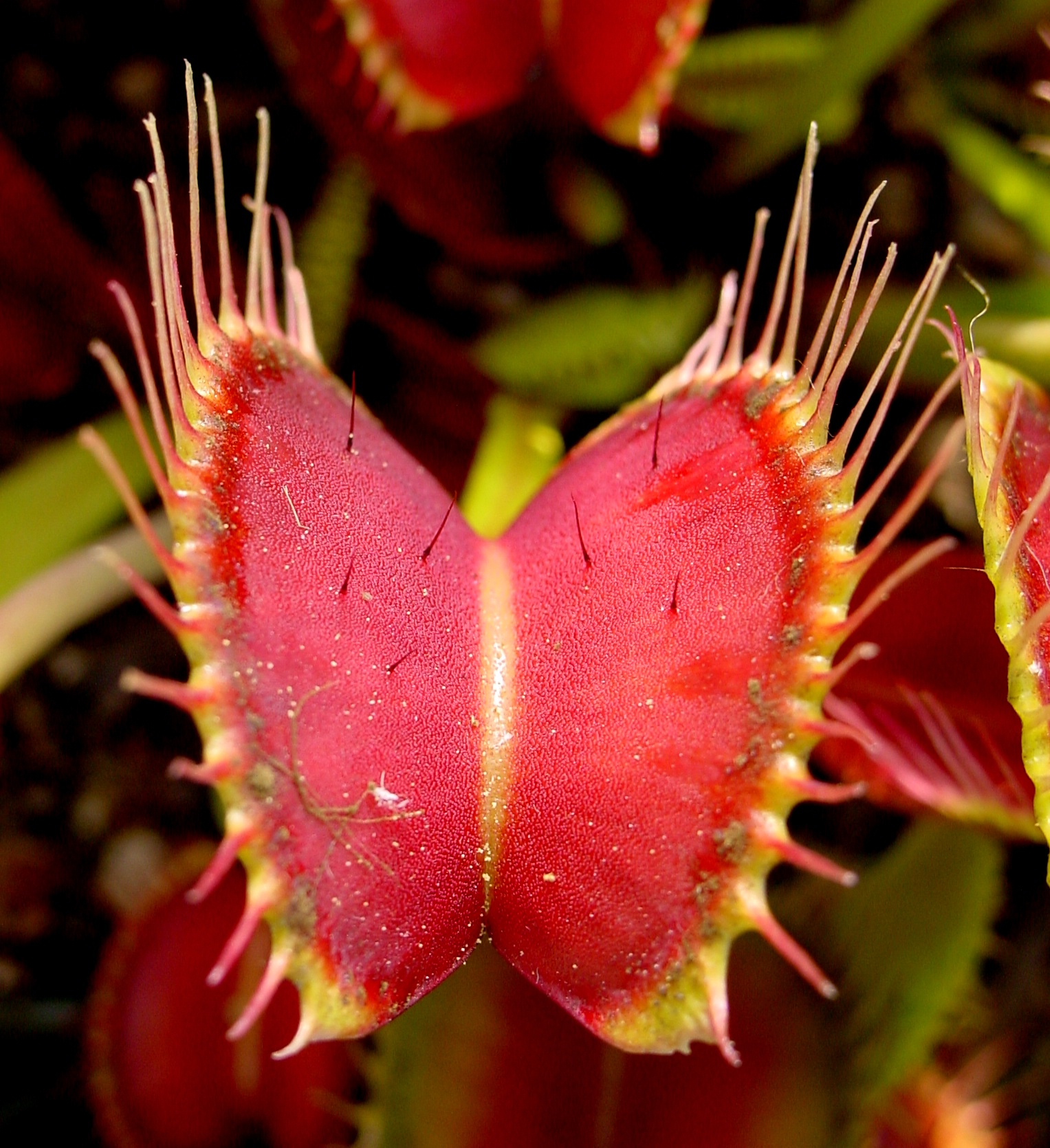
The bright leaves of the Venus flytrap (Dionaea muscipula) attract insects in the same way as flowers.

Spiders can be the prey of aggressive mimics. The assassin bug Stenolemus bituberus preys on spiders, entering their web and plucking its silk threads until the spider approaches. This vibrational aggressive mimicry matches a general pattern of vibrations which spiders treat as prey, having a similar temporal structure and amplitude to leg and body movements of typical prey caught in the web.

Larvae of the ground beetle Epomis move their mandibles one after another to lure amphibians toward them and then prey on them. Their body structure allows them to bite and feed on the amphibians even when they are ingested by larger prey such as frogs.

Most mimicry in plants is not aggressive, but some carnivorous plants may be able to increase their rate of capture through mimicry. For example, some have patterns in the ultraviolet region of the electromagnetic spectrum that could attract insects.

=== Bipolar mimicry systems ===
Mimicry systems involving only two species are known as bipolar. Only one bipolar arrangement is possible here, namely where the dupe is itself the model. (Note: The only theoretical possibilities outside this scope are a) a two species system with a model-mimic - perhaps a predator pretending to be a sleeping or dead predator (this stretches the usual scope of mimicry somewhat); and b) a cannibalistic species where a cannibalistic organism individual mimics another species.) There are two such variants on this arrangement of mimic imitating its target. In one case, Kirbyan mimicry, the model is the host of a brood parasite. In the other case, termed Batesian-Wallacian mimicry after Henry Walter Bates and Alfred Russel Wallace, the model is the prey species.

==== Kirbyan or brood parasite mimicry ====
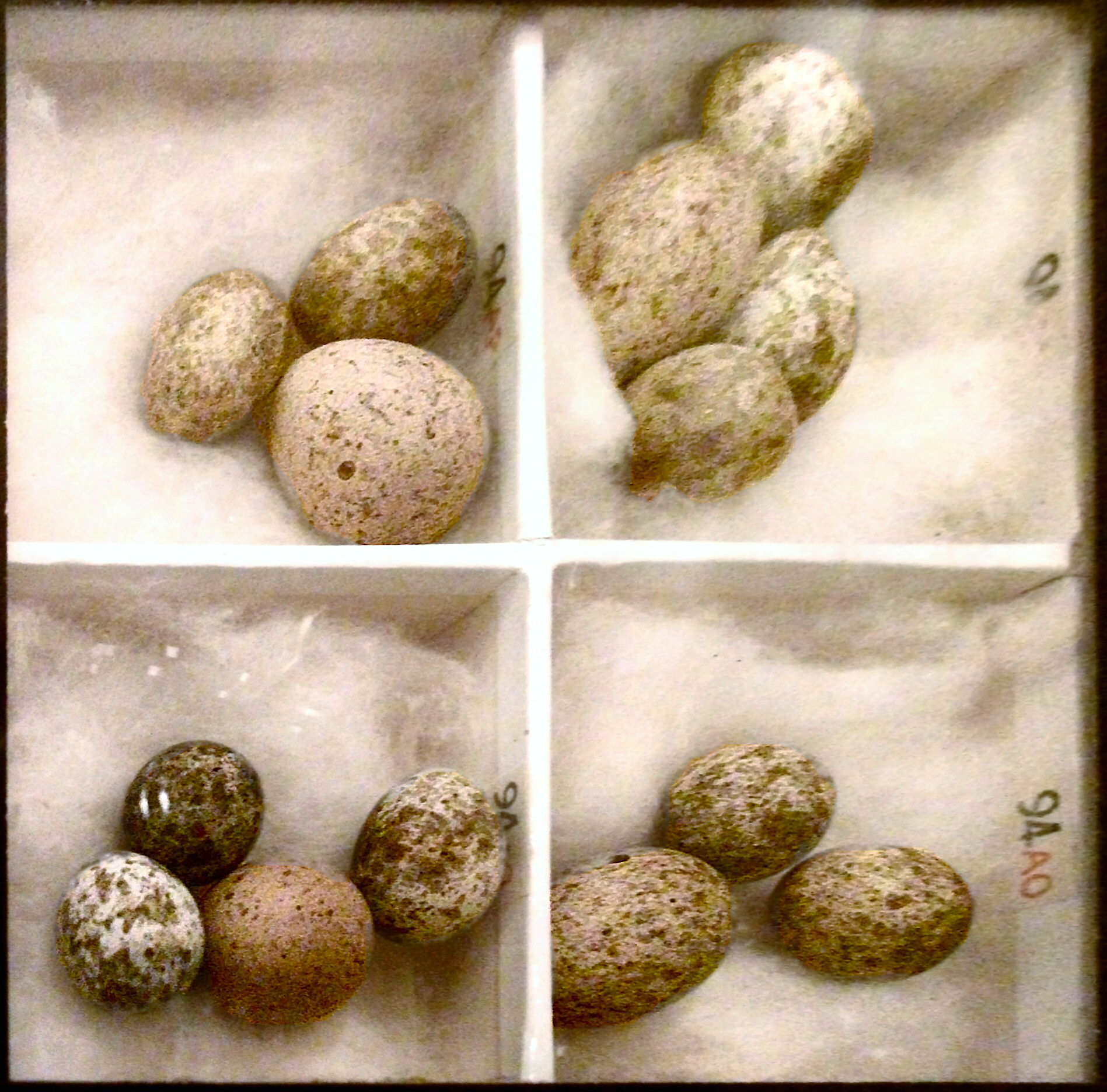
Brood parasitism: four clutches of reed warbler eggs, each containing one (larger) cuckoo egg

Host-parasite mimicry is a situation where a parasite mimics its own host. As with mimicry of the female sex outlined previously, only two species are involved, the model and mimic being of the same species. Brood parasitism, a form of kleptoparasitism where the mother has its offspring raised by another unwitting organism, is one such situation where host-parasite mimicry has evolved. Georges Pasteur terms this form of aggressive-reproductive mimicry Kirbyan mimicry, after the English entomologist William Kirby, who noticed that the young of syrphid hoverflies are raised by bumblebees.

==== Batesian-Wallacian or prey mimicry ====
In Batesian-Wallacian mimicry, the model is a sexually receptive female, which provides a strong attractive effect on males. Some spiders use chemical rather than visual means to ensnare prey. Female bolas spiders of the genus Mastophora lure male moth-flies (Diptera, true flies that resemble moths) by producing analogues of the fly species' sex pheromones. Each species of spider appears to specialize in a particular species of prey in the family Psychodidae. Juveniles use their front pair of legs to capture prey, such as flies. Older spiders use a different strategy however, swinging a sticky ball known as a bolas suspended by a silk thread at moths. But both old and juvenile are able to lure prey via this olfactory signal; even young spiderlings have been shown to attract prey species.

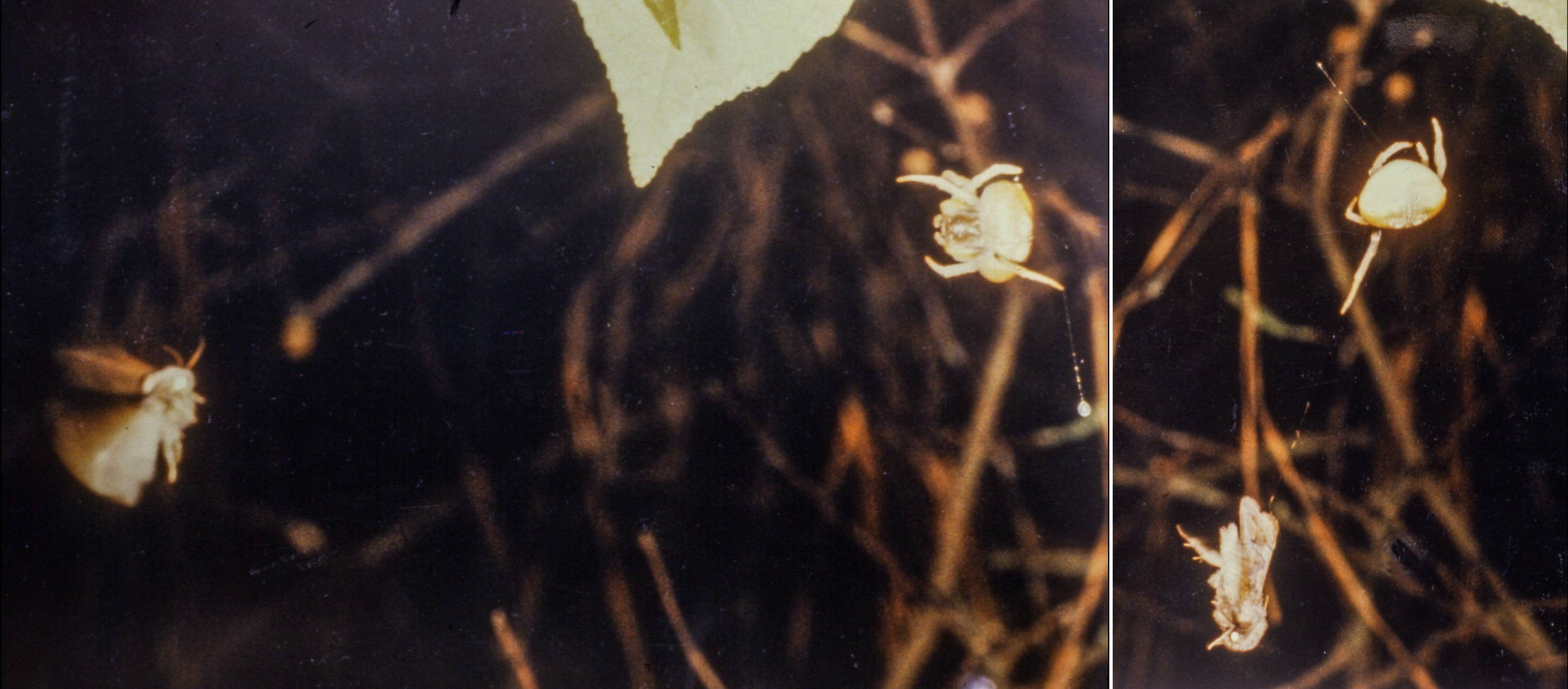
Mastophora spider holding its bolas with a leg, attracting and capturing a male moth

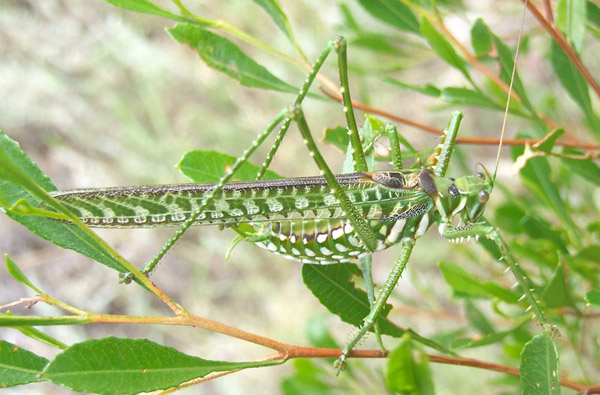
The spotted predatory katydid (Chlorobalius leucoviridis) is an acoustic aggressive mimic of cicadas.

Chlorobalius leucoviridis mimicry of Kobonga oxleyi
Kobonga oxleyi cicada song with reply clicks from a Chlorobalius leucoviridis

Chlorobalius leucoviridis mimicry of Pauropsalta sp.
Pauropsalta sp. "Sandstone" song with reply clicks from a Chlorobalius leucoviridis

Female fireflies of the genus Photuris emit the same light signals that females of the genus Photinus use as a mating signal. Male fireflies from several different genera are attracted to these mimics, and are subsequently captured and eaten. Female signals are based on that received from the male, each female having a repertoire of signals matching the delay and duration of the female of the corresponding species. This mimicry may have evolved from non-mating signals that have become modified for predation.

The katydid Chlorobalius leucoviridis of inland Australia is capable of attracting male cicadas of the Tribe Cicadettini by imitating the species-specific reply clicks of sexually receptive female cicadas. This example of acoustic aggressive mimicry is similar to the Photuris firefly case in that the predator's mimicry is remarkably versatile – playback experiments show that C. leucoviridis is able to attract males of many cicada species, including Cicadettine cicadas from other continents, even though cicada mating signals are species-specific. The evolution of versatile mimicry in this species may have been facilitated by constraints on song evolution in duetting communication systems in which reply signals are recognizable only by their precise timing in relation to the male song (<< 100 ms reply latency).

=== Wicklerian-Eisnerian or cryptic aggressive mimicry ===
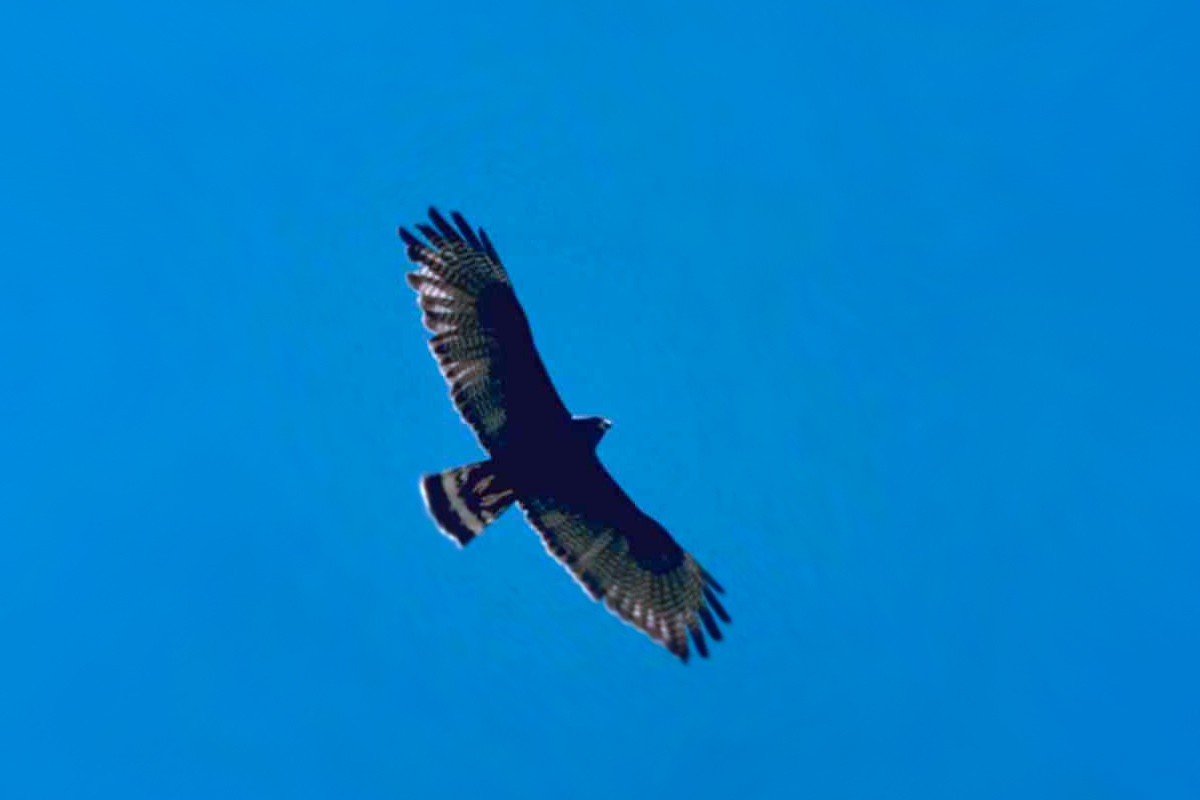
The zone-tailed hawk resembles the harmless turkey vulture in flight, but attacks other species.

The prey does not have to be attracted towards the predator for the predator to benefit: it is sufficient for the predator simply not to be identified as a threat. Wicklerian-Eisnerian mimics may resemble a mutualistic ally, or a species of little significance to the prey such as a commensal. For example, the hemipteran Arachnocoris berytoides resembles Faiditus caudatus, a spider commensal of ants.

In cryptic aggressive mimicry, the predator mimics an organism that its prey is indifferent to. This allows the predator to avoid detection until the prey are close enough for the predator to strike, effectively a form of camouflage. The zone-tailed hawk (Buteo albonotatus), which resembles the turkey vulture (Cathartes aura), may provide one such example. It flies amongst them, suddenly breaking from the formation and ambushing its prey. There is some controversy over whether this is a true case of mimicry.

=== Mimicry of cleaner fish ===
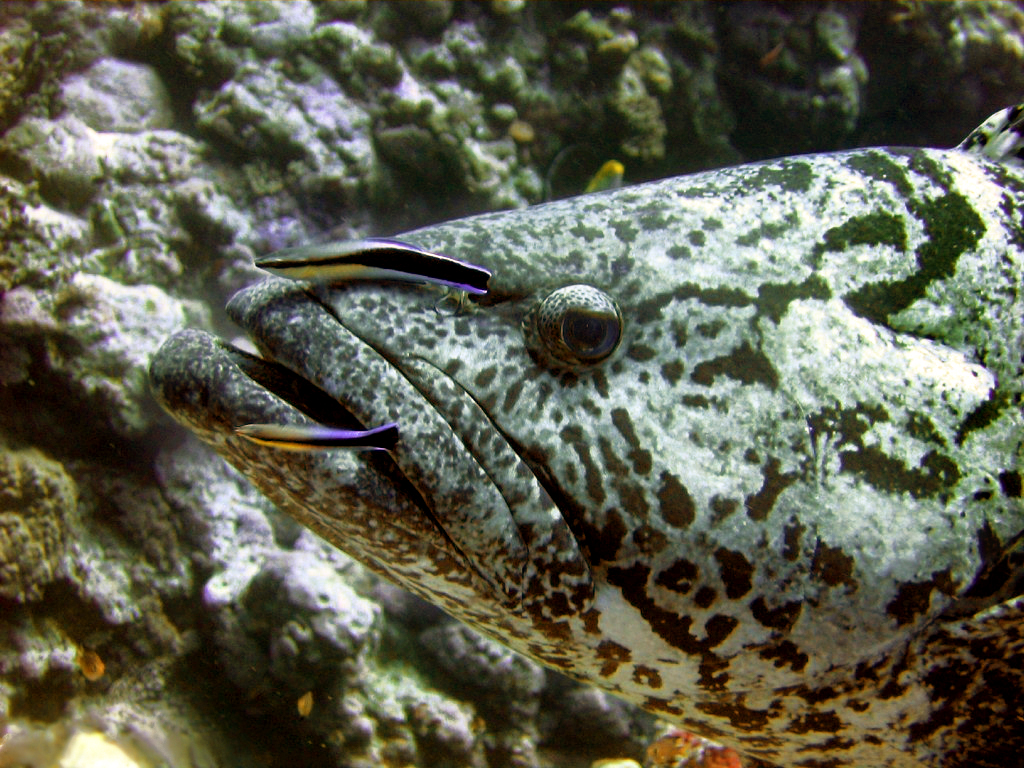
Two bluestreak cleaner wrasse cleaning a potato grouper, Epinephelus tukula

Mimicry of mutualistic species is seen in coral reef fish, where the models, certain cleaner fish, are greatly disadvantaged by the presence of the mimic. Cleaner fish are mutually beneficial to many other species, which allows them to eat their parasites and dead skin. Some allow the cleaner to venture inside their mouths and gill cavities to hunt these parasites. However, one species of cleaner, the bluestreak cleaner wrasse (Labroides dimidiatus), is the model of a mimic, the sabre-toothed blenny (Aspidontus taeniatus). The cleaner wrasse, shown in the image cleaning a grouper of the genus Epinephelus, resides in coral reefs in the Indian and the Pacific Oceans, and is recognised by other fishes who allow it to clean them. The blenny lives in the Indian Ocean and not only looks like the cleaner wrasse in terms of size and coloration, but even mimics the cleaner wrasse's 'dance'. Having fooled its prey into letting its guard down, the sabre-toothed blenny bites it, tearing off scales or pieces of fin. Fish grazed upon in this fashion learn to distinguish mimic from model, but because of the similarity between the two, they become much more cautious of the model as well, such that both are affected. Due to victims' ability to discriminate between foe and helper, the blennies have evolved close similarity, down to the regional level. Another aggressive mimic of the cleaner wrasse, the bluestriped fangblenny, has evolved an opioid-containing venom which dulls pain and lowers blood pressure, confusing the bitten host and giving the mimic time to escape.

=== Parasites mimicking host prey ===
Just as predators such as angler fish have a structure that lures prey, so some parasites mimic their host's natural prey, but with roles reversed; the parasite gets eaten by the host. This deception provides the parasite easy entry into the host, which they can then feed upon, allowing them to continue their life cycle.

One such case is a genus of mussel, Lampsilis, which feeds on the gills of fish in the larval stage of their development. Once they mature, they leave the fish as adult mollusc. Gaining entry into the host is not an easy task though, despite the fact that several hundred thousand larvae are released at once. This is especially the case in flowing water bodies such as streams, where they cannot lie on the substrate and wait to be taken up in the course of foraging. Female Lampsilis have evolved a special technique for delivering their offspring into a suitable host, however. Structures on the edge of the mantle are able to capture the interest of fish. Some resemble small fish themselves, with eye spots, a "tail" and horizontal stripes, and may even move in a similar fashion, as if facing the current (rheotaxis). When overshadowed by a fish, the larvae are forcefully expelled, becoming ecto-parasites on their unsuspecting host. Some species of Lampsilis, notably Lampsilis ovata, attract fish in the genus Micropterus, Villosa has fish-like mantle lures that attract predatory fish Percina.

Cercaria mirabilis, a trematode, has an especially large larval stage, a cercaria, which looks much like a small crustacean or mosquito larva. It mimics the locomotory behaviour of such animals, allowing it to be eaten by predaceous fish.

Another parasitic trematode example is seen in a terrestrial setting. Leucochloridium is a genus of flatworm (phylum Platyhelminthes) which matures in the intestine of songbirds. Their eggs pass out of the bird in the feces and are then taken in by Succinea, a terrestrial snail that lives in moist environments. The eggs develop into larvae inside this intermediate host, and then must find their way into the digestive system of a suitable bird. The problem here is that these birds do not eat snails, so the sporocyst must find some way of manipulating its future host into eating it. Unlike related species, these parasites are brightly colored and able to move in a pulsating manner. A sporocyst sac forces its way into the snail's eye stalks, and pulsates at high speed, enlarging the tentacle in the process. It affects the host's behaviour: the snail moves towards light, which it usually avoids. These combined factors make the sporocysts highly conspicuous, such that they are soon eaten by a hungry songbird. The snail then regenerates its tentacles, and Leucochloridium carries on with its life cycle.

== Wolf in sheep's clothing ==
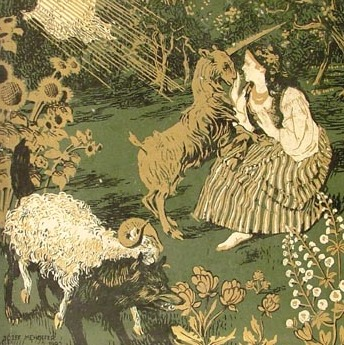
Wolf in Sheep's Clothing by Józef Mehoffer, 1903. Detail of album cover

Zoologists have repeatedly compared aggressive mimicry to the wolf in sheep's clothing strategy of fable, including when describing jumping spiders, lacewings, ant-mimicking aphids, hemipteran bugs mimicking chrysomelid beetles, bird-dropping spiders, orchid mantises, cichlid fish, and the zone-tailed hawk which flies with vultures, enabling it to approach terrestrial prey. These animals have evolved to deceive their prey by appearing as other prey, or like angler fish and snapping turtles lure the prey by appearing as the prey's prey.
