= Paraclinata nullarboris =

Scientific classification
- Kingdom: Animalia
- Phylum: Arthropoda
- Clade: Pancrustacea
- Class: Insecta
- Order: Hemiptera
- Suborder: Auchenorrhyncha
- Family: Cicadidae
- Genus: Paraclinata
- Species: P. nullarboris

Binomial name
- Paraclinata nullarboris Moulds & Marshall, 2025

Species of cicada

Paraclinata nullarboris is a species of cicada, also known as the Nullarbor wingbanger, in the family, Cicadidae, subfamily Cicadettinae and tribe Cicadettini. The species is endemic to Australia. It was described in 2025 by Australian entomologists Maxwell Sydney Moulds and David C. Marshall.

== Etymology ==
The specific epithet nullarboris refers to the species’ type locality.

== Description ==
The length of the forewing is 13–17 mm. Body length is 11–14 mm.

== Distribution and habitat ==
The species is known only from the arid Nullarbor Plain, in the vicinity of the Nullarbor Motel on the Eyre Highway, near the head of the Great Australian Bight, some 180 km east of the Western Australian border, in South Australia. The associated habitat is low saltbush shrubland.

== Behaviour ==
Adult males cling to the woody stems and dead branches of saltbush and other shrubs, emitting wing-snapping calls. The males are preyed on by spotted predatory katydids, which lure them by imitating the sounds of receptive females.
