= Faiditus cancellatus =

Scientific classification
- Domain: Eukaryota
- Kingdom: Animalia
- Phylum: Arthropoda
- Subphylum: Chelicerata
- Class: Arachnida
- Order: Araneae
- Infraorder: Araneomorphae
- Family: Theridiidae
- Genus: Faiditus
- Species: F. cancellatus

Binomial name
- Faiditus cancellatus (Hentz, 1850)

Species of spider

Faiditus cancellatus is a species of cobweb spider in the family Theridiidae. It is found in the United States, Canada, and Bahama Islands.
