= Mastophora extraordinaria =

Scientific classification
- Kingdom: Animalia
- Phylum: Arthropoda
- Subphylum: Chelicerata
- Class: Arachnida
- Order: Araneae
- Infraorder: Araneomorphae
- Family: Araneidae
- Genus: Mastophora
- Species: M. extraordinaria

Binomial name
- Mastophora extraordinaria Holmberg, 1876

Species of spider

Mastophora extraordinaria is a species of spider in the orb-weaver spider family Araneidae. It is found in South America (Brazil, Uruguay and Argentina). Like some other species of the genus Mastophora, adult females resemble bird droppings. Mastophora species, including M. extraordinaria, are "bolas spiders" – adult females capture their prey by using a sticky drop on the end of a single line which they swing at the target, usually a male moth attracted by the release of an analogue of the attractant sex pheromone produced by the female moth. Juveniles and adult males do not use a bolas, catching prey with their legs alone.

== Description ==
Herbert W. Levi described a female in 2003 (males were not known). The total length of the specimen's body was 12 mm (1/2 in). Other females ranged from 9.5 to 14 mm (3/8 to 9/16 in). The carapace was 4.8 mm (3/16 in) long and almost as wide in the thoracic region. The carapace was dark brown with a narrow white rim and had low tubercules. The abdomen was white with two black patches on the upper surface and a white square underneath. It had a pair of humps. The combined length of the patella and tibia of the first leg was a little more than the width of the carapace at 5 mm (3/16 in).

== Taxonomy ==
The species was first described in 1876 by E.L. Holmberg, an Argentine biologist. It is the type species of the genus. Its resemblance to a bird dropping was such that Holmberg first thought of using the specific name ornithocoproides ('resembling a bird dropping'), but replaced it by extraordinaria, noting its singular aspect. The genus has been placed in the broadly defined subfamily Cyrtarachninae, and within this in the informal group of mastophorines which includes the bolas spiders.

== Distribution ==
The species is found in southern Brazil, Uruguay and northern Argentina.
