= Mastophora dizzydeani =

Scientific classification
- Kingdom: Animalia
- Phylum: Arthropoda
- Subphylum: Chelicerata
- Class: Arachnida
- Order: Araneae
- Infraorder: Araneomorphae
- Family: Araneidae
- Genus: Mastophora
- Species: M. dizzydeani

Binomial name
- Mastophora dizzydeani Eberhard, 1981

Species of spider

Mastophora dizzydeani is a species of spider named after baseball player Dizzy Dean. Like all known species of the genus Mastophora, adult females are bolas spiders, capturing their prey with one or more sticky drops at the end of a single line of silk rather than in a web. Males and juvenile females capture their prey directly with their legs.

== See also ==
- List of organisms named after famous people (born 1900–1924)
