= Alinjarria elongata =

Scientific classification
- Kingdom: Animalia
- Phylum: Arthropoda
- Clade: Pancrustacea
- Class: Insecta
- Order: Orthoptera
- Suborder: Ensifera
- Family: Tettigoniidae
- Genus: Alinjarria
- Species: A. elongata

Binomial name
- Alinjarria elongata (Rentz, 1993)

Species of cricket-like animal

Alinjarria elongata, commonly known as the territory imitator, is a species of bush-cricket from tropical northern Australia. The common name is derived from the fact that the species was at first thought to be a member of the genus Hemisaga until it was realised that its unique characteristics warranted placing it in a new genus.

== Description ==
This is a large long-legged bush cricket with short wings. It can be distinguished from Alinjarria jadoni, the only other species in the genus, by the elongation of the male's cerci which have a noticeably larger internal flange. The female's cerci are also distinctive because they curve outwards.

== Distribution ==
This species is found in tropical northwestern Australia, with a range extending from Darwin to Mataranka in the Northern Territory. It is a woodland species, also found in bushes and scrub.

== Ecology ==
Alinjarria elongata is a predator. It has been observed in the daytime in shrubs, tall vegetation and rough grasses, catching insects. In the night-time it has been seen in sorghum crops, feeding on scarab beetles and on other species of bush cricket.
