= Paralistroscelis =

Scientific classification
- Domain: Eukaryota
- Kingdom: Animalia
- Phylum: Arthropoda
- Class: Insecta
- Order: Orthoptera
- Suborder: Ensifera
- Family: Tettigoniidae
- Subfamily: Listroscelidinae
- Genus: Paralistroscelis; Carl, 1908
- Species: P. listrosceloides

Binomial name
- Paralistroscelis listrosceloides (Karny, 1907)

Synonyms
- Hexacentrus listrosceloides Karny, 1907; Paralistroscelis insularis Carl, 1908

Genus of katydids

Paralistroscelis is a genus of bush-cricket containing a single species, Paralistroscelis listrosceloides , that occurs in Madagascar.
