= Mastophora leucabulba =

Scientific classification
- Domain: Eukaryota
- Kingdom: Animalia
- Phylum: Arthropoda
- Subphylum: Chelicerata
- Class: Arachnida
- Order: Araneae
- Infraorder: Araneomorphae
- Family: Araneidae
- Genus: Mastophora
- Species: M. leucabulba

Binomial name
- Mastophora leucabulba (Gertsch, 1955)

Species of spider

Mastophora leucabulba is a species of orb weaver in the spider family Araneidae. It is found in a range from the United States to Honduras. Like all known species of the genus Mastophora, adult females are bolas spiders, capturing their prey with one or more sticky drops at the end of a single line of silk rather than in a web. Males and juvenile females capture their prey directly with their legs.
