= Neobarrettia victoriae =

Scientific classification
- Domain: Eukaryota
- Kingdom: Animalia
- Phylum: Arthropoda
- Class: Insecta
- Order: Orthoptera
- Suborder: Ensifera
- Family: Tettigoniidae
- Genus: Neobarrettia
- Species: N. victoriae

Binomial name
- Neobarrettia victoriae (Caudell, 1907)

Species of cricket-like animal

Neobarrettia victoriae, the lesser arid-land katydid, is a species of spiny predatory katydid in the family Tettigoniidae. It is found in Central America and North America.
