= Alinjarria =

Scientific classification
- Domain: Eukaryota
- Kingdom: Animalia
- Phylum: Arthropoda
- Class: Insecta
- Order: Orthoptera
- Suborder: Ensifera
- Family: Tettigoniidae
- Subfamily: Listroscelidinae
- Genus: Alinjarria; Rentz, Su & Ueshima, 2007

Species
- See text

Genus of cricket-like animals

Alinjarria is a genus of bush-crickets including two species, one from the east of Australia and the other from the west. The genus was erected by Rentz, Su & Ueshima in 2007.

== Species ==
- Alinjarria elongata (Rentz)
- Alinjarria jadni Rentz, Su & Ueshima
