= Paraclinata chlorotes =

Scientific classification
- Kingdom: Animalia
- Phylum: Arthropoda
- Clade: Pancrustacea
- Class: Insecta
- Order: Hemiptera
- Suborder: Auchenorrhyncha
- Family: Cicadidae
- Genus: Paraclinata
- Species: P. chlorotes

Binomial name
- Paraclinata chlorotes Moulds & Marshall, 2025

Species of cicada

Paraclinata chlorotes, also known as the green wingbanger, is a species of cicada in the family, Cicadidae, subfamily Cicadettinae and tribe Cicadettini. The species is endemic to Australia. It was described in 2025 by Australian entomologists Maxwell Sydney Moulds and David C. Marshall.

== Etymology ==
The specific epithet chlorotes, from Greek χλωροτης (“greenness”), refers to the species’ colouration.

== Description ==
The length of the forewing is 15–18 mm. Body length is 12–15 mm. Body colouring is mostly pale green.

== Distribution and habitat ==
The species is found in the northern half of Western Australia, the Tanami Desert of the Northern Territory, and central southern Queensland.

== Behaviour ==
Adults have been recorded In October, January and February, emitting pulsing, buzzing songs.
