= Paraclinata =

Scientific classification
- Kingdom: Animalia
- Phylum: Arthropoda
- Clade: Pancrustacea
- Class: Insecta
- Order: Hemiptera
- Suborder: Auchenorrhyncha
- Superfamily: Cicadoidea
- Family: Cicadidae
- Subfamily: Cicadettinae
- Tribe: Cicadettini
- Genus: Paraclinata; Moulds & Marshall, 2025

Genus of cicadas

Paraclinata is a genus of cicadas, also known as wingbangers, in the family Cicadidae, subfamily Cicadettinae and tribe Cicadettini. It is endemic to Australia. It was described in 2025 by Australian entomologists Maxwell Sydney Moulds and David C. Marshall.

== Etymology ==
The generic name Paraclinata is a combination of Greek para (“nearby”) and the genus Clinata, referring to their close relationship.

== Species ==
As of 2025 the genus contained two valid species:

- Paraclinata chlorotes Moulds & Marshall, 2025 (Green Wingbanger)
- Paraclinata nullarboris Moulds & Marshall, 2025 (Nullarbor Wingbanger)
