= Wolf in sheep's clothing =

Idiom for those playing a deceptive role

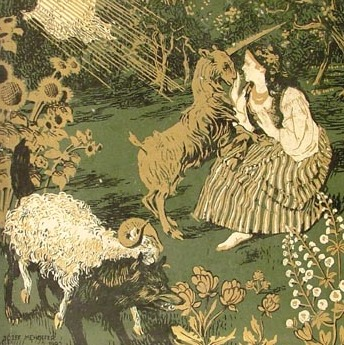
This 1903 work by Józef Mehoffer depicts a wolf disguised as a sheep.

A wolf in sheep's clothing is an idiom from Jesus's Sermon on the Mount as narrated in the Gospel of Matthew. It warns against individuals who play a deceptive role. The gospel regards such individuals (particularly false teachers) as dangerous.

Fables based on the idiom, dated no earlier than the 12th century CE, have been falsely credited to ancient Greek storyteller Aesop (620–564 BCE). The confusion arises from the similarity of themes in Aesop's Fables concerning wolves that are mistakenly trusted, with the moral that human nature eventually shows through any disguise.

In the modern era, zoologists have applied the idiom to the use of aggressive mimicry by predators, whether the disguise is as the prey itself, or as a different but harmless species.

== Origin and variants ==
The phrase originates in the Sermon on the Mount by Jesus recorded in the Christian New Testament: "Beware of false prophets, which come to you in sheep's clothing, but inwardly they are ravening wolves". The sermon then suggests that their true nature will be revealed by their actions ("by their fruits shall ye know them", verse 16). In the centuries following, the phrase was used many times in the Latin writings of the Church Fathers. Later, it was taken up in European vernacular literature. A Latin proverb emerged, Pelle sub agnina latitat mens saepe lupina (Under a sheep's skin often hides a wolfish mind). The story of a wolf disguised as a sheep has been counted as one of Aesop's Fables in modern times, but there is no record of a fable with this precise theme before the Middle Ages; there are earlier fables of Aesop in Greek sources to which the Gospel parable might allude.

The first fable concerning a wolf that disguises itself in a sheep's skin is told by the 12th-century Greek rhetorician Nikephoros Basilakis in his Progymnasmata (rhetorical exercises). It is prefaced with the comment that "You can get into trouble by wearing a disguise" and is followed by the illustrative story:

A wolf once decided to change his nature by changing his appearance, and thus get plenty to eat. He put on a sheepskin and accompanied the flock to the pasture. The shepherd was fooled by the disguise. When night fell, the shepherd shut up the wolf in the fold with the rest of the sheep and as the fence was placed across the entrance, the sheepfold was securely closed off. But when the shepherd wanted a sheep for his supper, he took his knife and killed the wolf.

The conclusion drawn is different from the Gospel story. In the former, one is warned to beware of hypocritical evil-doers; Nikephoros warns that evil-doing carries its own penalty.

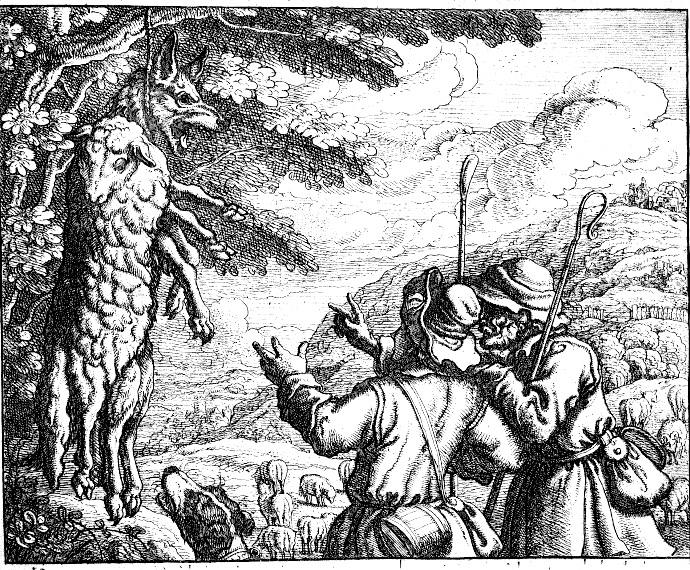
Woodcut by Francis Barlow, 1687; the end of "The Wolf in Sheep's Clothing"

The next version does not appear until three centuries later in the Hecatomythium of the 15th-century Italian scholar Laurentius Abstemius. In his telling,

A wolf, dressed in a sheep's skin, blended himself in with the flock of sheep, every day killed one of the sheep. When the shepherd noticed this was happening, he hanged the wolf on a very tall tree. When other shepherds asked him why he had hanged a sheep, the shepherd answered: The skin is that of a sheep, but the activities were those of a wolf. This fable shows that people should be judged not by their outward demeanor but by their works, for many in sheep's clothing do the work of wolves.

Certain elements of this story are to be found in Aesop's fable of the shepherd who raised a wolf cub among his dogs. When it was grown, it secretly reverted to type. If a wolf stole a sheep and the dogs could not catch it, the guardian wolf continued the chase and shared the meal with the marauder. On other occasions it would kill a sheep and share the meat with the other dogs. Eventually the shepherd discovered what was happening and hanged the wolf. What may be a reference to this story occurs in an anonymous poem in the Greek Anthology in which a goat laments that it is made to suckle a wolf-cub,

Not by my own will but the shepherd's folly.
The beast reared by me will make me his prey,
For gratitude cannot change nature.

The Perry Index lists three versions of the Greek fable, numbered 234, 267, and 451. Variant 234 concerns a wolf that regularly comes to view the flock, but never attempts any harm. Eventually, the shepherd comes to trust it, and on one occasion leaves the wolf on guard. He returns to find his flock decimated and blames himself for being taken in. In none of the cases does Aesop suggest that the wolf disguised itself as a sheep.

As in the case of The Walnut Tree, version 267 would not have been the first time that Abstemius adapted one of Aesop's fables to fit a contemporary idiom, in this case that of the wolf in sheep's clothing. Though the commonest retelling of the story in English echoes Abstemius, it is often credited to Aesop.

Yet another variation on the disguise theme was included in the Cento favole morali ("100 moral fables", 1570) of the Italian poet Giovanni Maria Verdizotti. In this the wolf dresses itself as a shepherd, but when it tries to imitate his call, it wakes the real shepherd and his dogs. Since the wolf is encumbered by its disguise, it cannot get away and is killed. This is the version followed in La Fontaine's Fables (III.3). The conclusion both poets draw is the same as Nikephoros's. The story entered the English canon under the title "The wolf turned shepherd" in Roger L'Estrange's 1692 fable collection and in verse as "The Wolf in Disguise" in Robert Dodsley's 1765 Select fables of Esop and other fabulists.

== Artistic interpretations ==
Earlier illustrations of the fable concentrated on the hanging of the wolf. More recently, the emphasis has been on the disguise. In France, the theme of the wolf disguised in shepherd's clothing is more common and Gustave Doré's 1868 print of the subject was later reused in the 1977 set of postage stamps from Burundi featuring this and other fables.

A number of albums are titled A Wolf in Sheep's Clothing, although most are references to the idiom and the fable is not mentioned in the words of any of the songs. The same is true of many songs that have the phrase as their title. One exception is the lyric by Tackhead on their 1991 CD Strange Things, which uses the fable for a satirical attack on Capitalist entrepreneurs.

== Applications ==
=== In politics ===
Wolf in sheep's clothing in the original coat of arms of the Fabian Society

In politics, the Fabian Society, a British socialist organisation founded in 1884, used a wolf in sheep's clothing in its coat of arms. This was intended to represent "its preferred methodology for achieving its goal." More recently, the term has been used for its negative connotations of appearing harmless but intending consequences that the speaker considers undesirable. For example, in 1967, 'Special Districts' in US administration were so described, with the conclusion that "the proliferation of special districts is not the most desirable means of strengthening responsible local government."

=== In zoology ===
Zoologists have repeatedly compared predatory animals which make use of aggressive mimicry to a wolf in sheep's clothing. The idiom has in addition been applied slightly more broadly for aggressive masquerade, where the predator is disguised as a harmless object, not necessarily the prey. Predators which have been described using the idiom include jumping spiders, lacewings, ant-mimicking aphids, hemipteran bugs mimicking chrysomelid beetles, bird-dropping spiders which masquerade as inanimate excreta, orchid mantises camouflaged as flower parts, cichlid fish, and the zone-tailed hawk which flies with vultures. These animals have evolved to deceive their prey by appearing as other prey or harmless objects, or like angler fish and snapping turtles lure the prey by appearing as the prey's prey. The well-attested form of mimicry by predators can be contrasted with defensive mimicry by prey animals against predators, such as Batesian mimicry.

Aggressive "Wolf in sheep's clothing" mimicry contrasted with a defensive form, Batesian mimicry. The model for an aggressive mimic can be a harmless species, in which case the three roles are played by separate species, or the model can be the prey itself, in which case the arrangement involves only two species.

== See also ==
- Deception
