= Trimeresurus flavomaculatus halieus =

Scientific classification
- Kingdom: Animalia
- Phylum: Chordata
- Class: Reptilia
- Order: Squamata
- Suborder: Serpentes
- Family: Viperidae
- Genus: Trimeresurus
- Species: T. flavomaculatus
- Subspecies: T. f. halieus

Trinomial name
- Trimeresurus flavomaculatus halieus Griffin, 1910

Synonyms
- Trimeresurus halieus Griffin, 1910; Trimeresurus flavomaculatus halieus – Leviton, 1961

Subspecies of snake

Trimeresurus flavomaculatus halieus is a venomous pitviper subspecies endemic to the Philippines.

== Geographic range ==
It is found in the Philippines on the island of Polillo. The type locality given is "Island of Polillo, P.I." (= Philippine Islands).

== Taxonomy ==
Gumprecht (2001, 2002) relegated this subspecies to the synonymy of Trimeresurus flavomaculatus.
