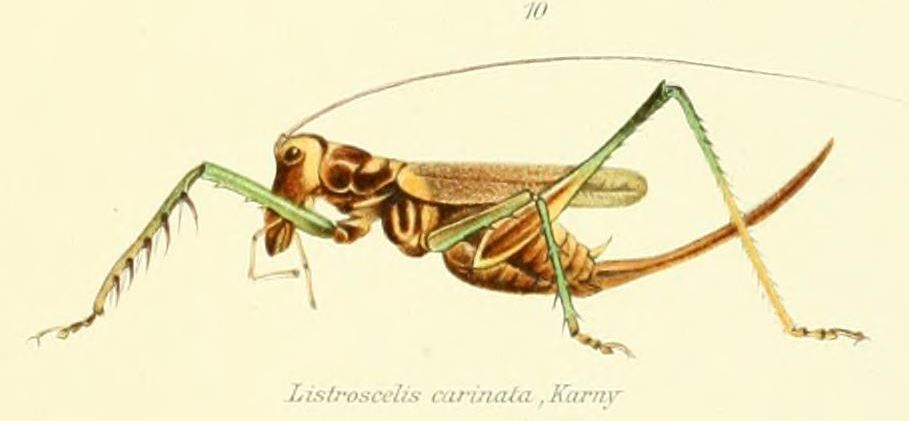
- Listroscelis carinata
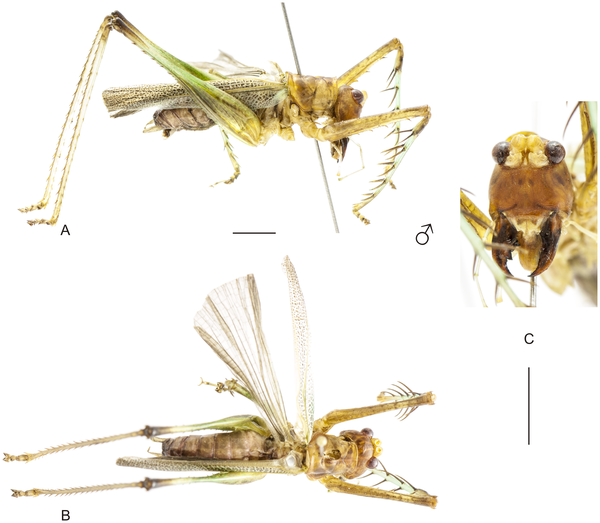
- Listroscelis cohni

Scientific classification
- Kingdom: Animalia
- Phylum: Arthropoda
- Class: Insecta
- Order: Orthoptera
- Suborder: Ensifera
- Superfamily: Tettigonioidea
- Family: Tettigoniidae
- Subfamily: Listroscelidinae; Redtenbacher, 1891

= Listroscelidinae =

Subfamily of cricket-like animals

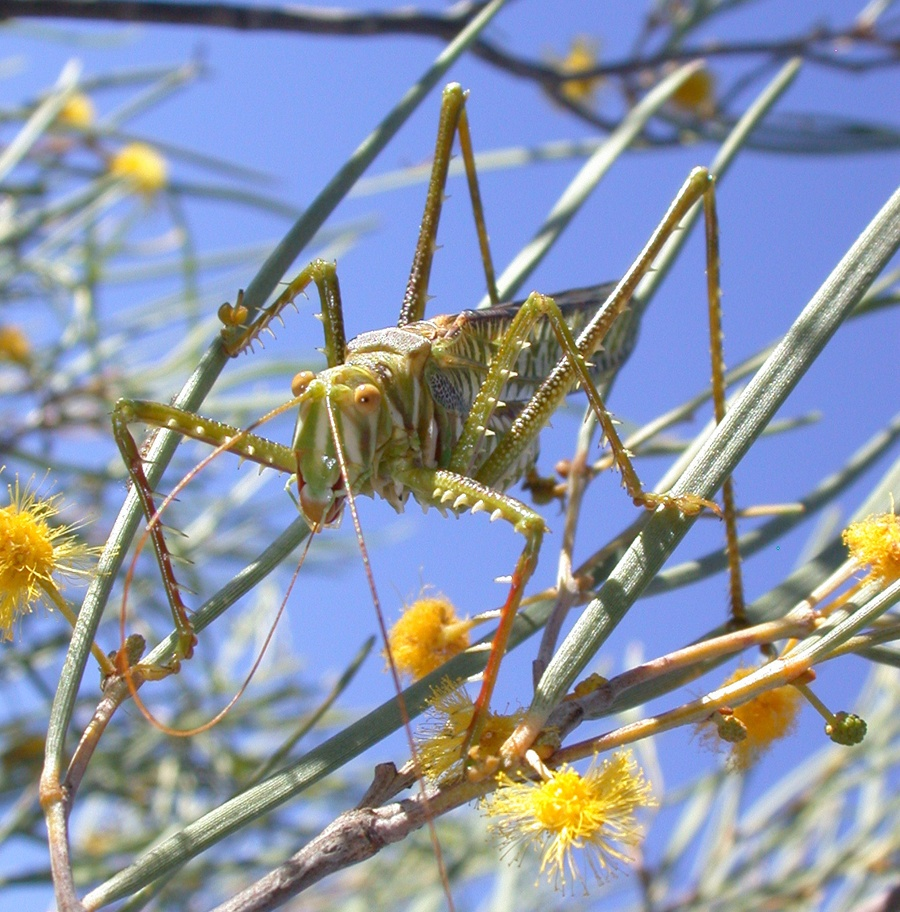
Chlorobalius leucoviridis

The Listroscelidinae are a subfamily of the Tettigoniidae found in the Americas, Madagascar, and Australia. The genus Arachnoscelis has become better known to the public after being featured on the cover of Science in 2012.

== Tribes and genera ==
The Orthoptera Species File lists the following tribes and genera:

Conocephalomimini

Authority: Rentz, 2001; distribution: Australia

1. Conocephalomima Rentz, 2001

Hamayulini

Authority: Fialho, Chamorro-Rengifo & Lopes-Andrade, 2014; distribution: S. America

1. Hamayulus Fialho, Chamorro-Rengifo & Lopes-Andrade, 2014

=== Listroscelidini ===
Authority: Redtenbacher, 1891; distribution: S. America

1. Carliella Karny, 1911
2. Cerberodon Perty, 1832
3. Isocarliella Mello-Leitão, 1940
4. Listroscelis Serville, 1831
5. Macrometopon Bruner, 1915
6. Monocerophora Walker, 1869
7. Venatorellus Mendes, Chamorro-Rengifo & Rafael, 2016

=== Requenini ===
Authority: Rentz, 2001; distribution: Australia

1. Requena Walker, 1869
2. Thumelinia Rentz, 2001
3. Xingbaoia Rentz, 2001

=== Terpandrini ===
Authority: Gorochov, 1990; distribution: Americas, Australia

1. Burnuia Rentz, 2001
2. Chlorobalius Tepper, 1896
3. Megatympanon Piza, 1958
4. Neobarrettia Rehn, 1901
5. Terpandrus Stål, 1874
6. Yullandria Rentz, 2001
7. Yutjuwalia Rentz, 2001

=== Tribe not determined ===
- Alinjarria Rentz, Su & Ueshima, 2007
- Arachnoscelis Karny, 1911
- Liostethomimus Karny, 1914
- Paralistroscelis Carl, 1908
