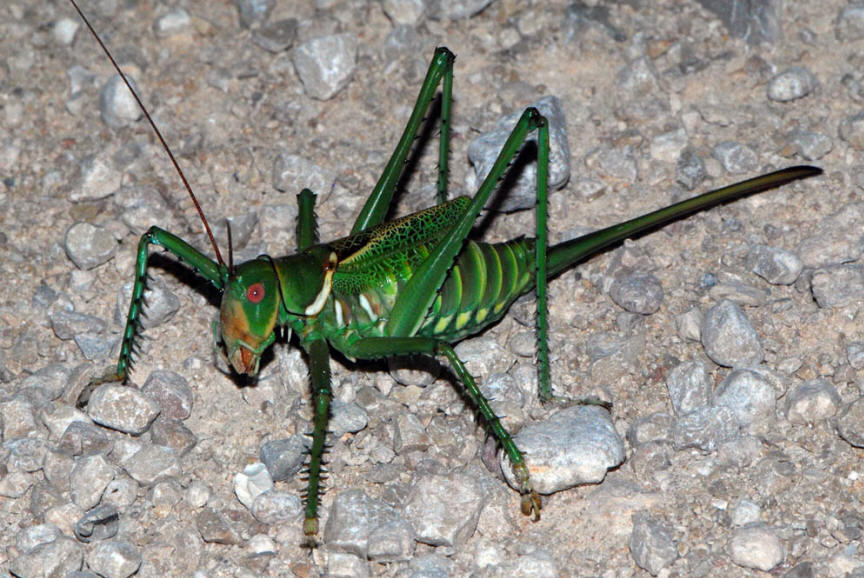

Scientific classification
- Kingdom: Animalia
- Phylum: Arthropoda
- Clade: Pancrustacea
- Class: Insecta
- Order: Orthoptera
- Suborder: Ensifera
- Family: Tettigoniidae
- Genus: Neobarrettia
- Species: N. spinosa

Binomial name
- Neobarrettia spinosa (Caudell, 1907)

Synonyms
- Rehnia spinosa Caudell, 1907; Neobarrettia cerberus (Rehn & Hebard, 1920); Rehnia cerberus Rehn & Hebard, 1920

= Neobarrettia spinosa =

Species of katydid

Neobarrettia spinosa, also known as the greater arid-land katydid, red eyed katydid (or red eyed devil), or giant Texas katydid, is a species of katydid native to the southwestern United States and northern Mexico.

== Habitat ==
Neobarrettia spinosa inhabits oak-juniper woodlands and arid-land deserts with mesquites or other brushes.

== Biology ==
Neobarrettia spinosa is a carnivorous insect. It stalks through the underbrush and consumes grasshoppers, other katydids, caterpillars, small frogs, lizards, and any other small animal it can overpower. It is a known predator of the endangered black-capped vireo. These animals present a threat posture when under attack, and will defend with a powerful bite and strong kick.
