= Arachnocoris trinitatis =

Scientific classification
- Domain: Eukaryota
- Kingdom: Animalia
- Phylum: Arthropoda
- Class: Insecta
- Order: Hemiptera
- Suborder: Heteroptera
- Family: Nabidae
- Genus: Arachnocoris
- Species: A. trinitatis

Binomial name
- Arachnocoris trinitatis Bergroth, 1916

Species of true bug

Arachnocoris trinitatis is a true bug species found in Trinidad, West Indies. It is often found living in the webs of the pholcid spider Mesabolivar aurantiacus (Mello-Leitão, 1930). It seems to prefer empty webs, possibly utilizing them as a ready-made prey-capture device, and possibly as a site for finding mates. A. trinitatis can be found in webs all year, but is much less common during the dry season. About one quarter of M. aurantiacus webs contain at least one A. trinitatis during the wet season, with some containing two or three. When two adults are found, they are often 0.5 to 4 cm apart from each other, while keeping a distance from the host spider. They were observed to attack entangled prey, but then retreat when the spider approached it. Adults fly readily when disturbed.
