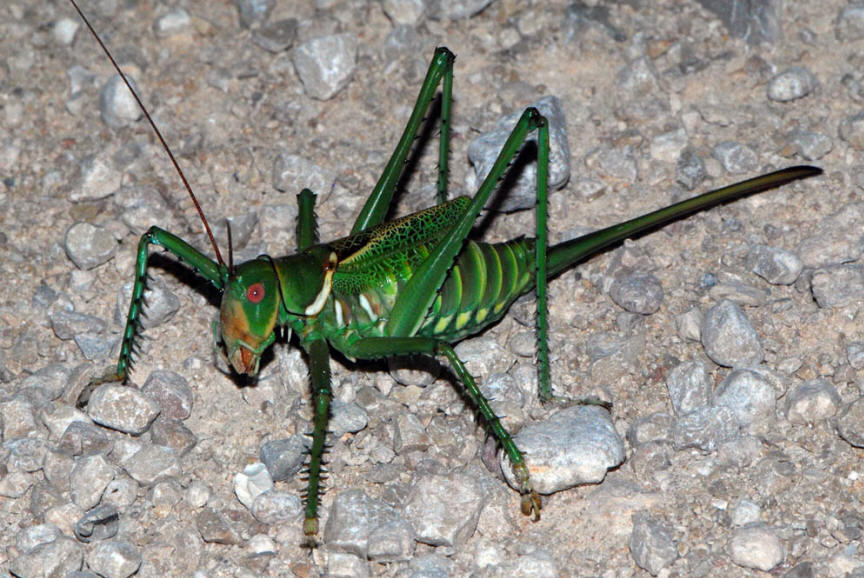

Scientific classification
- Domain: Eukaryota
- Kingdom: Animalia
- Phylum: Arthropoda
- Class: Insecta
- Order: Orthoptera
- Suborder: Ensifera
- Family: Tettigoniidae
- Subfamily: Listroscelidinae
- Genus: Neobarrettia; Rehn, 1901

= Neobarrettia =

Genus of cricket-like animals

Neobarrettia is a genus of North American, spiny predatory katydids in the tribe Terpandrini.

== Species ==
There are nine described species in Neobarrettia.

- Neobarrettia bambalio Cohn, 1965
- Neobarrettia cremnobates Cohn, 1965
- Neobarrettia hakippah Cohn, 1965
- Neobarrettia imperfecta (Rehn, 1900)
- Neobarrettia pulchella (Tinkham, 1944)
- Neobarrettia sinaloae (Rehn & Hebard, 1920)
- Neobarrettia spinosa (Caudell, 1907) – greater arid-land katydid
- Neobarrettia vannifera Cohn, 1965
- Neobarrettia victoriae (Caudell, 1907) – lesser arid-land katydid
