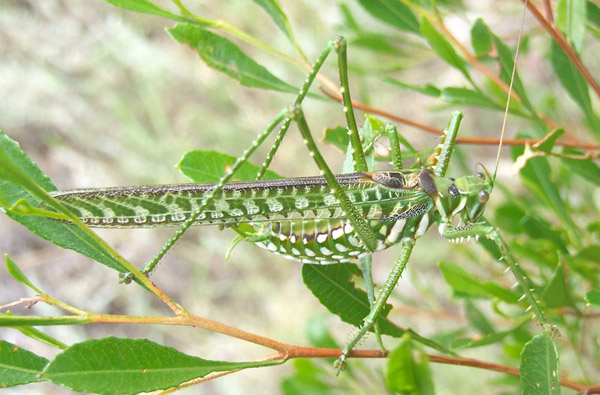

Scientific classification
- Kingdom: Animalia
- Phylum: Arthropoda
- Clade: Pancrustacea
- Class: Insecta
- Order: Orthoptera
- Suborder: Ensifera
- Family: Tettigoniidae
- Subfamily: Listroscelidinae
- Genus: Chlorobalius; Tepper, 1896
- Species: C. leucoviridis

Binomial name
- Chlorobalius leucoviridis Tepper, 1896

Synonyms
- Terpandroides pulcherrimus Ander, 1957; Yorkiella vidua Carl, 1921; Yorkiella picta Carl, 1908

= Chlorobalius =

Species of cricket-like animal

Chlorobalius is a monotypic genus of Australian bush crickets (katydids) in the tribe Terpandrini containing the single species Chlorobalius leucoviridis, sometimes known as the spotted predatory katydid. C. leucoviridis is a predator and is an acoustic aggressive mimic of cicadas; by imitating the sounds and movements made by female cicadas, it lures male cicadas to within its reach and then eats them.

== Taxonomy ==
Chlorobalius leucoviridis was first described by the Prussian/Australian botanist and entomologist Johann Gottlieb Otto Tepper in 1896. It forms part of the family Tettigoniidae, the subfamily Listroscelidinae and the tribe Terpendrini, the gum-leaf katyatids.

== Description ==
The adult Chlorobalius leucoviridis is a large, cryptically coloured katydid. The body, wings and legs are barred and spotted in green and white. The legs bear short spines and both males and females have stridulatory organs, the male has a file-and-scraper structure on the tegmen (fore-wing) while the female has pegs on the hind wing which rub against certain veins on the fore-wing.

== Distribution and habitat ==
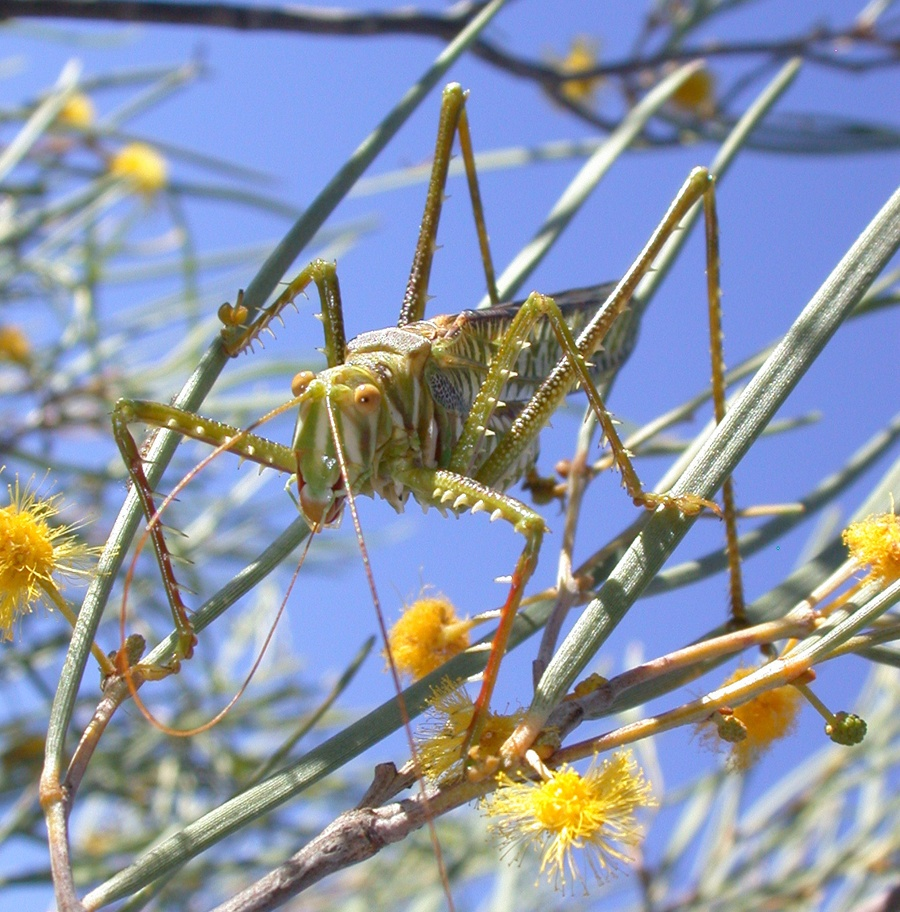
Male

Chlorobalius leucoviridis is native to arid, inland regions of Australia. It is typically found high in a large bush or small tree.

== Behaviour ==
Chlorobalius leucoviridis is nocturnal and occurs in small groups which move from one location to another. It feeds by catching other insects such as flies, grasshoppers and other katydids, grasping the prey with its fore-legs or first two pairs of legs, and immobilising it by biting it under the throat. The spines on the legs seem to play a part in controlling larger prey items. The male makes loud, trilling songs to lead females of its own species towards its location.

The male attracts male cicadas on which to feed by mimicry, luring them to its vicinity by deception. This is accomplished both acoustically, by audible wing-clicking in a pattern similar to that used by sexually-receptive female cicadas, and visually by the use of synchronised body movements similar to those exhibited by the females. Remarkably, the katydid has the ability to mimic the sounds and movements of a number of different prey species, even some species with which it has never had direct contact.
