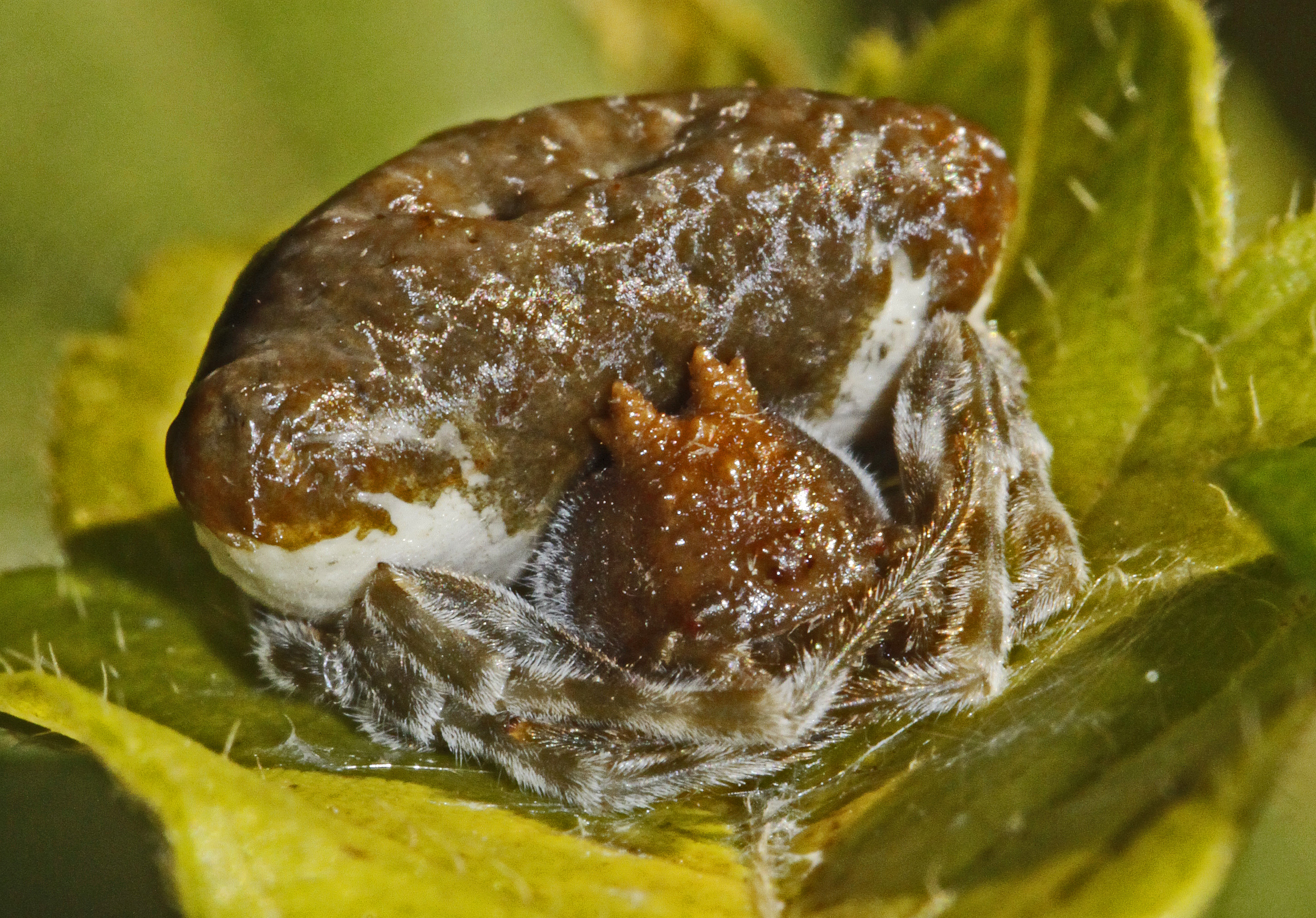
- M. phrynosoma female from Virginia

Scientific classification
- Kingdom: Animalia
- Phylum: Arthropoda
- Subphylum: Chelicerata
- Class: Arachnida
- Order: Araneae
- Infraorder: Araneomorphae
- Family: Araneidae
- Subfamily: Cyrtarachninae s.l.
- Genus: Mastophora; Holmberg, 1876

Type species
- M. extraordinaria Holmberg, 1876

Species
- 50, see text

Synonyms
- Agathostichus Simon, 1897

= Mastophora (spider) =

Bolas spiders

Genus of spiders

Mastophora, also known as bolas spiders, is a genus of orb-weaver spiders first described by E. L. Holmberg in 1876. They can be identified by a pair of lumps on the dorsal surface of the opisthosoma, though not all males will have these lumps.

Adult females of the genus snare prey mid-air by using a silk line with an adhesive blob on the end, similar to bolas used by South American gauchos. They feed on flying insects, particularly moths, sometimes releasing pheromones that mimic those of their prey to attract them. Males and juvenile females capture their prey directly with their legs. Mastophora spiders have extreme sexual size dimorphism: adult females reach 0,75 inches (19 mm), while adult males are smaller than 0,067 inches (1,7 mm). These spiders reach maturity after two instars, or fewer. Cephalothorax often with dorsal protuberances, frequently paired. Female abdomen large, wider than long, an occasion has dorsal humps or lobes. Prey specialization by means of aggressive chemical mimicry. The attraction of preys by Mastophora is undoubtedly linked to an extraordinary endocrinoid abdominal tissue discovered histologically and named by A. Lopez, France (external link), a structure unfortunately ignored in english and spanish publications concerning the genus nevertheless America autochthonous.

== Species ==
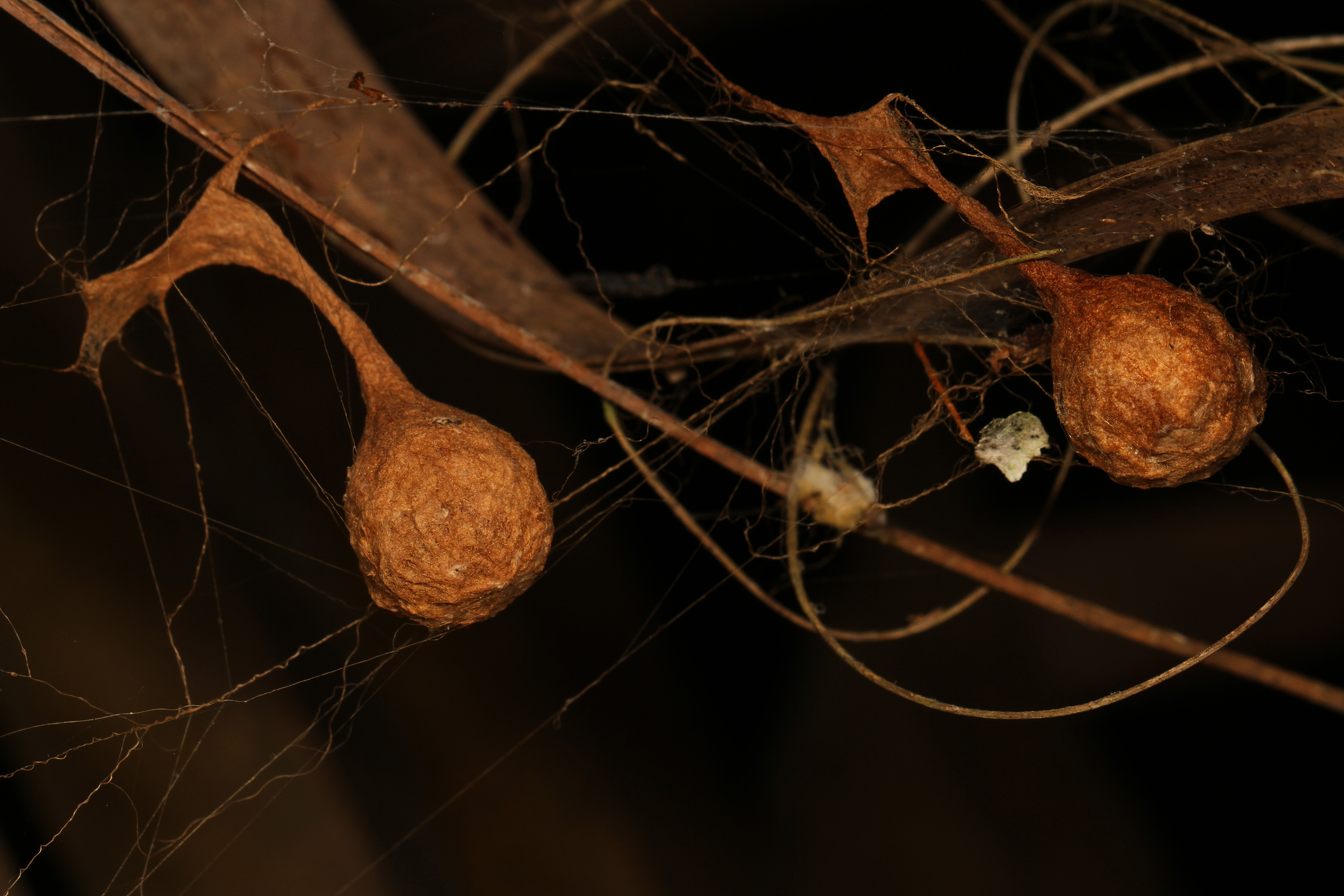
M. bisaccata egg sacs

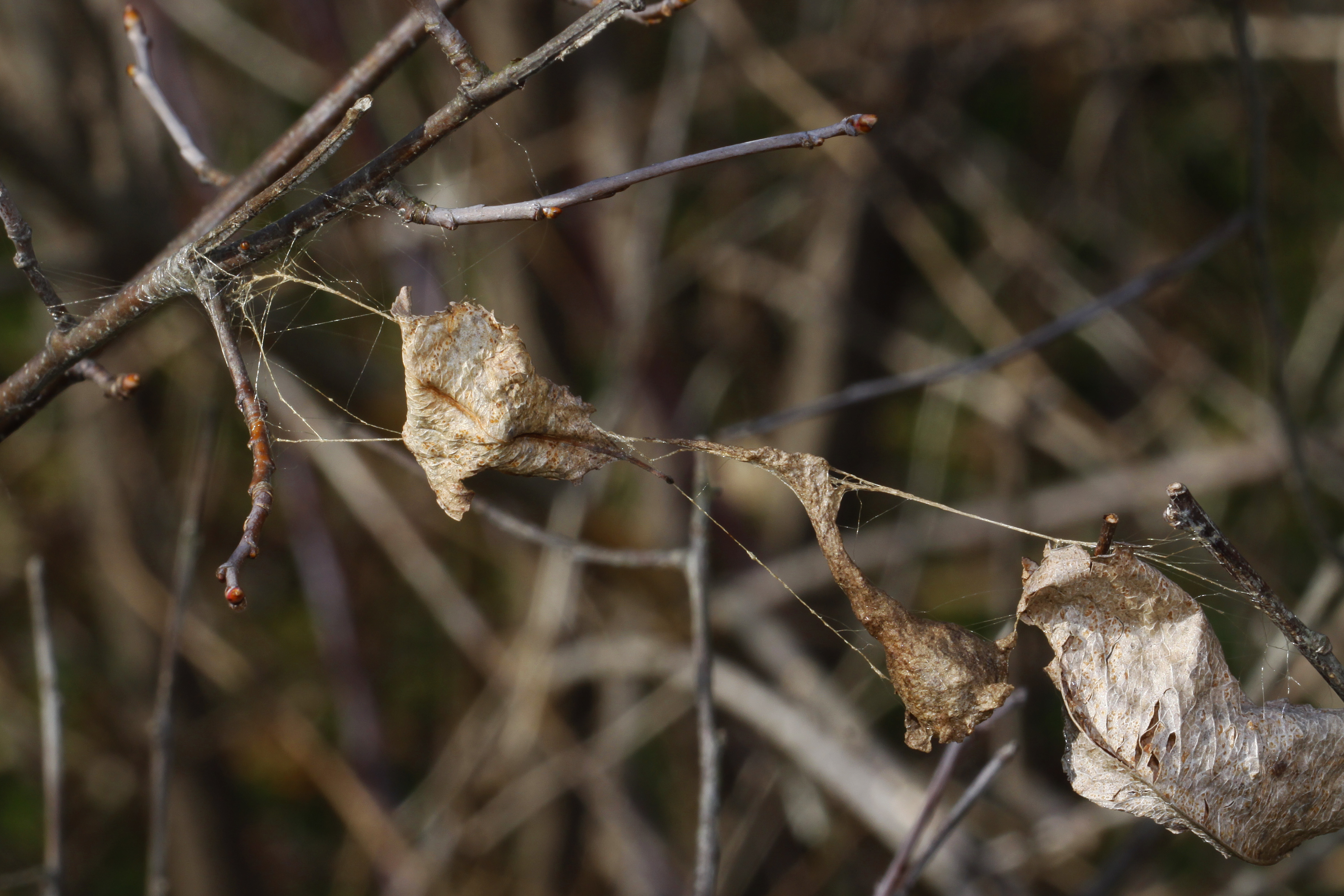
M. phrynosoma egg sac

As of November 2026 it contains fifty species:

- Mastophora abalosi Urtubey & Báez, 1983 – Argentina
- Mastophora alachua Levi, 2003 – USA
- Mastophora alvareztoroi Ibarra & Jiménez, 2003 – USA, Mexico
- Mastophora apalachicola Levi, 2003 – USA
- Mastophora archeri Gertsch, 1955 – USA
- Mastophora bisaccata (Emerton, 1884) – USA, Mexico
- Mastophora brescoviti Levi, 2003 – Brazil
- Mastophora caesariata Eberhard & Levi, 2006 – Costa Rica
- Mastophora carpogastra Mello-Leitão, 1925 – Brazil
- Mastophora catarina Levi, 2003 – Brazil
- Mastophora comma Báez & Urtubey, 1985 – Argentina
- Mastophora conica Levi, 2006 – Argentina
- Mastophora conifera (Holmberg, 1876) – Argentina
- Mastophora cornigera (Hentz, 1850) – USA to Nicaragua
- Mastophora corpulenta (Banks, 1898) – Mexico, Honduras, Nicaragua, Brazil
- Mastophora corumbatai Levi, 2003 – Brazil
- Mastophora cranion Mello-Leitão, 1928 – Brazil
- Mastophora diablo Levi, 2003 – Argentina
- Mastophora dizzydeani Eberhard, 1981 – Colombia, Peru
- Mastophora escomeli Levi, 2003 – Peru
- Mastophora extraordinaria Holmberg, 1876 – Brazil, Uruguay, Argentina
- Mastophora fasciata Reimoser, 1939 – Costa Rica, Venezuela
- Mastophora felda Levi, 2003 – USA
- Mastophora felis Piza, 1976 – Brazil
- Mastophora gasteracanthoides (Nicolet, 1849) – Chile
- Mastophora haywardi Birabén, 1946 – Argentina
- Mastophora holmbergi Canals, 1931 – Paraguay, Argentina
- Mastophora hutchinsoni Gertsch, 1955 – USA, Canada
- Mastophora lara Levi, 2003 – Venezuela
- Mastophora leucabulba (Gertsch, 1955) – USA to Honduras
- Mastophora leucacantha (Simon, 1897) – Brazil
- Mastophora longiceps Mello-Leitão, 1940 – Brazil
- Mastophora melloleitaoi Canals, 1931 – Brazil, Argentina
- Mastophora obtusa Mello-Leitão, 1936 – Brazil
- Mastophora pesqueiro Levi, 2003 – Brazil
- Mastophora phrynosoma Gertsch, 1955 – USA
- Mastophora pickeli Mello-Leitão, 1931 – Brazil
- Mastophora piras Levi, 2003 – Brazil
- Mastophora rabida Levi, 2003 – Galapagos Islands
- Mastophora reimoseri Levi, 2003 – Paraguay
- Mastophora satan Canals, 1931 – Brazil, Uruguay, Argentina
- Mastophora satsuma Levi, 2003 – USA
- Mastophora seminole Levi, 2003 – USA
- Mastophora soberiana Levi, 2003 – Panama
- Mastophora stowei Levi, 2003 – USA
- Mastophora timuqua Levi, 2003 – USA
- Mastophora vaquera Gertsch, 1955 – Cuba
- Mastophora yacare Levi, 2003 – Uruguay
- Mastophora yeargani Levi, 2003 – USA
- Mastophora ypiranga Levi, 2003 – Brazil
