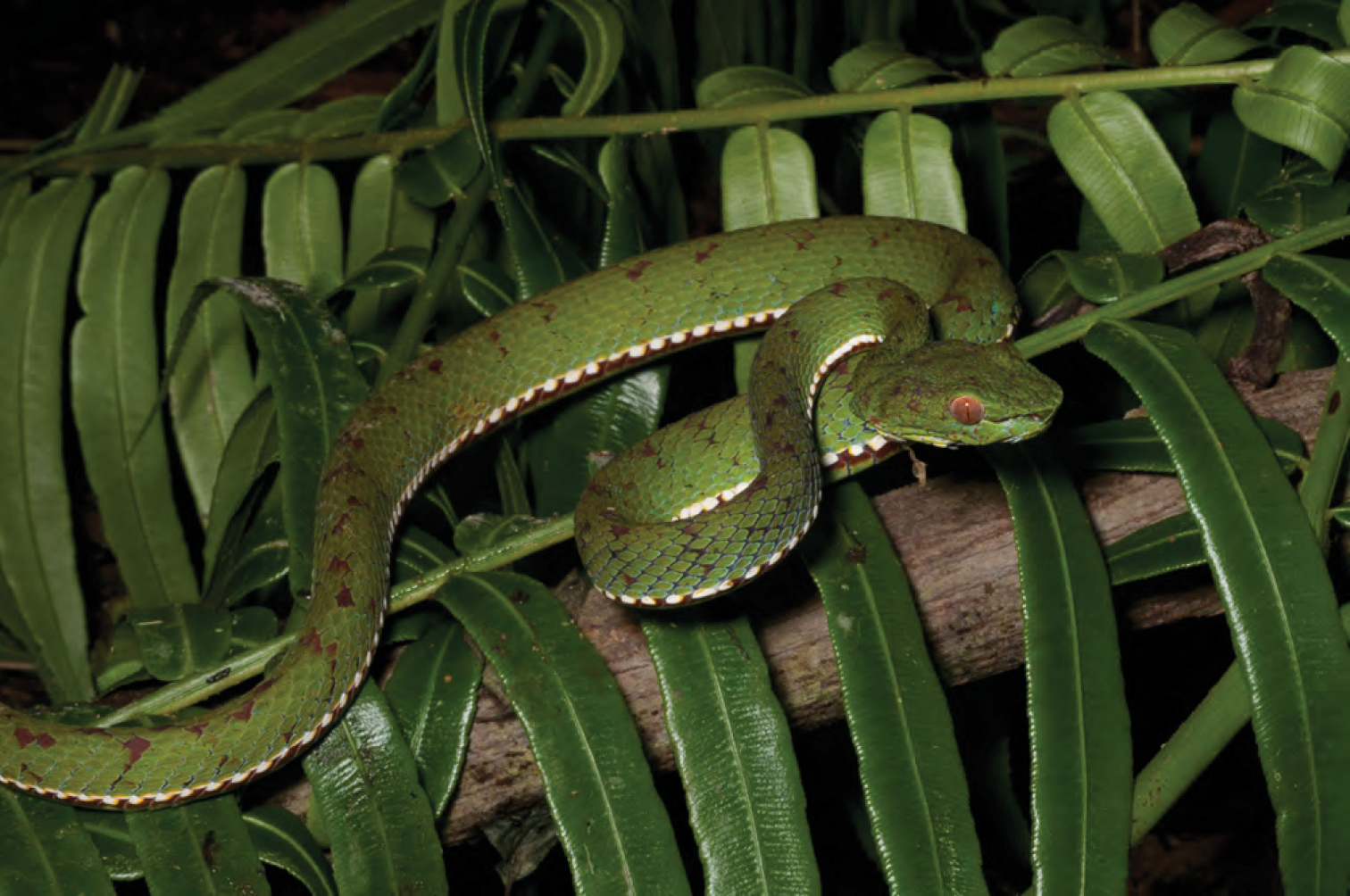

Conservation status
- Least Concern (IUCN 3.1)

Scientific classification
- Kingdom: Animalia
- Phylum: Chordata
- Class: Reptilia
- Order: Squamata
- Suborder: Serpentes
- Family: Viperidae
- Genus: Trimeresurus
- Species: T. flavomaculatus

Binomial name
- Trimeresurus flavomaculatus (Gray, 1842)
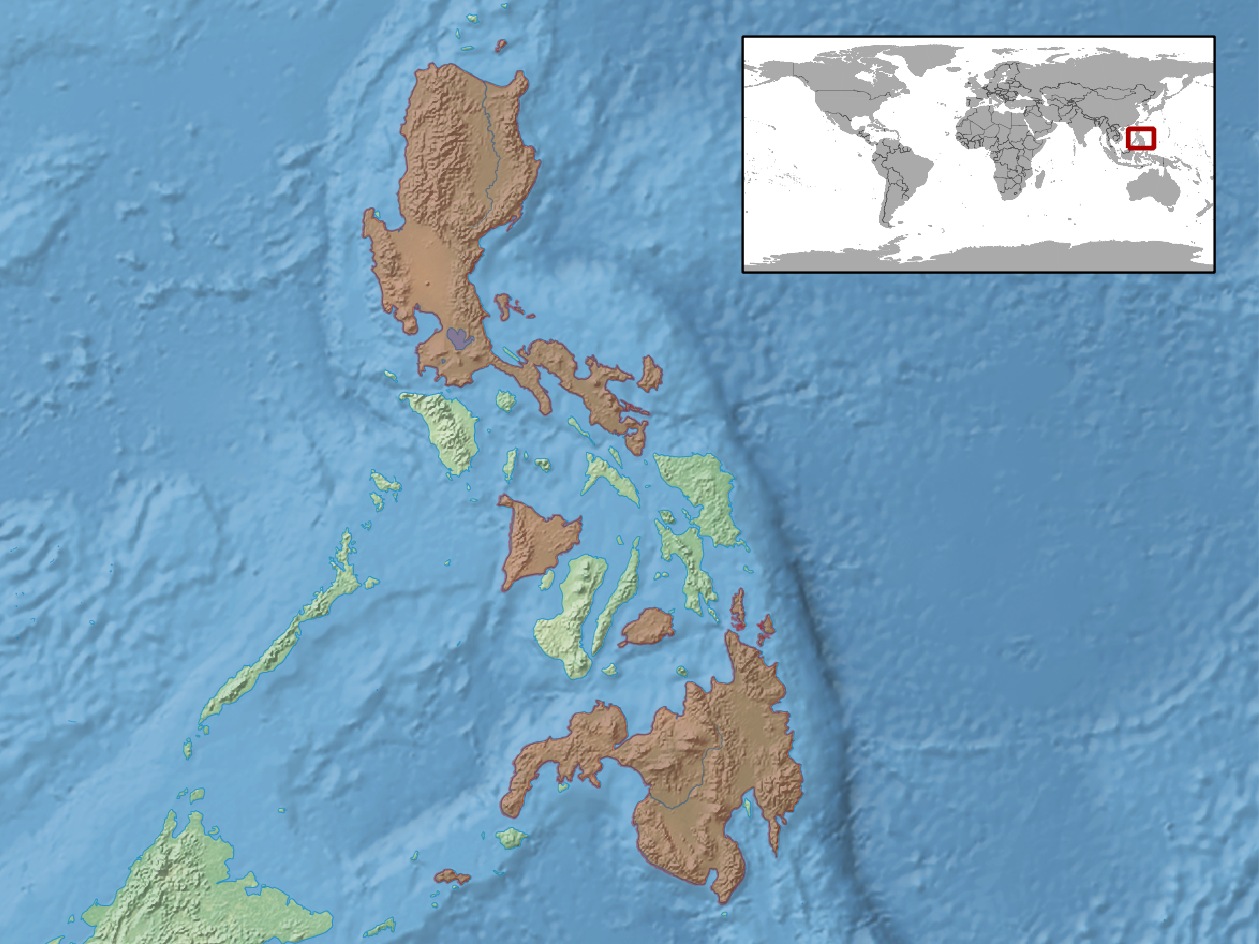

Synonyms
- Megaera flavomaculatus Gray, 1842; Megaera ornata Gray, 1842; Megaera variegata Gray, 1842; Parias flavomaculatus – Gray, 1849; Parias ornata – Gray, 1849; Parias variegata – Gray, 1849; Trimeresurus flavomaculatus – Günther, 1879; Trimeresurus Schadenbergi Fischer, 1885; Lachesis flavomaculatus – Boulenger, 1896; Trimeresurus flavomaculatus flavomaculatus – Leviton, 1961; Parias flavomaculatus – Malhotra & Thorpe, 2004; Trimeresurus (Parias) flavomaculatus – David et al., 2011

= Trimeresurus flavomaculatus =

Species of snake

Trimeresurus flavomaculatus also known as the Philippine pit viper is a venomous pit viper species endemic to the Philippines. Two subspecies are currently recognized, including the nominate subspecies described here.

== Description ==
According to Leviton (1964), the scalation includes 21 rows of dorsal scales at midbody, 170–178/175–184 ventral scales in males/females, 62–71/58–63 subcaudal scales in males/females, and 9–11 supralabial scales of which the 3rd is the largest. Toriba and Sawai (1990) give 167–179/172–184 ventral scales in males/females, 56–70/53–63 subcaudal scales in males/females, and 9–10/9–12 supralabial scales in males/females.

== Geographic range ==
Found on the Philippine islands of Agutayan, Batan, Camiguin, Catanduanes, Dinagat, Jolo, Leyte, Luzon, Mindanao, Mindoro, Negros, Panay and Polillo. The type locality given is "Philippine Islands". Leviton (1964) proposed that this be restricted to "Luzon Island".

== Subspecies ==
Subspecies	Taxon author	Common name	Geographic range
T. f. flavomaculatus	(Gray, 1842)	Philippine pit viper	Philippine islands of Agutayan, Bohol, Camiguin, Catanduanes, Dinagat, Jolo, Leyte, Luzon, Mindanao, Mindoro, Negros and Panay.
T. f. halieus	Griffin, 1910		The Philippines on the island of Polillo.

== Taxonomy ==
Gumprecht (2001, 2002) relegates T. f. halieus to synonymy and elevates T. f. mcgregori to a full species.
