= Lingual luring =

Macrochelys temminckii luring

Lingual luring is a form of aggressive mimicry in which a predator (typically a snake or turtle) uses its tongue to fool potential prey into approaching close to what appears to be a small wriggling worm.

Lingual lures are very well developed in young alligator snapping turtles which wait underwater with their mouths open. The tongue is wriggled like a worm and fishes attracted to it are captured by a rapid snapping of the mouth.

Lingual luring has also been noted in some species of snakes including the garter snake Thamnophis atratus and species of Nerodia (including N. sipedon, N. clarkii and N. rhombifer) – here the luring is initiated by flicking the surface of water with their tongue to attract fish. Similar behaviour has been reported in the snowy egret (Egretta thula) which uses tongue flicking when foraging. The puff adder Bitis arietans uses its tongue which is loosely wriggled like a worm to attract amphibian prey. The puff adder also uses its tail as a lure (caudal luring).
