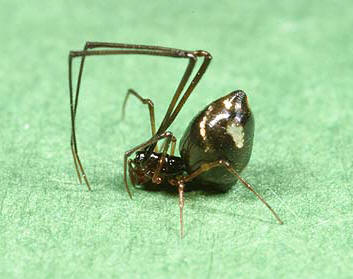
- Faiditus xiphias

Scientific classification
- Kingdom: Animalia
- Phylum: Arthropoda
- Subphylum: Chelicerata
- Class: Arachnida
- Order: Araneae
- Infraorder: Araneomorphae
- Family: Theridiidae
- Subfamily: Argyrodinae
- Genus: Faiditus; Keyserling, 1884

Type species
- F. ecaudatus Keyserling, 1884

Species
- 59, see text

Synonyms
- Bellinda Keyserling, 1884 (removed from S of Argyrodes Simon, 1784)

= Faiditus =

Faiditus Temporal range: Neogene– Present

Genus of spiders

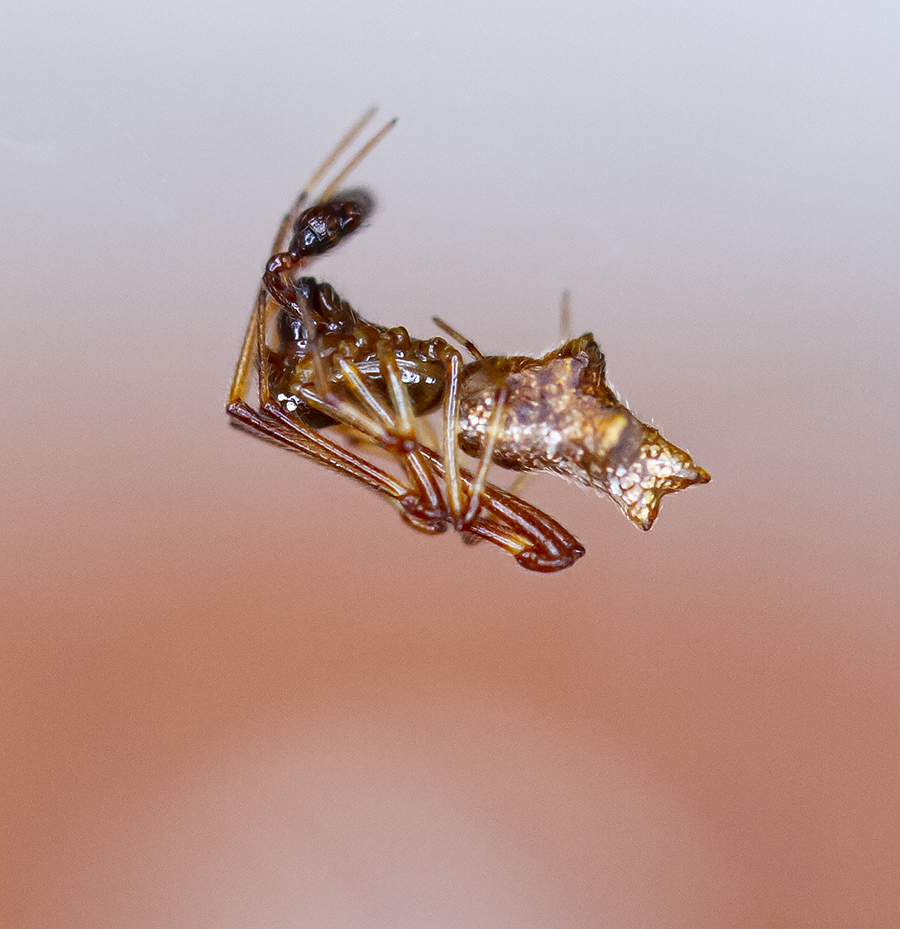
Suspended Faiditus sp. male

Faiditus is a genus of comb-footed spiders that was first described by Eugen von Keyserling in 1884.

== Species ==
As of May 2020 it contains fifty-nine species, all found in the Americas except for F. xiphias, found in Asia:

- F. acuminatus (Keyserling, 1891) – Brazil, Argentina
- F. affinis (O. Pickard-Cambridge, 1880) – Brazil
- F. alticeps (Keyserling, 1891) – Brazil, Paraguay
- F. altus (Keyserling, 1891) – Venezuela, Brazil
- F. amates (Exline & Levi, 1962) – Mexico, Guatemala
- F. americanus (Taczanowski, 1874) – USA to Brazil, Argentina
- F. amplifrons (O. Pickard-Cambridge, 1880) – Panama to Argentina
- F. analiae (González & Carmen, 1996) – Brazil
- F. arthuri (Exline & Levi, 1962) – Panama
- F. atopus (Chamberlin & Ivie, 1936) – Panama to Ecuador
- F. bryantae (Exline & Levi, 1962) – Costa Rica, Panama
- F. cancellatus (Hentz, 1850) – USA, Canada, Bahama Is.
- F. caronae (González & Carmen, 1996) – Brazil
- F. caudatus (Taczanowski, 1874) – USA, Caribbean to Argentina
- F. chicaensis (González & Carmen, 1996) – Argentina
- F. chickeringi (Exline & Levi, 1962) – Panama
- F. cochleaformus (Exline, 1945) – Ecuador, Peru
- F. convolutus (Exline & Levi, 1962) – Guatemala to Peru, Brazil
- F. cordillera (Exline, 1945) – Ecuador
- F. cristinae (González & Carmen, 1996) – Brazil
- F. cubensis (Exline & Levi, 1962) – Cuba
- F. darlingtoni (Exline & Levi, 1962) – Jamaica, Hispaniola
- F. davisi (Exline & Levi, 1962) – USA, Mexico
- F. dracus (Chamberlin & Ivie, 1936) – USA to Paraguay
- F. duckensis (González & Carmen, 1996) – Brazil
- F. ecaudatus Keyserling, 1884 (type) – Brazil
- F. exiguus (Exline & Levi, 1962) – Cuba, Puerto Rico
- F. fulvus (Exline & Levi, 1962) – Brazil
- F. gapensis (Exline & Levi, 1962) – Jamaica
- F. gertschi (Exline & Levi, 1962) – Panama
- F. globosus (Keyserling, 1884) – USA to Ecuador
- F. godmani (Exline & Levi, 1962) – Guatemala
- F. iguazuensis (González & Carmen, 1996) – Argentina
- F. jamaicensis (Exline & Levi, 1962) – Jamaica
- F. laraensis (González & Carmen, 1996) – Argentina
- F. leonensis (Exline & Levi, 1962) – Mexico
- F. maculosus (O. Pickard-Cambridge, 1898) – USA, Mexico
- F. mariae (González & Carmen, 1996) – Argentina
- F. morretensis (González & Carmen, 1996) – Brazil, Argentina
- F. nataliae (González & Carmen, 1996) – Argentina
- F. peruensis (Exline & Levi, 1962) – Peru
- F. plaumanni (Exline & Levi, 1962) – Brazil
- F. proboscifer (Exline, 1945) – Ecuador, Peru
- F. quasiobtusus (Exline & Levi, 1962) – Puerto Rico, Virgin Is.
- F. rossi (Exline & Levi, 1962) – Colombia
- F. sicki (Exline & Levi, 1962) – Brazil
- F. solidao (Levi, 1967) – Brazil
- F. spinosus (Keyserling, 1884) – Venezuela, Peru
- F. striatus (Keyserling, 1891) – Brazil
- F. subdolus (O. Pickard-Cambridge, 1898) – USA to Guatemala
- F. subflavus (Exline & Levi, 1962) – Peru
- F. sullana (Exline, 1945) – Peru
- F. taeter (Exline & Levi, 1962) – Mexico
- F. ululans (O. Pickard-Cambridge, 1880) – Mexico to Brazil
- F. vadoensis (González & Carmen, 1996) – Argentina
- F. woytkowskii (Exline & Levi, 1962) – Peru
- F. xiphias (Thorell, 1887) – Myanmar, India (Nicobar Is.) to Japan, Indonesia (Krakatau)
- F. yacuiensis (González & Carmen, 1996) – Argentina
- F. yutoensis (González & Carmen, 1996) – Argentina
