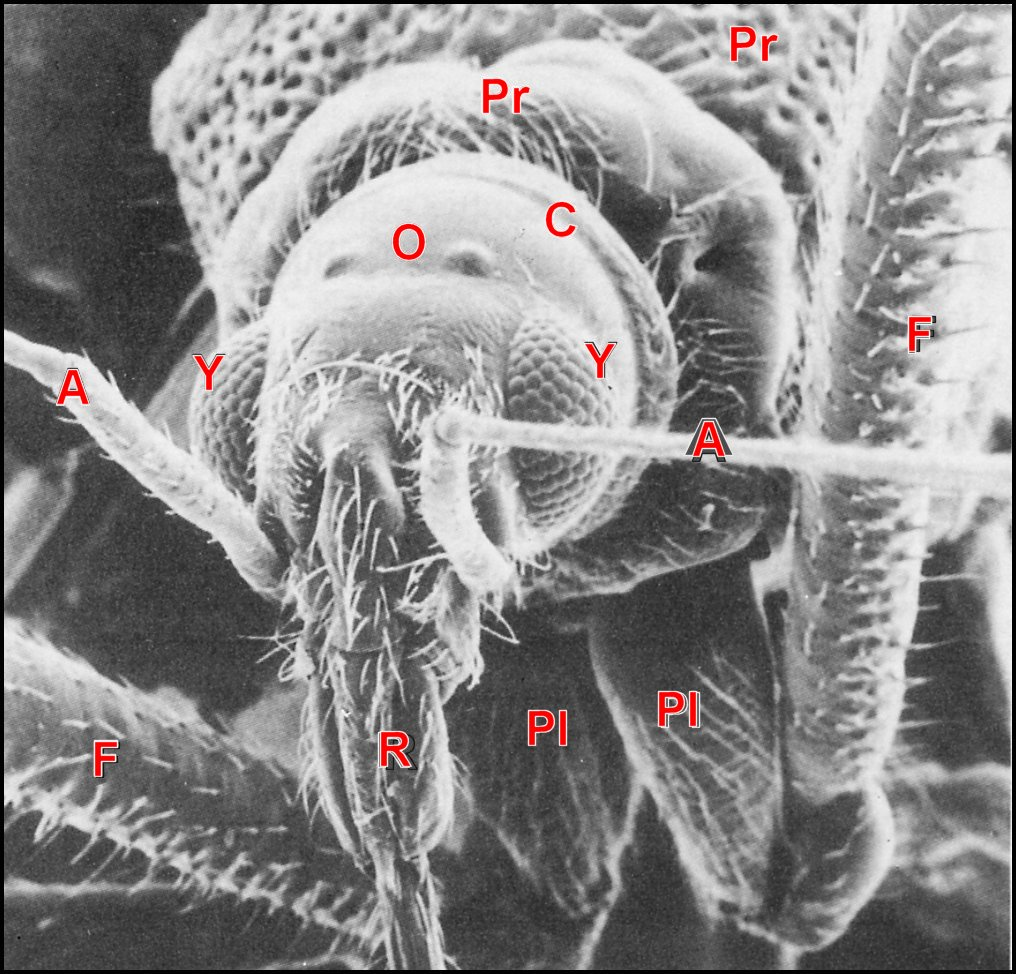

Scientific classification
- Domain: Eukaryota
- Kingdom: Animalia
- Phylum: Arthropoda
- Class: Insecta
- Order: Hemiptera
- Suborder: Heteroptera
- Family: Nabidae
- Subfamily: Nabinae
- Genus: Arachnocoris; Scott, 1881

Diversity
- c. 12 species

= Arachnocoris =

Genus of true bugs

Arachnocoris is a small genus of true bugs found in the Neotropics, including French Guyana and West Indies (André Lopez).

It is often found living in the webs of the pholcid spider Mesabolivar aurantiacus (Mello-Leitão, 1930). It seems to prefer empty webs, possibly utilizing them as a ready-made prey-capture device, and possibly as a site for finding mates.

Members of this genus are often found living in spider web, mostly those of the family Pholcidae. The body of Arachnocoris is adapted for life in spider webs, with white markings on dark ground, similar to the kleptoparasitic spider genus Argyrodes.

== Species ==
- Arachnocoris albomaculatus Scott, 1881
- Arachnocoris trinitatis Bergroth, 1914—Trinidad
- Arachnocoris karukerae Lopez, 1990—French Antilles
- Arachnocoris berytoides Say

== Taxonomy ==
John Scott described two new species in this genus in 1881, which was originally placed in a distinct subgenus by Reuter. This was rejected in 1908, when the discovery of Parachnocoris connected Arachnocoris with the more typical members of the subfamily Nabinae. By 1925, six species were recognized, ranging from Rio de Janeiro, Brazil to Panama, Trinidad and Grenada (West Indies). Today, Arachnocoris and Pararachnocoris are placed in the highly specialized neotropical tribus "Arachnocorini". About a dozen species are recognized as of 2007, while Pararachnocoris is monotypic.
