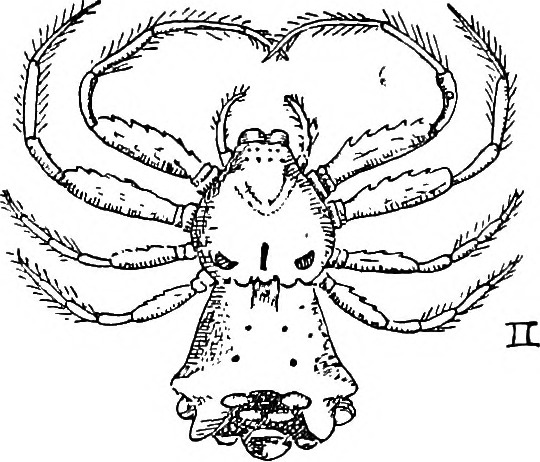

Scientific classification
- Domain: Eukaryota
- Kingdom: Animalia
- Phylum: Arthropoda
- Subphylum: Chelicerata
- Class: Arachnida
- Order: Araneae
- Infraorder: Araneomorphae
- Family: Thomisidae
- Genus: Phrynarachne
- Species: P. decipiens

Binomial name
- Phrynarachne decipiens (Forbes, 1883)

Synonyms
- Ornithoscatoides decipiens O.P.-Cambridge; Thomisus decipiens Forbes

= Phrynarachne decipiens =

Species of spider

Phrynarachne decipiens, the bird-dropping spider, is a species of tropical crab spider from Malaysia and Indonesia (Sumatra and Java). It mimics a bird dropping in its appearance and the way it behaves.

== Description ==
The bird-dropping spider is a master of deception. It crouches stationary on a leaf or other level surface and exhibits an elaborate combination of form and colour, the posture it adopts and the character of its web so as to simulate accurately a patch of bird's excreta. The underside of its abdomen is chalky white and its legs black. It weaves a small irregular white web on the surface of a prominently placed leaf and adopts an upside-down pose near the centre of the web with its legs folded, anchoring itself in place with some spines on its legs. The effect of this is to create the impression of a semi-solidified bird's dropping with a white raised centre with black specks, a surrounding thinner, more liquid portion and even a drip effect on the lowest margin ending with a little knob. The mimicry is enhanced by the fact that the spider emits an odour not unlike bird excreta.

== Discovery ==
Here is how the Scottish naturalist Henry Ogg Forbes described how he first came to discover the spider:

The first specimen I got was in West Java, while hunting one day for Lepidoptera. I observed a specimen of one of the Hesperidae sitting, as is often a custom of theirs, on the excreta of a bird on a leaf; I crept near it, intending to examine what they find in what one is inclined to consider incongruous food for a butterfly. I approached nearer and nearer, and at last caught it between my fingers, when I found that it had as I thought become glued by its feet to the mass; but on pulling gently the spider, to my amazement, disclosed itself by letting go its hold: only then did I discover that I was not looking on a veritable bird's excreta.

Later Forbes found another specimen on Sumatra and sent it back to Britain. He was a believer in Charles Darwin's theory of evolution through natural selection but found it difficult to understand how the mimicry of a variable object like a bird dropping could have evolved. The arachnologist Reverend Octavius Pickard-Cambridge brushed his doubts aside. The spider was not attempting to mimic the dropping and the web spun on the surface of the leaf was solely to anchor the spider in a position where it could await the arrival of winged prey. The fact that it then in some way resembled a bird dropping was fortuitous and natural selection merely acted to enhance the similarity.
