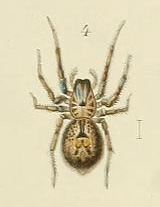
- female from original description

Scientific classification
- Kingdom: Animalia
- Phylum: Arthropoda
- Subphylum: Chelicerata
- Class: Arachnida
- Order: Araneae
- Infraorder: Araneomorphae
- Family: Lathyidae
- Genus: Andronova
- Species: A. annulata

Binomial name
- Andronova annulata (Bösenberg & Strand, 1906)

Synonyms
- Lathys annulata Bösenberg & Strand, 1906; Lathys novembris Dönitz & Strand, 1906

= Andronova annulata =

Species of spider

Andronova annulata is a species of spider in the family Dictynidae. It is found in Korea and Japan.

== Taxonomy ==
The species was originally described as Lathys annulata by Bösenberg and Strand in 1906 from Japan. A closely related form, Lathys novembris, was described by Dönitz and Strand in the same publication, but this was later considered a synonym of L. annulata.

In 2025, the species was transferred from the genus Lathys to Andronova by Montana and colleagues as part of a comprehensive revision of the family Dictynidae.

== Distribution ==
A. annulata is distributed across Korea and Japan, including Hokkaido, Honshu, Shikoku, and Kyushu.

== Description ==
Andronova annulata is a small spider with a body length of 2.0–2.5 mm in both sexes. The cephalothorax is blackish-brown in color, while the opisthosoma has a light brownish background with indistinct dark reddish-brown markings and scattered fine white spots. The legs are brownish with numerous dark rings or bands.

In females, the chelicerae bear two teeth on the anterior margin (promarginal teeth) and three teeth on the posterior margin of the cheliceral furrow.The epigyne has copulatory openings that come together to form a heart-shaped structure.

Males can be distinguished by their pedipalps, where the tip of the embolus is spirally coiled but relatively thin.
