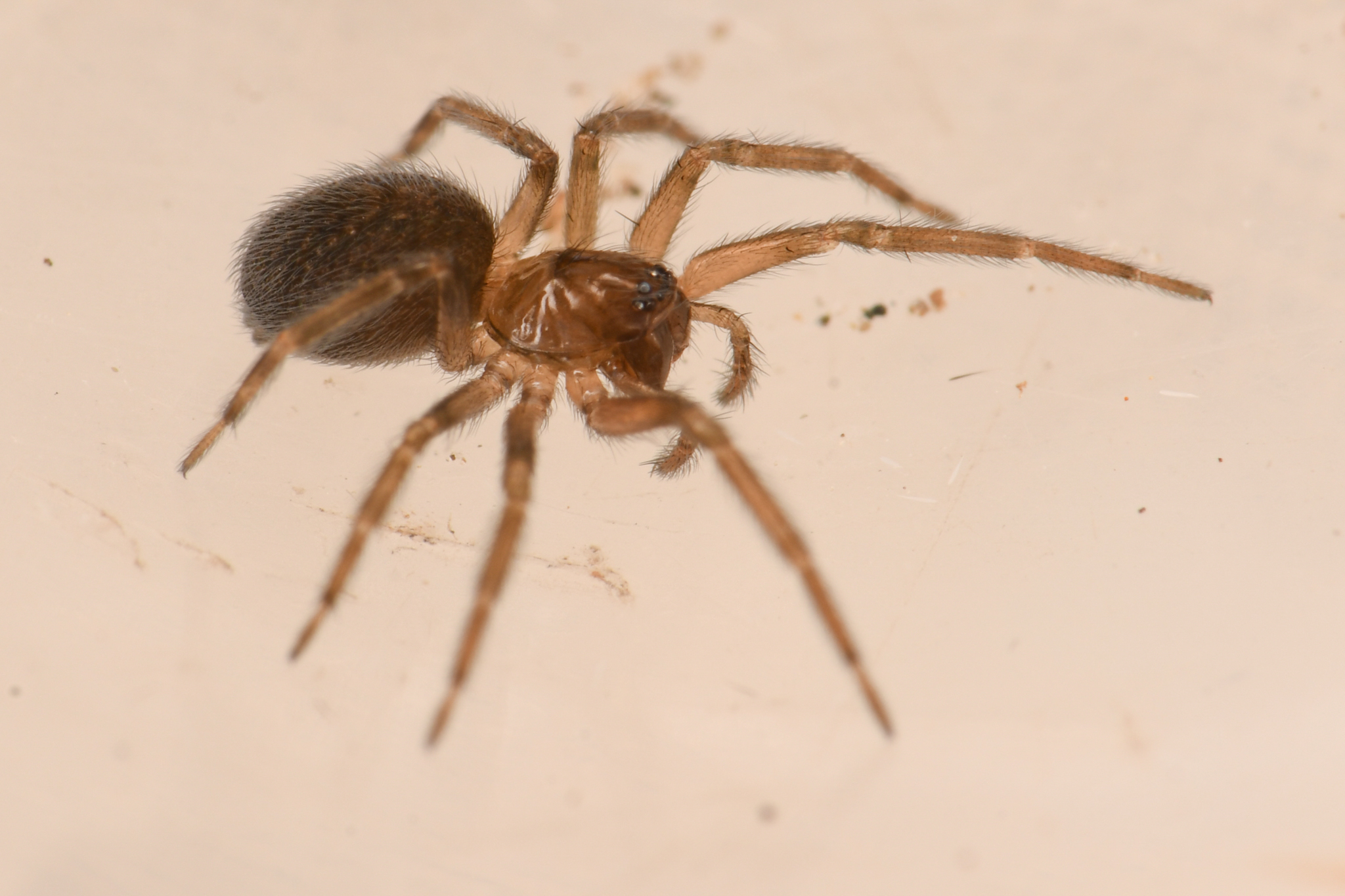
- Andronova alberta
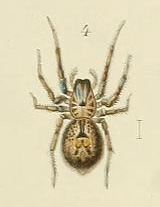
- Female A. annulata

Scientific classification
- Kingdom: Animalia
- Phylum: Arthropoda
- Subphylum: Chelicerata
- Class: Arachnida
- Order: Araneae
- Infraorder: Araneomorphae
- Family: Lathyidae
- Genus: Andronova; Cala-Riquelme, Montana & Esposito, 2025

Type species
- Andronova alberta (Gertsch, 1946)

Species
- 11 species (see text)

= Andronova =

Genus of spiders

Andronova is a genus of spiders in the family Lathyidae. The genus was established in 2025 when several species were transferred from the genus Lathys based on morphological and phylogenetic analyses.

== Etymology ==
The genus name Andronova refers to the Andronovo culture, a collection of late Bronze Age cultures (c. 2000–1150 BC) from Central Asia.

== Taxonomy ==
The genus Andronova was established in 2025 by Cala-Riquelme, Montana and Esposito as part of a comprehensive revision of the spider family Dictynidae sensu lato. The type species is Andronova alberta (Gertsch, 1946), originally described as Lathys alberta.

All eleven species currently assigned to Andronova were previously placed in the genus Lathys. The transfer was based on distinct morphological characteristics and molecular phylogenetic evidence that supported the recognition of this group as a separate evolutionary lineage.

== Description ==
Males of Andronova can be distinguished from other athyidae genera by having narrower anterior median eyes than anterior lateral eyes, and several other characteristics. The palpal tibia bears a lamellate lateral apophysis with a deep or shallow longitudinal furrow in addition to a retrolateral tibial apophysis and hook-shaped tibial process.

Females are characterized by a reduced secondary/accessory gland, elongated copulatory ducts, and fertilization ducts located mesally and distally between the copulatory duct and primary spermathecae.

== Distribution ==
Species of Andronova are distributed across multiple continents, with representatives found in North America, Asia, and North Africa. In North America, species occur in Alaska, Canada, and the United States. Asian species are found in Russia (from South Siberia to the Far East), China, Korea, Japan, and parts of Central Asia including Kazakhstan, Uzbekistan, Kyrgyzstan, and Tajikistan. Some species extend into the Middle East (Israel, Iran) and the Caucasus region (Georgia, Azerbaijan), while North African representation includes Algeria and Tunisia. European populations are limited to parts of Eastern Europe (Ukraine, European Russia, Bulgaria) and the Mediterranean region (Italy, Greece, Cyprus).

== Species ==
As of September 2025, the genus Andronova contains eleven species:

- Andronova alberta (Gertsch, 1946) – Russia, Alaska, Canada, USA
- Andronova annulata (Bösenberg & Strand, 1906) – Korea, Japan
- Andronova arabs (Simon, 1910) – Algeria, Tunisia, Italy, Greece, Cyprus
- Andronova cambridgei (Simon, 1874) – Israel
- Andronova dihamata (Paik, 1979) – Korea, Japan
- Andronova lehtineni (Kovblyuk, Kastrygina & Omelko, 2014) – Ukraine, Russia, Kazakhstan, Georgia, Iran
- Andronova maculosa (Karsch, 1879) – Korea, Japan
- Andronova spasskyi (Andreeva & Tystshenko, 1969) – Bulgaria, Turkey, Georgia, Azerbaijan, Iran, Kazakhstan, Uzbekistan, Kyrgyzstan, Tajikistan
- Andronova subalberta (Z. S. Zhang, Hu & Y. G. Zhang, 2012) – China
- Andronova subviridis (Denis, 1937) – Algeria
- Andronova sylvania (Chamberlin & Gertsch, 1958) – USA
