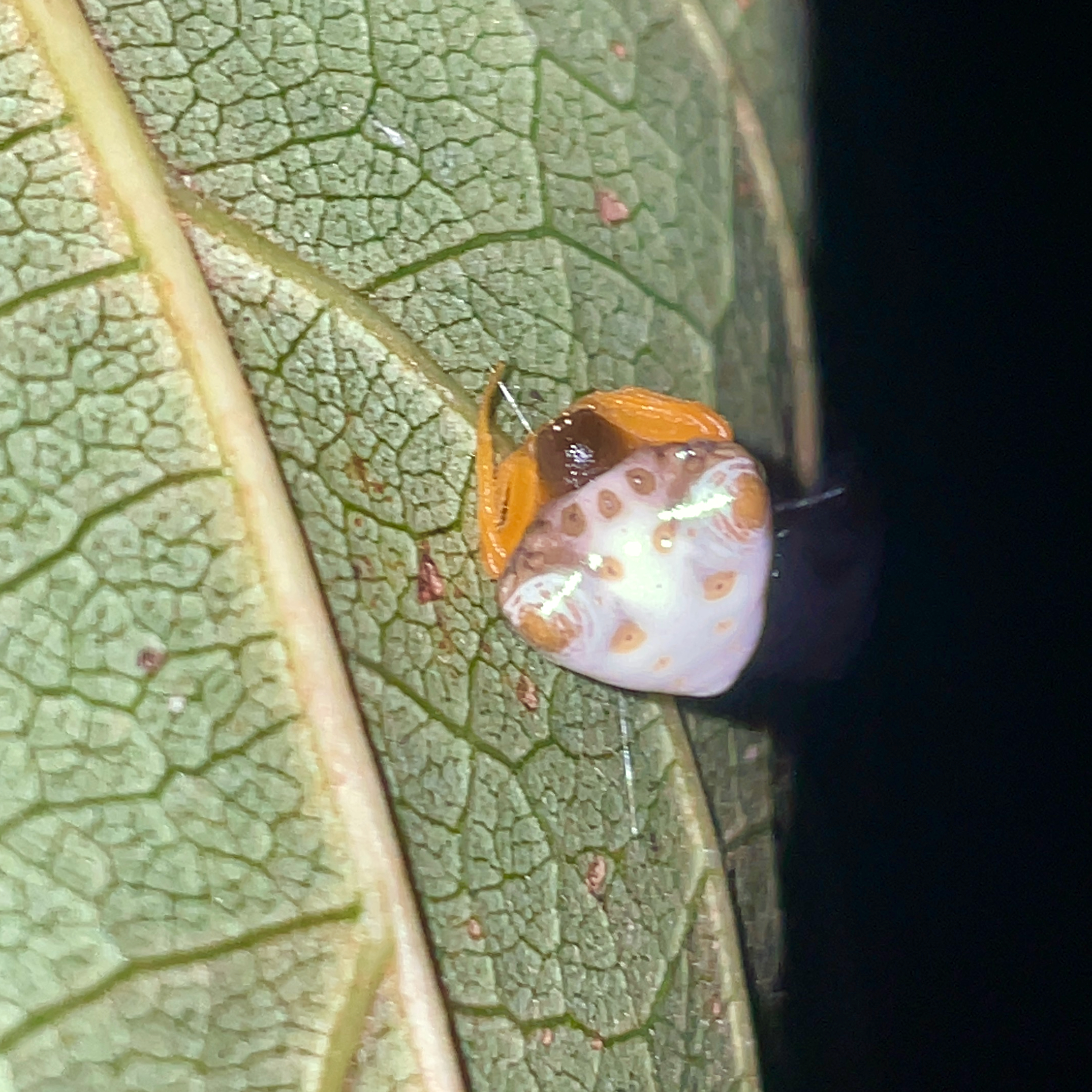
- female C. bufo from Japan

Scientific classification
- Kingdom: Animalia
- Phylum: Arthropoda
- Subphylum: Chelicerata
- Class: Arachnida
- Order: Araneae
- Infraorder: Araneomorphae
- Family: Araneidae
- Genus: Cyrtarachne
- Species: C. bufo

Binomial name
- Cyrtarachne bufo (Bösenberg & Strand, 1906)

Synonyms
- Poecilopachys bufo Bösenberg & Strand, 1906

= Cyrtarachne bufo =

Lesser Bird-dropping Spider

Species of spider

Cyrtarachne bufo is a species of spider in the family Araneidae (orb-weaver spiders). It is found in China, Korea, and Japan. The species is commonly known as the lesser bird-dropping spider due to its appearance and behavior that mimics bird droppings.

The specific epithet bufo means "toad" in Latin, referring to the spider's warty appearance.

== Taxonomy ==
The species was originally described as Poecilopachys bufo by Bösenberg and Strand in 1906. It was later transferred to the genus Cyrtarachne by Yaginuma in 1958.

== Distribution ==
C. bufo has been recorded from China, Korea, and Japan. The species appears to be mature during summer and autumn seasons.

== Description ==
Cyrtarachne bufo shows significant sexual dimorphism, with females being considerably larger than males.

=== Females ===
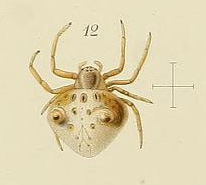
drawing of female from 1906 paper

Adult females have a total length of 8-10 mm, with the opisthosoma measuring 6.5 mm in length and 7 mm in width. The cephalothorax is light brown on the head region and sides of the thoracic portion, with two darker lines extending from the posterior median eyes over the head. The central portion of the thoracic region and the margins are yellow, as are all the extremities. The labium is broader than long, anteriorly arched, with the maxillae broadly widened at the ends, nearly rectangular, anteriorly straight, and finely bordered in black.

The opisthosoma is predominantly white, with the area above the two broad but shallow tubercles being brownish grey. In addition to the points described on living specimens, there are five additional points above each tubercle connected by brown stripes forming a characteristic pattern. The entire ventral surface appears yellow, with only the sides being transversely striped. The median area is smooth with three pairs of very fine, indented points. A broad, dark brown arc extends from the genital opening to the lower spinnerets. The very small epigyne is reddish with a whitish central protrusion.

=== Males ===
Males are significantly smaller than females, measuring 1.0-2.5 mm in total length.
