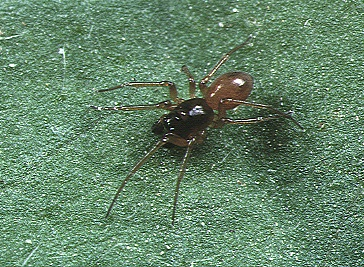
- U. insecticeps, male

Scientific classification
- Kingdom: Animalia
- Phylum: Arthropoda
- Subphylum: Chelicerata
- Class: Arachnida
- Order: Araneae
- Infraorder: Araneomorphae
- Family: Linyphiidae
- Genus: Ummeliata; Strand, 1942

Type species
- U. insecticeps (Bösenberg & Strand, 1906)

Species
- 10, see text

= Ummeliata =

Genus of spiders

Ummeliata is a genus of Asian sheet weavers that was first described by Embrik Strand in 1942.

== Species ==
As of August 2021 it contains ten species:

- Ummeliata angulituberis (Oi, 1960) – Russia, Korea, Japan
- Ummeliata erigonoides (Oi, 1960) – Japan
- Ummeliata feminea (Bösenberg & Strand, 1906) – Russia, China, Korea, Japan
- Ummeliata insecticeps (Bösenberg & Strand, 1906) (type) – Russia to Vietnam, Taiwan, Japan
- Ummeliata jambi Tanasevitch, 2020 – Indonesia (Sumatra)
- Ummeliata onoi Saito, 1993 – Japan
- Ummeliata osakaensis (Oi, 1960) – Russia, Japan
- Ummeliata saitoi Matsuda & Ono, 2001 – Japan
- Ummeliata sibirica (Eskov, 1980) – Russia
- Ummeliata xiaowutai Han & Zhang, 2014 – China
