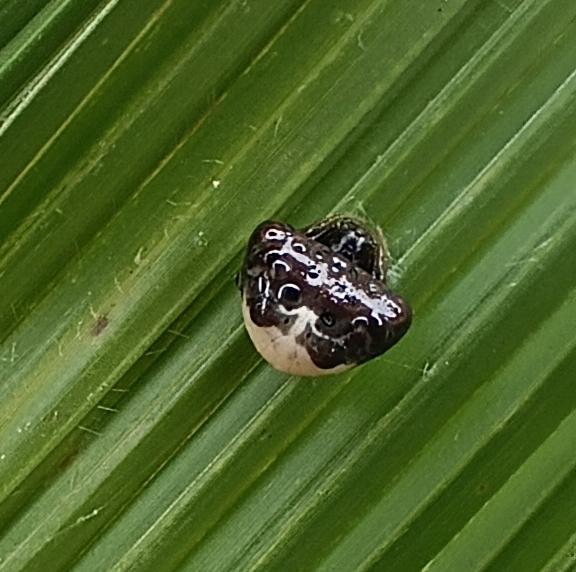
- A. olivaceus

Scientific classification
- Kingdom: Animalia
- Phylum: Arthropoda
- Subphylum: Chelicerata
- Class: Arachnida
- Order: Araneae
- Infraorder: Araneomorphae
- Family: Araneidae
- Genus: Aethriscus; Pocock, 1902

Type species
- A. olivaceus Pocock, 1902

Species
- A. olivaceus Pocock, 1902; A. pani Lessert, 1930

= Aethriscus =

Genus of spiders

Aethriscus is a genus of African orb-weaver spiders first described by Reginald Innes Pocock in 1902. The two described species are found in the DR Congo. One of them was later also found in South Africa.

They are rare spiders and resemble Cyrtarachne.

== Description ==
The total length of females ranges from 7 to 10 mm, while the size of males remains unknown.

When viewed from above, the body displays a triangular shape. The carapace is olive-brown in color and appears smooth and shiny, featuring a small tubercle positioned at the level of the cephalic region constriction, while the median ocular area is narrower at the front. The abdomen has a shiny appearance and is olive yellow with darker humps, maintaining a triangular shape with a straight anterior border that contains 11 sigilla and blunt round humps, while the posterior area appears paler in color.

The legs are olive-brown, very short in length, and fold around the body.

== Species ==
As of October 2026, this genus includes two species:

- Aethriscus olivaceus Pocock, 1902 – DR Congo, South Africa (type species)
- Aethriscus pani Lessert, 1930 – DR Congo
