= Yaginumena =

Scientific classification
- Kingdom: Animalia
- Phylum: Arthropoda
- Subphylum: Chelicerata
- Class: Arachnida
- Order: Araneae
- Infraorder: Araneomorphae
- Family: Theridiidae
- Genus: Yaginumena; Yoshida, 2002

Type species
- Y. castrata (Bösenberg & Strand, 1906)

Species
- Y. castrata (Bösenberg & Strand, 1906) – Russia (Far East), China, Korea, Japan; Y. maculosa (Yoshida & Ono, 2000) – Turkey, Caucasus (Georgia, Azerbaijan), India, China, Korea, Japan; Y. mutilata (Bösenberg & Strand, 1906) – Korea, Japan

Genus of spiders

Yaginumena is a genus of comb-footed spiders that was first described by H. Yoshida in 2002. As of June 2020 it contains three species, found in Asia and Turkey: Y. castrata, Y. maculosa, and Y. mutilata.
