= Yaginumena mutilata =

Scientific classification
- Kingdom: Animalia
- Phylum: Arthropoda
- Subphylum: Chelicerata
- Class: Arachnida
- Order: Araneae
- Infraorder: Araneomorphae
- Family: Theridiidae
- Genus: Yaginumena
- Species: Y. mutilata

Binomial name
- Yaginumena mutilata (Bösenberg & Strand, 1906)

Species of spider

Yaginumena mutiliata is a species of comb-footed spider in the family Theridiidae. It is found in Japan and Korea.
