= Asialathys =

Scientific classification
- Kingdom: Animalia
- Phylum: Arthropoda
- Subphylum: Chelicerata
- Class: Arachnida
- Order: Araneae
- Infraorder: Araneomorphae
- Family: Lathyidae
- Genus: Asialathys; Cala-Riquelme & Crews, 2025

Type species
- Lathys spiralis Z. S. Zhang, Hu & Y. G. Zhang, 2012

Species
- 5, see text

Genus of spiders

Asialathys is a genus of spiders in the family Lathyidae.

== Distribution ==
All described species of Asialathys are endemic to China.

== Etymology ==
The genus name indicates that this is an Asian genus, related to Lathys.

== Taxonomy ==
All species in this genus were transferred from Lathys in 2025.

== Species ==
As of October 2025, this genus includes five species:

- Asialathys deltoidea (Liu, 2018) – China
- Asialathys fibulata (Liu, 2018) – China
- Asialathys huangyangjieensis (Liu, 2018) – China
- Asialathys spiralis (Z. S. Zhang, Hu & Y. G. Zhang, 2012) – China (type species)
- Asialathys zhanfengi (Liu, 2018) – China
