= Yunohamella yunohamensis =

Scientific classification
- Kingdom: Animalia
- Phylum: Arthropoda
- Subphylum: Chelicerata
- Class: Arachnida
- Order: Araneae
- Infraorder: Araneomorphae
- Family: Theridiidae
- Genus: Yunohamella
- Species: Y. yunohamensis

Binomial name
- Yunohamella yunohamensis (Bösenberg & Strand, 1906)

Species of spider

Yunohamella yunohamensis is a species of comb-footed spider in the family Theridiidae. The species inhabits the far east of Russia, Korea, and Japan.
