= Afrolathys =

Scientific classification
- Kingdom: Animalia
- Phylum: Arthropoda
- Subphylum: Chelicerata
- Class: Arachnida
- Order: Araneae
- Infraorder: Araneomorphae
- Family: Lathyidae
- Genus: Afrolathys; Cala-Riquelme, Al-Jamal & Esposito, 2025

Type species
- A. tanzanica Cala-Riquelme, Al-Jamal & Esposito, 2025

Species
- 2, see text

Genus of spiders

Afrolathys is a genus of spiders in the family Lathyidae.

== Distribution ==
Afrolathys is known from Tanzania and Madagascar.

== Etymology ==
The genus name indicates that this in an African genus and related to genus Lathys.

== Species ==
As of October 2025, this genus includes two species:

- Afrolathys madagascariensis Al-Jamal & Cala-Riquelme, 2025 – Madagascar
- Afrolathys tanzanica Cala-Riquelme, Al-Jamal & Esposito, 2025 – Tanzania (type species)
