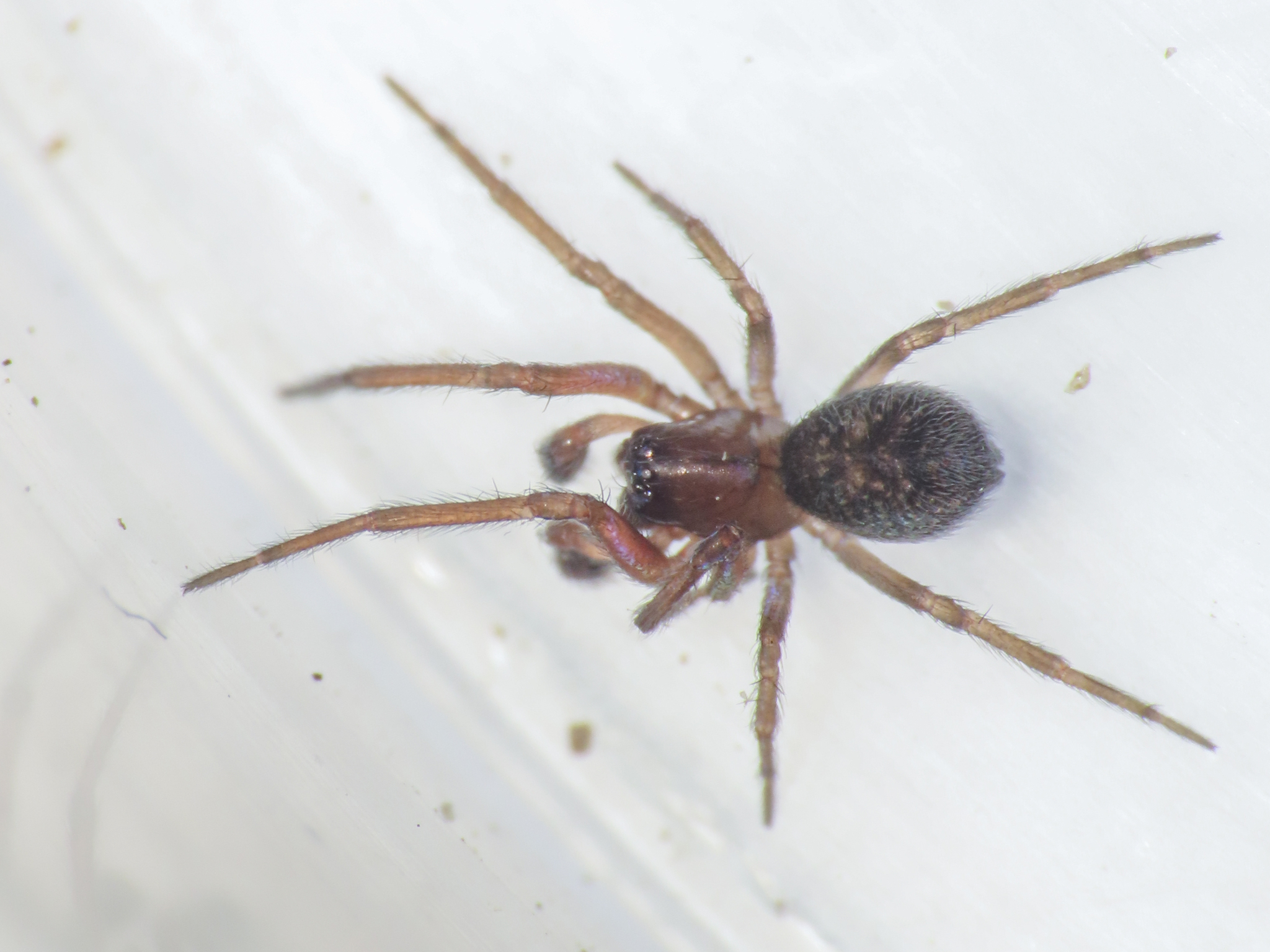
- T. stigmatisata
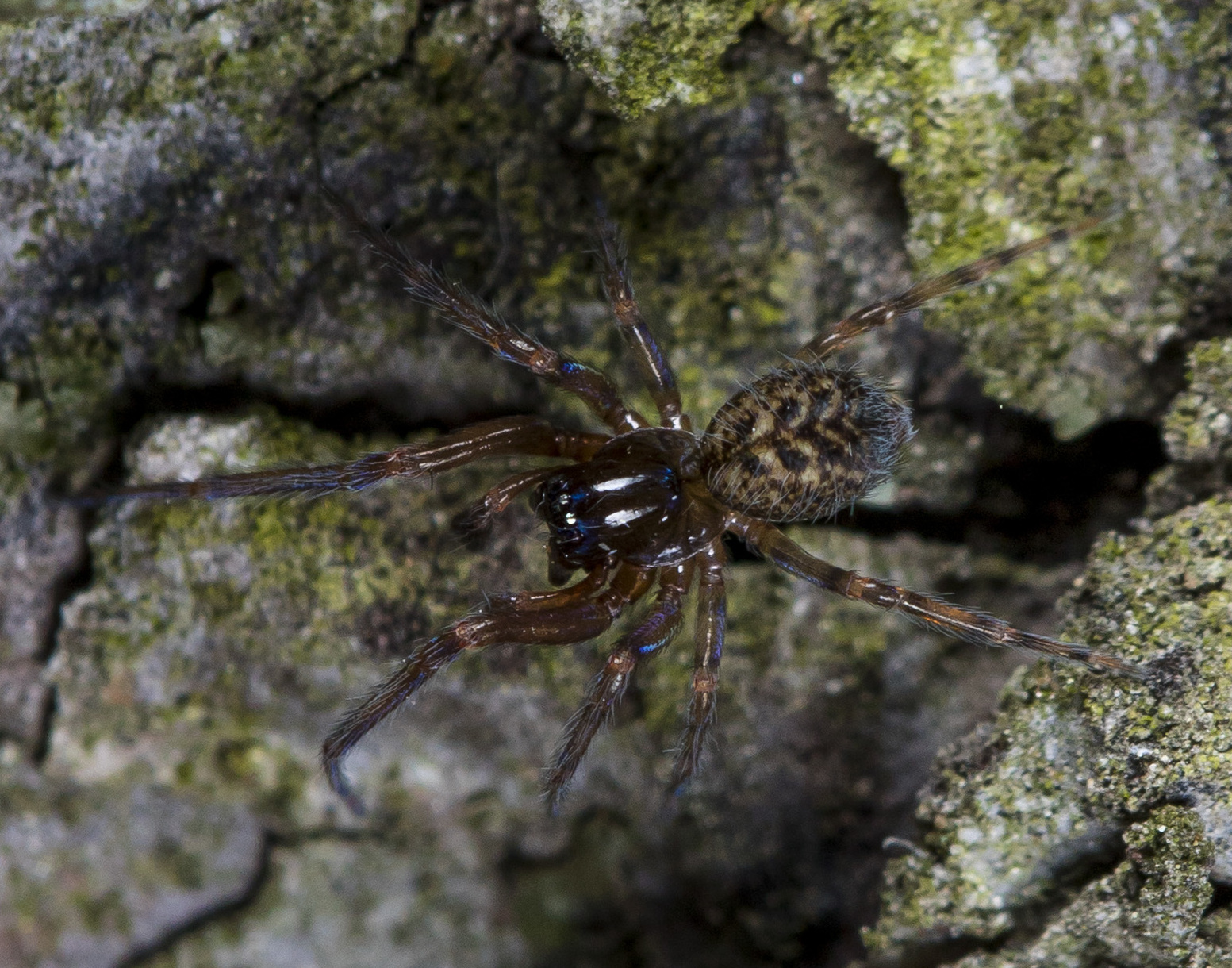
- T. truncata

Scientific classification
- Kingdom: Animalia
- Phylum: Arthropoda
- Subphylum: Chelicerata
- Class: Arachnida
- Order: Araneae
- Infraorder: Araneomorphae
- Family: Lathyidae
- Genus: Tolokonniella; Cala-Riquelme, Crews & Esposito, 2025

Type species
- Lethia stigmatisata Menge, 1869

Species
- 5, see text

= Tolokonniella =

Genus of spiders

Tolokonniella is a genus of spiders in the family Lathyidae.

== Distribution ==
Tolokonniella is found from Spain to Kazakhstan and South Siberia, with T. maura reaching to Algeria.

== Etymology ==
The genus name honors Russian artist and feminist Nadezhda Andreyevna Tolokonnikova, a founding member of the feminist group Pussy Riot.

== Taxonomy ==
All species in this genus were transferred from Lathys in 2025.

== Species ==
As of October 2025, this genus includes five species:

- Tolokonniella ankaraensis (Özkütük, Marusik, Elverici & Kunt, 2016) – Turkey
- Tolokonniella mallorcensis (Lissner, 2018) – Spain (Majorca)
- Tolokonniella maura (Simon, 1911) – Algeria, Spain (Balearic Islands)
- Tolokonniella stigmatisata (Menge, 1869) – Europe, Turkey (type species)
- Tolokonniella truncata (Danilov, 1994) – Russia (Central Asia, South Siberia), Kazakhstan
