= Diplocephaloides =

Scientific classification
- Kingdom: Animalia
- Phylum: Arthropoda
- Subphylum: Chelicerata
- Class: Arachnida
- Order: Araneae
- Infraorder: Araneomorphae
- Family: Linyphiidae
- Genus: Diplocephaloides; Oi, 1960

Type species
- D. saganus (Bösenberg & Strand, 1906)

Species
- D. falcatus Seo, 2018 – Korea; D. saganus (Bösenberg & Strand, 1906) – Korea, Japan; D. uncatus Song & Li, 2010 – China

Genus of spiders

Diplocephaloides is a genus of Asian dwarf spiders that was first described by R. Oi in 1960. As of May 2021 it contains three species: D. saganus, D. uncatus and the recently described D. falcatus.
