= Denticulathys =

Scientific classification
- Kingdom: Animalia
- Phylum: Arthropoda
- Subphylum: Chelicerata
- Class: Arachnida
- Order: Araneae
- Infraorder: Araneomorphae
- Family: Lathyidae
- Genus: Denticulathys; Cala-Riquelme, Al-Jamal & Crews, 2025
- Species: D. amaataaidoo

Binomial name
- Denticulathys amaataaidoo Cala-Riquelme, Al-Jamal & Crews, 2025

Species of spider

Denticulathys is a monotypic genus of African spiders in the family Lathyidae containing the single species, Denticulathys amaataaidoo.

== Distribution ==
Denticulathys amaataaidoo has been recorded from the Central African Republic and Gabon.

== Etymology ==
The genus name is a combination of Latin "dent-" (tooth), referring to the denticulation observed on the patellar apophysis of the male palp, and the related genus Lathys.

The specific name honors Ghanaian author, academic and politician Ama Ata Aidoo.
