= Draposa lyrivulva =

Scientific classification
- Kingdom: Animalia
- Phylum: Arthropoda
- Subphylum: Chelicerata
- Class: Arachnida
- Order: Araneae
- Infraorder: Araneomorphae
- Family: Lycosidae
- Genus: Draposa
- Species: D. lyrivulva

Binomial name
- Draposa lyrivulva (Bösenberg & Strand, 1906)

Synonyms
- Pardosa leucopalpis

Species of spider

Draposa lyrivulva, is a species of spider of the genus Draposa. It is native to Pakistan, India and Sri Lanka. Its presence in Japan is doubtful, and therefore excluded from their Japanese spiders checklist.
