= Analtella =

Scientific classification
- Kingdom: Animalia
- Phylum: Arthropoda
- Subphylum: Chelicerata
- Class: Arachnida
- Order: Araneae
- Infraorder: Araneomorphae
- Family: Lathyidae
- Genus: Analtella; Denis, 1947

Type species
- A. brevitarsis Denis, 1947

Species
- 5, see text

Synonyms
- Lathys Simon, 1885

Genus of spiders

Analtella is a genus of spiders in the family Lathyidae.

The genus Analtella is found in the Mediterranean region and Atlantic islands, with three species occurring in the Canary Islands, two in the Azores, and two in Iberia and southern Europe.

As of January 2026, this genus includes five species:

- Analtella affinis (Blackwall, 1862) – Azores, Canary Islands, Madeira, Portugal, Greece
- Analtella dentichelis (Simon, 1883) – Azores, Canary Islands
- Analtella narbonensis (Simon, 1876) – Portugal, Spain, France, Italy
- Analtella pygmaea (Wunderlich, 2011) – Canary Islands
- Analtella teideensis (Wunderlich, 1992) – Canary Islands
