= Takayus =

Scientific classification
- Kingdom: Animalia
- Phylum: Arthropoda
- Subphylum: Chelicerata
- Class: Arachnida
- Order: Araneae
- Infraorder: Araneomorphae
- Family: Theridiidae
- Genus: Takayus; Yoshida, 2001

Type species
- T. takayensis (Saito, 1939)

Species
- 17, see text

Genus of spiders

Takayus is a genus of Asian comb-footed spiders (family Theridiidae) that was first described by H. Yoshida in 2001.

== Species ==
As of June 2020 it contains seventeen species, found in Asia:

- Takayus chikunii (Yaginuma, 1960) – China, Japan
- Takayus codomaculatus Yin, 2012 – China
- Takayus fujisawai Yoshida, 2002 – Japan
- Takayus huanrenensis (Zhu & Gao, 1993) – China
- Takayus kunmingicus (Zhu, 1998) – China
- Takayus latifolius (Yaginuma, 1960) – Russia (Far East), China, Korea, Japan
- Takayus linimaculatus (Zhu, 1998) – China
- Takayus lunulatus (Guan & Zhu, 1993) – Russia (Far East), China, Korea
- Takayus lushanensis (Zhu, 1998) – China
- Takayus naevius (Zhu, 1998) – China
- Takayus papiliomaculatus Yin, Peng & Zhang, 2005 – China
- Takayus quadrimaculatus (Song & Kim, 1991) – China, Korea
- Takayus simplicus Yin, 2012 – China
- Takayus sublatifolius (Zhu, 1998) – China
- Takayus takayensis (Saito, 1939) (type) – China, Korea, Japan
- Takayus wangi (Zhu, 1998) – China
- Takayus xui (Zhu, 1998) – China

Formerly included:

- T. lyricus (Walckenaer, 1841) (Transferred to Yunohamella)
- T. subadultus (Bösenberg & Strand, 1906) (Transferred to Yunohamella)
- T. yunohamensis (Bösenberg & Strand, 1906) (Transferred to Yunohamella)

In synonymy:

- T. wolmerensis (Paik, 1996) = Takayus quadrimaculatus (Song & Kim, 1991)
