= Paratmeticus =

Scientific classification
- Kingdom: Animalia
- Phylum: Arthropoda
- Subphylum: Chelicerata
- Class: Arachnida
- Order: Araneae
- Infraorder: Araneomorphae
- Family: Linyphiidae
- Genus: Paratmeticus; Marusik & Koponen, 2010
- Species: P. bipunctis

Binomial name
- Paratmeticus bipunctis (Bösenberg & Strand, 1906)

Genus of spiders

Paratmeticus is a monotypic genus of Asian dwarf spiders containing the single species, Paratmeticus bipunctis. It was first described by Y. M. Marusik & S. Koponen in 2010, and has only been found in Russia and Japan.
