= Draposa subhadrae =

Scientific classification
- Kingdom: Animalia
- Phylum: Arthropoda
- Subphylum: Chelicerata
- Class: Arachnida
- Order: Araneae
- Infraorder: Araneomorphae
- Family: Lycosidae
- Genus: Draposa
- Species: D. subhadrae

Binomial name
- Draposa subhadrae (Patel & Reddy, 1993)

Species of spider

Draposa subhadrae, is a species of spider of the genus Draposa. It is native to India and Sri Lanka.
