= Takayus fujisawai =

Scientific classification
- Kingdom: Animalia
- Phylum: Arthropoda
- Subphylum: Chelicerata
- Class: Arachnida
- Order: Araneae
- Infraorder: Araneomorphae
- Family: Theridiidae
- Genus: Takayus
- Species: T. fujisawai

Binomial name
- Takayus fujisawai Yoshida, 2002

Species of spider

Takayus fujisawai is a species of comb-footed spider in the family Theridiidae. It is found in Japan.
