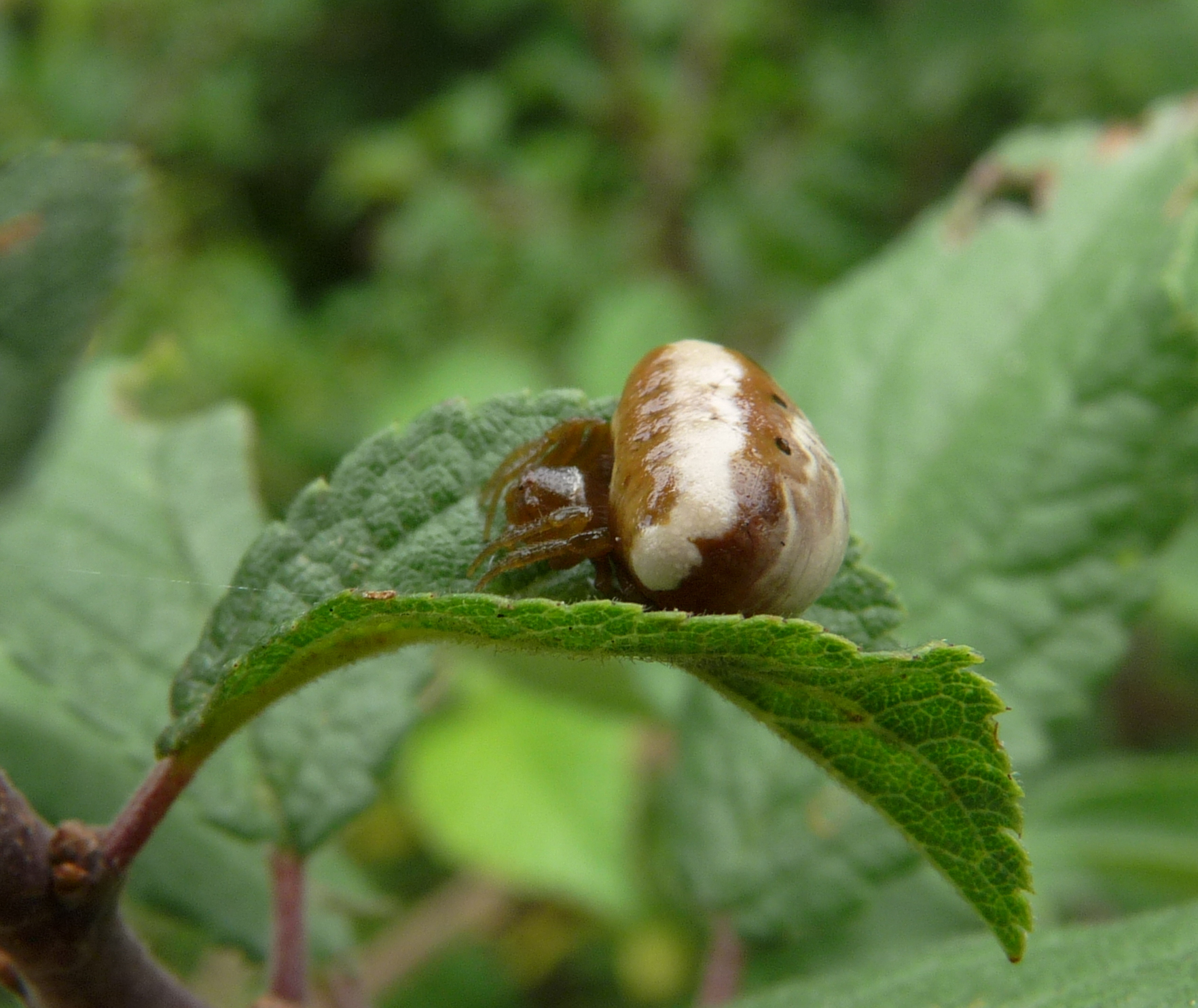
- Near Livorno, Tuscany, Italy
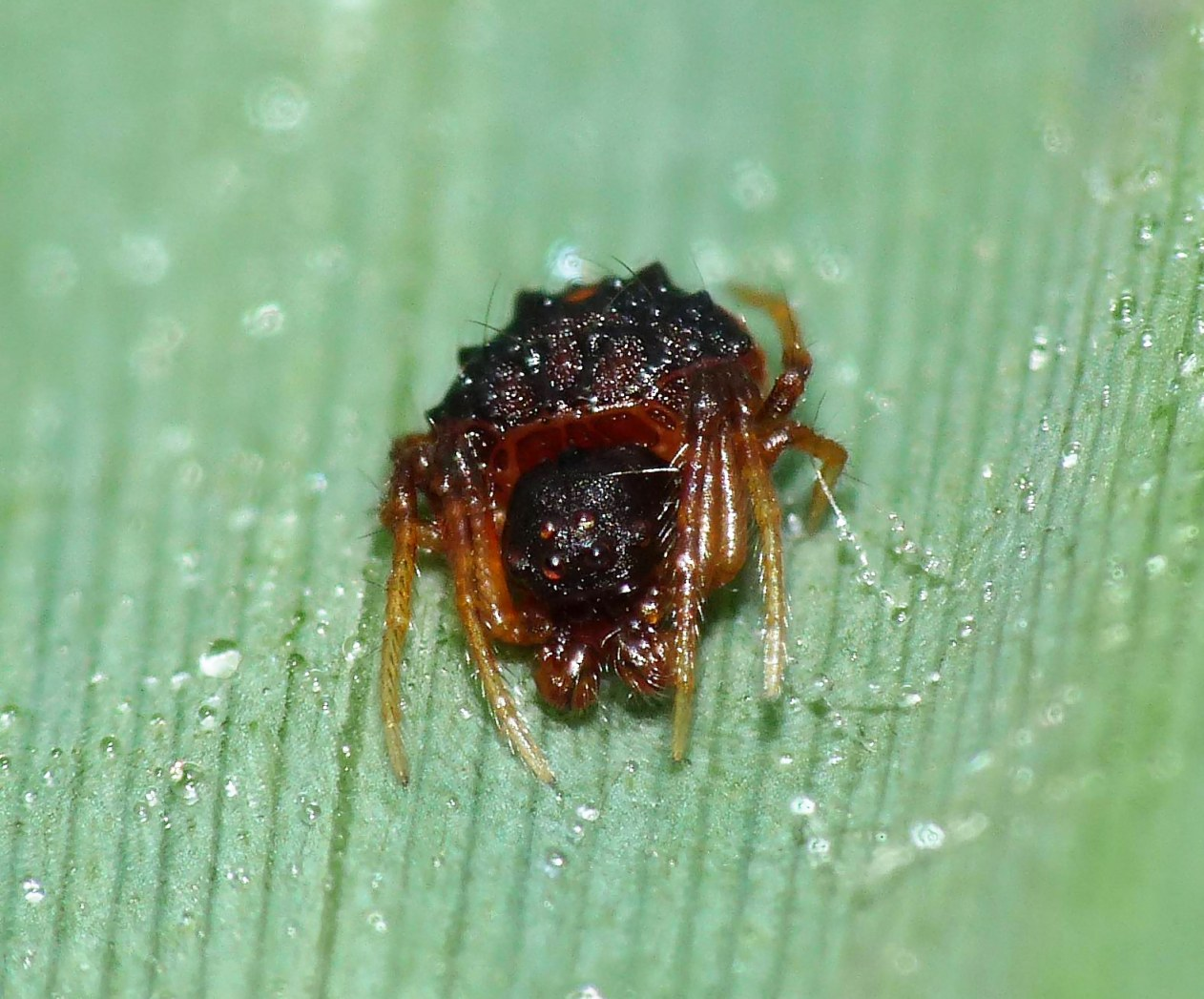
- male

Scientific classification
- Kingdom: Animalia
- Phylum: Arthropoda
- Subphylum: Chelicerata
- Class: Arachnida
- Order: Araneae
- Infraorder: Araneomorphae
- Family: Araneidae
- Genus: Cyrtarachne
- Species: C. ixoides

Binomial name
- Cyrtarachne ixoides (Simon, 1870)

Synonyms
- Peltosoma ixoides Simon, 1870; Peltosoma tuberculiferum Simon, 1870; Peniza europaea Ausserer, 1871; Cyrtarachne tuberculiferum (Simon, 1870); Cyrtarachne ixodoides Brignoli, 1967

= Cyrtarachne ixoides =

Bird Dropping Araneid Spider

Species of spider

Cyrtarachne ixoides is a species of spider in the family Araneidae. It has a wide global distribution from the Mediterranean basin to Georgia and Madagascar, and is commonly known as the bird dropping araneid spider.

== Distribution ==
Cyrtarachne ixoides has been recorded from the Mediterranean basin to Georgia and Madagascar. In South Africa, it is known from four provinces at altitudes ranging from 16 to 1656 m above sea level.

== Habitat and ecology ==
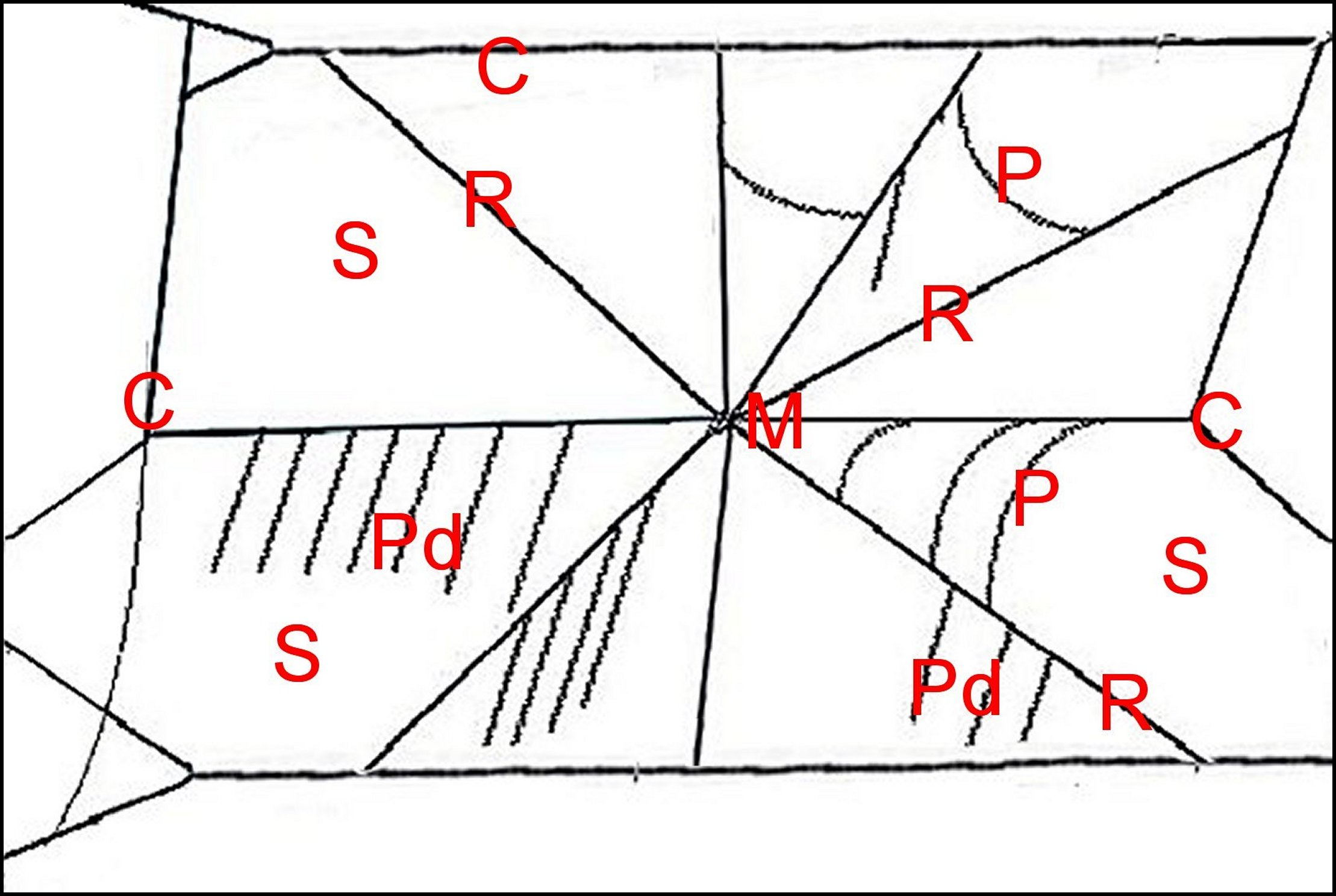
web schema

The species inhabits the Grassland biome. They construct "spanning thread-webs", a basic orb web, but the web diameter, sticky spiral spacing and viscid thread diameter differ from that of typical orb webs. The viscid threads are studded with large droplets. Each of the short threads between the radii is known as a spanning thread, and is unique in that it breaks when prey comes into contact with it. The prey flies into the web, gets stuck to a viscid thread, the thread breaks, and the spider pulls the prey up to the hub of the web to feed. During the day the spider rests on close-by vegetation mimicking bird droppings.

== Description ==
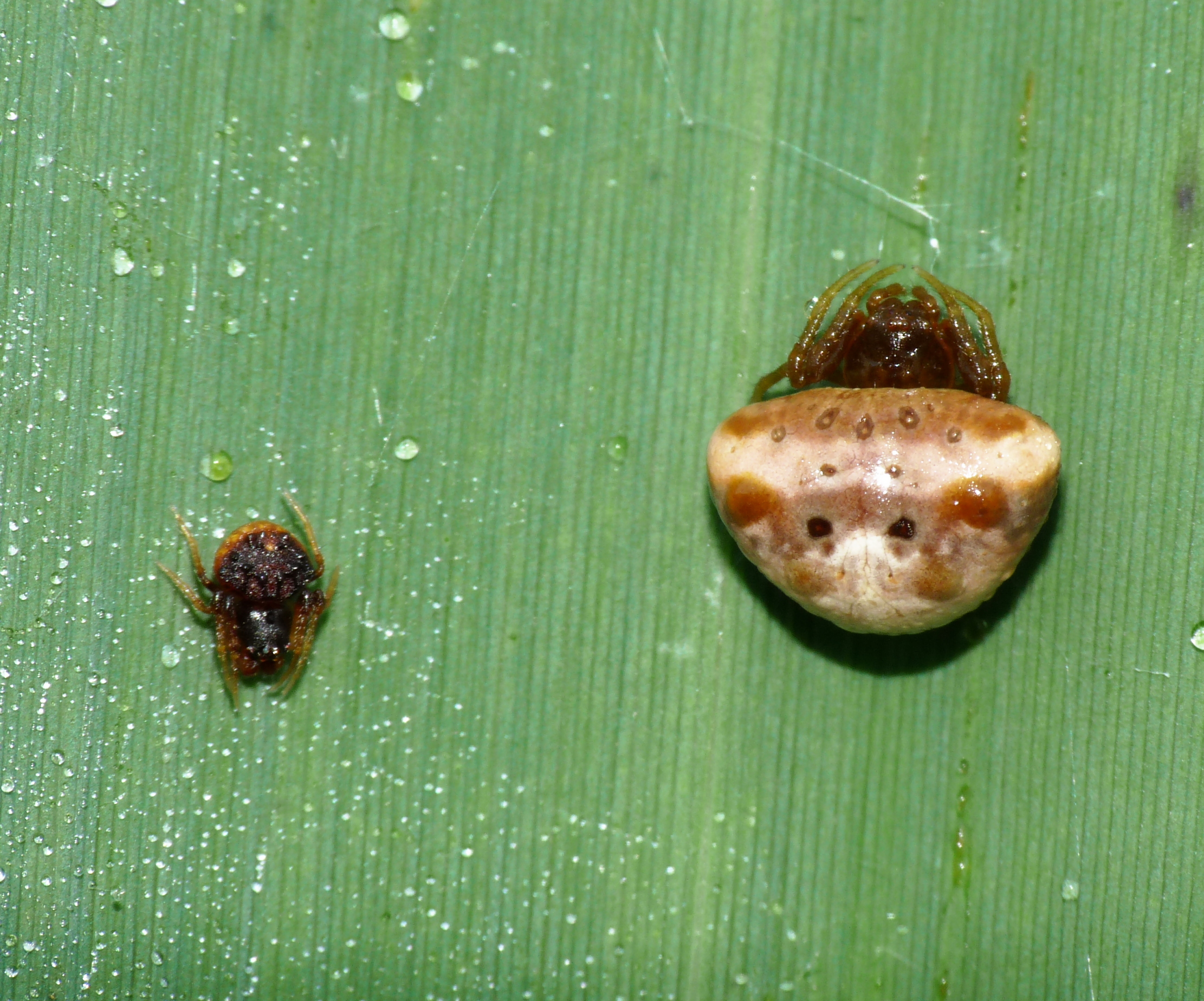
male and female

== Conservation ==
Cyrtarachne ixoides is listed as Least Concern by the South African National Biodiversity Institute due to its wide distribution. The species is protected in Dukuduku Forest, Isandlwane Nature Reserve and Mpetsane Conservation Estate.

== Taxonomy ==
The species was originally described by Eugène Simon in 1870 as Peltosoma ixoides. It was later transferred to the genus Cyrtarachne. The species has not been revised and is known from both sexes.
