= Cyrtarachne sunjoymongai =

Scientific classification
- Kingdom: Animalia
- Phylum: Arthropoda
- Subphylum: Chelicerata
- Class: Arachnida
- Order: Araneae
- Infraorder: Araneomorphae
- Family: Araneidae
- Genus: Cyrtarachne
- Species: C. sunjoymongai

Binomial name
- Cyrtarachne sunjoymongai Ahmed, Sumukha, Khalap, Mohan & Jadhav, 2015

Species of spider

Cyrtarachne sunjoymongai is a species of orb-weaver spider from the forests of the Western Ghats of Karnataka, India. It was first formally named in 2015, after naturalist and photographer Sunjoy Monga.
