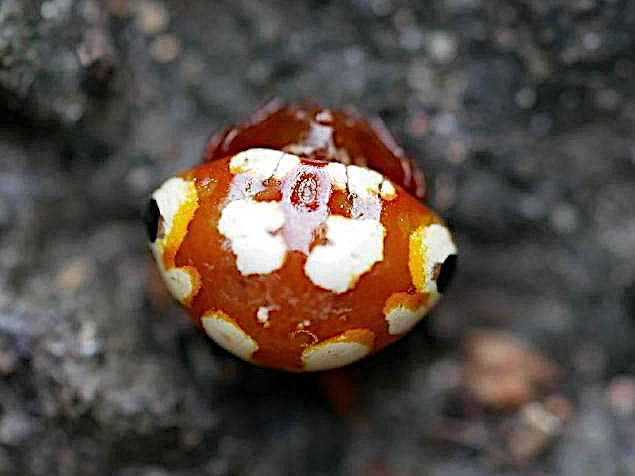

Scientific classification
- Kingdom: Animalia
- Phylum: Arthropoda
- Subphylum: Chelicerata
- Class: Arachnida
- Order: Araneae
- Infraorder: Araneomorphae
- Family: Araneidae
- Genus: Cyrtarachne
- Species: C. yunoharuensis

Binomial name
- Cyrtarachne yunoharuensis Strand, 1918

= Cyrtarachne yunoharuensis =

Species of spider

Cyrtarachne yunoharuensis is a species of spider in the orb-weaver spider family Araneidae, found in China, Korea and Japan. Spiders in the genus Cyrtarachne construct "spanning-thread webs" rather than the more typical orb webs of the family Araneidae. These webs have a small number of radii and instead of a tight spiral of sticky threads, the sticky spanning threads are widely spaced and do not form a spiral. When prey is caught on one of the spanning threads, one end comes loose, and the prey, often a moth, dangles from the other end until hauled in by the spider.

== Description ==
The female is 5–7 mm long. The carapace is wider than long and light reddish brown. The sternum is also reddish brown, whereas the legs are yellowish brown. The abdomen is broad, wider than long, and is reddish with six main pairs of white markings. The pair in the middle of the side of the abdomen have a dark central mark and resemble eyeballs. The underside of the abdomen is red. The epigyne has no scape. The male is smaller, 1.5–2 mm long. It is darker than the female and lacks the abdominal pattern. The median apophysis of the palpal bulb is curved and has a pointed tip.

== Taxonomy ==
Cyrtarachne yunoharuensis was first described by Embrik Strand in 1918. Strand included drawings, but said that further details or a description were not available. It was collected in Yunoharu, in Kumamoto Prefecture. The genus Cyrtarachne was included in molecular phylogenetic studies in 2014 and 2020 which placed it in the "cyrtarachnines" in the subfamily Cyrtarachninae s.l.
