= Draposa atropalpis =

Scientific classification
- Kingdom: Animalia
- Phylum: Arthropoda
- Subphylum: Chelicerata
- Class: Arachnida
- Order: Araneae
- Infraorder: Araneomorphae
- Family: Lycosidae
- Genus: Draposa
- Species: D. atropalpis

Binomial name
- Draposa atropalpis (Gravely, 1924)

Species of spider

Draposa atropalpis is a species of spiders of the genus Draposa. It is native to India and Sri Lanka.
