= Yunohamella takasukai =

Scientific classification
- Kingdom: Animalia
- Phylum: Arthropoda
- Subphylum: Chelicerata
- Class: Arachnida
- Order: Araneae
- Infraorder: Araneomorphae
- Family: Theridiidae
- Genus: Yunohamella
- Species: Y. takasukai

Binomial name
- Yunohamella takasukai Yoshida, 2012

Species of spider

Yunohamella takasukai is a species of comb-footed spider in the family Theridiidae. It is found in Java.
