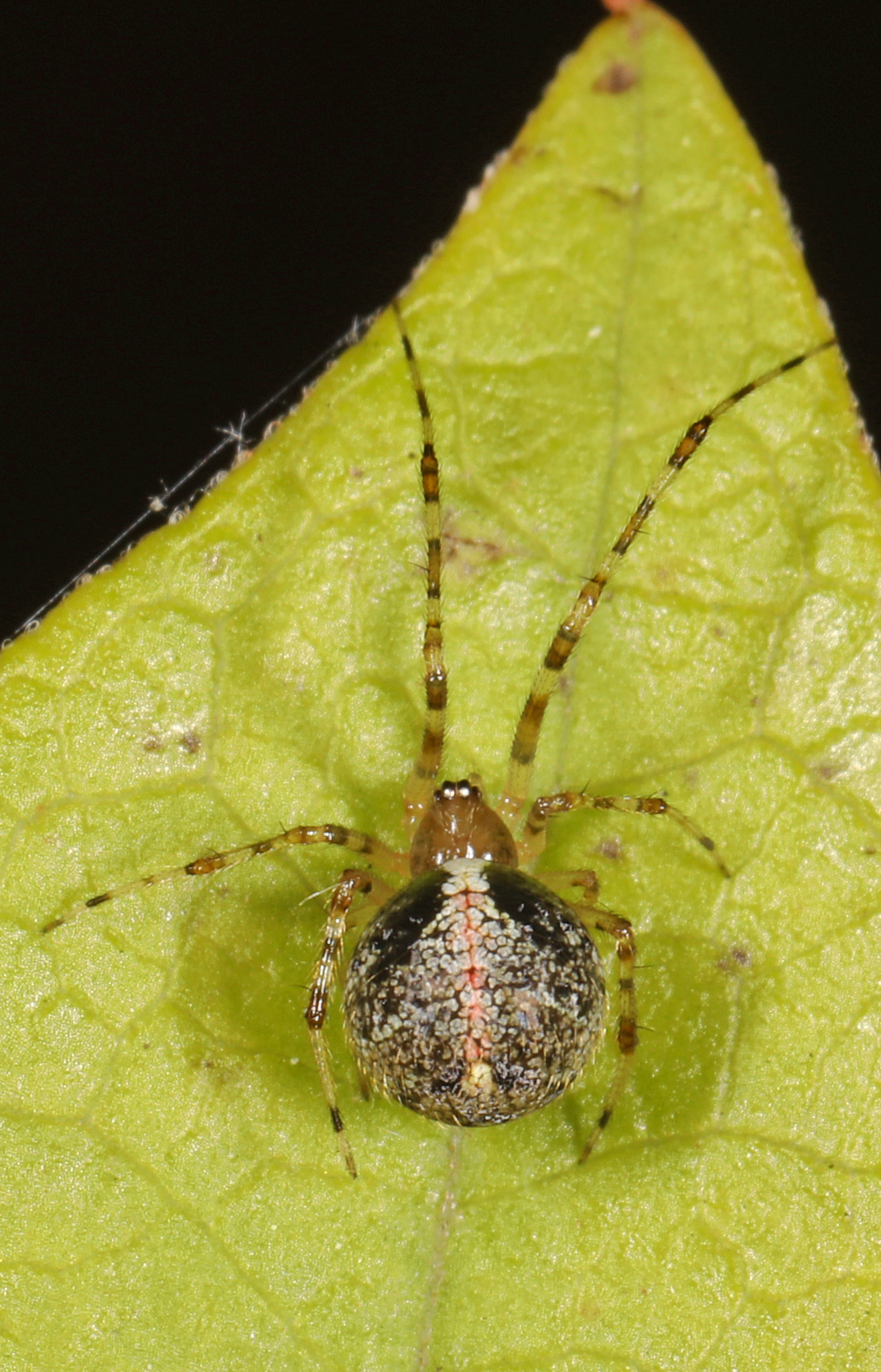
- Y. lyrica in North America

Scientific classification
- Kingdom: Animalia
- Phylum: Arthropoda
- Subphylum: Chelicerata
- Class: Arachnida
- Order: Araneae
- Infraorder: Araneomorphae
- Family: Theridiidae
- Genus: Yunohamella; Yoshida, 2007

Type species
- Y. yunohamensis (Bösenberg & Strand, 1906)

Species
- 8, see text

= Yunohamella =

Genus of spiders

Yunohamella is a genus of comb-footed spiders (family Theridiidae) that was first described by H. Yoshida in 2007.

== Distribution ==
Spiders in this genus are found in Asia, Europe, and North America.

== Species ==
As of January 2026, this genus includes thirteen species:

- Yunohamella gibbosa Gao & Li, 2014 – China
- Yunohamella gutenbergi R. Zhong, J. Liu & Hu, 2025 – China
- Yunohamella jiugongensis (Liu & Zhong, 2023) – China
- Yunohamella lyrica (Walckenaer, 1841) – China, Korea, Japan, North America
- Yunohamella mneon (Bösenberg & Strand, 1906) – Korea, Japan
- Yunohamella mohorovicici R. Zhong, J. Liu & Hu, 2025 – China
- Yunohamella palmgreni (Marusik & Tsellarius, 1986) – Finland, Poland, Estonia, Russia (Europe to W-Siberia)
- Yunohamella serpatusa (Guan & Zhu, 1993) – Russia (Urals to Far East), China, Korea
- Yunohamella subadulta (Bösenberg & Strand, 1906) – Russia (Far East), China, Korea, Japan
- Yunohamella takasukai Yoshida, 2012 – Indonesia (Java)
- Yunohamella tanzhengi Liu, 2025 – China
- Yunohamella yinningwani Liu, 2025 – China
- Yunohamella yunohamensis (Bösenberg & Strand, 1906) – Russia (Sakhalin, Kurile Islands), Korea, Japan

In synonymy:

- Y. kentuckyensis (Keyserling, 1884) = Yunohamella lyrica (Walckenaer, 1841)
- Y. tigrae (Esyunin & Efimik, 1996) = Yunohamella serpatusa (Guan & Zhu, 1993)
