= Cyrtarachne raniceps =

Scientific classification
- Kingdom: Animalia
- Phylum: Arthropoda
- Subphylum: Chelicerata
- Class: Arachnida
- Order: Araneae
- Infraorder: Araneomorphae
- Family: Araneidae
- Genus: Cyrtarachne
- Species: C. raniceps

Binomial name
- Cyrtarachne raniceps Pocock, 1900

Species of spider

Cyrtarachne raniceps is a species of spider of the genus Cyrtarachne. It is found in India and Sri Lanka. It is 9 mm long and has brown carapace with a heart shaped sternum.
