= Takayus sublatifolius =

Scientific classification
- Domain: Eukaryota
- Kingdom: Animalia
- Phylum: Arthropoda
- Subphylum: Chelicerata
- Class: Arachnida
- Order: Araneae
- Infraorder: Araneomorphae
- Family: Theridiidae
- Genus: Takayus
- Species: T. sublatifolius

Binomial name
- Takayus sublatifolius (Zhu, 1998)

Species of spider

Takayus sublatifolius is a species of comb-footed spider in the family Theridiidae. It is found in China.
