= Cyrtarachne perspicillata =

Scientific classification
- Kingdom: Animalia
- Phylum: Arthropoda
- Subphylum: Chelicerata
- Class: Arachnida
- Order: Araneae
- Infraorder: Araneomorphae
- Family: Araneidae
- Genus: Cyrtarachne
- Species: C. perspicillata

Binomial name
- Cyrtarachne perspicillata (Doleschall, 1859)

Synonyms
- Epeira perspicillata Doleschall, 1859

Species of spider

Cyrtarachne perspicillata is a species of spider of the family Araneidae. It is found in Sri Lanka, Sumatra, Java, and New Guinea. The subspecies Cyrtarachne perspicillata possoica Merian, 1911 is found in Sulawesi.
