= Yunohamella serpatusa =

Scientific classification
- Domain: Eukaryota
- Kingdom: Animalia
- Phylum: Arthropoda
- Subphylum: Chelicerata
- Class: Arachnida
- Order: Araneae
- Infraorder: Araneomorphae
- Family: Theridiidae
- Genus: Yunohamella
- Species: Y. serpatusa

Binomial name
- Yunohamella serpatusa (Guan & Zhu, 1993)

Species of spider

Yunohamella serpatusa is a species of comb-footed spider in the family Theridiidae. It is found in Russia, China, and Japan.
