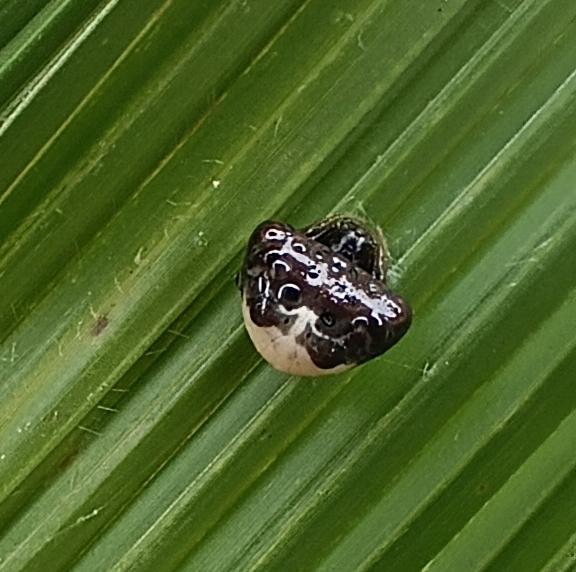

Scientific classification
- Kingdom: Animalia
- Phylum: Arthropoda
- Subphylum: Chelicerata
- Class: Arachnida
- Order: Araneae
- Infraorder: Araneomorphae
- Family: Araneidae
- Genus: Aethriscus
- Species: A. olivaceus

Binomial name
- Aethriscus olivaceus Pocock, 1902

= Aethriscus olivaceus =

Aethriscus Bird Dropping Spider

Species of spider

Aethriscus olivaceus is a species of spider in the family Araneidae, found in the Democratic Republic of the Congo and South Africa.

== Distribution ==
Aethriscus olivaceus was originally found in the Democratic Republic of the Congo and has since been recorded from South Africa, where it occurs in five provinces Eastern Cape, Gauteng, KwaZulu-Natal, Limpopo, and Mpumalanga.

== Habitat and ecology ==
The species inhabits forest, grassland, the Indian Ocean coastal belt, savanna, and thicket biomes, as well as avocado orchards. It occurs at altitudes ranging from 7 to 1,752 m above sea level.

Aethriscus olivaceus is a nocturnal orb-web dweller. When not active, individuals rest on vegetation and resemble bird droppings, which serves as camouflage.

== Conservation ==
Aethriscus olivaceus is listed as Least Concern by the South African National Biodiversity Institute due to its wide geographical range. In South Africa, it is protected in iSimangaliso Wetland Park, Dukuduku Forest Station, and St. Lucia.

== Taxonomy ==
The species was originally described by Reginald Innes Pocock in 1902 from the Democratic Republic of the Congo. It has not been revised and is known only from females. Identification remains problematic, and this species is possibly the same as Cyrtarachne ixioides.
