= Langlibaitiao =

Scientific classification
- Kingdom: Animalia
- Phylum: Arthropoda
- Subphylum: Chelicerata
- Class: Arachnida
- Order: Araneae
- Infraorder: Araneomorphae
- Family: Lathyidae
- Genus: Langlibaitiao; Lin & Li, 2024

Type species
- Lathys inaffecta Li, 2017

Species
- 4, see text

Genus of spiders

Langlibaitiao is a genus of spiders in the family Lathyidae.

== Distribution ==
Langlibaitiao has been found in China (Guizhou, Guangxi, Hainan) and Japan.

== Etymology ==
The genus is named after 張順; Zhāng shùn, one of the 108 Heroes from the classic Chinese novel Water Margin, whose nickname is 浪里白跳; Làng lǐ bái tiào. The species L. zhangshun is named after the same character.

== Species ==
As of October 2025, this genus includes four species:

- Langlibaitiao chishuiensis (Z. S. Zhang, Yang & Y. G. Zhang, 2009) – China
- Langlibaitiao inaffectus (Li, 2017) – China (type species)
- Langlibaitiao insulanus (Ono, 2003) – Japan
- Langlibaitiao zhangshun Lin & Li, 2024 – China (Hainan)
