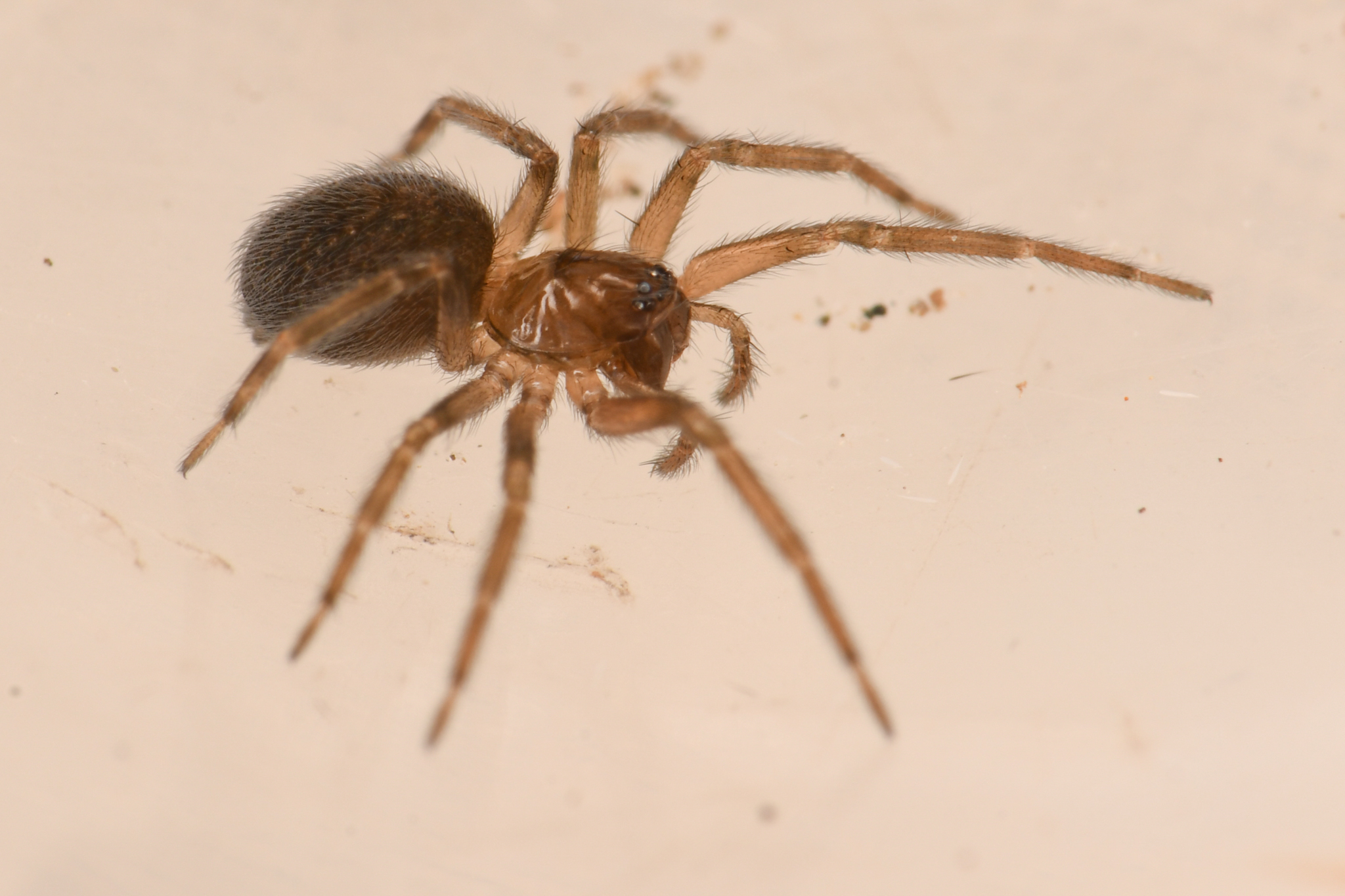
- From British Columbia

Scientific classification
- Kingdom: Animalia
- Phylum: Arthropoda
- Subphylum: Chelicerata
- Class: Arachnida
- Order: Araneae
- Infraorder: Araneomorphae
- Family: Lathyidae
- Genus: Andronova
- Species: A. alberta

Binomial name
- Andronova alberta (Gertsch, 1946)

Synonyms
- Lathys pallida Emerton, 1894; Lathys alberta Gertsch, 1946; Argenna matanuska Chamberlin & Ivie, 1947

= Andronova alberta =

Species of spider

Andronova alberta is a species of spider in the family Lathyidae. It is found across the northern regions of North America and northern Asia.

== Taxonomy ==
The species was originally described as Lathys pallida by Emerton in 1894, but this name was preoccupied by another species. In 1946, Gertsch provided the replacement name Lathys alberta. In 1947, Chamberlin and Ivie described what they believed to be a separate species, Argenna matanuska, but this was later determined to be synonymous with A. alberta.

In 2025, Katherine Montana and colleagues conducted a major phylogenetic study of the Dictynidae family and transferred the species to the newly established genus Andronova in the newly erected family Lathyidae. This taxonomic revision was based on molecular phylogenetic analysis using ultraconserved elements and morphological evidence.

== Distribution ==
A. alberta has a Holarctic distribution, being found in Russia (South Siberia to Far East), Alaska, Canada, and the United States. In North America, it has been recorded from the Rocky Mountains region, including locations in Alberta, Montana, Colorado, and Wyoming.

== Habitat ==
The species is typically found in mountainous regions, often at higher elevations where it lives under stones and among ground detritus. It has been recorded from locations ranging from 7,500 to over 12,000 feet in elevation.

== Description ==
Andronova alberta is one of the larger species in its genus. Adult females range from 2.5 to 3.6 mm in total length, averaging 3.05 mm, while a single known male specimen measured 3.2 mm long. The cephalothorax length is approximately 1.5 mm in both sexes.

The carapace varies from pale yellowish to orange-brown and is lightly shaded with dusky streaks. The opisthosoma typically displays a pattern of dusky chevrons on a grayish base color, though it can sometimes appear uniformly gray. The legs are uniformly dusky yellowish brown.

The eyes form a transverse group nearly two and one-half times as wide as long, with the posterior row moderately procurved. The anterior median eyes of females are quite large, being half the diameter of the anterior lateral eyes, while in males these eyes are nearly two-thirds the diameter of the laterals. The female chelicerae are armed with two large teeth and two small denticles on the upper margin, and four teeth on the lower margin.
