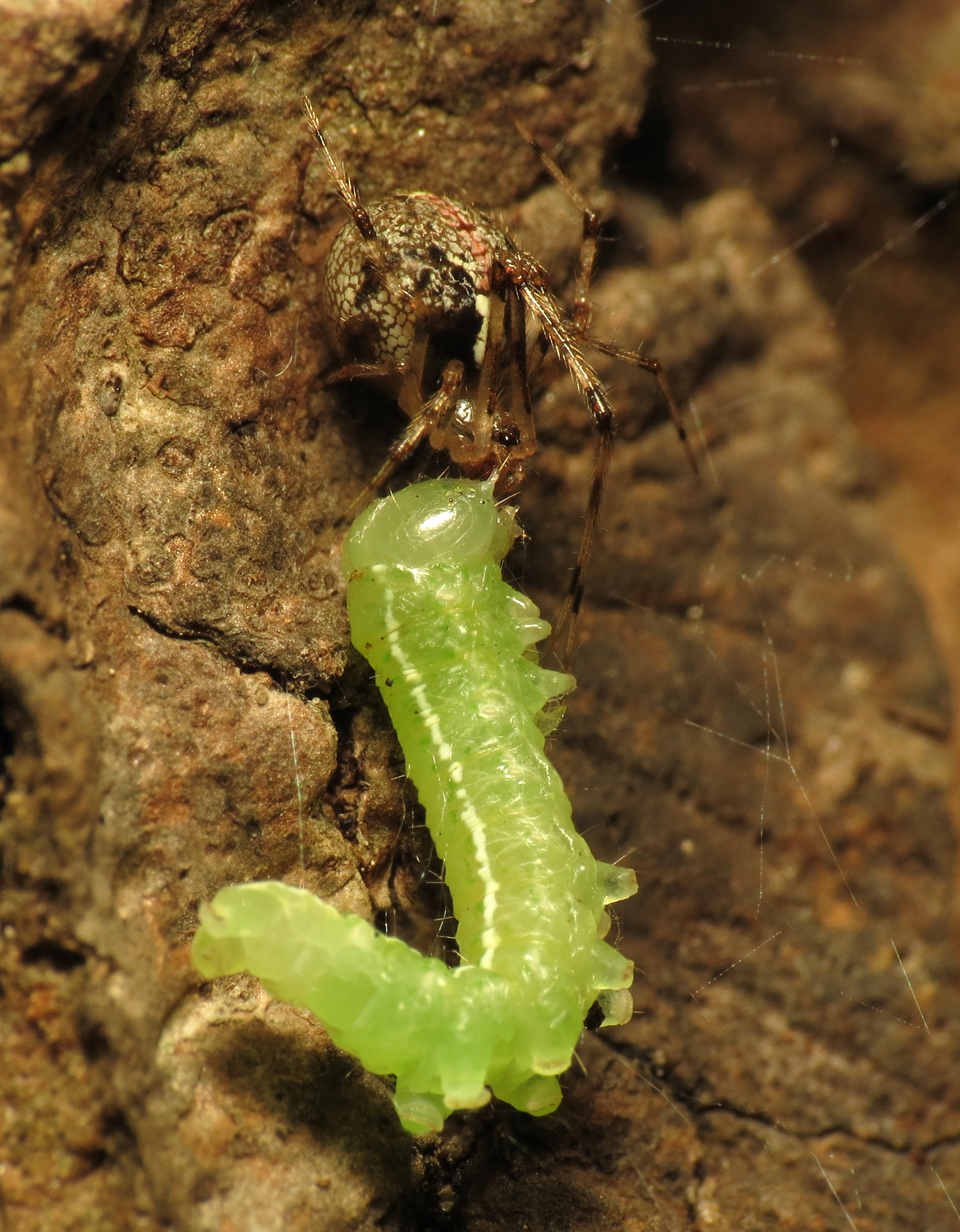
- With a caterpillar it had caught.

Scientific classification
- Domain: Eukaryota
- Kingdom: Animalia
- Phylum: Arthropoda
- Subphylum: Chelicerata
- Class: Arachnida
- Order: Araneae
- Infraorder: Araneomorphae
- Family: Theridiidae
- Genus: Yunohamella
- Species: Y. lyrica

Binomial name
- Yunohamella lyrica (Walckenaer, 1841)

= Yunohamella lyrica =

Species of spider

Yunohamella lyrica is a species of cobweb spider in the family Theridiidae. It is found in North America, Korea, and Japan.
