= Draposa =

Scientific classification
- Kingdom: Animalia
- Phylum: Arthropoda
- Subphylum: Chelicerata
- Class: Arachnida
- Order: Araneae
- Infraorder: Araneomorphae
- Family: Lycosidae
- Genus: Draposa; Kronestedt, 2010

Type species
- Draposa nicobarica (Thorell, 1891)

Species
- See text

Diversity
- 10 species

Genus of spiders

Draposa is a genus of wolf spiders in the family Lycosidae, containing ten species. The species were formerly included in genus Pardosa, but later included in the new genus Draposa.

== Species ==
- Draposa amkhasensis (Tikader & Malhotra, 1976) — India
- Draposa atropalpis (Gravely, 1924) — India, Sri Lanka
- Draposa burasantiensis (Tikader & Malhotra, 1976) — India, China
- Draposa lyrivulva (Bösenberg & Strand, 1906) — Pakistan, India, Sri Lanka
- Draposa nicobarica (Thorell, 1891) — Nicobar Islands
- Draposa oakleyi Gravely, 1924 — Pakistan, India, Bangladesh
- Draposa porpaensis (Gajbe, 2004) — India
- Draposa subhadrae (Patel & Reddy, 1993) — India, Sri Lanka
- Draposa tenasserimensis (Thorell, 1895) — Myanmar, possibly Sumatra, Java
- Draposa zhanjiangensis (Yin et al., 1995) — China, possibly Malaysia, Sumatra, Borneo
