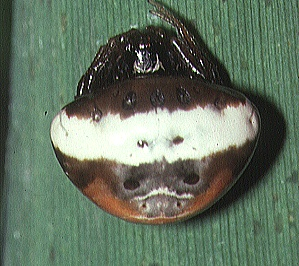

Scientific classification
- Kingdom: Animalia
- Phylum: Arthropoda
- Subphylum: Chelicerata
- Class: Arachnida
- Order: Araneae
- Infraorder: Araneomorphae
- Family: Araneidae
- Genus: Cyrtarachne
- Species: C. nagasakiensis

Binomial name
- Cyrtarachne nagasakiensis Strand, 1918

= Cyrtarachne nagasakiensis =

Species of spider

Cyrtarachne nagasakiensis is a species of spider in the orb-weaver spider family Araneidae, found in Pakistan, India, China, Korea and Japan. Spiders in the genus Cyrtarachne construct "spanning-thread webs" rather than the more typical orb webs of the family Araneidae. These webs have a small number of radii and instead of a tight spiral of sticky threads, the sticky spanning threads are widely spaced and do not form a spiral. When prey is caught on one of the spanning threads, one end comes loose, and the prey, often a moth, dangles from the other end until hauled in by the spider.

== Description ==
The female has a body length of 5–7 mm. The carapace is wider than long, and is reddish brown with dark brown markings. The sternum is also reddish brown. The abdomen is broad, wider than long, and marked with a broad white band running from side to side, with a gold edge at the rear. The epigyne has no scape. The male is smaller, with a body length of 1–5 mm. It is darker than the female and lacks the white band on the abdomen. The median apophysis of the palpal bulb is thick and has a pointed tip.

== Taxonomy ==
Cyrtarachne nagasakiensis was first described by Embrik Strand in 1918. Strand included drawings, but said that nothing was known other than that it was collected in Nagasaki. The genus Cyrtarachne was included in molecular phylogenetic studies in 2014 and 2020 which placed it in the "cyrtarachnines" in the subfamily Cyrtarachninae s.l.
