= Yunohamella palmgreni =

Scientific classification
- Kingdom: Animalia
- Phylum: Arthropoda
- Subphylum: Chelicerata
- Class: Arachnida
- Order: Araneae
- Infraorder: Araneomorphae
- Family: Theridiidae
- Genus: Yunohamella
- Species: Y. palmgreni

Binomial name
- Yunohamella palmgreni (Marusik & Tsellarius, 1986)

Species of spider

Yunohamella palmgreni is a species of comb-footed spider in the family Theridiidae. It is found in Poland, Finland, Estonia, and Russia as far east as Siberia. Yunohamella palmegreni has also been observed in Sweden in recent years.
