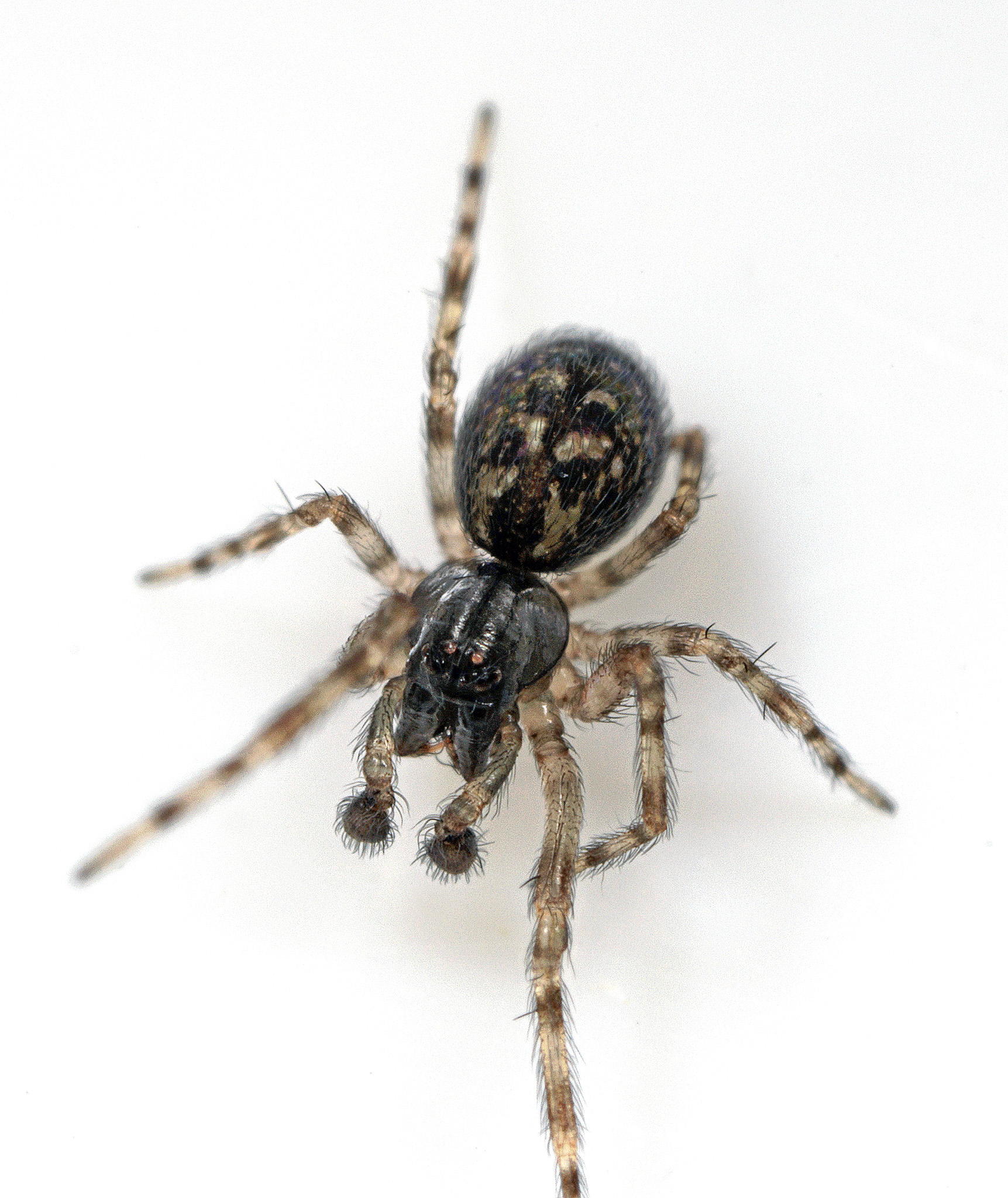
- Lathys humilis
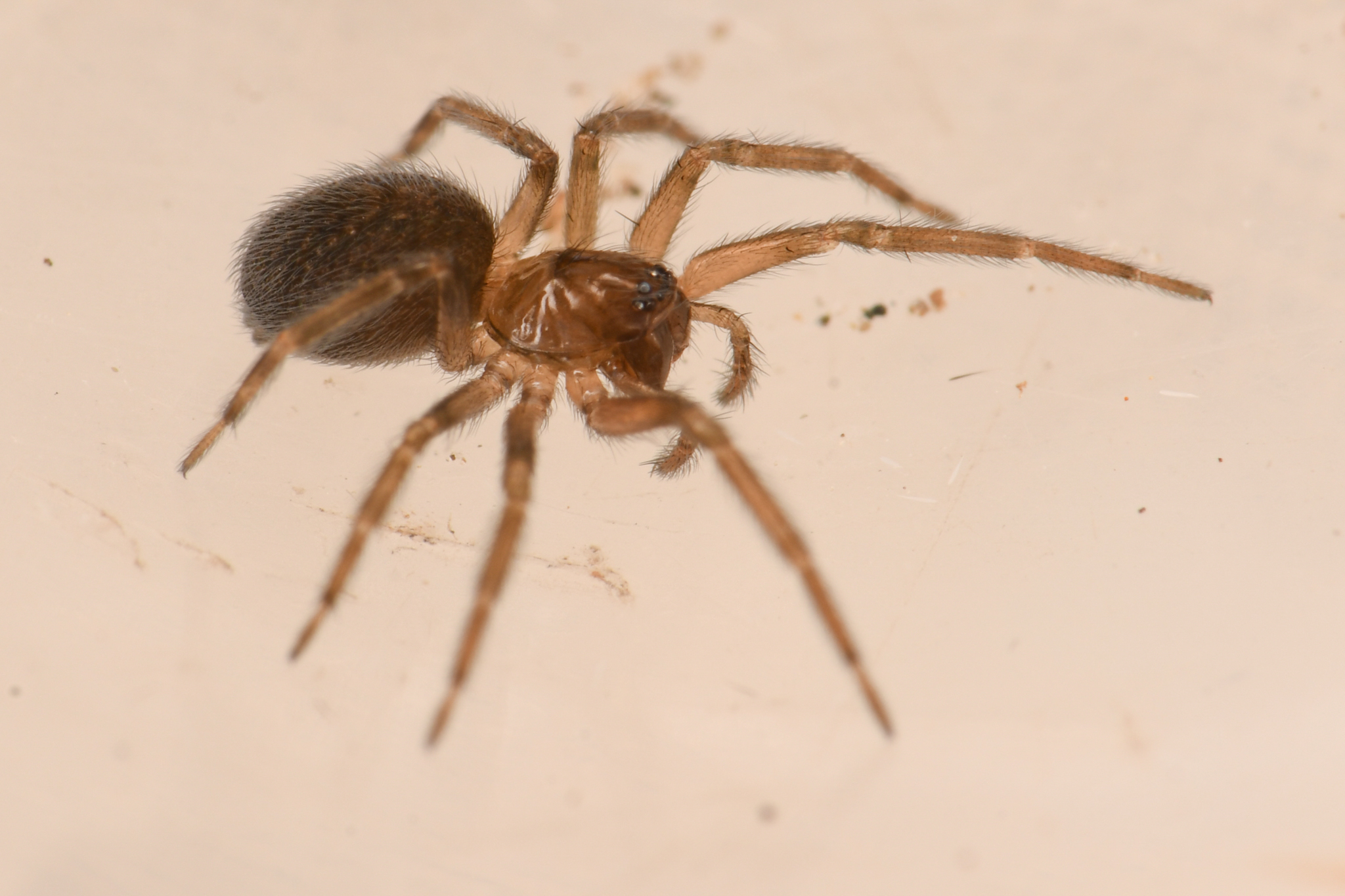
- Andronova alberta

Scientific classification
- Kingdom: Animalia
- Phylum: Arthropoda
- Subphylum: Chelicerata
- Class: Arachnida
- Order: Araneae
- Infraorder: Araneomorphae
- Family: Lathyidae; Cala-Riquelme, Montana, Crews & Esposito, 2025

Type genus
- Lathys Simon, 1885

Genera
- See text

Diversity
- 10 genera, 58 species
- blue: reported countries (WSC) green: observation hotspots (iNaturalist)

= Lathyidae =

Family of spiders

Lathyidae is a family of spiders established in 2025, comprising small cribellate araneomorph spiders. The family was erected following a comprehensive molecular phylogenetic study that resolved the taxonomic confusion within the "tailor's drawer" family Dictynidae sensu lato.

== Taxonomy ==
The family Lathyidae was established by Cala-Riquelme, Montana, Crews & Esposito in 2025 as part of a major revision of Dictynidae sensu lato. The family name is based on the type genus Lathys, which was originally described by Eugène Simon in 1885 as a replacement name for Lethia Menge, 1869, which was preoccupied by a genus of moths.

Previous molecular phylogenetic studies had consistently shown that various genera classified within Dictynidae were evolutionarily distant from the core dictynid lineage, leading to the recognition of several distinct families within the superfamily Dictynoidea. The subfamily Lathysinae proposed by Gorneau et al. (2023) was unavailable under Article 16 of the International Code of Zoological Nomenclature.

== Description ==
Lathyidae are small, cribellate spiders with a low to moderately high carapace and narrow clypeus. The anterior median eyes (AME) are usually narrower than the other eyes or may be absent entirely. The anterior lateral eyes (ALE), posterior median eyes (PME), and posterior lateral eyes (PLE) are subequal in size and sub-equidistantly spaced.

The chelicerae are rather short and moderately stout, lacking basal enlargements or spurs. Males possess distinctive pedipalps where the conductor upper arm is usually longer than the lower arm, and the conductor lower arm is typically directed dorsally. A unique locking mechanism comprises a longitudinal furrow, retrolateral tibial apophysis (RTA), and hook-shaped tibial process.

The embolus is coiled more than 150 degrees but not more than 1200 degrees. In females, the epigyne has primary spermathecae that are two or more times wider than the copulatory duct width, with well-developed copulatory ducts that are usually many times longer than the primary spermathecae width.

== Distribution ==
Lathyidae have a global distribution, with species recorded from multiple continents including Europe, Asia, Africa, and North America.

== Genera ==
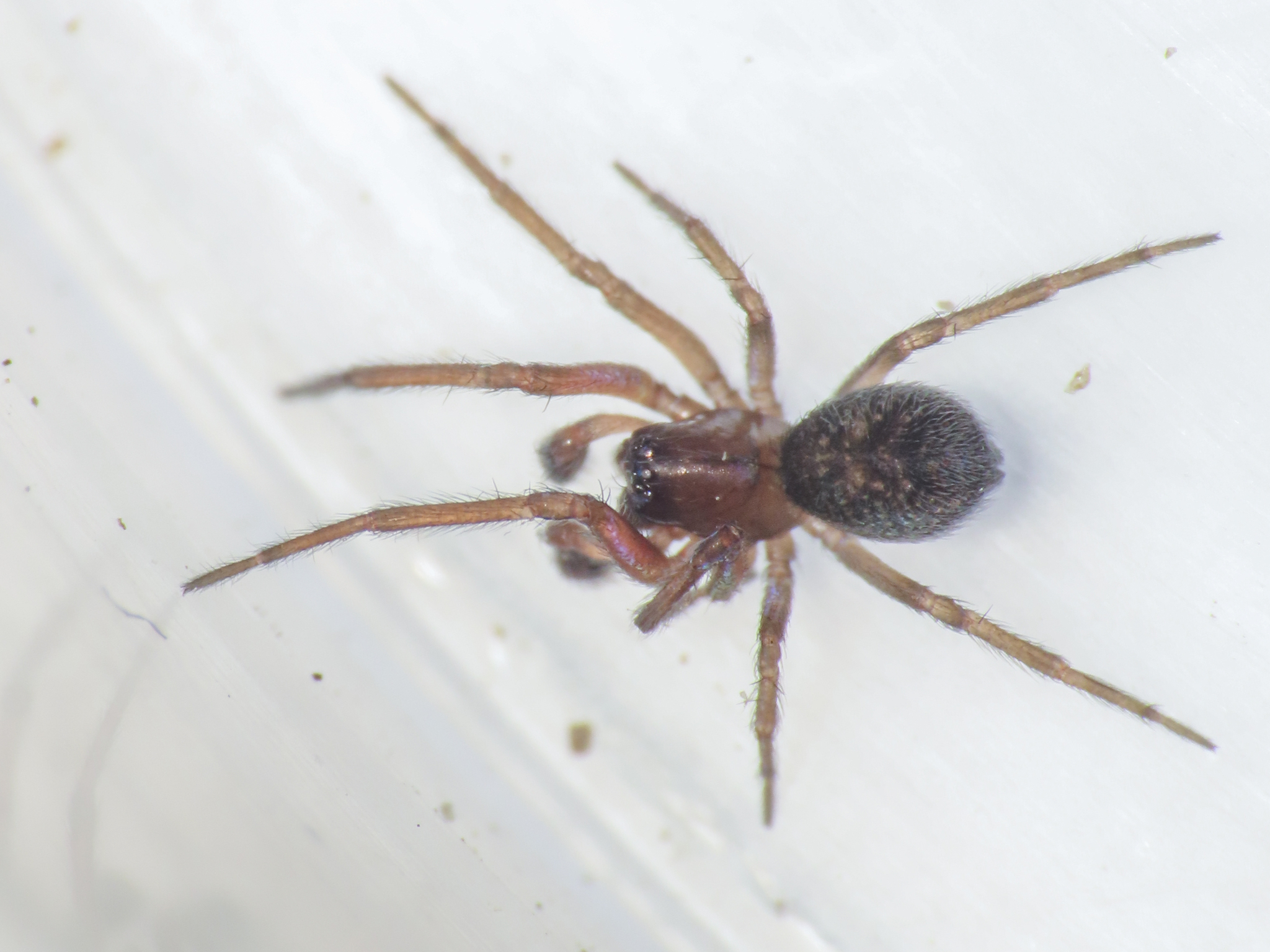
Tolokonniella stigmatisata

As of October 2025, this family includes ten genera and 58 species:

- Afrolathys Cala-Riquelme, Al-Jamal & Esposito, 2025 – Madagascar, Tanzania
- Analtella Denis, 1947 – Europe
- Andronova Cala-Riquelme, Montana & Esposito, 2025 – Algeria, Tunisia, Asia, Bulgaria, Ukraine, Russia, Cyprus, Greece, Italy, North America
- Asialathys Cala-Riquelme & Crews, 2025 – China
- Bannaella Zhang & Li, 2011 – China, Japan, Korea
- Denticulathys Cala-Riquelme, Al-Jamal & Crews, 2025 – Gabon, Central African Rep
- Langlibaitiao Lin & Li, 2024 – China, Japan
- Lathys Simon, 1885 – Algeria, Morocco, China, Pakistan, Caucasus, Iran, Turkey, Russia, Portugal, Spain, France, North America, North Africa. Introduced to Canada
- Scotolathys Simon, 1885 – Algeria, Israel, Europe, North America
- Tolokonniella Cala-Riquelme, Crews & Esposito, 2025 – Algeria, Kazakhstan, Turkey, Russia, Spain
