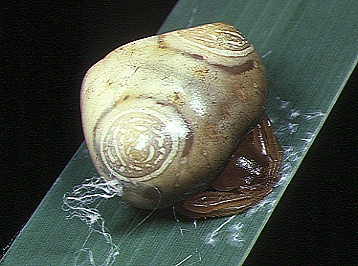

Scientific classification
- Kingdom: Animalia
- Phylum: Arthropoda
- Subphylum: Chelicerata
- Class: Arachnida
- Order: Araneae
- Infraorder: Araneomorphae
- Family: Araneidae
- Genus: Cyrtarachne
- Species: C. inaequalis

Binomial name
- Cyrtarachne inaequalis Thorell, 1895

= Cyrtarachne inaequalis =

Species of spider

Cyrtarachne inaequalis is a species of spider in the orb-weaver spider family Araneidae, found in India, Myanmar, China and Korea. Spiders in the genus Cyrtarachne construct "spanning-thread webs" rather than the more typical orb webs of the family Araneidae. These webs have a small number of radii and instead of a tight spiral of sticky threads, the sticky spanning threads are widely spaced and do not form a spiral. When prey is caught on one of the spanning threads, one end comes loose, and the prey, often a moth, dangles from the other end until hauled in by the spider.

== Description ==
The body of the female is 8–13 mm long. The carapace is brownish with a darker head region. The sternum is pale yellow. The abdomen narrows towards the posterior, and is wider than long. The upper surface of the abdomen is yellowish with two raised "shoulders" which have brownish or grayish rings. The lower surface is yellow with a dark brown median spot. The legs are yellow. The scape is triangular with thickened edges and a scoop-shaped tip. The male spider is much smaller with a body length of about 2–2.5 mm. The upper surface of the body is generally darker than that of the female except for the back part of the abdomen which is yellowish brown. The sternum is lighter brown and the underside of the abdomen is yellow with dark brown stripes. The median apophysis of the palpal bulb is thick and has a pointed tip.

== Taxonomy ==
Cyrtarachne inaequalis was first described by Tamerlan Thorell in 1895. The genus Cyrtarachne was included in molecular phylogenetic studies in 2014 and 2020 which placed it in the "cyrtarachnines" in the subfamily Cyrtarachninae s.l.

Spiders found in Japan that had previously been identified as C. inaequalis were found to belong to two new species, C. akirai and C. jucunda.
