= Yaginumena maculosa =

Scientific classification
- Kingdom: Animalia
- Phylum: Arthropoda
- Subphylum: Chelicerata
- Class: Arachnida
- Order: Araneae
- Infraorder: Araneomorphae
- Family: Theridiidae
- Genus: Yaginumena
- Species: Y. maculosa

Binomial name
- Yaginumena maculosa (Yoshida & Ono, 2000)

Species of spider

Yaginumena maculosa is a species of comb-footed spider in the family Theridiidae. It is found in China, Japan, and Korea, the Caucasus, and the Middle East.
