= Yaginumena castrata =

Scientific classification
- Kingdom: Animalia
- Phylum: Arthropoda
- Subphylum: Chelicerata
- Class: Arachnida
- Order: Araneae
- Infraorder: Araneomorphae
- Family: Theridiidae
- Genus: Yaginumena
- Species: Y. castrata

Binomial name
- Yaginumena castrata (Bösenberg & Strand, 1906)

Species of spider

Yaginumena castrata is a species of comb-footed spider in the family Theridiidae. It is found in the far east of Russia, China, Japan, and Korea.
