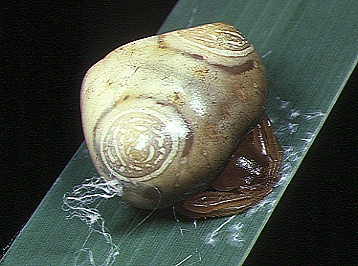
- female Cyrtarachne inaequalis from Okinawa.

Scientific classification
- Kingdom: Animalia
- Phylum: Arthropoda
- Subphylum: Chelicerata
- Class: Arachnida
- Order: Araneae
- Infraorder: Araneomorphae
- Family: Araneidae
- Subfamily: Cyrtarachninae s.l.
- Genus: Cyrtarachne; Thorell, 1868

Type species
- C. grubei (Keyserling, 1864)

Species
- 56, see text

= Cyrtarachne =

Genus of spiders

Cyrtarachne is a genus of orb-weaver spiders first described by Tamerlan Thorell in 1868.

== Life style ==
Cyrtarachne construct “spanning thread-webs”, a basic orb-web, but the web diameter, sticky spiral spacing and viscid thread diameter differ from that of typical orb-webs.

The viscid threads are studded with large droplets. Each of the short threads between the radii is known as a spanning thread, and is unique in that it breaks when prey comes into contact with it. The prey flies into the web, gets stuck to a viscid thread, the thread breaks, and the spider pulls the prey up to the hub of the web to feed. During the day the spider rests on close-by vegetation mimicking bird-droppings.

== Description ==
Females are 5–8 mm in total length, while males are 2–3 mm. The female carapace is brown and shiny, convex and simple. The ocular quadrangle is slightly wider than long, with lateral eyes contiguous. The abdomen is large and triangular, wider than long, decorated with horizontal bands of white and brown centrally, with paired sigilla. The dorsum is shiny, appearing hard and shell-like. The legs are short with leathery integument and coloured bands and patches. Males differ from females and are much smaller.

== Species ==
As of November 2026, this genus includes 54 species and two subspecies:

- Cyrtarachne akirai Tanikawa, 2013 – China, Korea, Taiwan, Japan
- Cyrtarachne avimerdaria Tikader, 1963 – India
- Cyrtarachne bengalensis Tikader, 1961 – India, China
- Cyrtarachne bicolor Thorell, 1898 – Myanmar
- Cyrtarachne bigibbosa Simon, 1907 – São Tomé and Príncipe, Equatorial Guinea (Bioko)
- Cyrtarachne bilunulata Thorell, 1899 – Cameroon
- Cyrtarachne biswajiti Biswas & Raychaudhuri, 2020 – Bangladesh
- Cyrtarachne biswamoyi Tikader, 1961 – India
- Cyrtarachne bufo (Bösenberg & Strand, 1906) – China, Korea, Japan
- Cyrtarachne cingulata Thorell, 1895 – Myanmar
- Cyrtarachne conica O. Pickard-Cambridge, 1901 – Singapore
- Cyrtarachne dimidiata Thorell, 1895 – Myanmar
- Cyrtarachne fangchengensis Yin & Zhao, 1994 – China
- Cyrtarachne finniganae Lessert, 1936 – Mozambique
- Cyrtarachne flavopicta Thorell, 1899 – Cameroon, Equatorial Guinea
- Cyrtarachne friederici Strand, 1911 – New Guinea
- Cyrtarachne gibbifera Simon, 1899 – Indonesia (Sumatra)
- Cyrtarachne gilva Yin & Zhao, 1994 – China
- Cyrtarachne grubei (Keyserling, 1864) – Mauritius (type species)
- Cyrtarachne guttigera Simon, 1909 – Vietnam
- Cyrtarachne heminaria Simon, 1909 – Vietnam
- Cyrtarachne histrionica Thorell, 1898 – Myanmar
- Cyrtarachne hubeiensis Yin & Zhao, 1994 – China
- Cyrtarachne ignava Thorell, 1895 – Myanmar
- Cyrtarachne inaequalis Thorell, 1895 – India, China, Korea, Myanmar
- Cyrtarachne invenusta Thorell, 1891 – India (Nicobar Is.)
- Cyrtarachne ixoides (Simon, 1870) – Mediterranean, Caucasus, South Africa, Madagascar
- Cyrtarachne jucunda Tanikawa, 2013 – Japan
- Cyrtarachne kaikobadi Biswas & Raychaudhuri, 2025 – Bangladesh
- Cyrtarachne lactea Pocock, 1898 – East Africa
- Cyrtarachne laevis Thorell, 1877 – Indonesia (Sumatra, Flores, Sulawesi)
- Cyrtarachne latifrons Hogg, 1900 – Australia (Victoria)
  - C. l. atuberculata Hogg, 1900 – Australia (Victoria)
- Cyrtarachne lepida Thorell, 1890 – Indonesia (Sumatra)
- Cyrtarachne madagascariensis Emerit, 2000 – Madagascar
- Cyrtarachne melanoleuca Ono, 1995 – Thailand
- Cyrtarachne melanosticta Thorell, 1895 – Myanmar
- Cyrtarachne menghaiensis Yin, Peng & Wang, 1994 – China
- Cyrtarachne nagasakiensis Strand, 1918 – Pakistan, India, China, Korea, Japan
- Cyrtarachne nodosa Thorell, 1899 – Cameroon, Equatorial Guinea (Bioko), Yemen
- Cyrtarachne pallida O. Pickard-Cambridge, 1885 – Pakistan, India
- Cyrtarachne perspicillata (Doleschall, 1859) – Sri Lanka, Indonesia (Sumatra, Java), New Guinea
  - C. p. possoica Merian, 1911 – Indonesia (Sulawesi)
- Cyrtarachne promilai Tikader, 1963 – India
- Cyrtarachne raniceps Pocock, 1900 – India, Sri Lanka
- Cyrtarachne rubicunda L. Koch, 1871 – Australia (New South Wales)
- Cyrtarachne schmidi Tikader, 1963 – India, China
- Cyrtarachne sundari Tikader, 1963 – India, Bangladesh
- Cyrtarachne sunjoymongai Ahmed, Sumukha, Khalap, Mohan & Jadhav, 2015 – India
- Cyrtarachne szetschuanensis Schenkel, 1963 – China
- Cyrtarachne termitophila Lawrence, 1952 – DR Congo
- Cyrtarachne tricolor (Doleschall, 1859) – Indonesia, (Moluccas)
- Cyrtarachne tuladepilachna Barrion & Litsinger, 1995 – Philippines
- Cyrtarachne wayanadensis Jwala, Sen & Sureshan, 2022 – India
- Cyrtarachne xanthopyga Kulczyński, 1911 – New Guinea
- Cyrtarachne yunoharuensis Strand, 1918 – China, Korea, Japan
