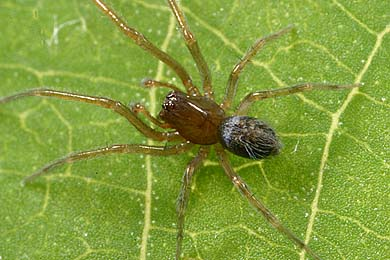
- L. insulana, male

Scientific classification
- Kingdom: Animalia
- Phylum: Arthropoda
- Subphylum: Chelicerata
- Class: Arachnida
- Order: Araneae
- Infraorder: Araneomorphae
- Family: Dictynidae
- Genus: Lathys; Simon, 1884

Type species
- L. humilis (Blackwall, 1855)

Species
- 15, see text

Synonyms
- Analtella Denis, 1947; Auximus Simon, 1892

= Lathys =

Genus of spiders

Lathys is a genus of cribellate araneomorph spiders in the family Dictynidae, and was first described by Eugène Simon in 1884. It is a replacement name for "Lethia" Menge, 1869 because that name was already in use as a synonym for a genus of moths.

== Species ==
As of January 2026, this genus includes fifteen species and one subspecies:

- Lathys adunca Liu, 2018 – China
- Lathys albida Gertsch, 1946 – United States
- Lathys bin Marusik & Logunov, 1991 – Russia (Kurile Islands)
- Lathys borealis Z. S. Zhang, Hu & Y. G. Zhang, 2012 – China
- Lathys brevitibialis Denis, 1956 – Morocco
- Lathys coralynae Gertsch & Davis, 1942 – Mexico
- Lathys dixiana Ivie & Barrows, 1935 – United States
- Lathys foxi (Marx, 1891) – Canada, United States
- Lathys heterophthalma Kulczyński, 1891 – Europe, Russia (Europe to West Siberia)
- Lathys humilis (Blackwall, 1855) – Europe, Algeria, Turkey, Caucasus, Iran, Central Asia. Introduced to Canada
  - L. h. meridionalis (Simon, 1874) – Spain, France (incl. Corsica), North Africa
- Lathys mantarota Wunderlich, 2022 – Portugal
- Lathys sexpustulata (Simon, 1878) – Spain, France, Morocco
- Lathys simplicior (Dalmas, 1916) – Algeria
- Lathys sindi (Caporiacco, 1934) – Pakistan (Karakorum)
- Lathys subhumilis Z. S. Zhang, Hu & Y. G. Zhang, 2012 – China
