= Friedrich Wilhelm Bösenberg =

- Born: 1841
- Died: February 2, 1903; Stuttgart, Germany
- Known for: Collector of spiders from Baden-Württemberg
- Scientific career
- Fields: Arachnology

Friedrich Wilhelm Bösenberg (1841 – 2 February 1903) was a German merchant and arachnologist, noted as a collector of spiders from Baden-Württemberg.

He worked professionally as a wholesale merchant of gold and silver jewelry in Pforzheim. In his free time, he devoted himself to the collection and study of spiders, acquiring enough expertise to publish numerous papers in specialized journals.

His collaboration with the Norwegian arachnologist Embrik Strand led to the description of about one hundred new taxa, mostly spider species, from both Germany and Japan.

== Taxa described (selection) ==
- Alenatea fuscocolorata (Bösenberg & Strand, 1906), Araneidae
- Allocosa hirsuta (Bösenberg & Lenz, 1895), Lycosidae
- Cyclosa argenteoalba (Bösenberg & Strand, 1906), Araneidae
- Euophrys valens (Bösenberg & Lenz, 1895), Salticidae
- Gnaphosa kompirensis (Bösenberg & Strand, 1906), Gnaphosidae
- Hyptiotes affinis (Bösenberg & Strand, 1906), Uloboridae
- Tmeticus bipunctis (Bösenberg & Strand, 1906), Linyphiidae
- Yaginumena castrata (Bösenberg & Strand, 1906), Theridiidae

== Taxa named in his honor ==
- Araneus boesenbergi (Fox, 1938), Araneidae
- Argiope boesenbergi (Levi, 1983), Araneidae
- Ariadna boesenbergi (Keyserling, 1877), Segestriidae
- Theridion boesenbergi (Strand, 1904), Theridiidae
- Thomisus boesenbergi (Lenz, 1891), Thomisidae
- Xysticus boesenbergi (Charitonov, 1928), Thomisidae

== Selected works ==
- Bösenberg, F.W. & Lenz, H. (1894). Ostafrikanische Spinnen gesammelt von Herrn Dr. F. Stuhlmann in den Jahren 1888 und 1889. Jahrbuch der Hamburgischen Wissenschaftlichen Anstalte, XII, Gräfe & Sillem, Hamburg.
- Bösenberg, F.W. (1895). Beitrag zur Kenntnis der Arachniden-Fauna von Madeira und den Canarischen Inseln. Abhandlungen aus dem Gebiete der Naturwissenschaft, Naturwissenschaftlicher Verein in Hamburg, Friederichsen & Co., Hamburg.
- Bösenberg, W. (1899). Die Spinnen der Rheinprovinz. Verhandlungen des naturhistorischen Vereins der preußischen Rheinlande und Westfalens 56: 69–131.
- Bösenberg, F.W. (1901–1903). Die Spinnen Deutschlands. Zoologica, Stuttgart, 6 volumes.
- Bösenberg, F.W. & Strand, E. (1906). Japanische Spinnen. Abhandlungen der Senckenbergischen Naturforschenden Gesellschaft, Band 256.
