= Bird dropping spider =

Bird dropping spider is a common name for several spiders and may refer to:

- Arkys curtulus
- Celaenia excavata, a species native to eastern Australia
- Mastophora, a genus native to the New World
