= A. cornutus =

A. cornutus may refer to:

- Aenictus cornutus, an ant species in the genus Aenictus
- Allococalodes cornutus, a jumping spider species
- Amphicerus cornutus, a beetle species
- Arkys cornutus, an orb-weaver spider species in the genus Arkys

== See also ==
- Cornutus (disambiguation)
