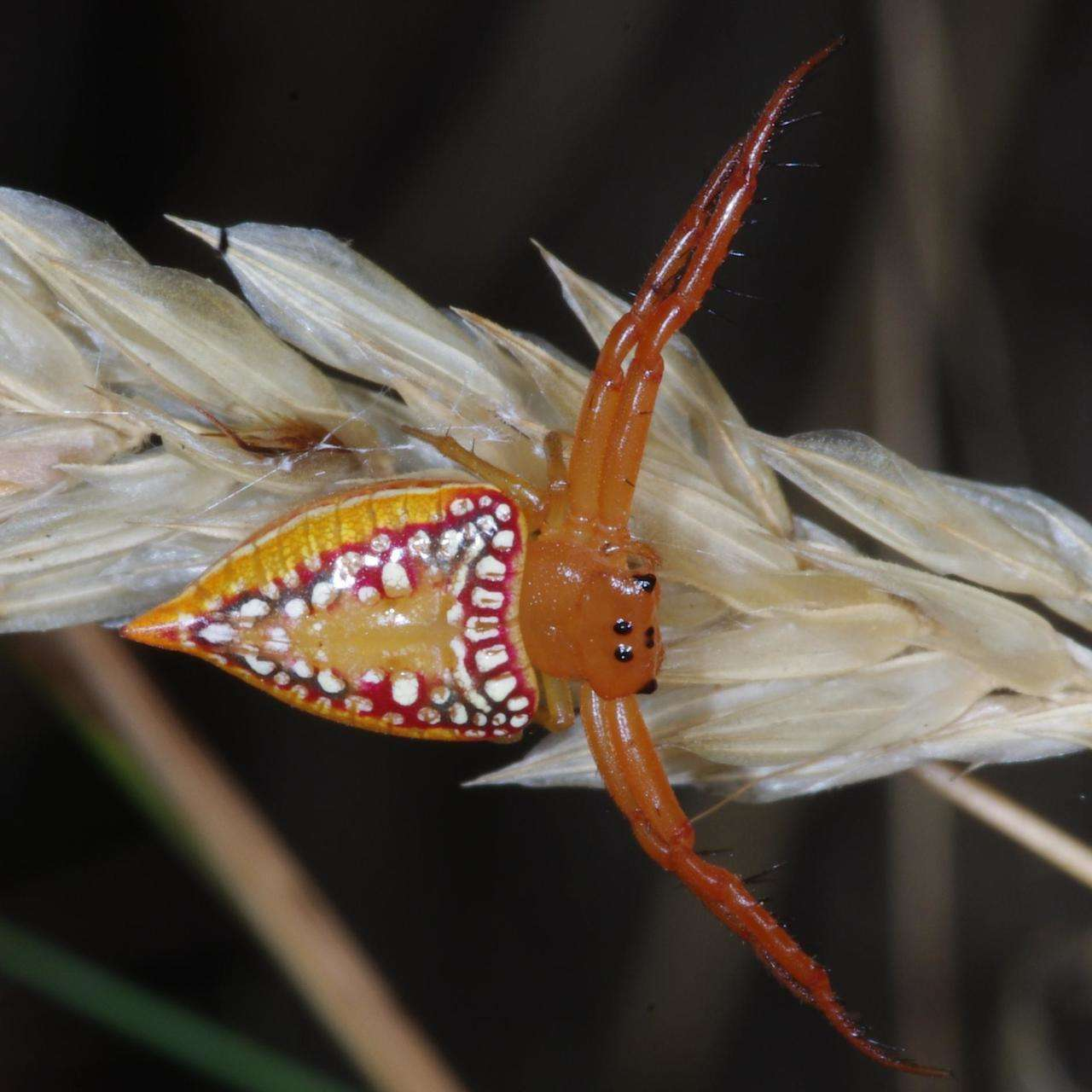

Scientific classification
- Kingdom: Animalia
- Phylum: Arthropoda
- Subphylum: Chelicerata
- Class: Arachnida
- Order: Araneae
- Infraorder: Araneomorphae
- Family: Arkyidae
- Genus: Arkys
- Species: A. walckenaeri

Binomial name
- Arkys walckenaeri Simon, 1879

Synonyms
- Arkys clavatus Keyserling, 1890; Arkys nitidiceps Simon, 1908

= Arkys walckenaeri =

triangular spider

Species of spider

Arkys walckenaeri, Walckenaer's studded arkys, is a common Australian spider belonging to the family Arkyidae. A small ambush hunter with long curved forelegs and a narrow, triangular shaped abdomen, it is named in honour of Charles Athanase Walckenaer. It also occurs on Java.

== Description ==
Arkys walckenaeri's triangular abdomen shows regional variability in colour and pattern. Specimens from Queensland and Java have white sigilla on an orange to red abdomen. West Australian, South Australian and Tasmanian specimens, on the other hand, are pale yellow with few to no visible markings. Both sexes reach a length of approximately 7 mm.
