= Celaenia hectori =

Conservation status
- Data Deficient (NZ TCS)

Scientific classification
- Kingdom: Animalia
- Phylum: Arthropoda
- Subphylum: Chelicerata
- Class: Arachnida
- Order: Araneae
- Infraorder: Araneomorphae
- Family: Araneidae
- Genus: Celaenia
- Species: C. hectori

Binomial name
- Celaenia hectori (Pickard-Cambridge, 1880)

Synonyms
- Thlaosoma hectori

Species of Arachnida

Celaenia hectori is a species of Araneidae spider that is native to New Zealand.

== Taxonomy ==
This species was described as Thlaosoma hectori in 1880 by Octavius Pickard-Cambridge from a single female specimen collected in Dunedin. It was transferred to Celaenia in 1917.

== Description ==
This species has an olive yellowish cephalothorax and legs. The abdomen is dull yellowish with dark yellow brown shading. This species is similar to Celaenia atkinsoni, but is smaller.

== Distribution ==
This species is only known from Dunedin, New Zealand.

== Conservation status ==
Under the New Zealand Threat Classification System, this species is listed as "Data Deficient" with the qualifiers of "Data Poor: Size" and "Data Poor: Trend".
