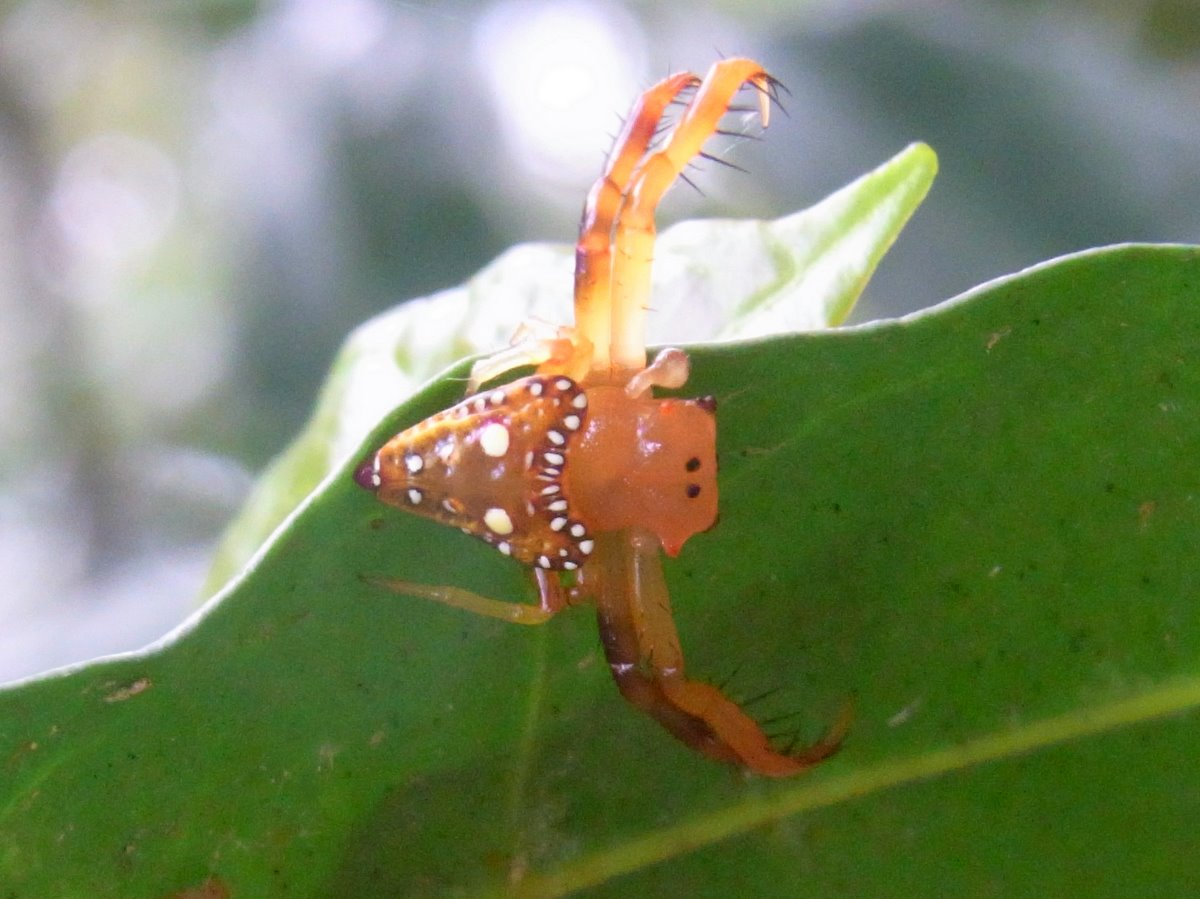
- At Ku-ring-gai Chase National Park, Australia

Scientific classification
- Domain: Eukaryota
- Kingdom: Animalia
- Phylum: Arthropoda
- Subphylum: Chelicerata
- Class: Arachnida
- Order: Araneae
- Infraorder: Araneomorphae
- Family: Arkyidae
- Genus: Arkys
- Species: A. lancearius

Binomial name
- Arkys lancearius Walckenaer, 1837

= Arkys lancearius =

Species of spider

Arkys lancearius, the triangular spider, is a common Australian spider belonging to the family Arkyidae. It is an ambush hunter, commonly found resting on leaves and ferns or hanging from just a few threads of silk. The front two pairs of legs are large, suited for grabbing small insects, while the rear pairs of legs are much smaller.

== Description and habit ==
The body length of males is about 5.5 millimetres (0.22 in), while that of females are around 8 millimetres (0.31 in). Body colour varies from yellow or orange to red with pale jewel-like markings on the heart shaped abdomen. Egg sacs are produced in January or February and are a deep pinkish cream colour. They are usually around 8 mm in diameter and are covered in lighter coloured threads. Each sac contains about 70 eggs, each 0.7 mm in diameter.
