= Arkys enigma =

Scientific classification
- Kingdom: Animalia
- Phylum: Arthropoda
- Subphylum: Chelicerata
- Class: Arachnida
- Order: Araneae
- Infraorder: Araneomorphae
- Family: Arkyidae
- Genus: Arkys
- Species: A. enigma

Binomial name
- Arkys enigma Douglas, 2018

Species of spider

Holotype site: Douglas River, TAS'"`UNIQ--ref-00000006-QINU`"'

Arkys enigma is a small turreted spider found in Tasmania, which was first described in 2018 by John Douglas.
