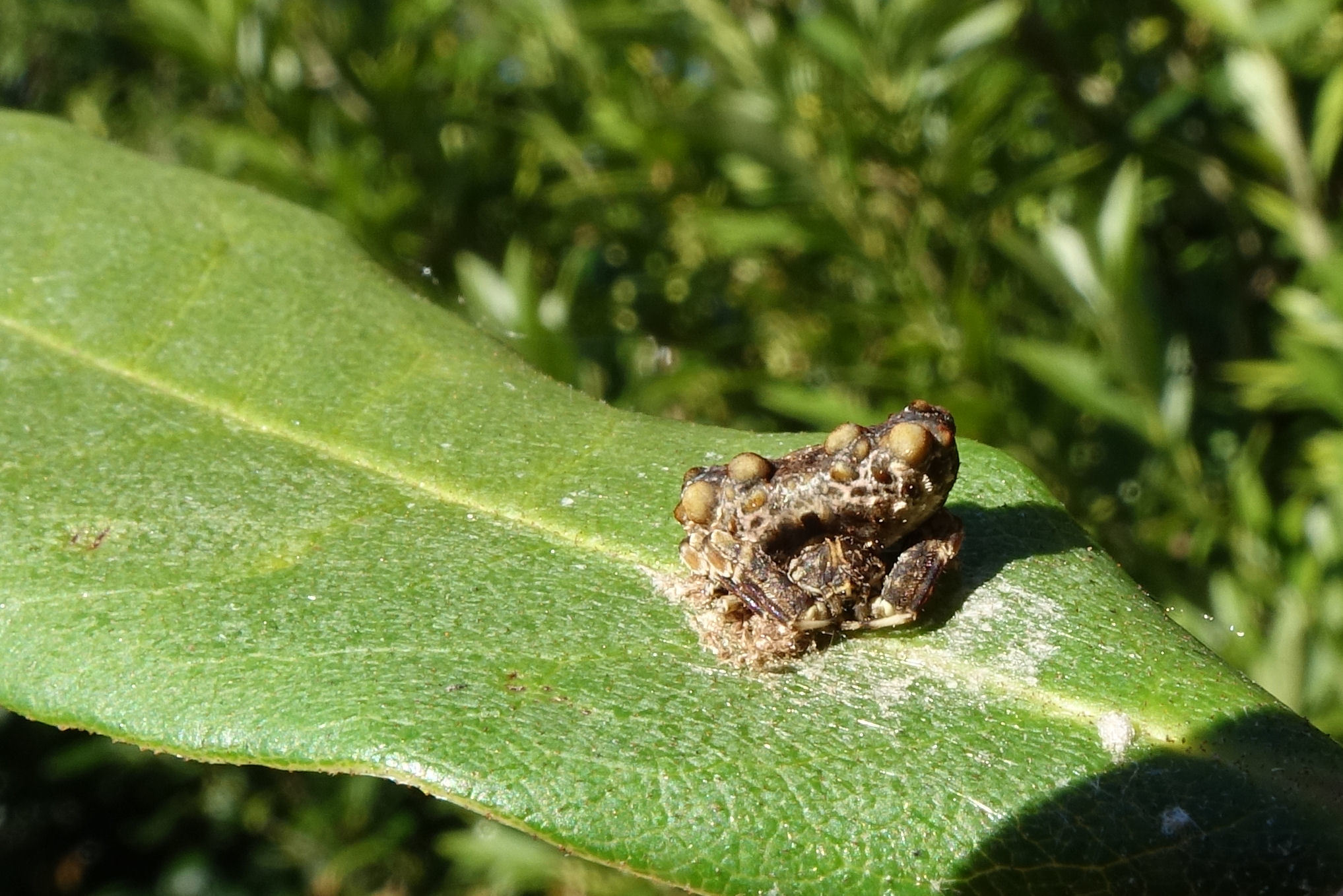

Conservation status
- Data Deficient (NZ TCS)

Scientific classification
- Domain: Eukaryota
- Kingdom: Animalia
- Phylum: Arthropoda
- Subphylum: Chelicerata
- Class: Arachnida
- Order: Araneae
- Infraorder: Araneomorphae
- Family: Araneidae
- Genus: Celaenia
- Species: C. tuberosa

Binomial name
- Celaenia tuberosa (Urquhart, 1889)

Synonyms
- Thlaosoma tuberosa

= Celaenia tuberosa =

Species of Arachnida

Celaenia tuberosa is a species of Araneidae spider that is endemic to New Zealand.

== Taxonomy ==
This species was described as Thlaosoma tuberosa in 1889 by Arthur Urquhart from a female specimen collected in Te Karaka. It was transferred to the Celaenia genus in 1917.

== Description ==
The female is recorded at 5.1 mm (0.20 in) in length.

== Distribution ==
This species is only known from Te Karaka, New Zealand.

== Conservation status ==
Under the New Zealand Threat Classification System, this species is listed as "Data Deficient" with the qualifiers of "Data Poor: Size" and "Data Poor: Trend".
