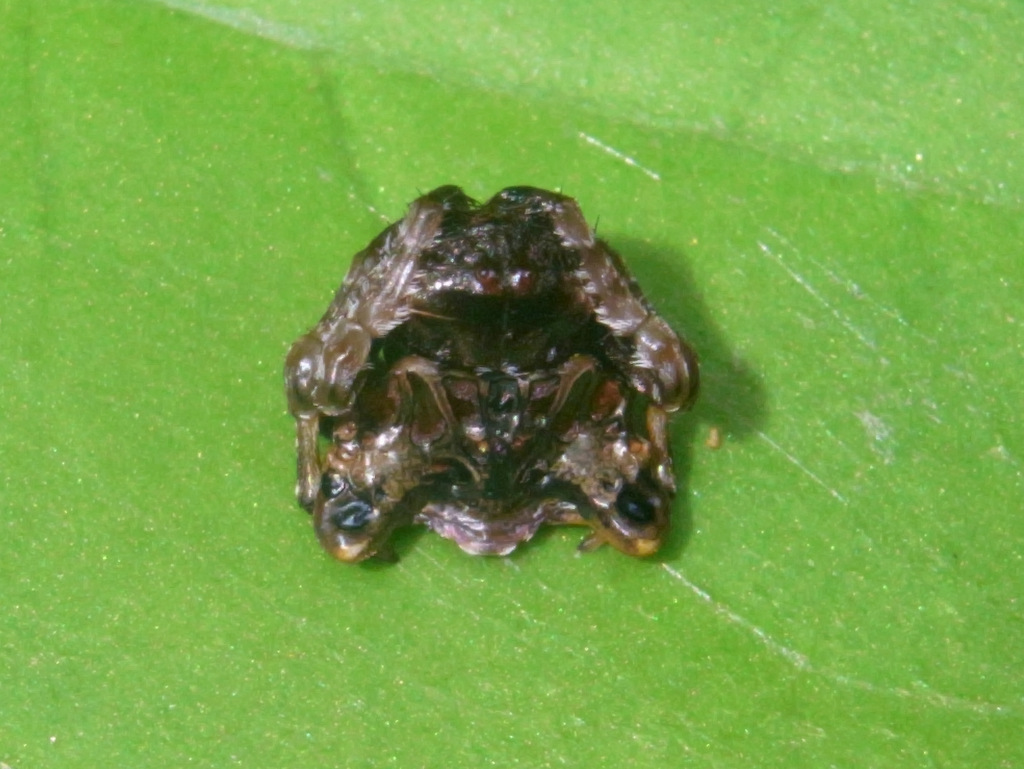
- Spider in a garden at Chatswood West, Australia

Scientific classification
- Domain: Eukaryota
- Kingdom: Animalia
- Phylum: Arthropoda
- Subphylum: Chelicerata
- Class: Arachnida
- Order: Araneae
- Infraorder: Araneomorphae
- Family: Arkyidae
- Genus: Arkys
- Species: A. curtulus

Binomial name
- Arkys curtulus (Simon, 1903)

Synonyms
- Archemorus curtulus Simon, 1903

= Arkys curtulus =

Small bird dropping spider

Species of spider

Arkys curtulus, the small bird dropping spider, is a small spider found in eastern Australia. It is usually seen resting on leaves waiting for prey to come near, commonly feasting on soldier flies. Colours and patterns vary considerably, ranging from cream, orange, mottled, brown or black.
