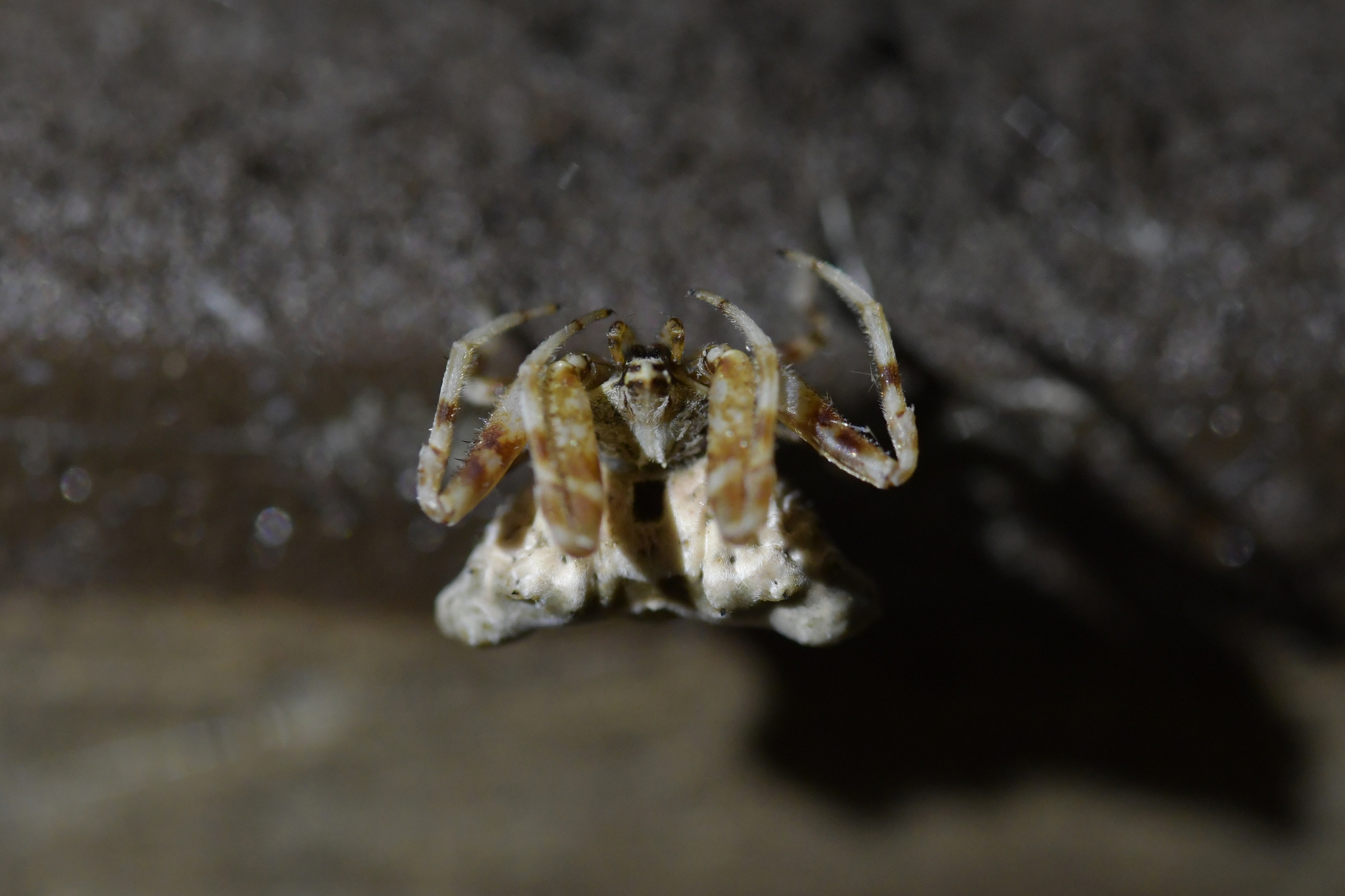

Conservation status
- Data Deficient (NZ TCS)

Scientific classification
- Domain: Eukaryota
- Kingdom: Animalia
- Phylum: Arthropoda
- Subphylum: Chelicerata
- Class: Arachnida
- Order: Araneae
- Infraorder: Araneomorphae
- Family: Araneidae
- Genus: Celaenia
- Species: C. olivacea

Binomial name
- Celaenia olivacea (Urquhart, 1885)

Synonyms
- Thlaosoma olivacea

= Celaenia olivacea =

Species of Arachnida

Celaenia olivacea is a species of Araneidae spider that is native to New Zealand.

== Taxonomy ==
This species was described as Thlaosoma olivacea in 1885 by Arthur Urquhart from a female specimen collected in Auckland. The male was described in 1887. It was transferred to the Celaenia genus in 1917.

== Description ==
The female is record at 5mm in length whereas the male is 1.8mm.

== Distribution ==
This species is only known from the North Island of New Zealand.

== Conservation status ==
Under the New Zealand Threat Classification System, this species is listed as "Data Deficient" with the qualifiers of "Data Poor: Size" and "Data Poor: Trend".
