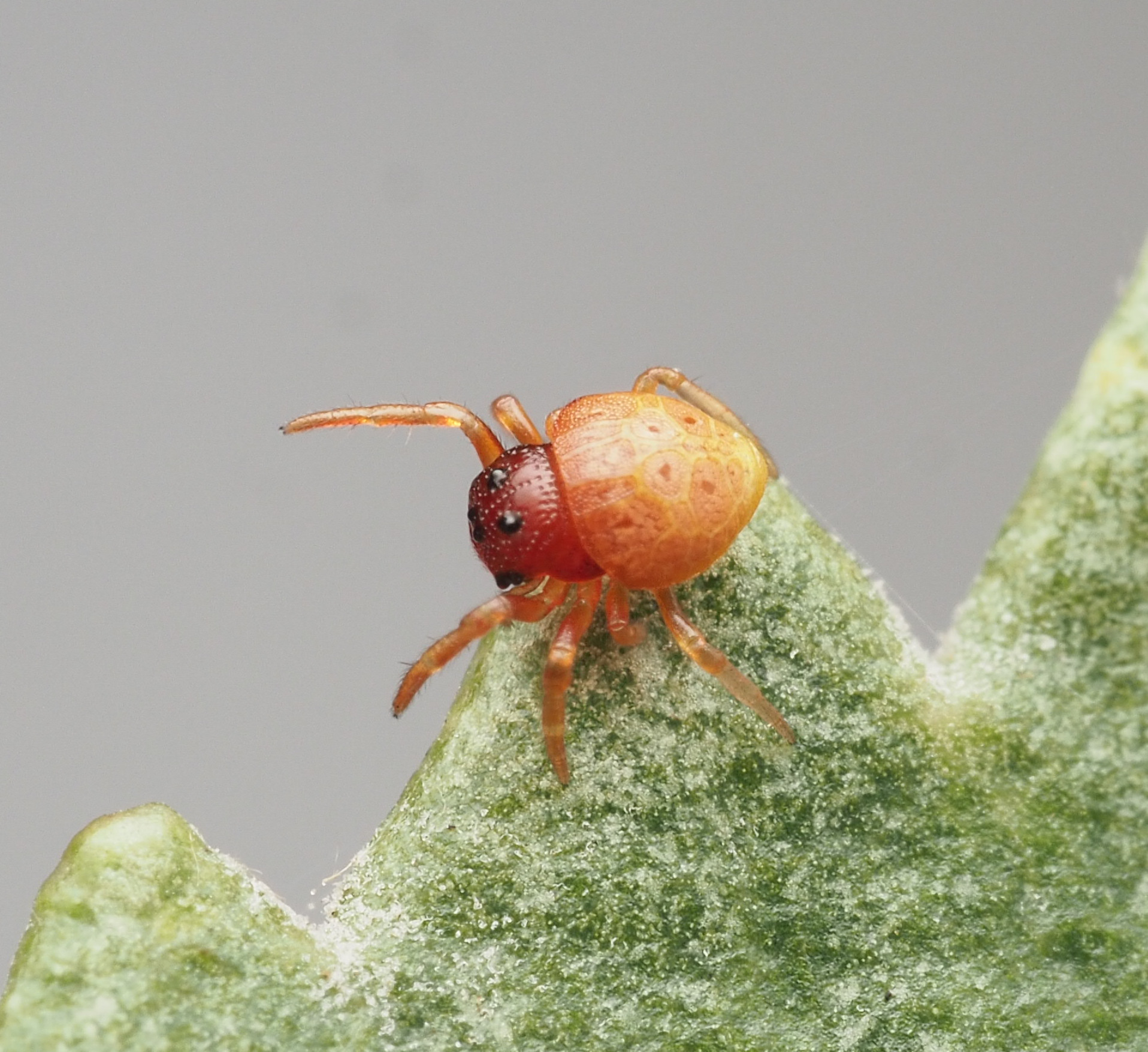
- Demadiana complicata in Great Sandy National Park, Queensland
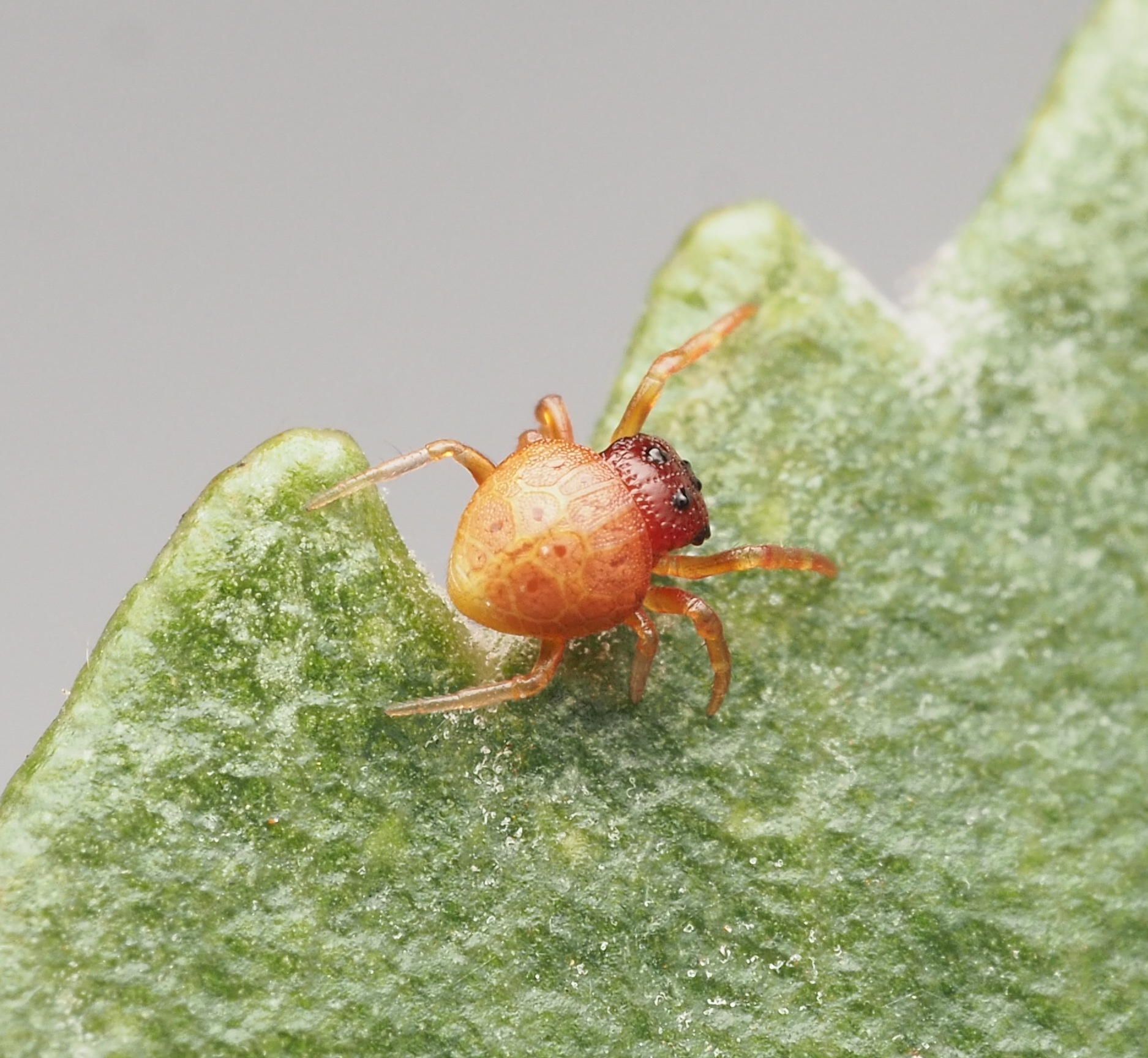

Scientific classification
- Kingdom: Animalia
- Phylum: Arthropoda
- Subphylum: Chelicerata
- Class: Arachnida
- Order: Araneae
- Infraorder: Araneomorphae
- Family: Arkyidae
- Genus: Demadiana; Strand, 1929

Type species
- Dema simplex (Karsch, 1878)

Species
- 6, see text

Synonyms
- Dema Karsch, 1878

= Demadiana =

Genus of spiders

Demadiana is a genus of Australian araneomorph spiders in the family Arkyidae, first described by Embrik Strand in 1929.

== Species ==
As of October 2025, this genus includes six species:

- Demadiana carrai Framenau, Scharff & Harvey, 2010 – Australia (New South Wales)
- Demadiana cerula (Simon, 1908) – Australia (Western Australia)
- Demadiana complicata Framenau, Scharff & Harvey, 2010 – Australia (Queensland)
- Demadiana diabolus Framenau, Scharff & Harvey, 2010 – Australia (South Australia, Tasmania)
- Demadiana milledgei Framenau, Scharff & Harvey, 2010 – Australia (New South Wales, Victoria)
- Demadiana simplex (Karsch, 1878) – Australia (Western Australia, South Australia, New South Wales, Victoria) (type species)
