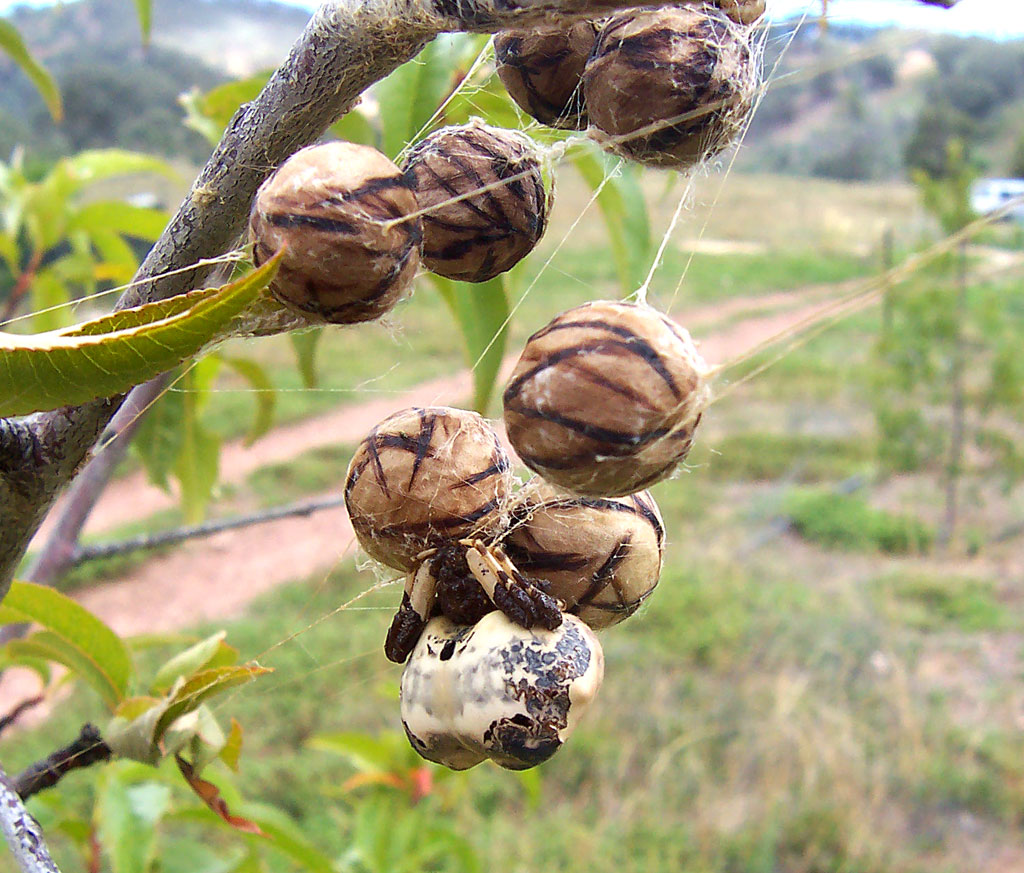
- possibly C. excavata

Scientific classification
- Kingdom: Animalia
- Phylum: Arthropoda
- Subphylum: Chelicerata
- Class: Arachnida
- Order: Araneae
- Infraorder: Araneomorphae
- Family: Araneidae
- Subfamily: Cyrtarachninae s.l.
- Genus: Celaenia; Thorell, 1868

Type species
- C. excavata (L. Koch, 1867)

Species
- 11, see text

= Celaenia =

Genus of spiders

Celaenia is a genus of South Pacific orb-weaver spiders first described by Tamerlan Thorell in 1868.

== Species ==
As of November 2026 it contains eleven species:

- Celaenia atkinsoni (O. Pickard-Cambridge, 1880) – Australia, Tasmania, New Zealand
- Celaenia calotoides Rainbow, 1908 – Australia (New South Wales)
- Celaenia distincta (O. Pickard-Cambridge, 1869) – Australia (New South Wales, Tasmania)
- Celaenia dubia (O. Pickard-Cambridge, 1869) – Australia (New South Wales, Victoria)
- Celaenia excavata (L. Koch, 1867) – Australia, New Zealand
- Celaenia hectori (O. Pickard-Cambridge, 1880) – New Zealand
- Celaenia olivacea (Urquhart, 1885) – New Zealand
- Celaenia penna (Urquhart, 1887) – New Zealand
- Celaenia tuberosa (Urquhart, 1889) – New Zealand
- Celaenia tumidosa Urquhart, 1891 – Australia (Tasmania)
- Celaenia voraginosa Urquhart, 1891 – Australia (Tasmania)
