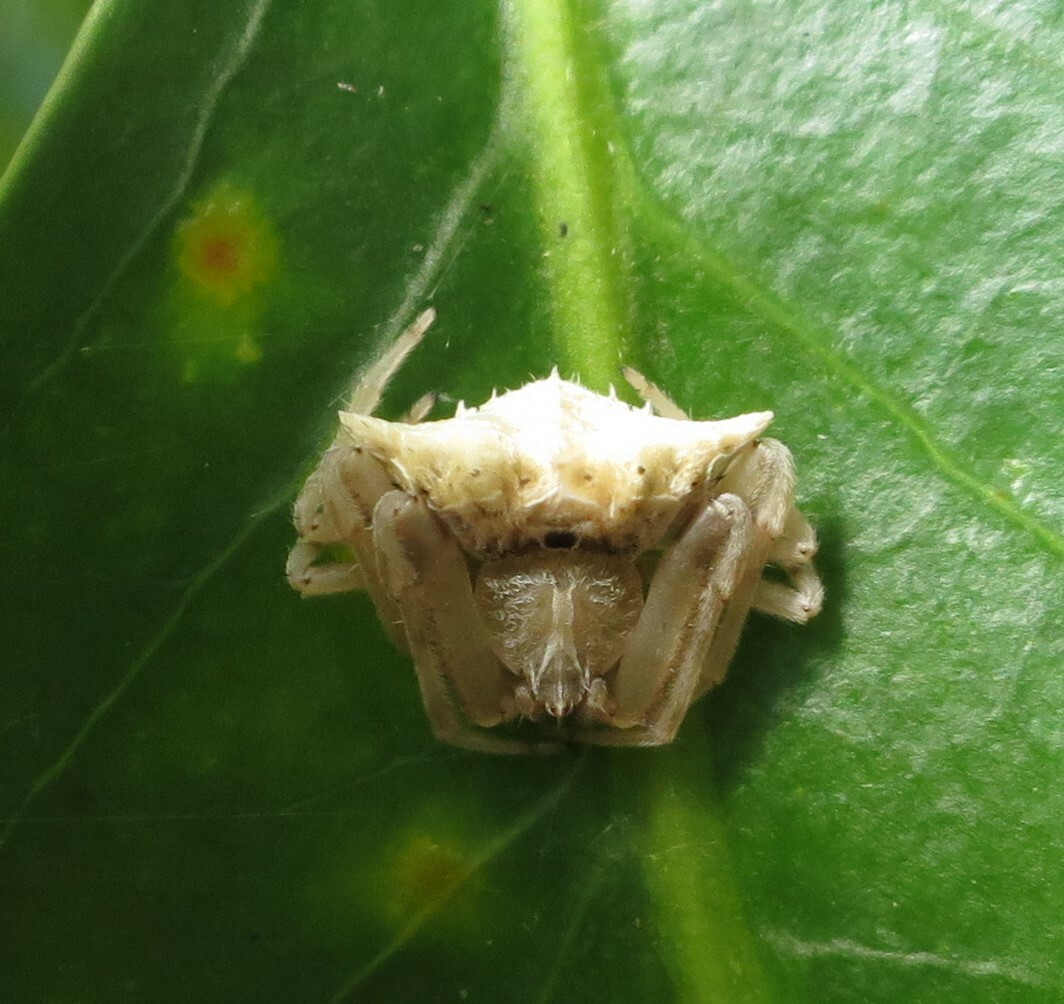

Conservation status
- Data Deficient (NZ TCS)

Scientific classification
- Domain: Eukaryota
- Kingdom: Animalia
- Phylum: Arthropoda
- Subphylum: Chelicerata
- Class: Arachnida
- Order: Araneae
- Infraorder: Araneomorphae
- Family: Araneidae
- Genus: Celaenia
- Species: C. penna

Binomial name
- Celaenia penna (Urquhart, 1887)

Synonyms
- Thlaosoma pennum

= Celaenia penna =

Species of Arachnida

Celaenia penna is a species of Araneidae spider that is native to New Zealand.

== Taxonomy ==
This species was described as Thlaosoma pennum in 1887 by Arthur Urquhart from a single specimen collected in Waiwera. It was transferred to the Celaenia genus in 1917.

== Description ==
This species is recorded at 5.5 mm (0.22 in) in length. The cephalothorax is creamy white with brownish streaks. The legs are also creamy white. The abdomen is creamy white with brown shading anteriorly.

== Distribution ==
The species is endemic to New Zealand. In addition to the type locality of Waiwera, the species has been identified in other locations across both the North Island and South Island of New Zealand.

== Behaviour ==
Like other members of Celaenia, the species specialises in capturing male moths, which it attracts at night time.

== Conservation status ==
Under the New Zealand Threat Classification System, this species is listed as "Data Deficient" with the qualifiers of "Data Poor: Size" and "Data Poor: Trend".
