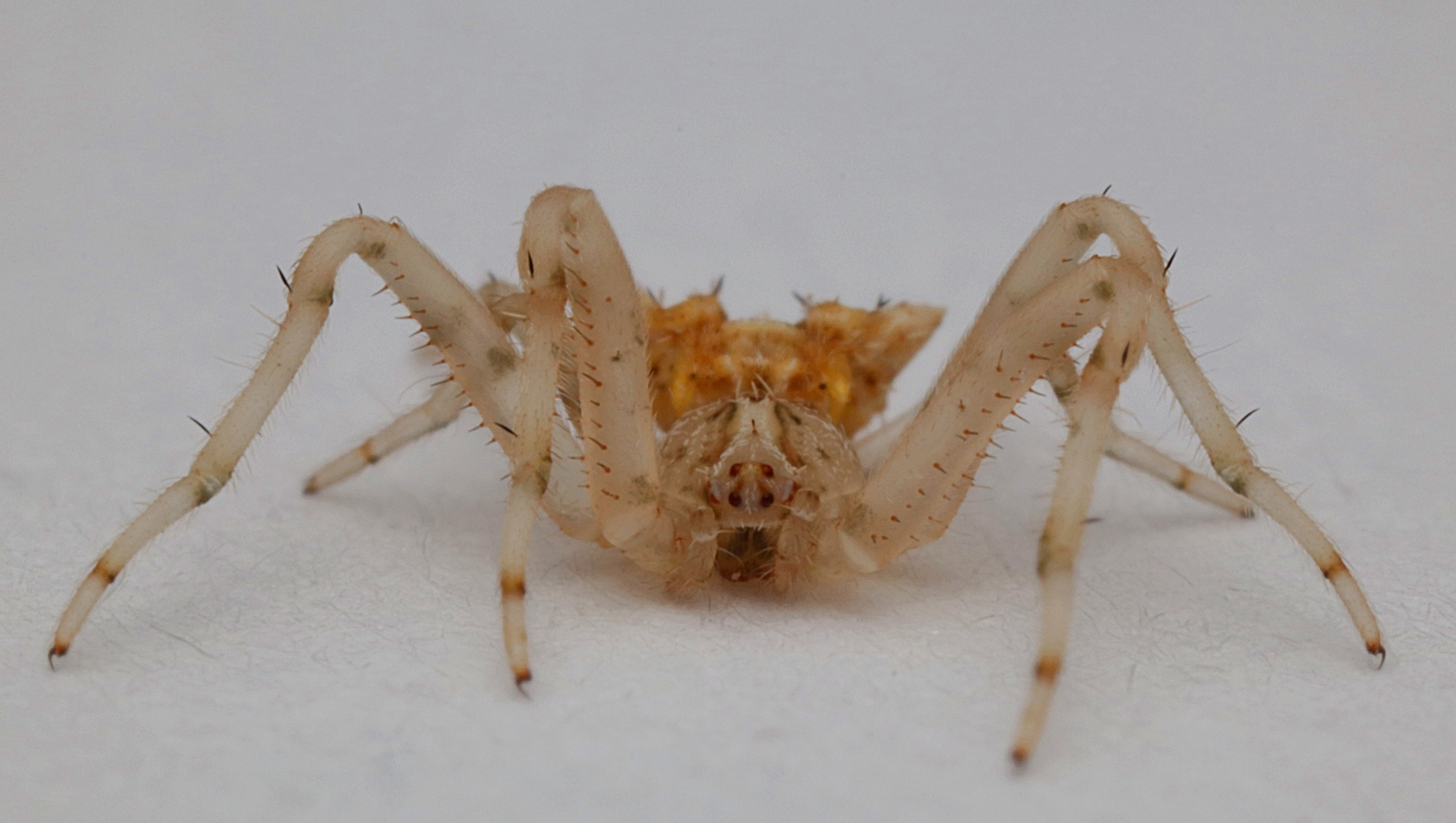

Conservation status
- Not Threatened (NZ TCS)

Scientific classification
- Kingdom: Animalia
- Phylum: Arthropoda
- Subphylum: Chelicerata
- Class: Arachnida
- Order: Araneae
- Infraorder: Araneomorphae
- Family: Araneidae
- Genus: Celaenia
- Species: C. atkinsoni

Binomial name
- Celaenia atkinsoni (Pickard-Cambridge, 1880)

Synonyms
- Thlaosoma atkinsonii

= Celaenia atkinsoni =

Species of Arachnida

Celaenia atkinsoni is a species of Araneidae spider that is native to New Zealand and Australia.

== Taxonomy ==
This species was described as Thlaosoma atkinsonii in 1880 by Octavius Pickard-Cambridge from a single female specimen collected in New Zealand. In 1917 it was transferred to the Celaenia genus. It was most recently revised in 1987, in which male and female specimens were described from Australia.

== Description ==
This species is camouflaged to look like bird droppings. The carapace is light yellow with brown stripes on either side of the highest point on the carapace. The legs are yellowish with orange bands. The abdomen is white with brown markings.

== Distribution ==
This species is native to New Zealand and Australia.

== Conservation status ==
Under the New Zealand Threat Classification System, this species is listed as "Not Threatened" with the qualifier of "Secure Overseas".
