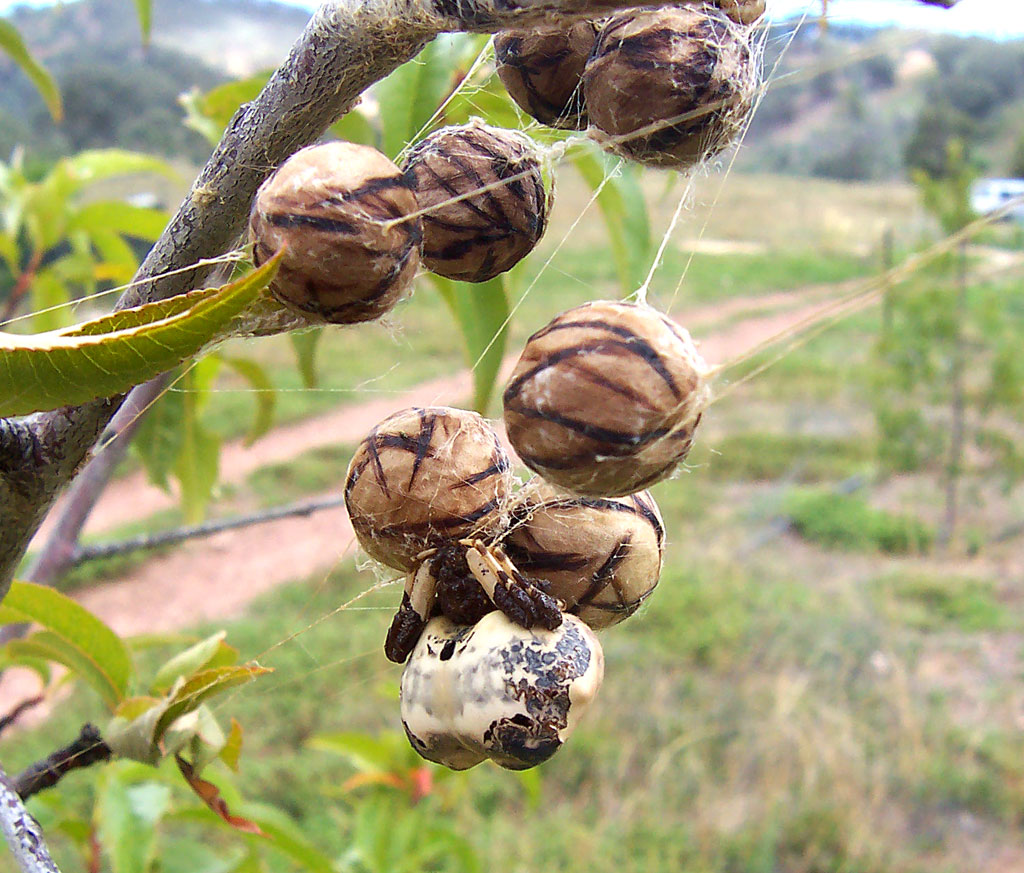
- Female bird dropping spider with egg sacs

Scientific classification
- Kingdom: Animalia
- Phylum: Arthropoda
- Subphylum: Chelicerata
- Class: Arachnida
- Order: Araneae
- Infraorder: Araneomorphae
- Family: Araneidae
- Genus: Celaenia
- Species: C. excavata

Binomial name
- Celaenia excavata L. Koch, 1867

= Celaenia excavata =

Bird dropping spider

Species of spider

Celaenia excavata, the bird dropping spider of Australia and New Zealand, derives its name from mimicking bird droppings to avoid predators, mainly birds.

== Habitat and appearance ==
Celaenia excavata is found throughout large parts of eastern and southern Australia and have also been recorded in central Australia; they are also seen in suburban gardens.

The males are much smaller than the females, about 2.5 mm as opposed to 12 mm. Their toxicity is unknown, but may be able to cause mild illness in humans.

The egg sacs of the bird-dropping spider are large, marbled brown spheres, each about 12 mm in diameter and containing over 200 eggs. Up to 13 sacs may be joined together in a group with silk, beneath which the spider may be found awaiting prey.

=== Hunting ===
Its diet consists almost exclusively of male moths, which it hunts at night by mimicking the scent of female moths.

The bird dropping spider stays motionless on its web during the day, only hunting for prey at night. It hangs down from a single silk thread and releases a pheromone which mimics the sex smells released by female moths. When a moth comes near, the spider will capture it with its powerful front legs.

== Conservation status ==
Under the New Zealand Threat Classification System, this species is listed as "Introduced and Naturalised" with the qualifier of "Secure Overseas".

== See also ==
- Bolas spider, which also resembles bird droppings
