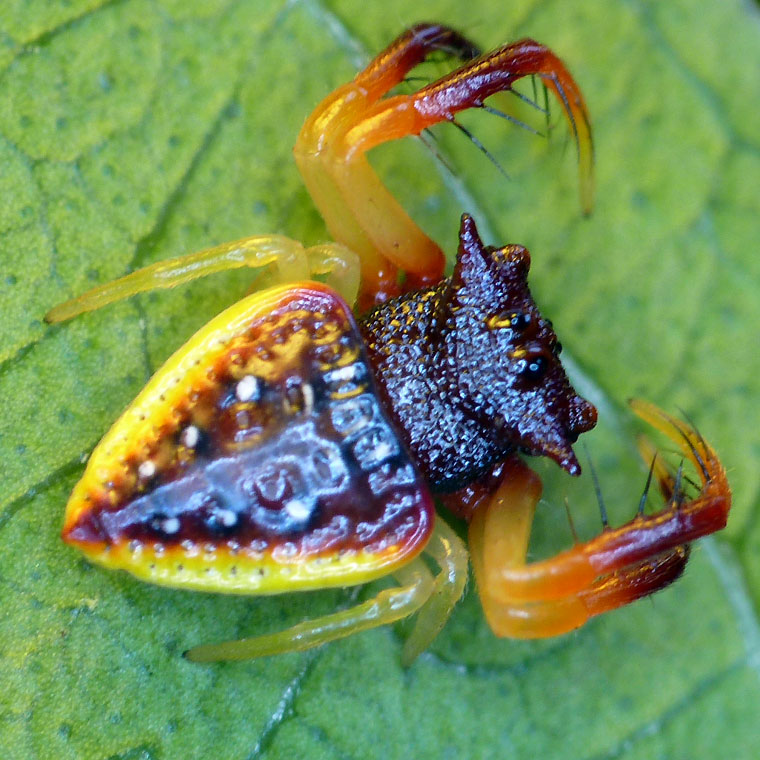

Scientific classification
- Domain: Eukaryota
- Kingdom: Animalia
- Phylum: Arthropoda
- Subphylum: Chelicerata
- Class: Arachnida
- Order: Araneae
- Infraorder: Araneomorphae
- Family: Arkyidae
- Genus: Arkys
- Species: A. cornutus

Binomial name
- Arkys cornutus L.Koch, 1872

= Arkys cornutus =

horned triangular spider

Species of spider

Arkys cornutus, the horned triangular spider, is a common Australian spider belonging to the family Arkyidae.

An ambush hunter, commonly found resting on leaves and fern. The front two pairs of legs are large and spined, suited for grabbing small insects, while the rear pairs of legs are smaller. The body length of males is smaller than the females, around 9 millimetres (0.35 in). Body colour varies from yellow or orange to red with pale spots on the heart shaped abdomen.
