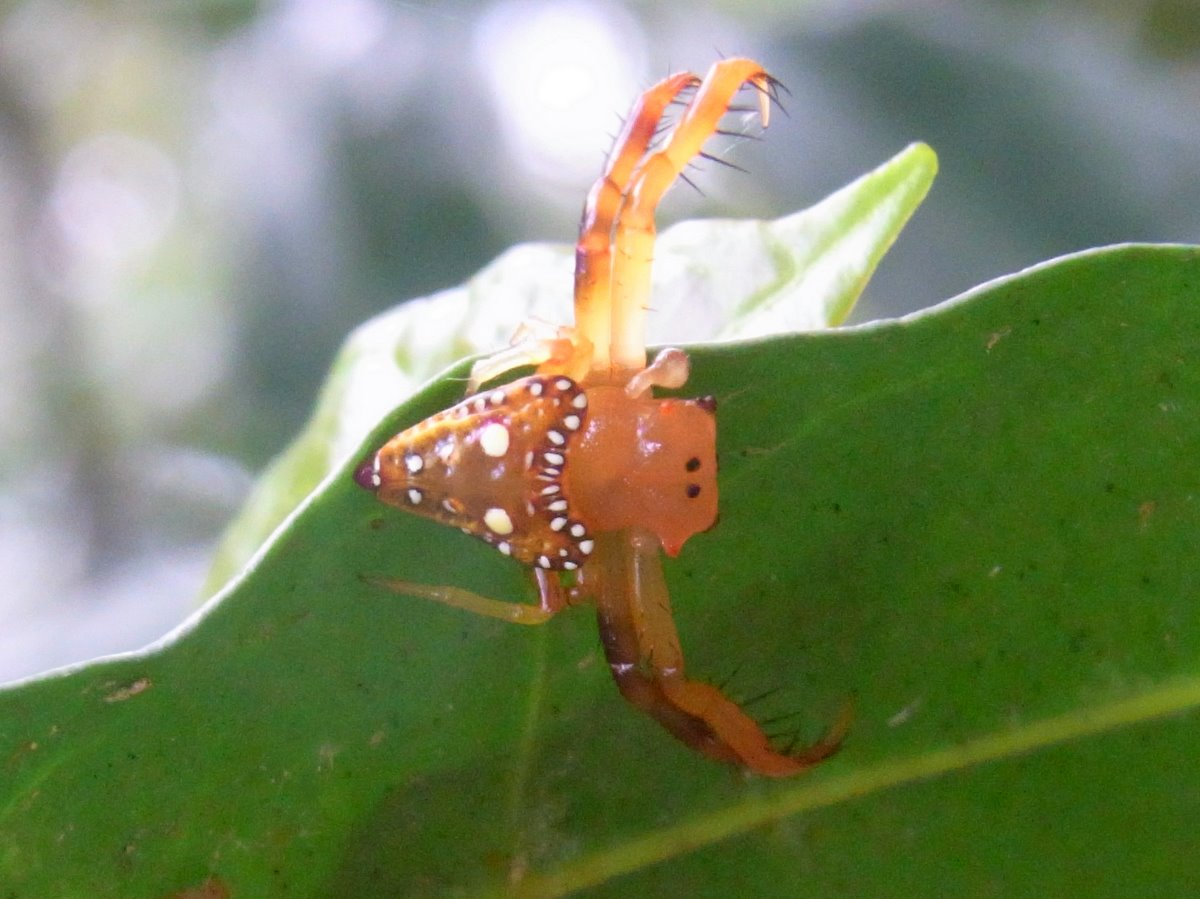
- Arkys lancearius
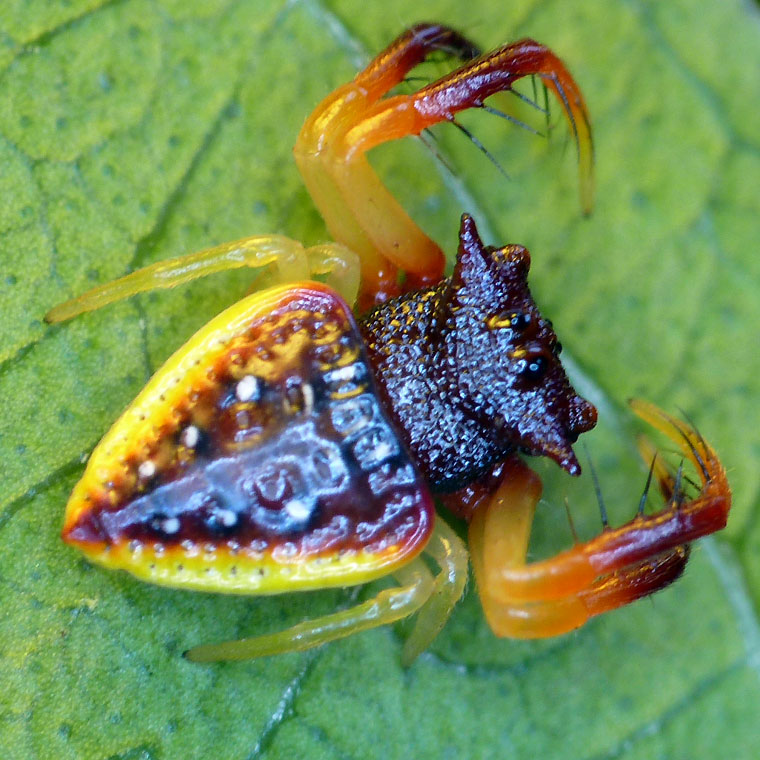
- A. cornutus

Scientific classification
- Kingdom: Animalia
- Phylum: Arthropoda
- Subphylum: Chelicerata
- Class: Arachnida
- Order: Araneae
- Infraorder: Araneomorphae
- Family: Arkyidae
- Genus: Arkys; Walckenaer, 1837

Type species
- A. lancearius Walckenaer, 1837

Species
- 32, see text

Synonyms
- Aerea Urquhart, 1891; Archemorus Simon, 1893; Neoarchemorus Mascord, 1968

= Arkys =

Genus of spiders

Arkys, also known as triangular spider or ambush spider, is a genus of Australian araneomorph spiders in the family Arkyidae, first described by Charles Athanase Walckenaer in 1837. They are often small, with a triangular shaped abdomen, and are found in Australia and some of its surrounding islands. They don't build webs, but can often be found on leaves and tips of flower heads. Their egg sacs are pinkish-orange and spherical, and are made late in the summer.

== Species ==
As of October 2025, this genus includes 32 species:

- Arkys alatus Keyserling, 1890 – Australia (Queensland, New South Wales)
- Arkys alticephala (Urquhart, 1891) – Southern Australia
- Arkys brevipalpus Karsch, 1878 – New Caledonia
- Arkys bulburinensis Heimer, 1984 – Australia (Queensland, New South Wales)
- Arkys cicatricosus (Rainbow, 1920) – Australia (Lord Howe Is.)
- Arkys cornutus L. Koch, 1872 – New Guinea, Australia (Queensland)
- Arkys coronatus (Balogh, 1978) – New Guinea
- Arkys curtulus (Simon, 1903) – Eastern Australia
- Arkys dilatatus (Balogh, 1978) – Australia (Queensland)
- Arkys enigma Douglas, 2019 – Australia (Tasmania)
- Arkys furcatus (Balogh, 1978) – Australia (Queensland)
- Arkys gracilis Heimer, 1984 – Australia (Queensland)
- Arkys grandis (Balogh, 1978) – New Caledonia
- Arkys hickmani Heimer, 1984 – Australia (Tasmania)
- Arkys kaszabi (Balogh, 1978) – New Guinea
- Arkys lancearius Walckenaer, 1837 – New Guinea to Australia (New South Wales) (type species)
- Arkys latissimus (Balogh, 1982) – Australia (Queensland)
- Arkys montanus (Balogh, 1978) – New Guinea
- Arkys multituberculatus (Balogh, 1982) – Australia (Queensland)
- Arkys nimdol Chrysanthus, 1971 – New Guinea
- Arkys occidentalis (Reimoser, 1936) – Indonesia (Buru Is.)
- Arkys roosdorpi (Chrysanthus, 1971) – New Guinea
- Arkys semicirculatus (Balogh, 1982) – Australia (Queensland)
- Arkys sibil (Chrysanthus, 1971) – New Guinea
- Arkys soosi (Balogh, 1982) – New Guinea
- Arkys speechleyi (Mascord, 1968) – Australia (New South Wales)
- Arkys toxopeusi (Reimoser, 1936) – Indonesia (Buru Is.)
- Arkys transversus (Balogh, 1978) – Australia (New South Wales)
- Arkys tuberculatus (Balogh, 1978) – Australia (Queensland)
- Arkys varians (Balogh, 1978) – New Caledonia
- Arkys vicarius (Balogh, 1978) – New Caledonia
- Arkys walckenaeri Simon, 1879 – Australia
