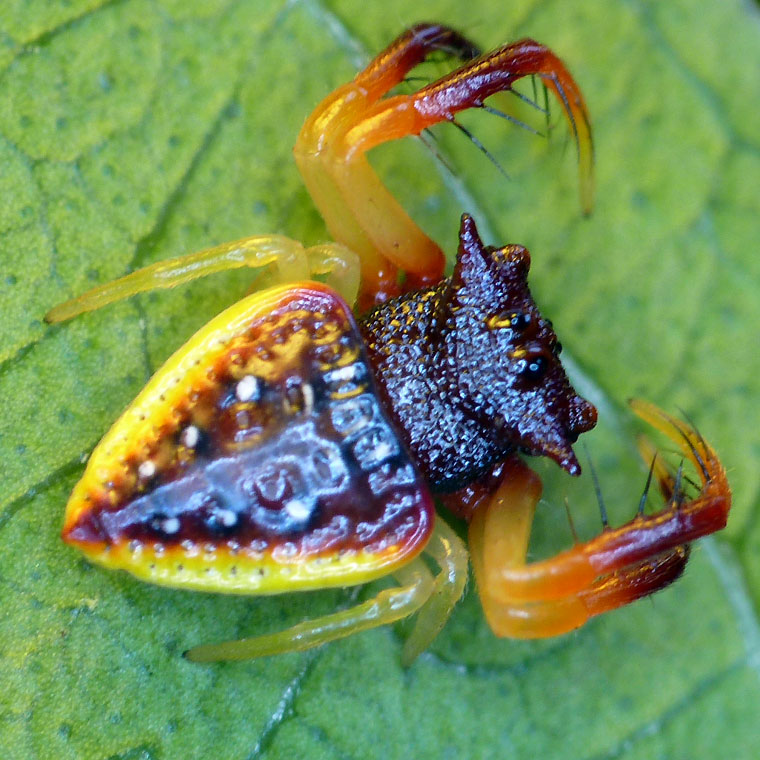
- Arkys cornutus
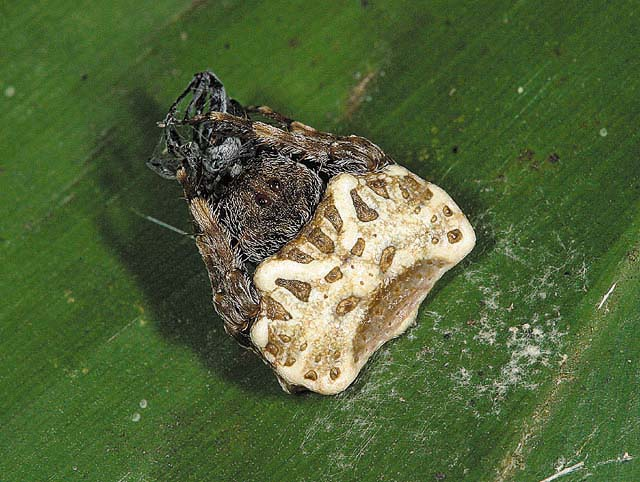
- Arkys sp. from New Guinea

Scientific classification
- Kingdom: Animalia
- Phylum: Arthropoda
- Subphylum: Chelicerata
- Class: Arachnida
- Order: Araneae
- Infraorder: Araneomorphae
- Family: Arkyidae; L. Koch, 1872

Genera
- Arkys Walckenaer, 1837; Demadiana Strand, 1929

Diversity
- 2 genera, 38 species
- blue: reported countries (WSC) green: observation hotspots (iNaturalist)

= Arkyidae =

Family of spiders

Arkyidae, also known as triangular spiders, is a family of araneomorph spiders first described by Ludwig Carl Christian Koch in 1872 as a subfamily of Araneidae, and later elevated to a full family in 2017.

== Genera ==
As of January 2026, this family includes two genera and 38 species:

- Arkys Walckenaer, 1837 – Indonesia, Australia, New Caledonia, New Guinea
- Demadiana Strand, 1929 – Australia
