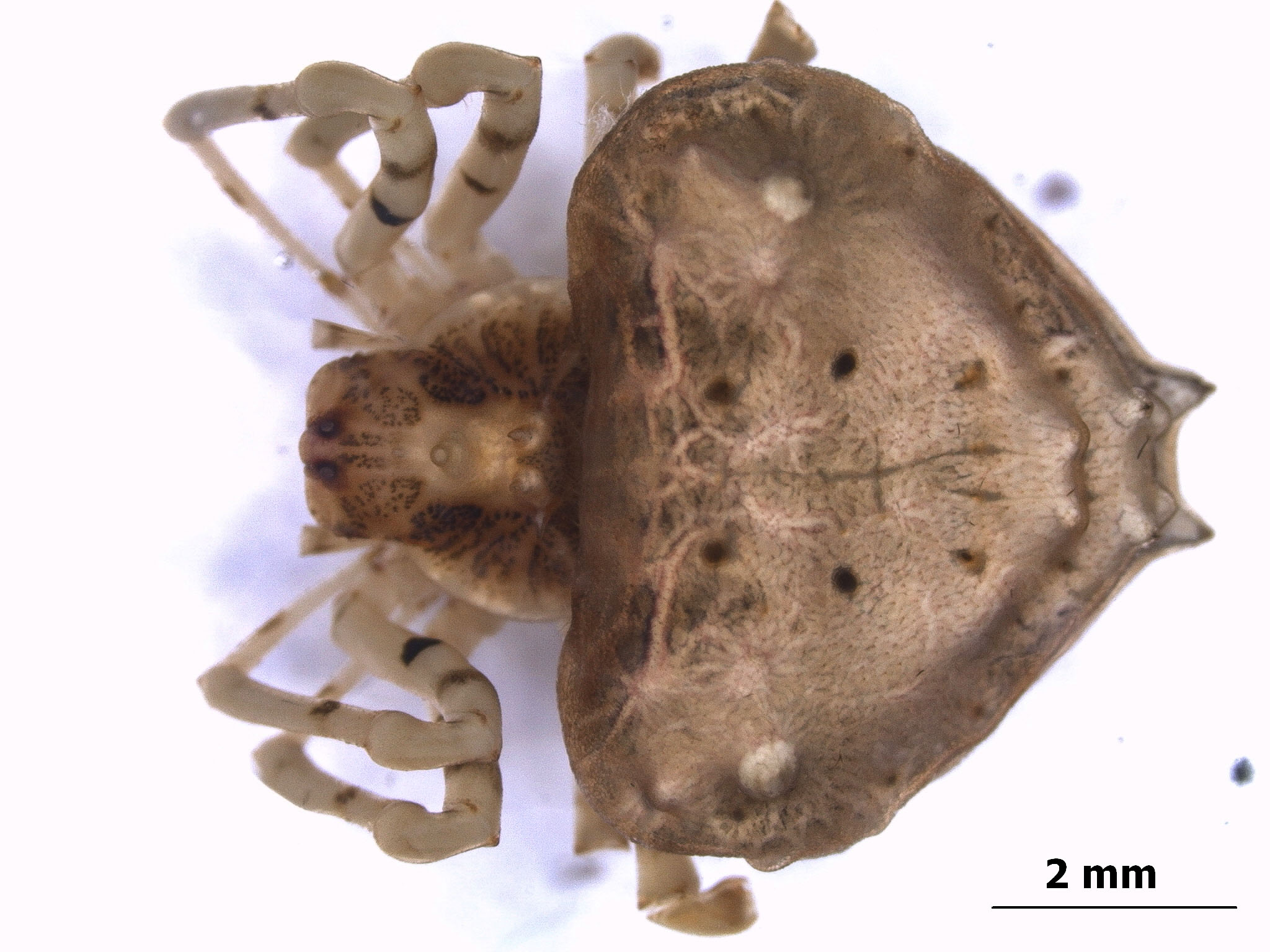
- Female

Scientific classification
- Kingdom: Animalia
- Phylum: Arthropoda
- Subphylum: Chelicerata
- Class: Arachnida
- Order: Araneae
- Infraorder: Araneomorphae
- Family: Araneidae
- Genus: Ordgarius
- Species: O. sexspinosus

Binomial name
- Ordgarius sexspinosus (Thorell, 1894)

Synonyms
- Notocentria sex-spinosa Thorell, 1894; Caerostris cuspidata Workman, 1896; Euglyptila nigrithorax Simon, 1909; Cladomelea mundhva Tikader, 1963

= Ordgarius sexspinosus =

Species of spider

Ordgarius sexspinosus is a species of spider in the orb-weaver spider family Araneidae, found from India to Japan and Indonesia. O. sexspinosus is a bolas spider. Rather than using a web, adult females catch their prey by using a line with one or two sticky drops (a "bolas") which they swing.

== Description ==
The adult female of Ordgarius sexspinosus has a body length of about 7–10 mm. The carapace is about 3.6–3.7 mm long. It is dark brown and has six projections (tubercules). Two are arranged in the centre of the cephalic (head) part of the cephalothorax, the larger behind the smaller. Four are arranged in a transverse row in the thoracic part, two projecting forwards and two slightly behind projecting sideways. The legs are yellowish brown with brown rings. The first leg is the longest. The abdomen is usually longer (up to 6.9 mm) than wide. The upper surface is grayish brown with complicated white patterns. The "shoulders" of the abdomen are humped. The epigyne has a distinct ring, and no scape. The male has a body length of about 2 mm or less. The carapace is dark brown with black markings. The upper surface of the abdomen is also dark brown, with darker and lighter mottling. The underside of the abdomen is darker and has a pair of white spots. The embolus of the palpal bulb is spine-like.

== Taxonomy ==
Ordgarius sexspinosus was first described by Tamerlan Thorell in 1894, as Notocentria sex-spinosa, the only species in his new genus Notocentria. Notocentria was synonymized with Ordgarius by Eugène Simon in 1895. The genus Ordgarius has been placed in the broadly defined subfamily Cyrtarachninae, and, as a bolas spider, would be expected to fall within the informal group of mastophorines, although not included in the molecular phylogenetic study that defined this group.

== Prey capture ==
Like the rest of the genus Ordgarius, O. sexspinosus is a bolas spider, catching its prey using one or more sticky drops on a line (a "bolas") rather than with a web. Adult females place a few horizontal lines of silk between twigs or leaves and then hang their bolas from it. They capture prey (usually a male moth) when it approaches by whorling the bolas using a second leg. There is evidence to suggest that, like related genera, Ordgarius can produce a mimic of the sex pheromone used by a female moth to attract a male.
