= Ordgarius monstrosus =

Scientific classification
- Kingdom: Animalia
- Phylum: Arthropoda
- Subphylum: Chelicerata
- Class: Arachnida
- Order: Araneae
- Infraorder: Araneomorphae
- Family: Araneidae
- Genus: Ordgarius
- Species: O. monstrosus

Binomial name
- Ordgarius monstrosus Keyserling, 1886

Species of spider

Ordgarius monstrosus is a species of spider in the orb-weaver spider family Araneidae, found in Queensland, Australia. O. monstrosus is a bolas spider. Rather than using a web, adult females catch their prey by using a line with one or two sticky drops (a "bolas") which they swing.

== Description ==
A female described in 1886 had a total length of 13.0 mm. The cephalothorax was 5.0 mm long and almost as wide. Its upper surface was reddish brown, with white hairs and five projections, a long forward-pointing one at the front and four smaller ones behind. The two rows of eyes were slightly recurved. The sternum was longer than wide, and was yellow with brown tints, as were the chelicerae. The legs were yellow with brown rings, mostly not fully closed, and were covered with fine white hairs. The first leg was longest, with a total length of 15.5 mm. The abdomen was wider (10.2 mm) than long (9.6 mm). Its upper surface was yellow with brown spots and indistinct bands. The corners had distinct humps. The underside of the abdomen was solid yellow.

== Taxonomy ==
Ordgarius monstrosus was first described by Eugen von Keyserling in 1886. It was the first species described in his new genus Ordgarius. The genus has been placed in the broadly defined subfamily Cyrtarachninae, and, as a bolas spider, would be expected to fall within the informal group of mastophorines, although not included in the molecular phylogenetic study that defined this group.

== Prey capture ==
Like the rest of the genus Ordgarius, O. monstrosus is a bolas spider, catching its prey using one or more sticky drops on a line (a "bolas") rather than with a web. Adult females capture prey (usually a male moth) when it approaches by whorling the bolas using a second leg. There is evidence to suggest that, like related genera, Ordgarius can produce a mimic of the sex pheromone used by a female moth to attract a male.
