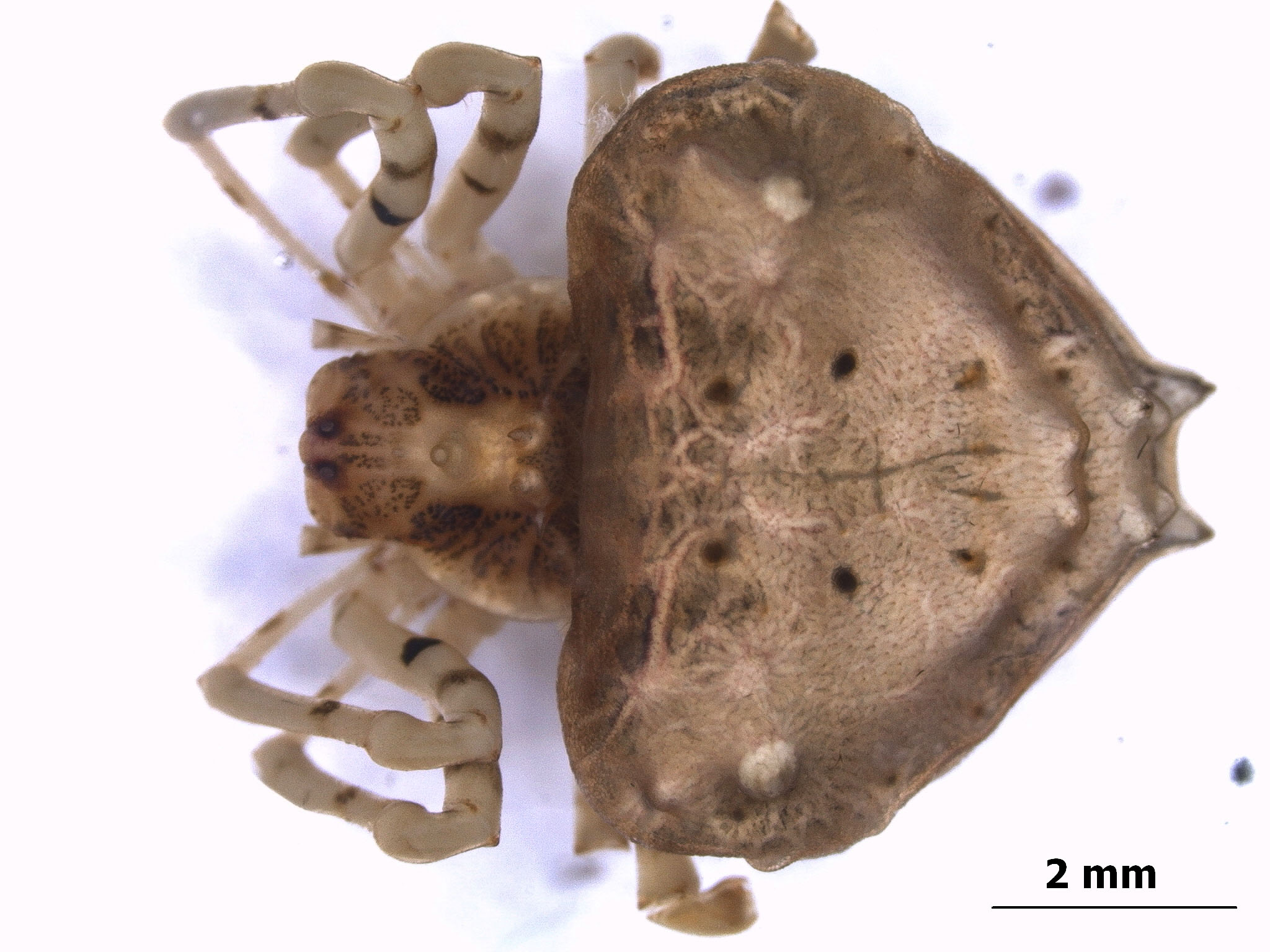
- Female Ordgarius sexspinosus

Scientific classification
- Kingdom: Animalia
- Phylum: Arthropoda
- Subphylum: Chelicerata
- Class: Arachnida
- Order: Araneae
- Infraorder: Araneomorphae
- Family: Araneidae
- Subfamily: Cyrtarachninae s.l.
- Genus: Ordgarius; Keyserling, 1886

Type species
- O. monstrosus Keyserling, 1886

Species
- 14, see text

Synonyms
- Dicrostichus Simon, 1895; Euglyptila Simon, 1909; Notocentria Thorell, 1894

= Ordgarius =

Genus of spiders

Ordgarius is a genus of orb-weaver spiders first described by Eugen von Keyserling in 1886. Adult females of the genus are bolas spiders, capturing their prey with one or more sticky drops at the end of a single line of silk rather than in a web. Males and juvenile females capture their prey directly with their legs.

== Species ==
As of November 2026 it contains fourteen species:

- Ordgarius acanthonotus (Simon, 1909) – Vietnam
- Ordgarius bicolor Pocock, 1899 – New Britain
- Ordgarius bo Lin & Li, 2022 – China
- Ordgarius clypeatus Simon, 1897 – Ambon
- Ordgarius ephippiatus Thorell, 1898 – Myanmar
- Ordgarius furcatus (O. Pickard-Cambridge, 1877) – New South Wales
  - Ordgarius f. distinctus (Rainbow, 1900) – New South Wales
- Ordgarius hexaspinus Saha & Raychaudhuri, 2004 – India
- Ordgarius hobsoni (O. Pickard-Cambridge, 1877) – India, Sri Lanka, China, Japan
- Ordgarius liyuanba Lin & Li, 2022 – Hainan
- Ordgarius magnificus (Rainbow, 1897) – Queensland, New South Wales
- Ordgarius monstrosus Keyserling, 1886 – Queensland
- Ordgarius pustulosus Thorell, 1897 – Java
- Ordgarius sexspinosus (Thorell, 1894) – India to Japan, Indonesia
