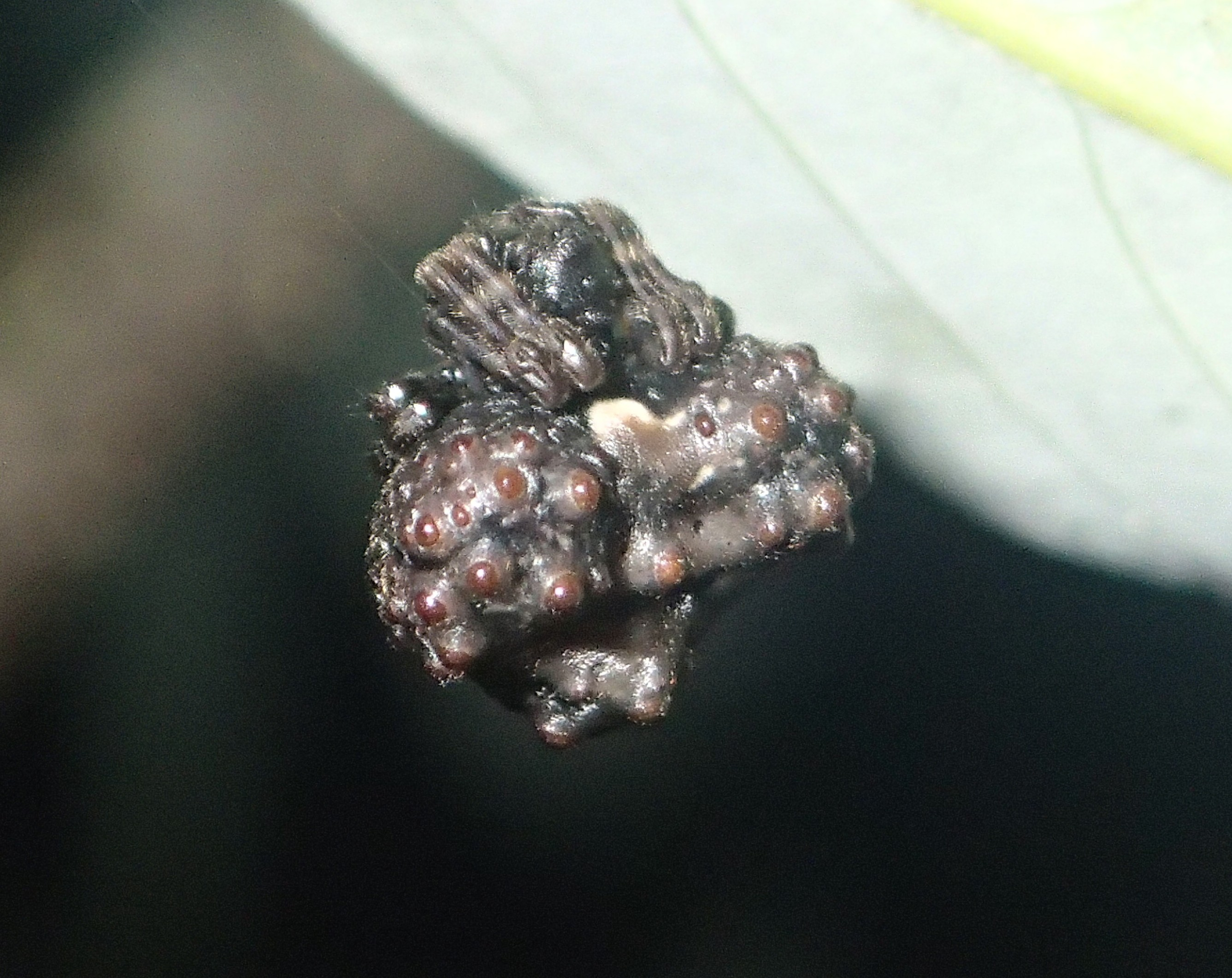

Scientific classification
- Kingdom: Animalia
- Phylum: Arthropoda
- Subphylum: Chelicerata
- Class: Arachnida
- Order: Araneae
- Infraorder: Araneomorphae
- Family: Araneidae
- Genus: Ordgarius
- Species: O. hobsoni

Binomial name
- Ordgarius hobsoni (O. Pickard-Cambridge, 1877)

= Ordgarius hobsoni =

Species of spider

Ordgarius hobsoni is a species of spider of the genus Ordgarius in the family Araneidae. One of a number of spiders known as a bolas spider, it is found in India, Sri Lanka, China, and Japan.

Unlike many araneids, they do not spin a typical orb web. Instead, they hunt by using a sticky 'capture blob' of silk on the end of a line, known as a 'bolas', hence the English name.
