= List of Atypidae species =

This page lists all described species of the spider family Atypidae accepted by the World Spider Catalog as of December 2020:

== Atypus ==
Atypus

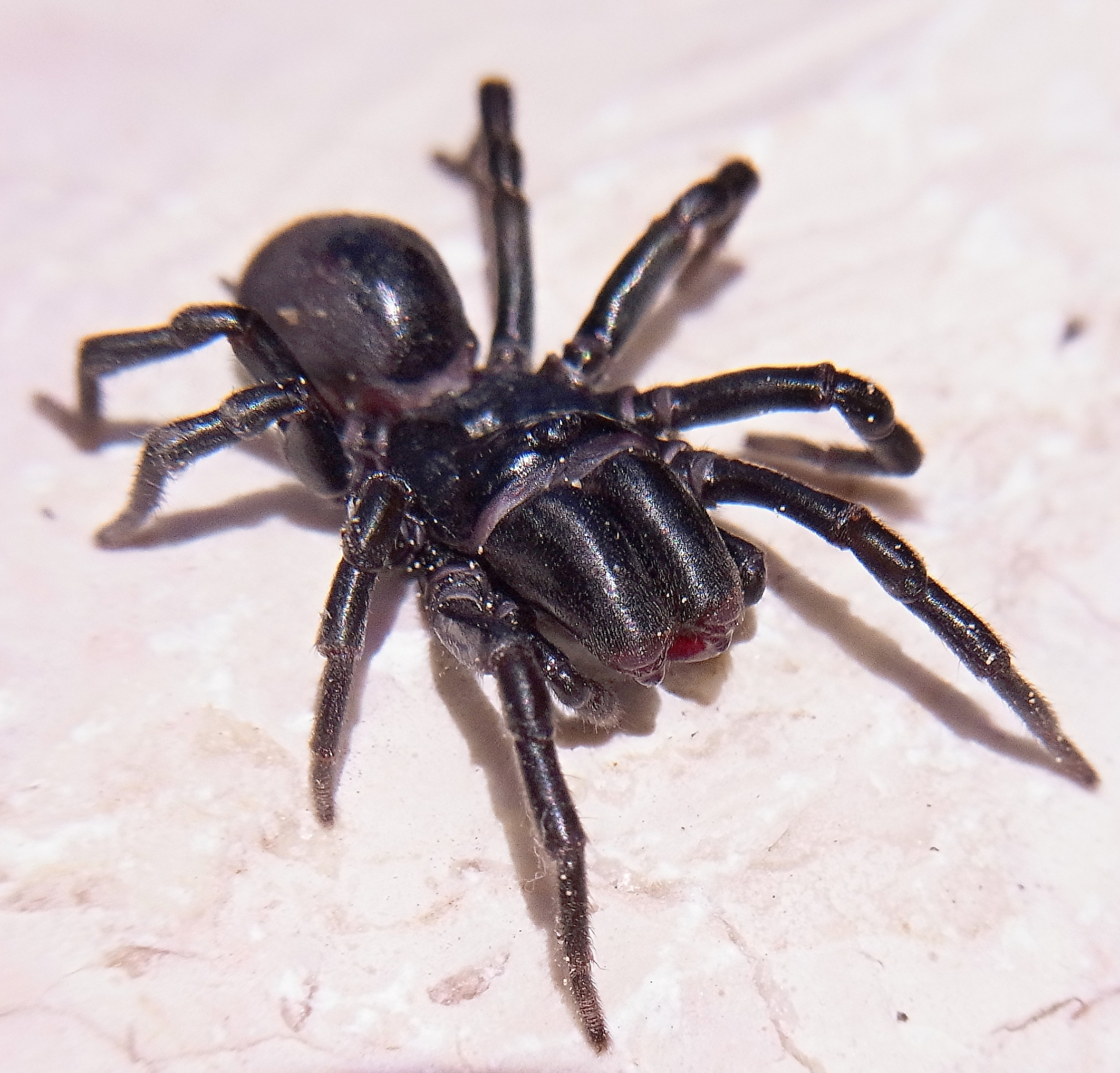
Atypus affinis

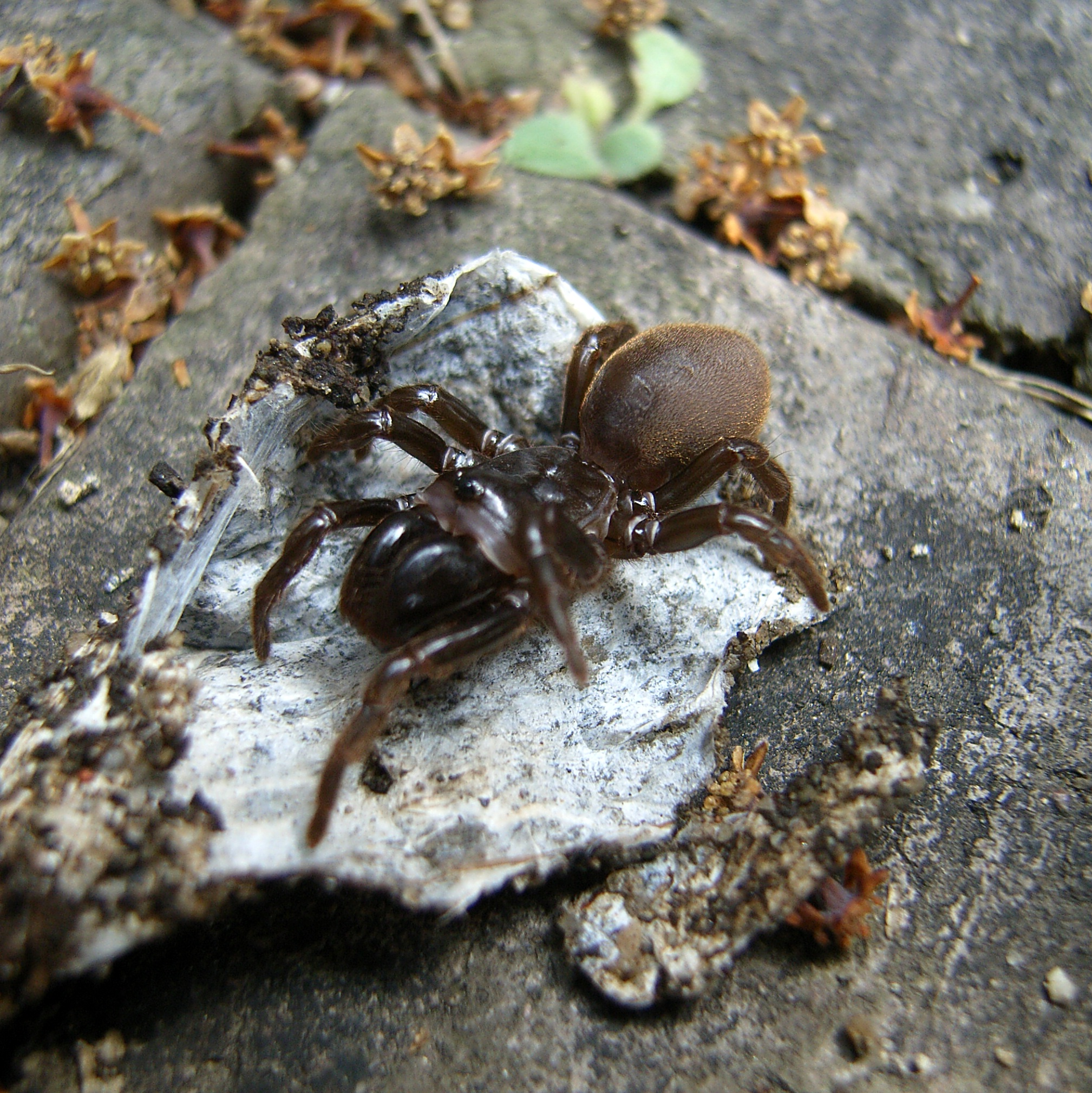
Tsuchi-gumo (Atypus karschi)

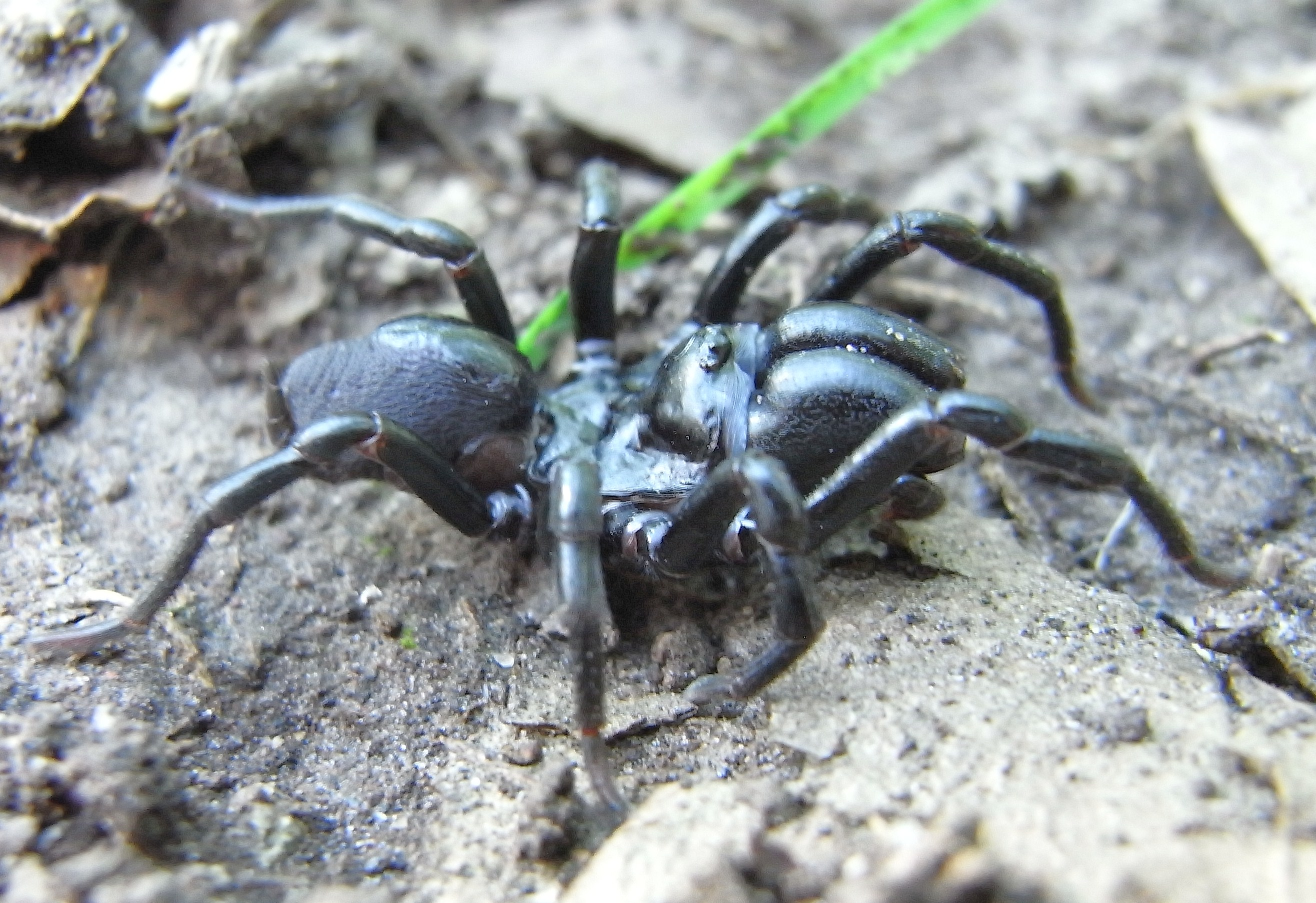
Atypus piceus

Atypus Latreille, 1804

- A. affinis Eichwald, 1830 — Europe (Ireland to Ukraine), North Africa
- A. baotianmanensis Hu, 1994 — China
- A. baotingensis Li, Xu, Zhang, Liu, Zhang & Li, 2018 — China (Hainan)
- A. coreanus Kim, 1985 — Korea
- A. dorsualis Thorell, 1897 — Myanmar, Thailand
- A. flexus Zhu, Zhang, Song & Qu, 2006 — China
- A. formosensis Kayashima, 1943 — Taiwan
- A. heterothecus Zhang, 1985 — China
- A. javanus Thorell, 1890 — Indonesia (Java)
- A. jianfengensis Li, Xu, Zhang, Liu, Zhang & Li, 2018 — China (Hainan)
- A. karschi Dönitz, 1887 — Korea, China, Taiwan, Japan
- A. lannaianus Schwendinger, 1989 — Thailand
- A. largosaccatus Zhu, Zhang, Song & Qu, 2006 — China
- A. ledongensis Zhu, Zhang, Song & Qu, 2006 — China
- A. magnus Namkung, 1986 — Russia (Far East), Korea
- A. medius Oliger, 1999 — Russia (Far East)
- A. minutus Lee, Lee, Yoo & Kim, 2015 — Korea
- A. muralis Bertkau, 1890 — Central Europe to Turkmenistan
- A. pedicellatus Zhu, Zhang, Song & Qu, 2006 — China
- A. piceus (Sulzer, 1776) (type) — Europe (France to Russia), Iran
- A. quelpartensis Namkung, 2002 — Korea
- A. sacculatus Zhu, Zhang, Song & Qu, 2006 — China
- A. seogwipoensis Kim, Ye & Noh, 2015 — Korea
- A. sinensis Schenkel, 1953 — China
- A. snetsingeri Sarno, 1973 — USA
- A. sternosulcus Kim, Kim, Jung & Lee, 2006 — Korea
- A. suiningensis Zhang, 1985 — China
- A. suthepicus Schwendinger, 1989 — Thailand
- A. sutherlandi Chennappaiya, 1935 — India
- A. suwonensis Kim, Kim, Jung & Lee, 2006 — Korea
- A. tibetensis Zhu, Zhang, Song & Qu, 2006 — China
- A. wataribabaorum Tanikawa, 2006 — Japan
- A. wii Siliwal, Kumar & Raven, 2014 — India
- A. yajuni Zhu, Zhang, Song & Qu, 2006 — China
- † A. juvenis Wunderlich, 2011

== Calommata ==
Calommata

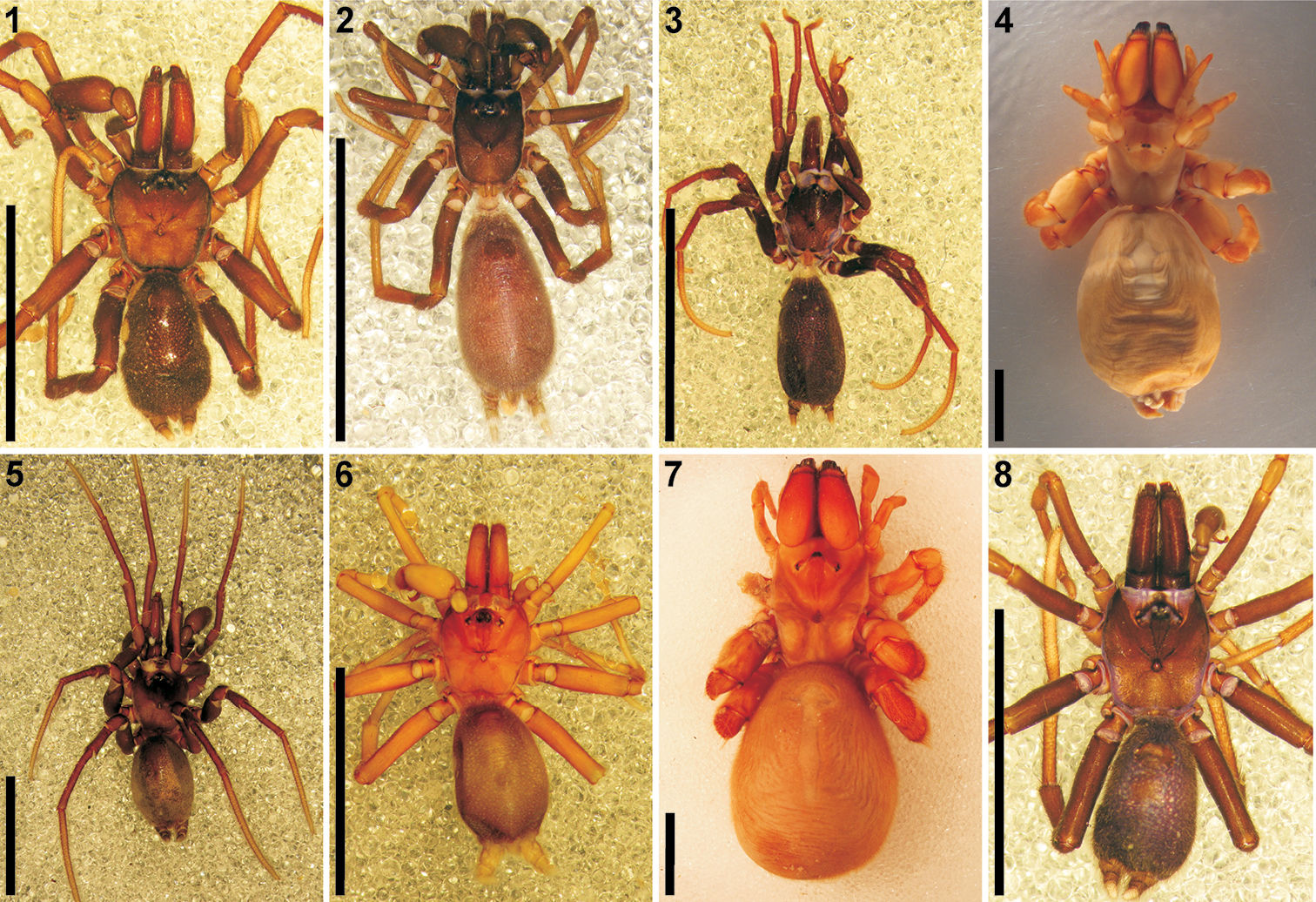
from left to right, top to bottom:

TOP
1) Calommata megae, male
2) Calommata meridionalis, male
3) Calommata namibica, male
4) Calommata simoni, female
BOTTOM
5) Calommata simoni, male
6) Calommata tibialis, male
7) Calommata transvaalica, female

8) Calommata transvaalica, male

Calommata Lucas, 1837

- C. fulvipes (Lucas, 1835) (type) — Indonesia (Java, Sumatra)
- C. megae Fourie, Haddad & Jocqué, 2011 — Zimbabwe
- C. meridionalis Fourie, Haddad & Jocqué, 2011 — South Africa
- C. namibica Fourie, Haddad & Jocqué, 2011 — Namibia
- C. obesa Simon, 1886 — Thailand
- C. pichoni Schenkel, 1963 — China
- C. signata Karsch, 1879 — China, Korea, Japan
- C. simoni Pocock, 1903 — West, Central, East Africa
- C. sundaica (Doleschall, 1859) — Indonesia (Java, Sumatra), Israel
- C. tamdaoensis Zha, Pham & Li, 2012 — Vietnam
- C. tibialis Fourie, Haddad & Jocqué, 2011 — Ivory Coast, Togo
- C. transvaalica (Hewitt, 1916) — South Africa
- C. truculenta (Thorell, 1887) — Myanmar

== Sphodros ==
Sphodros

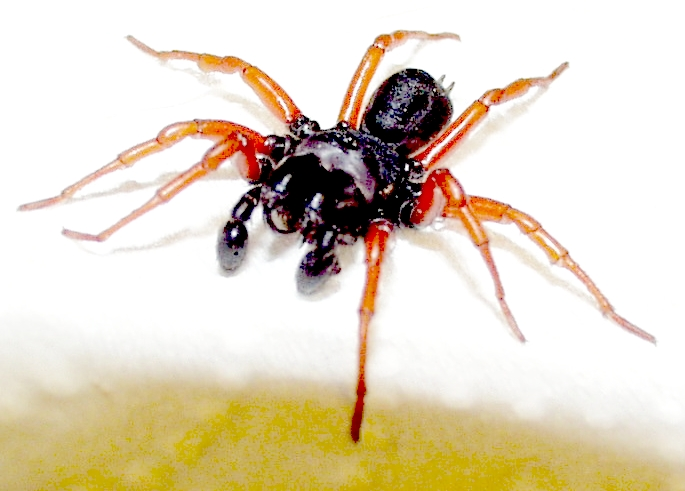
Red-legged purse-web spider (S. rufipes)

Sphodros Walckenaer, 1835

- S. abboti Walckenaer, 1835 (type) — USA
- S. atlanticus Gertsch & Platnick, 1980 — USA
- S. coylei Gertsch & Platnick, 1980 — USA
- S. fitchi Gertsch & Platnick, 1980 — USA
- S. niger (Hentz, 1842) — USA, Canada
- S. paisano Gertsch & Platnick, 1980 — USA, Mexico
- S. rufipes (Latreille, 1829) — USA
