= S. nigra =

S. nigra is an abbreviation of a species name. In binomial nomenclature the name of a species is always the name of the genus to which the species belongs, followed by the species name (also called the species epithet). In S. nigra the genus name has been abbreviated to S. and the species has been spelled out in full. In a document that uses this abbreviation it should always be clear from the context which genus name has been abbreviated.

The Latin species epithet nigra means "black". Some of the most common uses of S. nigra are:

- Salix nigra, a species of willow
- Sambucus nigra, a species of elder (elderberry)

There are many other possibilities, for example, the following genus names that start with S have a species name with the epithet nigra.

Vascular plants:

- Sapota nigra
- Schisandra nigra
- Schnella nigra
- Serapias nigra
- Setachna nigra
- Sieberia nigra
- Sinapis nigra
- Siparuna nigra
- Smilax nigra
- Stenogyne nigra
- Struthiopteris nigra
- Suaeda nigra

Beetles:

- Saperda nigra
- Stenomordellaria nigra
- Stenurella nigra

Other organisms:

- Sarinda nigra, a spider
- Scoparia nigra, a butterfly
- Scutellospora, a fungus
- Siphamia nigra, a fish
- Stegana nigra, a fly
- Strumigenys nigra, an ant

== See also ==
- Solanum nigrum
- Sorghum nigrum
- S. niger (disambiguation)
- Nigra (disambiguation)
