= S. niger =

S. niger is an abbreviation of a species name. In binomial nomenclature, the name of a species is always the name of the genus to which the species belongs, followed by the species name (also called the species epithet). In S. niger, the genus name has been abbreviated to S. and the species has been spelled out in full. In a document that uses this abbreviation, it should always be clear from the context which genus name has been abbreviated.

The Latin species epithet niger means "black". Some of the most common uses of S. niger are:

- Sciurus niger, the fox squirrel, the largest species of tree squirrel
- Serrasalmus niger, a synonym of Serrasalmus rhombeus, the redeye piranha
- Sphodros niger, the black purse-web spider, a mygalomorph spider species from the eastern United States
- Streptanthus niger, an endangered plant species

There are many other possibilities, for example the following genus names that start with S have a species name with the epithet niger.

Vascular plants:

- Sicyos niger
- Strophanthus niger
- Syngonanthus niger

Beetles:

- Sennius niger
- Spermophagus niger
- Stenoluperus niger
- Syllitus niger

Spiders:

- Sphodros niger
- Stertinius niger
- Stiphropus niger

Other organisms:

- Saccharomyces niger, a yeast
- Saguinus niger, a monkey
- Scarus niger, a fish
- Scutovertex niger, a mite
- Siganus niger, a fish
- Stomoxys niger, an African biting fly
- Streptomyces niger, a bacterium
- Synsphyronus niger, a pseudoscorpion

== See also ==
- Niger (disambiguation)
- Solanum nigrum
- Sorghum nigrum
