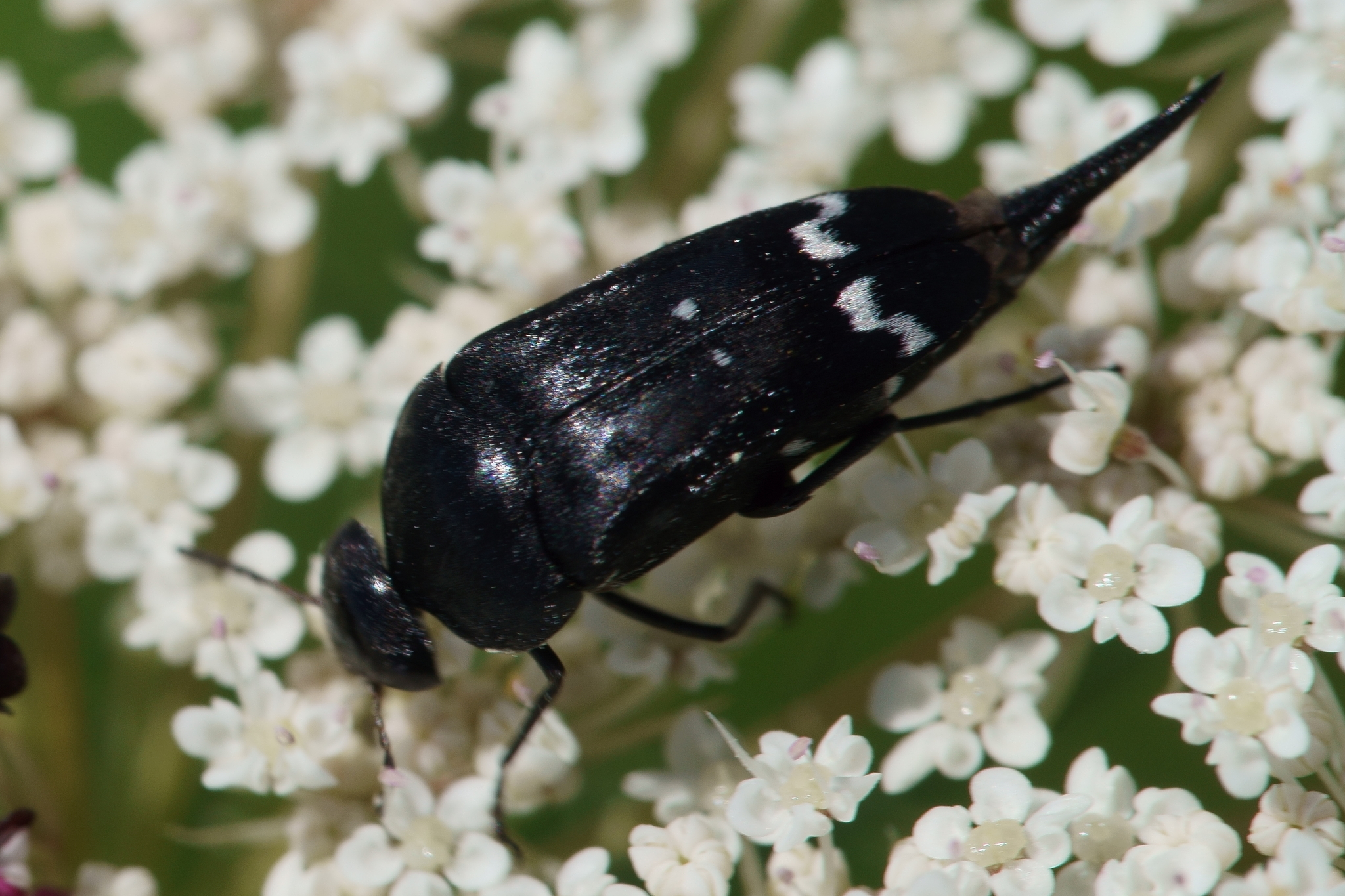
- Hoshihananomia antarctica, New Zealand

Scientific classification
- Kingdom: Animalia
- Phylum: Arthropoda
- Class: Insecta
- Order: Coleoptera
- Suborder: Polyphaga
- Infraorder: Cucujiformia
- Family: Mordellidae
- Subfamily: Mordellinae
- Tribe: Mordellini
- Genus: Hoshihananomia
- Species: H. antarctica

Binomial name
- Hoshihananomia antarctica (White 1846)

= Hoshihananomia antarctica =

Species of beetles

Hoshihananomia antarctica is a species of tumbling flower beetle in the family Mordellidae, found in New Zealand.
