= Sphodros fitchi =

Scientific classification
- Kingdom: Animalia
- Phylum: Arthropoda
- Subphylum: Chelicerata
- Class: Arachnida
- Order: Araneae
- Infraorder: Mygalomorphae
- Family: Atypidae
- Genus: Sphodros
- Species: S. fitchi

Binomial name
- Sphodros fitchi Gertsch & Platnick, 1980

Species of spider

Sphodros fitchi is a species of purseweb spider in the family Atypidae. It is found in the USA.
