= Sphodros atlanticus =

Scientific classification
- Kingdom: Animalia
- Phylum: Arthropoda
- Subphylum: Chelicerata
- Class: Arachnida
- Order: Araneae
- Infraorder: Mygalomorphae
- Family: Atypidae
- Genus: Sphodros
- Species: S. atlanticus

Binomial name
- Sphodros atlanticus Gertsch & Platnick, 1980

Species of spider

Sphodros atlanticus is a species of spiders from the family Atypidae. It was described by Willis J. Gertsch and Norman I. Platnick in 1980. The species was described from specimens found in Georgia, North Carolina, Virginia and Illinois. It has also been found in Maryland and Alabama.

== Description ==
The spider's colour is black. Female spiders are typically uniformly brown, while the male spiders have black femora and red lower legs.
