= Sphodros abboti =

Scientific classification
- Kingdom: Animalia
- Phylum: Arthropoda
- Subphylum: Chelicerata
- Class: Arachnida
- Order: Araneae
- Infraorder: Mygalomorphae
- Family: Atypidae
- Genus: Sphodros
- Species: S. abboti

Binomial name
- Sphodros abboti Walckenaer, 1835

Species of spider

Sphodros abboti also known as purseweb spider, is a species of spiders from a family of Atypidae. It was described by Charles Athanase Walckenaer in 1835 and is endemic to Florida, United States.

== Description ==
The spider is generally black coloured. The abdomen of the female has a purple tinge, the abdomen of the male is blue. Like in other mygalomorph spiders the eight eyes are situated closely together in two groups close to the frontal edge of the carapace.

== Habitat ==
They construct webs on the middle part of a tree, that remind people of short vines.
