= Hoshihananomia pirika =

Scientific classification
- Kingdom: Animalia
- Phylum: Arthropoda
- Clade: Pancrustacea
- Class: Insecta
- Order: Coleoptera
- Suborder: Polyphaga
- Infraorder: Cucujiformia
- Family: Mordellidae
- Genus: Hoshihananomia
- Species: H. pirika

Binomial name
- Hoshihananomia pirika Kôno, 1935

Species of beetle

Hoshihananomia pirika is a species of beetle in the genus Hoshihananomia of the family Mordellidae, which is part of the superfamily Tenebrionoidea. It was discovered in 1935.

The species was originally described from Hokkaido, Japan, with the holotype collected at Yamakoshinai. Kono described it as having a black body with partly white hairs and four snow-white spots on each elytron, the pronotum bears a white transverse band and two longitudinal spots, while the scutellum is densely covered with white hairs. The described body length is 10.5 mm, excluding the pygidium.
