= Hoshihananomia multiguttata =

Scientific classification
- Domain: Eukaryota
- Kingdom: Animalia
- Phylum: Arthropoda
- Class: Insecta
- Order: Coleoptera
- Suborder: Polyphaga
- Infraorder: Cucujiformia
- Family: Mordellidae
- Genus: Hoshihananomia
- Species: H. multiguttata

Binomial name
- Hoshihananomia multiguttata (Waterhouse), 1878

Synonyms
- Mordella multiguttata Waterhouse 1878

Species of beetle

Hoshihananomia multiguttata is a species of tumbling flower beetles of the family Mordellidae. It was discovered in 1878.
