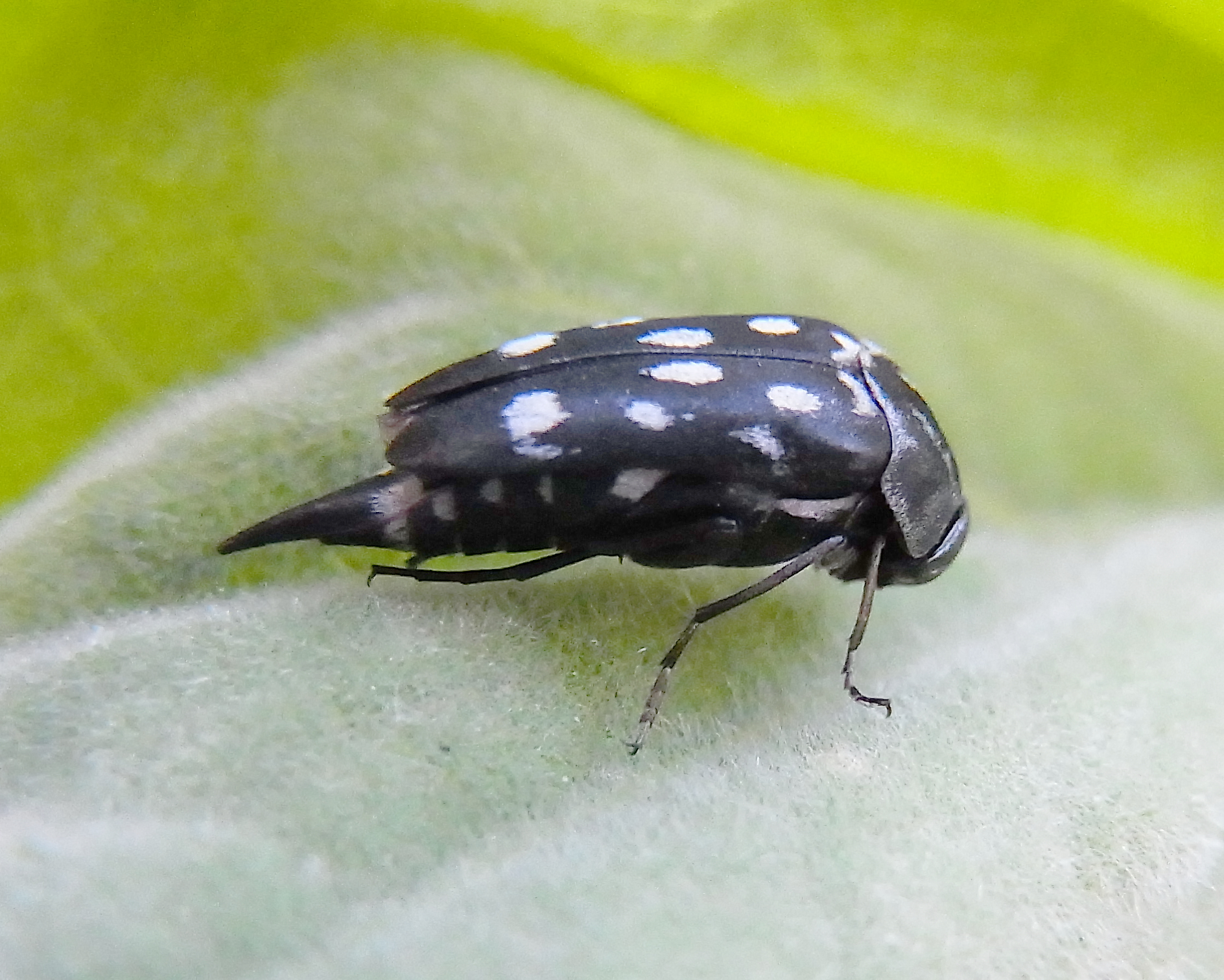
- Hoshihananomia perlata

Scientific classification
- Domain: Eukaryota
- Kingdom: Animalia
- Phylum: Arthropoda
- Class: Insecta
- Order: Coleoptera
- Suborder: Polyphaga
- Infraorder: Cucujiformia
- Family: Mordellidae
- Subfamily: Mordellinae
- Tribe: Mordellini
- Genus: Hoshihananomia; Kônô, 1935

Synonyms
- Machairophora Franciscolo, 1943; Machairorophora Franciscolo, 1943

= Hoshihananomia =

Genus of beetles

Hoshihananomia is a genus of tumbling flower beetles in the family Mordellidae. There are more than 35 described species in Hoshihananomia.

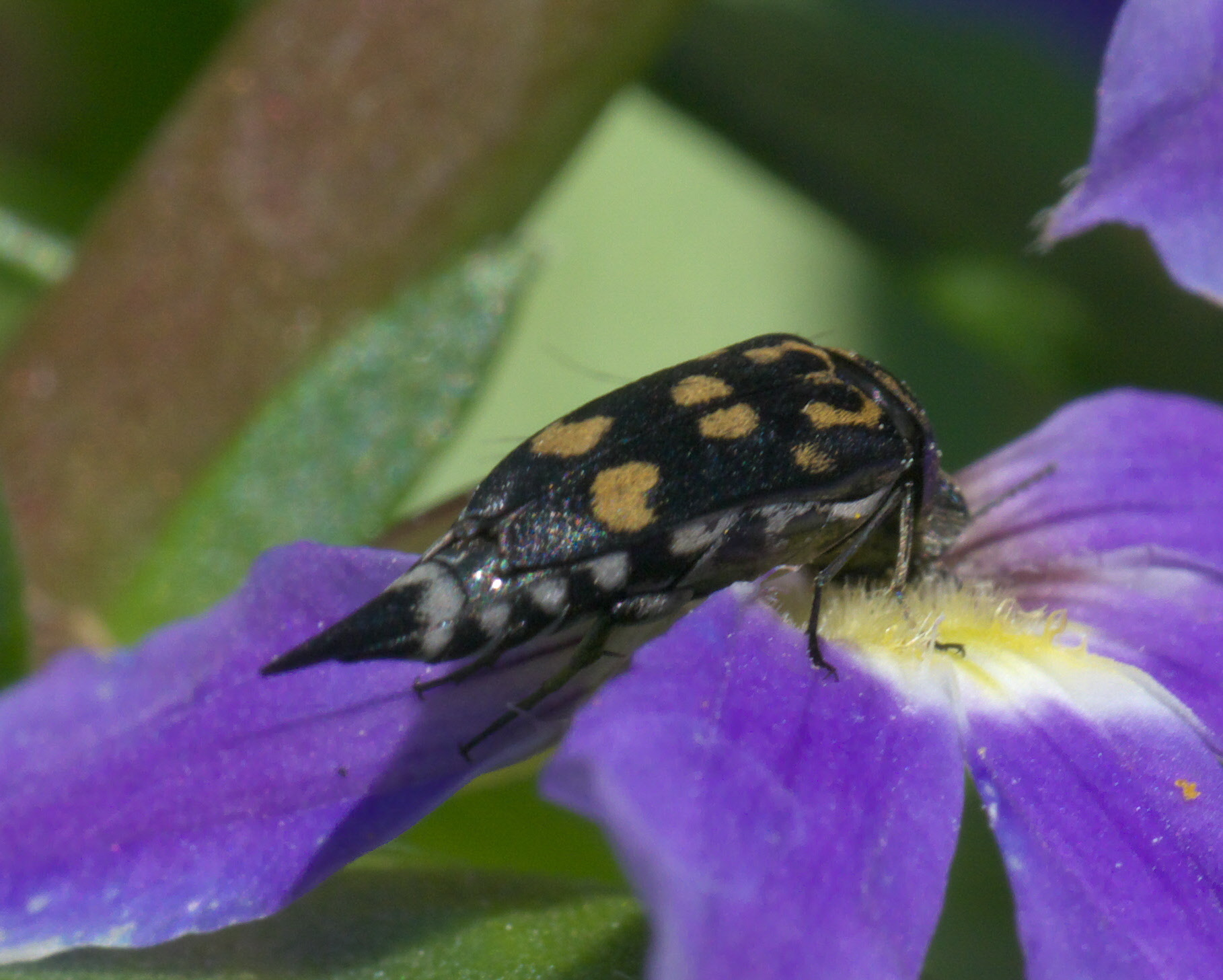
Hoshihananomia octopunctata

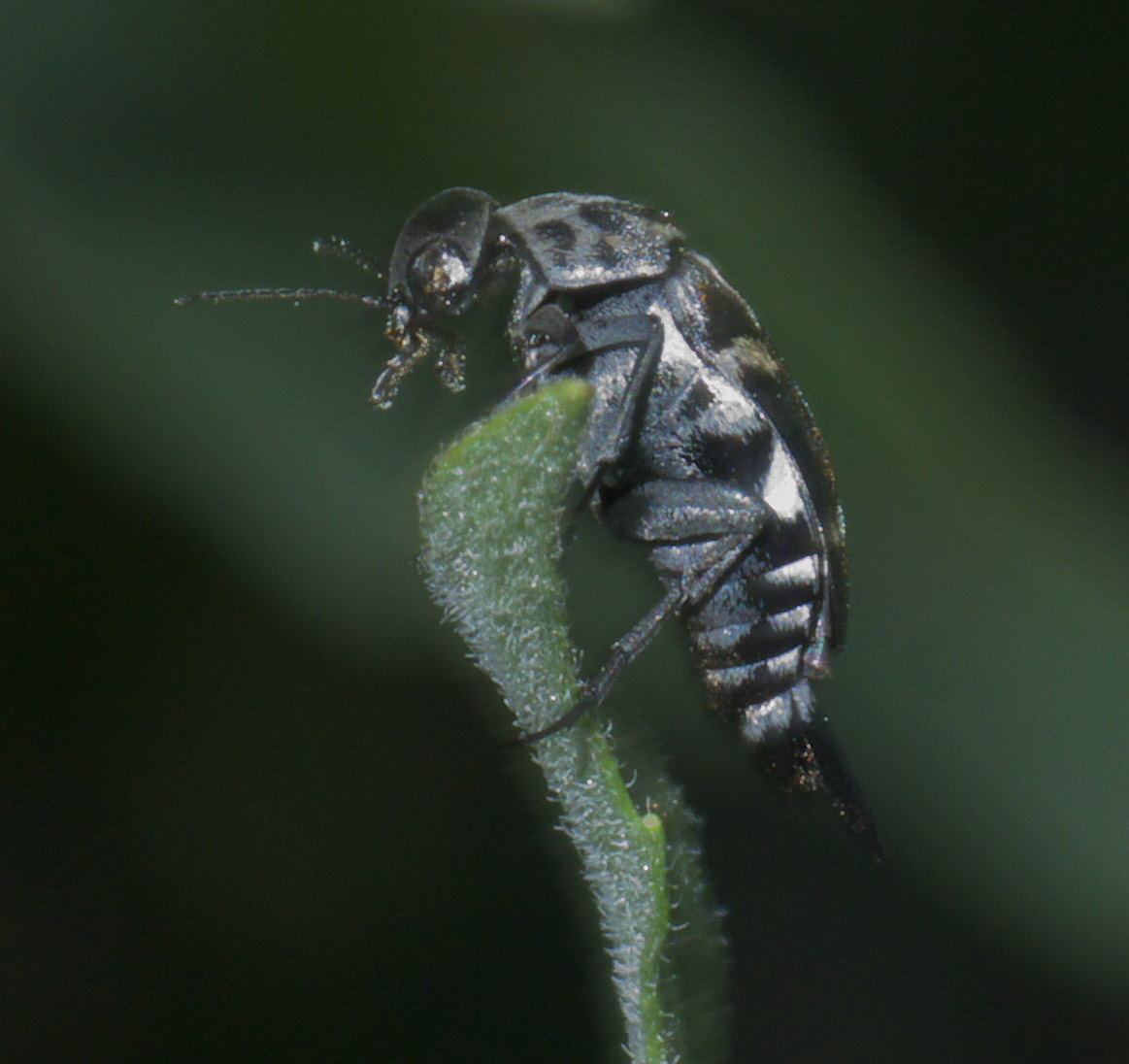
Hoshihananomia octopunctata

== Species ==
These 39 species belong to the genus Hoshihananomia:

- Hoshihananomia alboguttata (Solier, 1851)
- Hoshihananomia antarctica (White 1846)
- Hoshihananomia auromaculata
- Hoshihananomia chrysophora (Lea, 1917)
- Hoshihananomia composita (Walker, 1858)
- Hoshihananomia dumbrelli (Lea 1895)
- Hoshihananomia formosana Nakane & Normura, 1950
- Hoshihananomia gacognei (Mulsant, 1852)
- Hoshihananomia hananomi Kano, 1928
- Hoshihananomia inflammata (LeConte, 1862)
- Hoshihananomia katoi Nakane & Nomura, 1957
- Hoshihananomia kirai Nakane & Nomura, 1950
- Hoshihananomia kurosai Chûjô & Nakane, 1955
- Hoshihananomia kusuii Nomura, 1975
- Hoshihananomia leucosticta (Germar, 1848)
- Hoshihananomia maroniensis (Pic, 1924)
- Hoshihananomia masatakai Tsuru & Takakuwa, 2007
- Hoshihananomia michaelae Horák, 1986
- Hoshihananomia minuscula Nomura, 1967
- Hoshihananomia mitsuoi Nakane & Nomura, 1950
- Hoshihananomia multiguttata (Waterhouse, 1878)
- Hoshihananomia nakanei Takakuwa, 1986
- Hoshihananomia notabilis (McLeay, 1887)
- Hoshihananomia ochrothorax Nomura, 1975
- Hoshihananomia octodecimmaculata (Lea, 1895)
- Hoshihananomia octomaculata (McLeay, 1873)
- Hoshihananomia octopunctata (Fabricius, 1775) (eight-spotted tumbling flower beetle)
- Hoshihananomia olbrechtsi Ermisch, 1952
- Hoshihananomia oshimae Nomura, 1967
- Hoshihananomia perlata (Sulzer, 1776)
- Hoshihananomia perlineata (Fall, 1907)
- Hoshihananomia picta (Chevrolat, 1829)
- Hoshihananomia pirika Kôno, 1935
- Hoshihananomia pseudauromaculata Kiyoyama, 1993
- Hoshihananomia pseudoelegans Franciscolo, 1952
- Hoshihananomia quattuordecimmaculata (W.J. Macleay, 1872)
- Hoshihananomia transsylvanica Ermisch, 1977
- Hoshihananomia trichopalpis Nomura, 1975
- Hoshihananomia vitticollis (Lea, 1917)
