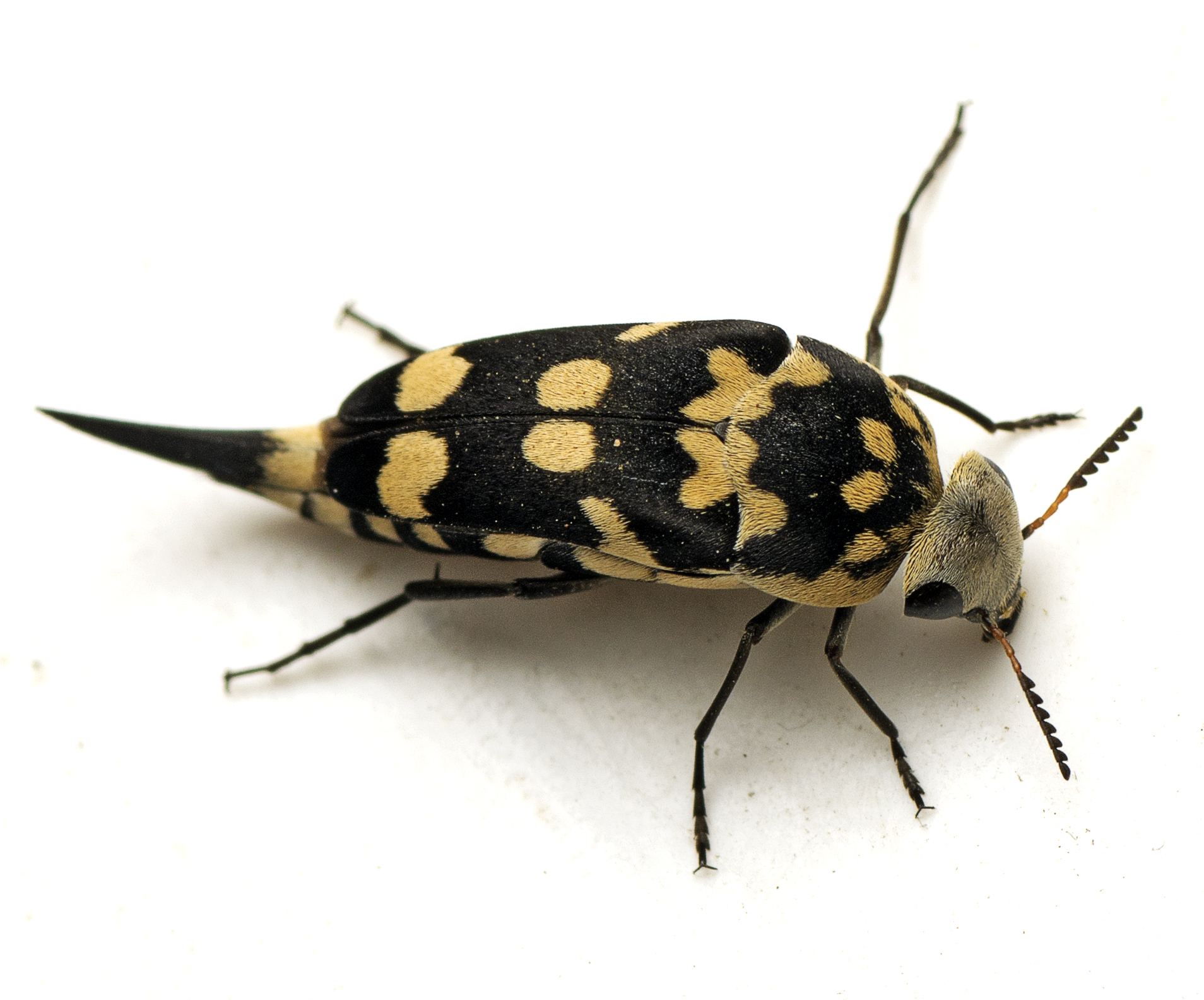
- Hoshihananomia leucosticta, Australia

Scientific classification
- Kingdom: Animalia
- Phylum: Arthropoda
- Clade: Pancrustacea
- Class: Insecta
- Order: Coleoptera
- Suborder: Polyphaga
- Infraorder: Cucujiformia
- Family: Mordellidae
- Subfamily: Mordellinae
- Tribe: Mordellini
- Genus: Hoshihananomia
- Species: H. leucosticta

Binomial name
- Hoshihananomia leucosticta (Germar, 1848)

Synonyms
- Mordella leucosticta Germar, 1848.; Mordella abdominalis Blessig, 1861

= Hoshihananomia leucosticta =

Species of beetles

Hoshihananomia leucosticta is a species of tumbling flower beetle in the family Mordellidae. It is found in Australia.
