= Friedrich Karl Wilhelm Dönitz =

German physician and entomologist (1838–1912)

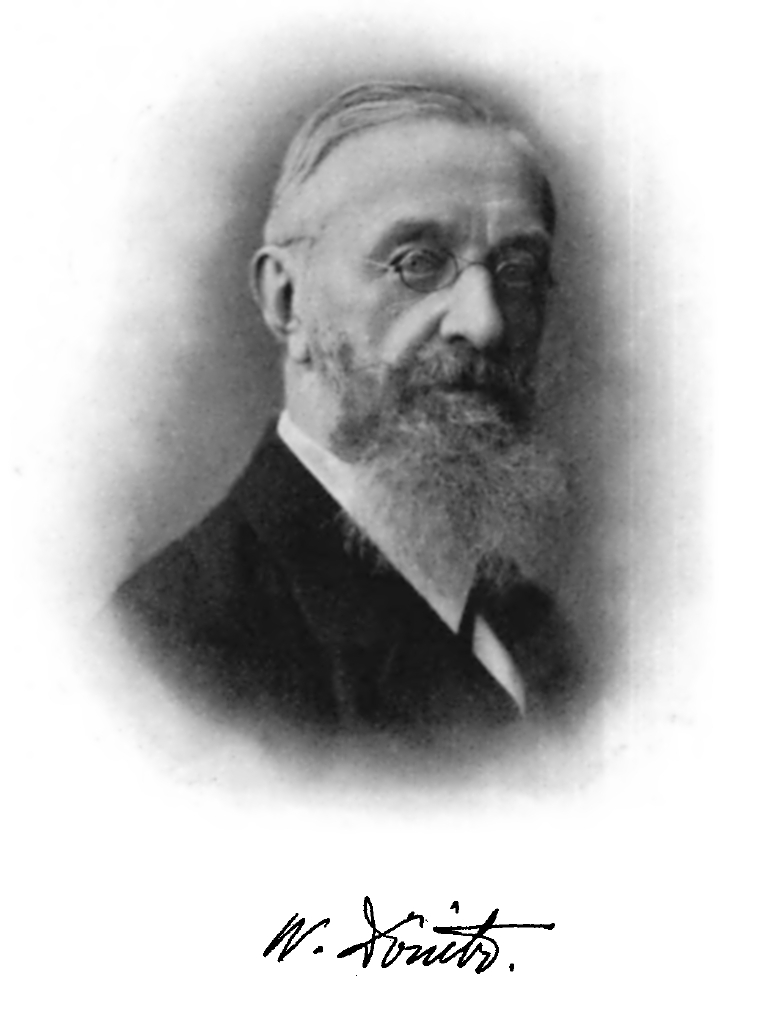
Portrait

Friedrich Karl Wilhelm Dönitz or Doenitz (27 June 1838 – 12 March 1912) was a German physician, anatomist, zoologist, and entomologist. He described numerous species of insects, ticks and worked for thirteen years in Japan where he was a professor of anatomy while also serving as the first forensic physician there.

Wilhelm was born to dressmaker Christoph and Caroline Dönitz and even as a young boy showed an interest in natural history and illustration. He studied medicine from 1859 to 1864 at the University of Berlin. He continued to work as a lecturer and researched on aspects of comparative zoology, anatomy and histology under Karl Bogislaus Reichert leading to being appointed Professor in 1873. He also worked with Friedrich Theodor von Frerichs. At the same time he was offered the Chair of Anatomy in Tokyo. He left Germany on 10 July 1873 for Japan after marrying Martha Schirmeister. In 1877 Japan was in a civil war and with the end of the Tokugawa dynasty, the new Meiji government was interested in German medicine especially to deal with matters of sanitation and public health. During vacations he studied Myriapoda, Arachnida (Arachnida) and Mollusca (Bivalvia) and collected these in Hakone, Odawara and Fuji. He produced all the illustrations accompanying his descriptions. In 1886 he returned to Berlin and worked with Robert Koch at the Hygiene Institute and later at the Institut für Infektionskrankheiten (Institute for Infectious Diseases) founded in 1891. He became director of the Bacteriology Laboratory at Bonn where he studied cholera. From 1896 he worked at the Institut for Serumforschung und Therapie at Steglitz under Paul Ehrlich. He then moved to become director of the Institute for Infectious Diseases where he acted as director during the years when Robert Koch was travelling.

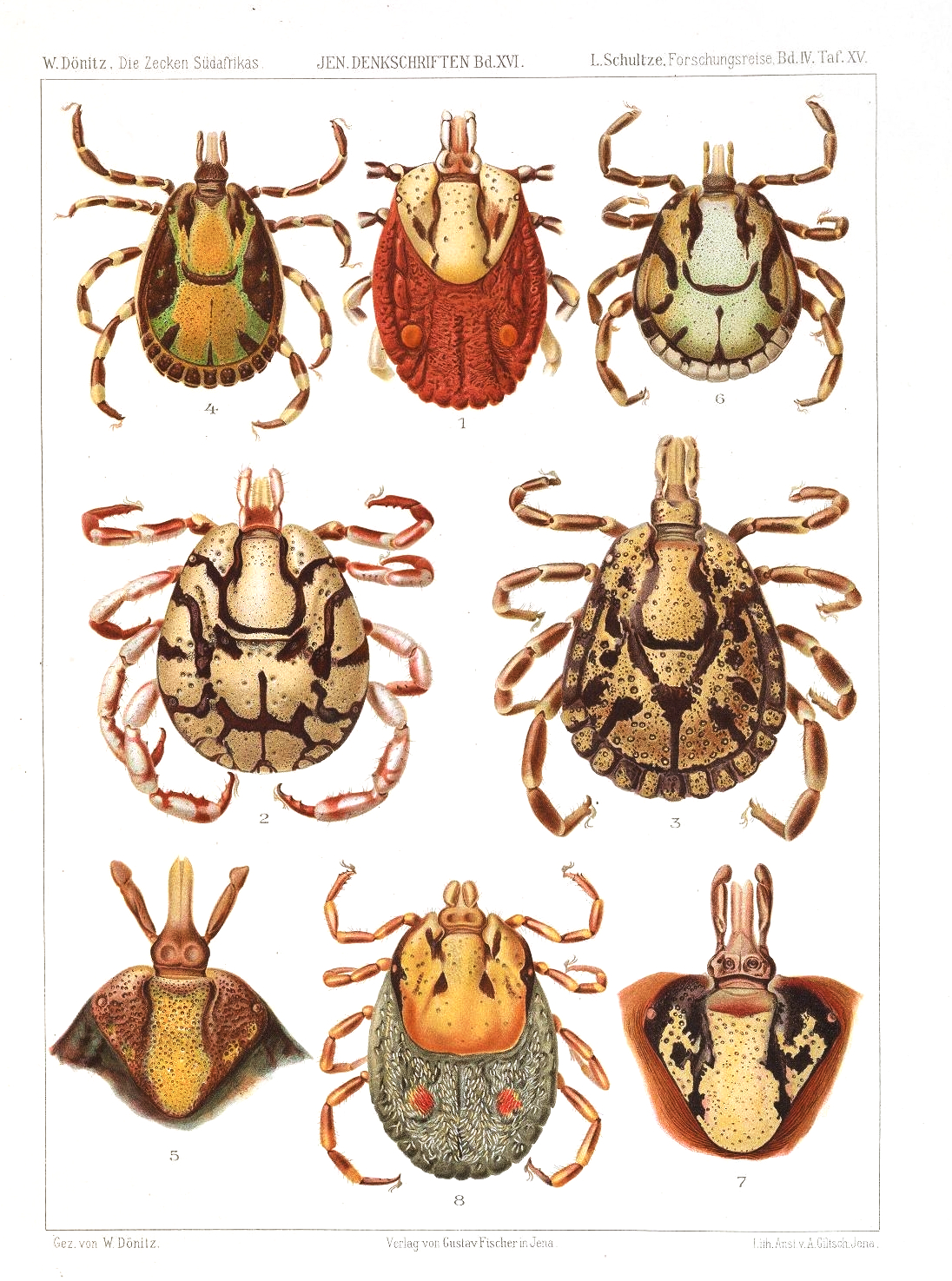
Ticks illustrated by Dönitz (1918)

He described several species of mosquitoes in the genus Anopheles and took an interest in the ticks. His collection of Palaearctic Lepidoptera is in the Museum für Naturkunde in Berlin while other collections are at the Naturmuseum Senckenberg in Frankfurt. A structure in the neck of Anhinga species is named after him as the "bridge of Dönitz". A sedge species Carex doenitzii was named after him by Böckeler.

He suffered from a disease of the intestine and died from infection after undergoing a surgery. He was survived by his wife, a son and a daughter. He was interred in the Invalids' Cemetery.

== Works ==
Partial list (for a complete list see the obituary by Nuttall)

- Abortion among the Japanese. In: Mitteilungen der deutschen Gesellschaft für Natur- und Völkerkunde Ostasiens 1873.
- Über die Lebensweise zweier Vogelspinnen aus Japan. Sitz.-ber. Ges. naturf. Freunde Berlin 1887: 8–10. (1887)
- Nachrichten aus dem Berliner Entomologischen Verein. Insekten-Börse 18:36–38 (1901)
- Beitrage zur Kenntniss der Anopheles. Z. Hyg. Infektkr. 41 15–88, 2 pls. (1902)

English Translation.

- Beitrage zur Kenntniss der Anopheles. II. Mittheilung. Z. hyg. Infektkr. 43:215–238, illus. (1903)
