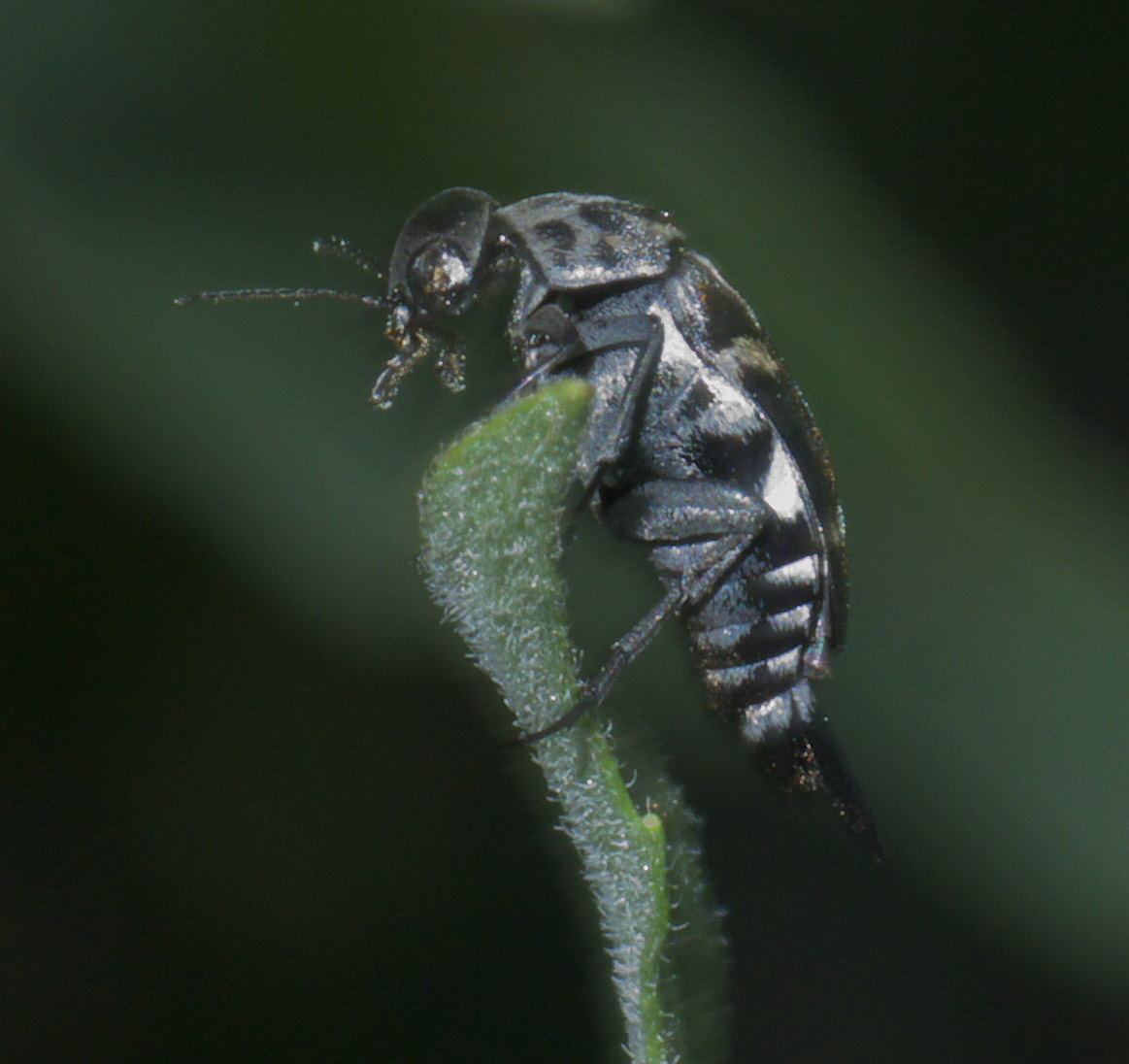

Scientific classification
- Domain: Eukaryota
- Kingdom: Animalia
- Phylum: Arthropoda
- Class: Insecta
- Order: Coleoptera
- Suborder: Polyphaga
- Infraorder: Cucujiformia
- Family: Mordellidae
- Genus: Hoshihananomia
- Species: H. octopunctata

Binomial name
- Hoshihananomia octopunctata authority = (Fabricius, 1775)

= Hoshihananomia octopunctata =

Species of beetle

Hoshihananomia octopunctata is a species of tumbling flower beetle in the family Mordellidae. It is found in North America.

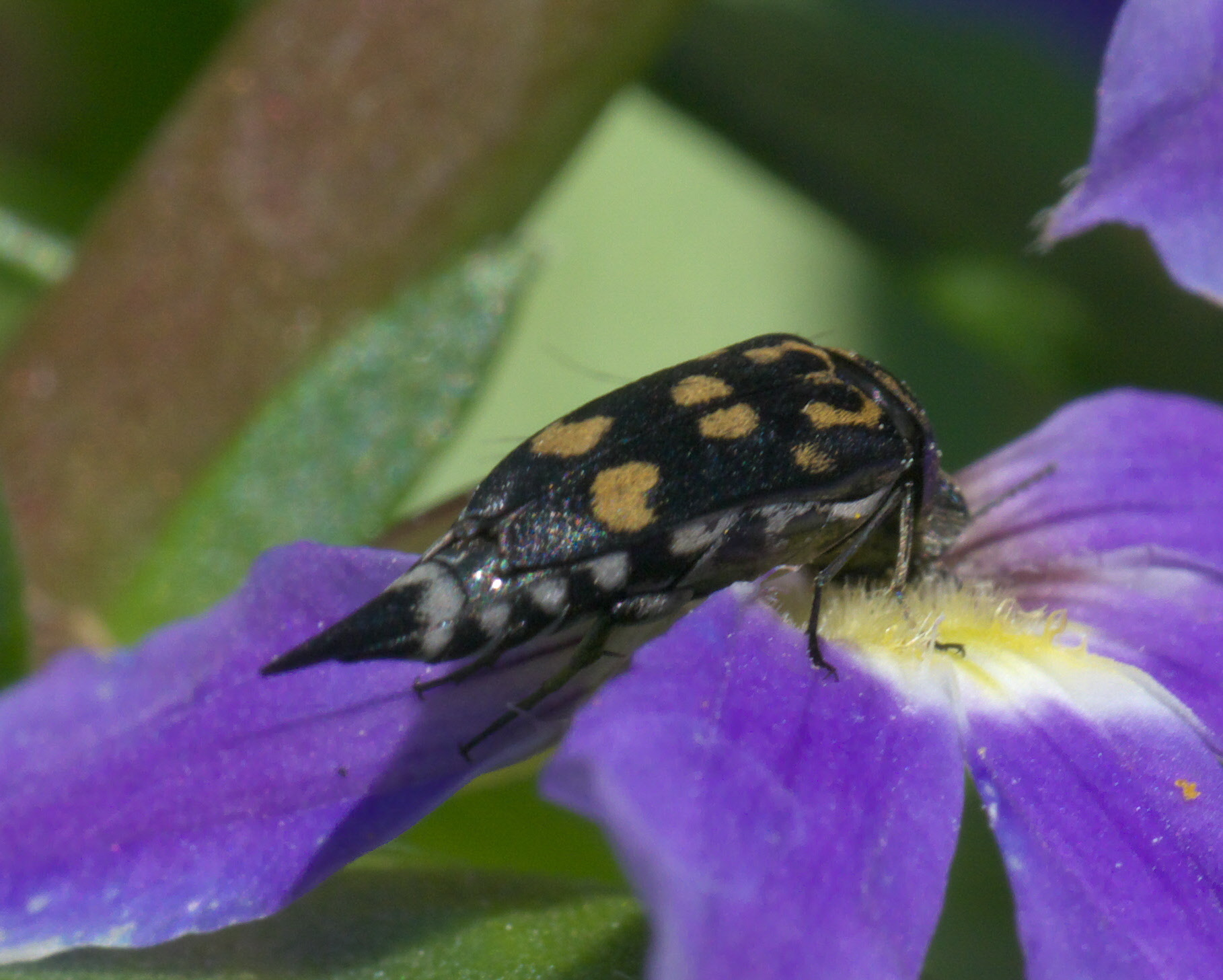
