= Hoshihananomia picta =

Scientific classification
- Kingdom: Animalia
- Phylum: Arthropoda
- Class: Insecta
- Order: Coleoptera
- Suborder: Polyphaga
- Infraorder: Cucujiformia
- Family: Mordellidae
- Subfamily: Mordellinae
- Tribe: Mordellini
- Genus: Hoshihananomia
- Species: H. picta

Binomial name
- Hoshihananomia picta (Chevrolat, 1829)

Synonyms
- Mordella picta Chevrolat, 1829

Species of beetles

Hoshihananomia picta is a species of tumbling flower beetle in the family Mordellidae, found in South America.
