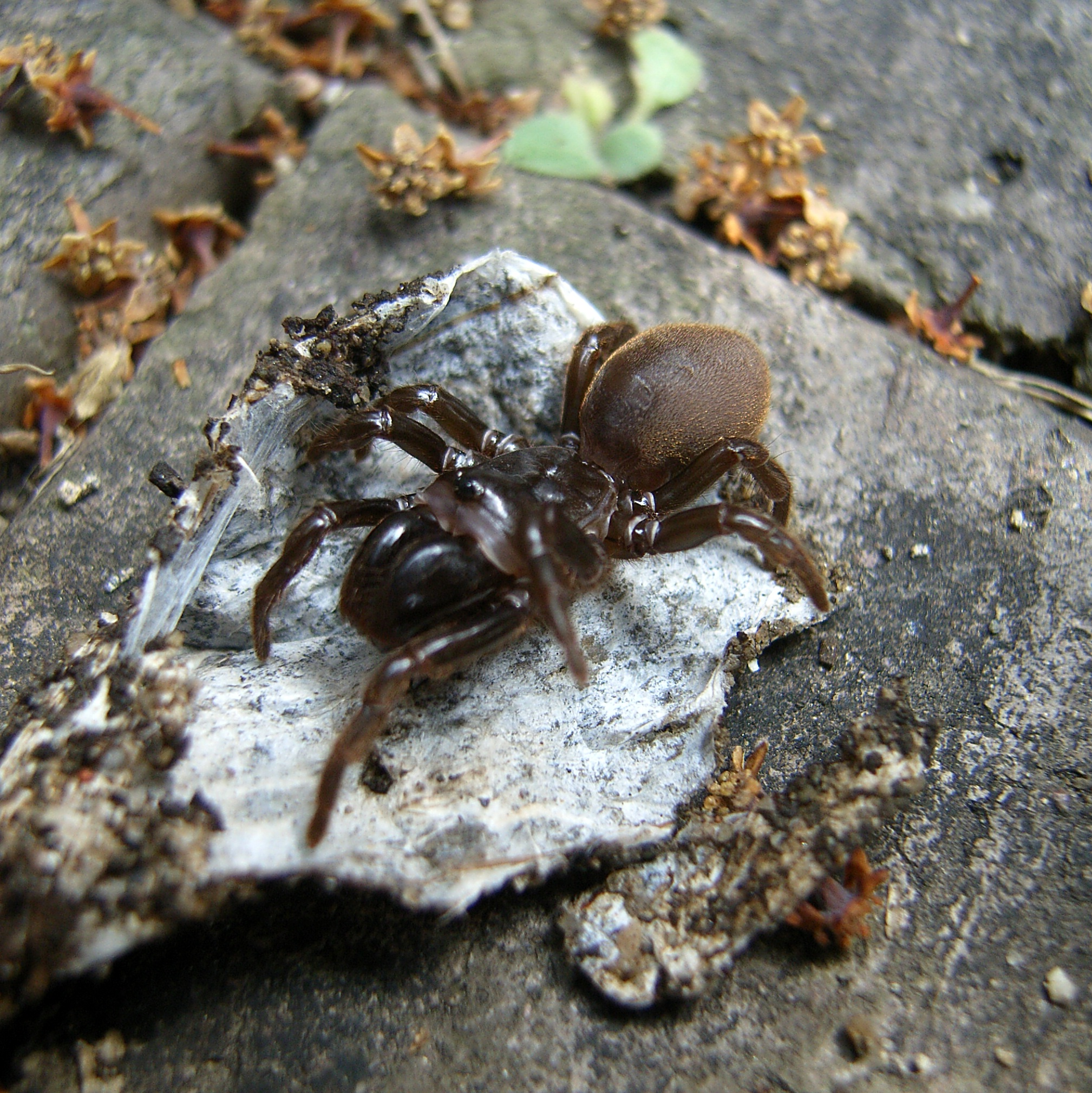

Scientific classification
- Kingdom: Animalia
- Phylum: Arthropoda
- Subphylum: Chelicerata
- Class: Arachnida
- Order: Araneae
- Infraorder: Mygalomorphae
- Family: Atypidae
- Genus: Atypus
- Species: A. karschi

Binomial name
- Atypus karschi Dönitz, 1887

Synonyms
- Atypus snetsingeri Sarno, 1973

= Atypus karschi =

Species of spider

Atypus karschi is a mygalomorph spider found in Korea, China, Taiwan, and Japan. It has been introduced into the United States. First described in 1887 by Friedrich Karl Wilhelm Dönitz, the specific name honors arachnologist Ferdinand Karsch.

== Distribution ==
Primarily found in Asia, there is also a population of A. karschi in southeastern Pennsylvania. This population was previously thought to be a separate species, but genetic testing revealed it to be the same species as A. karschi in Asia. Their habitat includes fields, trees, and slopes among wooded areas, suburban areas, and riparian zones.

== Description ==
These spiders are black or dark brown and range from 17 to 20 mm (0.67 to 0.79 in). They have large chelicerae in comparison to their body size, which point downwards as characteristic of mygalomorphs.

== Behavior ==
A. karschi spiders create an unusual web. The spider creates a vertical or horizontal tube of silk, part of which is hidden below ground, and with the portion above ground covered in leaves and other debris. The spider hunts by waiting for an insect to land or crawl onto the tube, then bites through the silk to pull the insect inside. Males leave their tubes once they reach maturity and wander in search for a mate, while females usually spend their whole lives within their burrows. The spiders use projectile excretion to safely defacate from within their tube, and some researchers suspect that the spider uses their excretion to create a V shape on the ground and funnel prey towards the tube. Young spiderlings traverse via ballooning, something that is rare among mygalomorph spiders.
