= Hoshihananomia maroniensis =

Scientific classification
- Kingdom: Animalia
- Phylum: Arthropoda
- Class: Insecta
- Order: Coleoptera
- Suborder: Polyphaga
- Infraorder: Cucujiformia
- Family: Mordellidae
- Subfamily: Mordellinae
- Tribe: Mordellini
- Genus: Hoshihananomia
- Species: H. maroniensis

Binomial name
- Hoshihananomia maroniensis (Pic, 1924)

Synonyms
- Mordella maroniensis Pic, 1924

Species of beetles

Hoshihananomia maroniensis is a species of tumbling flower beetle in the family Mordellidae, known from French Guiana.
