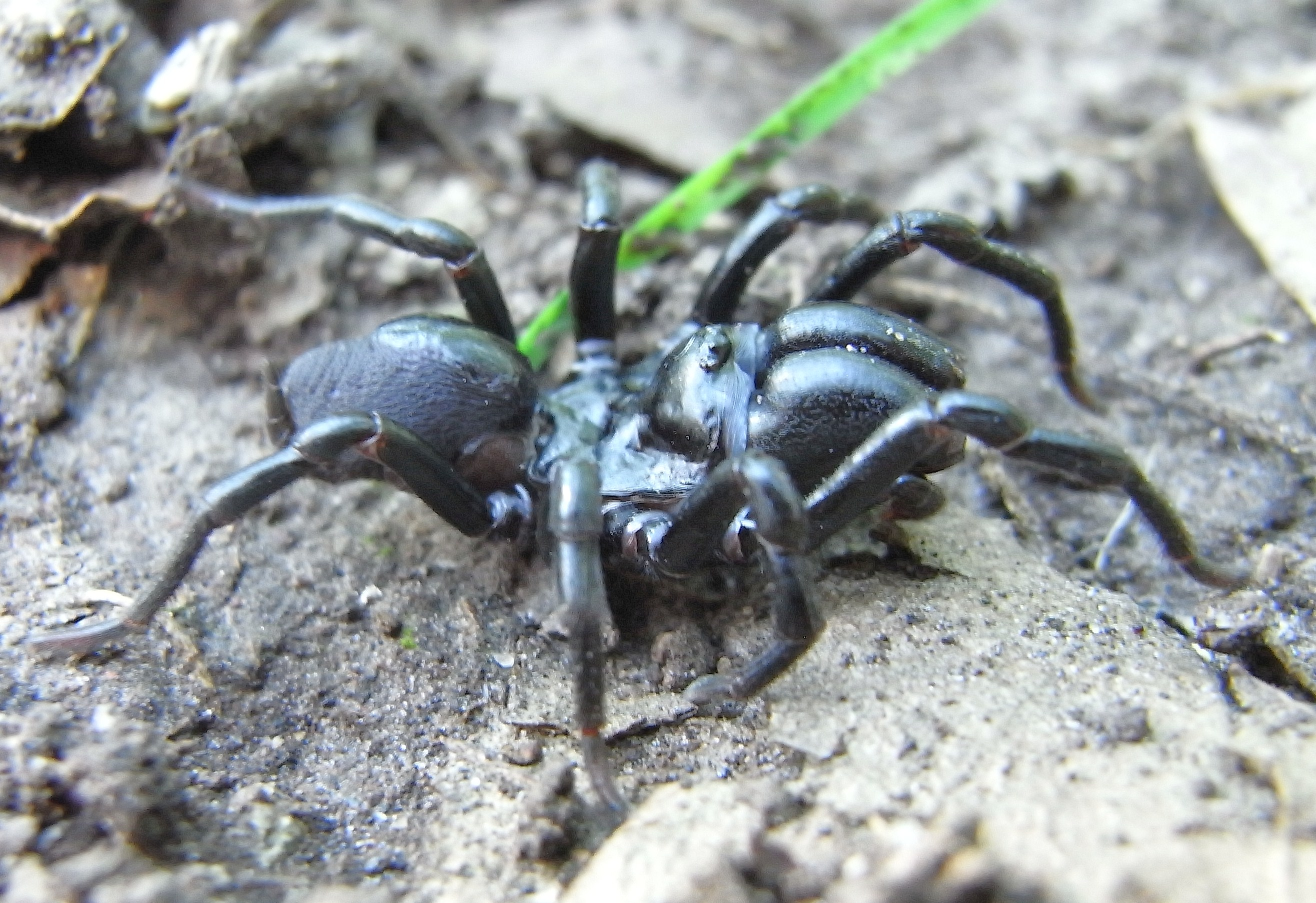

Scientific classification
- Domain: Eukaryota
- Kingdom: Animalia
- Phylum: Arthropoda
- Subphylum: Chelicerata
- Class: Arachnida
- Order: Araneae
- Infraorder: Mygalomorphae
- Family: Atypidae
- Genus: Atypus
- Species: A. piceus

Binomial name
- Atypus piceus (Sulzer, 1776)

Synonyms
- Aranea picea Sulzer, 1776; Aranea subterranea Roemer, 1789; Atypus beckii O. Pickard-Cambridge, 1875; Atypus piceus (Sulzer, 1776); Atypus sulzeri Latreille, 1806; Oletera atypa (Walckenaer, 1805); Oletera atypus Walckenaer, 1805; Oletera picea (Sulzer, 1776); Oletera piceus (Sulzer, 1776); Proatypus thaleri Braun, 1963

= Atypus piceus =

Species of spider

Atypus piceus is a mygalomorph spider of the family Atypidae. It occurs from France to Russia and in Iran, and is the type species of the genus Atypus.

== Description ==
Males are about 10 mm (0.39 in) long without chelicerae, females up to 15 mm (0.59 in). Males are of a deep black, while spiderlings and females are dark brown with a violet hue. The very long posterior spinnerets consist of three segments, the last segment features a light blot, which is helpful in identifying the species. A. piceus can live for more than 10 years.

== Habits ==
Adults live in up to 30 centimetres (12 in) deep tubes with a diameter of about 10 mm. The silken lining continues above ground for about 10 centimetres (3.9 in), where it is camouflaged with matter from the vicinity. The mating period is from June to July, when the males search for females. The spiderlings hatch during autumn and overwinter in the mother's burrow without feeding. After emerging in spring, they climb nearby plants and use strands of silk to fly away (ballooning).

== Evolutionary relationship ==
Atypus piceus is possibly the result of hybridisation of A. affinis and A. muralis. A. muralis has posterior spinnerets with four segments, A. affinis with three, and A. piceus has three, but the white blot could be result of this hybridisation.
