= Hoshihananomia dumbrelli =

Scientific classification
- Domain: Eukaryota
- Kingdom: Animalia
- Phylum: Arthropoda
- Class: Insecta
- Order: Coleoptera
- Suborder: Polyphaga
- Infraorder: Cucujiformia
- Family: Mordellidae
- Subfamily: Mordellinae
- Tribe: Mordellini
- Genus: Hoshihananomia
- Species: H. dumbrelli

Binomial name
- Hoshihananomia dumbrelli (Lea, 1895)

Synonyms
- Mordella dumbrelli Lea, 1895

Species of beetle

Hoshihananomia dumbrelli is a species of tumbling flower beetle of the family Mordellidae. It was discovered in 1895.
