= Hoshihananomia inflammata =

Scientific classification
- Domain: Eukaryota
- Kingdom: Animalia
- Phylum: Arthropoda
- Class: Insecta
- Order: Coleoptera
- Suborder: Polyphaga
- Infraorder: Cucujiformia
- Family: Mordellidae
- Genus: Hoshihananomia
- Species: H. inflammata

Binomial name
- Hoshihananomia inflammata (LeConte, 1862)

Species of beetle

Hoshihananomia inflammata is a species of tumbling flower beetle in the family Mordellidae. It is found in North America. Larvae and pupae can be found in rotting oak wood.
