= Hoshihananomia pseudauromaculata =

Scientific classification
- Domain: Eukaryota
- Kingdom: Animalia
- Phylum: Arthropoda
- Class: Insecta
- Order: Coleoptera
- Suborder: Polyphaga
- Infraorder: Cucujiformia
- Family: Mordellidae
- Genus: Hoshihananomia
- Species: H. pseudauromaculata

Binomial name
- Hoshihananomia pseudauromaculata Kiyoyama, 1993

Species of beetle

Hoshihananomia pseudauromaculata is a species of beetle in the genus Hoshihananomia of the family Mordellidae, which is part of the superfamily Tenebrionoidea. It was discovered in 1993.
