= Sphodros paisano =

Scientific classification
- Kingdom: Animalia
- Phylum: Arthropoda
- Subphylum: Chelicerata
- Class: Arachnida
- Order: Araneae
- Infraorder: Mygalomorphae
- Family: Atypidae
- Genus: Sphodros
- Species: S. paisano

Binomial name
- Sphodros paisano Gertsch & Platnick, 1980

Species of spider

Sphodros paisano is a species of purseweb spider in the family Atypidae. It is found in the United States and Mexico.
