= Hoshihananomia olbrechtsi =

Scientific classification
- Domain: Eukaryota
- Kingdom: Animalia
- Phylum: Arthropoda
- Class: Insecta
- Order: Coleoptera
- Suborder: Polyphaga
- Infraorder: Cucujiformia
- Family: Mordellidae
- Genus: Hoshihananomia
- Species: H. olbrechtsi

Binomial name
- Hoshihananomia olbrechtsi Ermisch, 1952

Species of beetle

Hoshihananomia olbrechtsi is a species of beetle in the genus Hoshihananomia of the family Mordellidae, which is part of the superfamily Tenebrionoidea. It was discovered in 1952.
