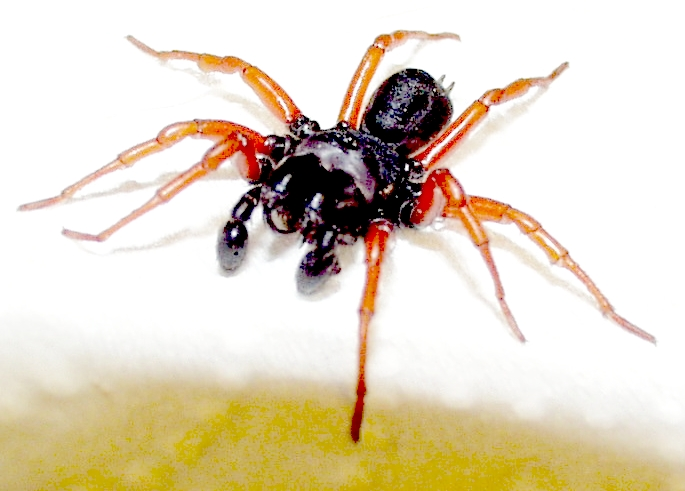
- S. rufipes

Scientific classification
- Domain: Eukaryota
- Kingdom: Animalia
- Phylum: Arthropoda
- Subphylum: Chelicerata
- Class: Arachnida
- Order: Araneae
- Infraorder: Mygalomorphae
- Family: Atypidae
- Genus: Sphodros; Walckenaer, 1835

Type species
- S. abboti Walckenaer, 1835

Species
- 7, see text

= Sphodros =

Genus of spiders

Sphodros is a genus of North American purseweb spiders first described by Charles Athanase Walckenaer in 1835. It was considered a synonym of Atypus until 1980.

== Species ==
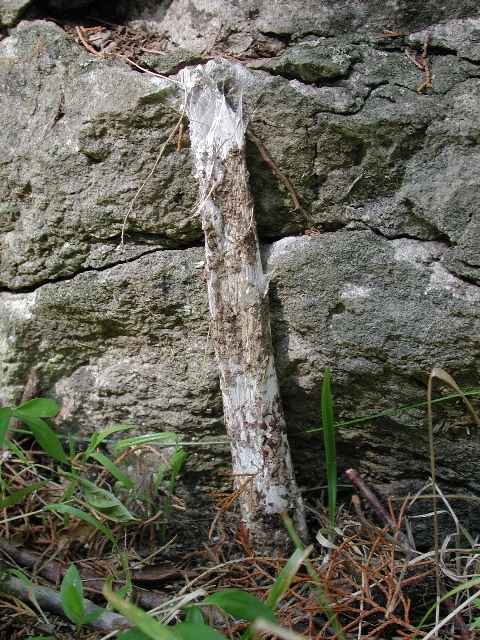
Tube of a Sphodros species

As of April 2019 it contains seven species in the United States, Canada, and Mexico:

- Sphodros abboti Walckenaer, 1835 (type) – Southern Georgia, Northern Florida
- Sphodros atlanticus Gertsch & Platnick, 1980 – Eastern and Central United States
- Sphodros coylei Gertsch & Platnick, 1980 – South Carolina, Virginia
- Sphodros fitchi Gertsch & Platnick, 1980 – Nebraska, Kansas, Oklahoma, Arkansas, Iowa
- Sphodros niger (Hentz, 1842) – Canada, Northeastern United States (south to Tennessee and east to Kansas)
- Sphodros paisano Gertsch & Platnick, 1980 – Southeastern Texas, Mexico
- Sphodros rufipes (Latreille, 1829) – Southeastern United States (east from Texas)
