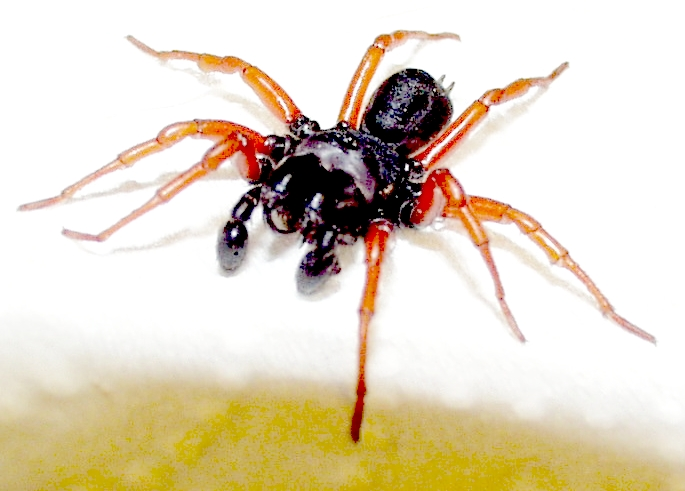
- Male S. rufipes

Scientific classification
- Kingdom: Animalia
- Phylum: Arthropoda
- Subphylum: Chelicerata
- Class: Arachnida
- Order: Araneae
- Infraorder: Mygalomorphae
- Family: Atypidae
- Genus: Sphodros
- Species: S. rufipes

Binomial name
- Sphodros rufipes (Latreille, 1829)

Synonyms
- Atypus bicolor Lucas, 1836; Atypus milberti (Walckenaer, 1837); Atypus rufipes Latreille, 1829; Oletera bicolor (Lucas, 1836); Sphodros milberti Walckenaer, 1837; Sphodros rufipes (Latreille, 1829)

= Sphodros rufipes =

Red legged purseweb spider from the United States

Sphodros rufipes, sometimes called the red legged purseweb spider, is a mygalomorph spider from the southern and eastern United States, though it has been photographed as far north as Minnesota. It has confirmed sightings in Indiana, Missouri, New Jersey, West Virginia, Tennessee, Delaware, Louisiana, and Tuckernuck Island in Massachusetts. One recent sighting shows that these spiders can also be found in Canada, while another reveals that they have been spotted in Kansas.

The species name rufipes is Latin for 'red foot'.

== Taxonomy ==
The species was first described as Atypus rufipes by Pierre André Latreille in 1829. It was transferred to the genus Sphodros in 1980. Sphodros and Atypus species can be distinguished by features of their genitalia. Sphodros males have a long, curved embolus lying in a similarly shaped conductor. Females have an epigynum with four long, coiled tubes.

== Description ==
These spiders are solid and strong-looking with reddish-brown to black bodies. The males have distinctive long red or red-orange legs from the femora downwards. The females have legs the same color as the body. Females are known to reach a body length of about 25 mm, or just under an inch, including the chelicerae. Males are smaller with a body length of about 15 mm. In males, the fourth pair of legs is longest at about 15 mm; in females, the first pair of legs is longest, at about 15.5 mm. Like other spiders in the infraorder Mygalomorphae, they have fangs that point straight down rather than crossing.

== Behavior ==
This species has a distinctive method of catching prey. By spinning a tunnel of silk against the side of a tree or other convenient objects, they funnel their prey into a narrow passage that makes escaping difficult once inside. In their silk tunnel, they wait for their prey to land or climb on the side of the tunnel at which point the spider will bite through the silk walls and pull the prey inside.

Because they rely so heavily on their webs for food and shelter, these spiders rarely leave for any reason other than mating. Like other purseweb spiders, when ready to mate, the males will leave their webs to search for the females who spend time building up their nests in preparation for laying and protecting their eggs.

These "primitive" spiders are known for their long lifespan, with females having been recorded living up to 7 years of age. Because of their longer lives, their young can take upwards of a year to fully mature and leave their mother's webs.

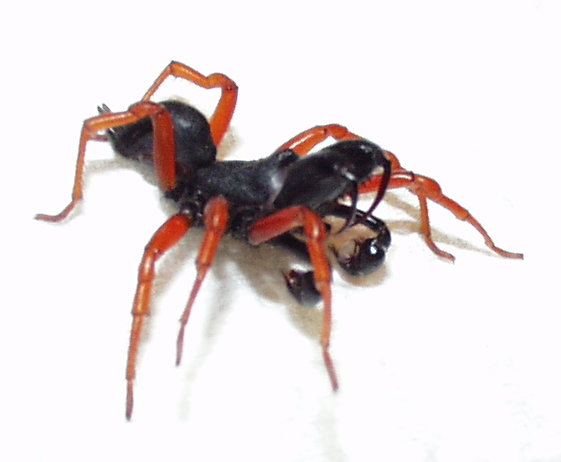
A male Sphodros rufipes, showing its large vertical fangs in a threat display

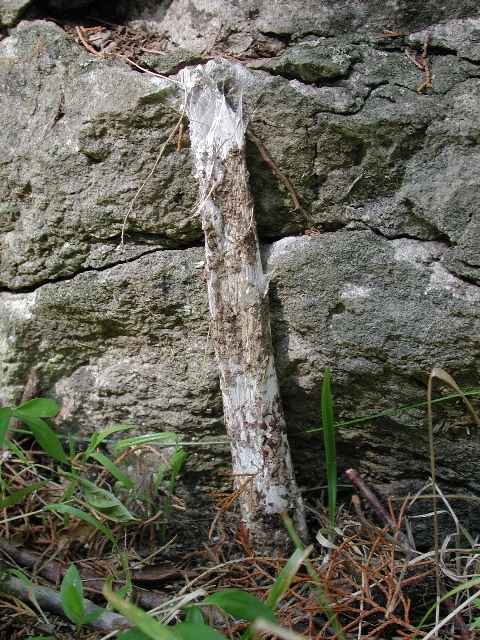
Sphodros species tube
