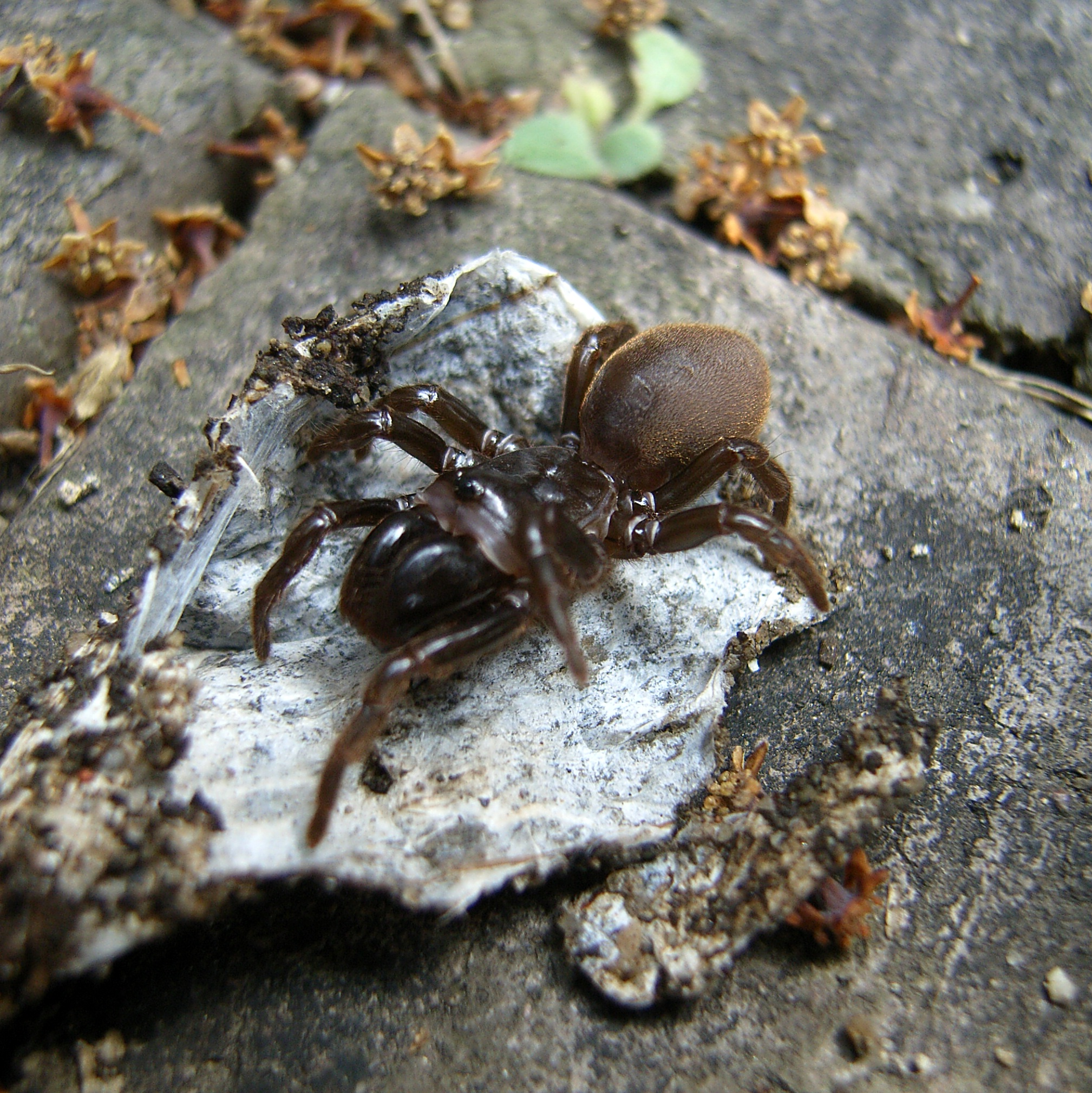
- A. karschi
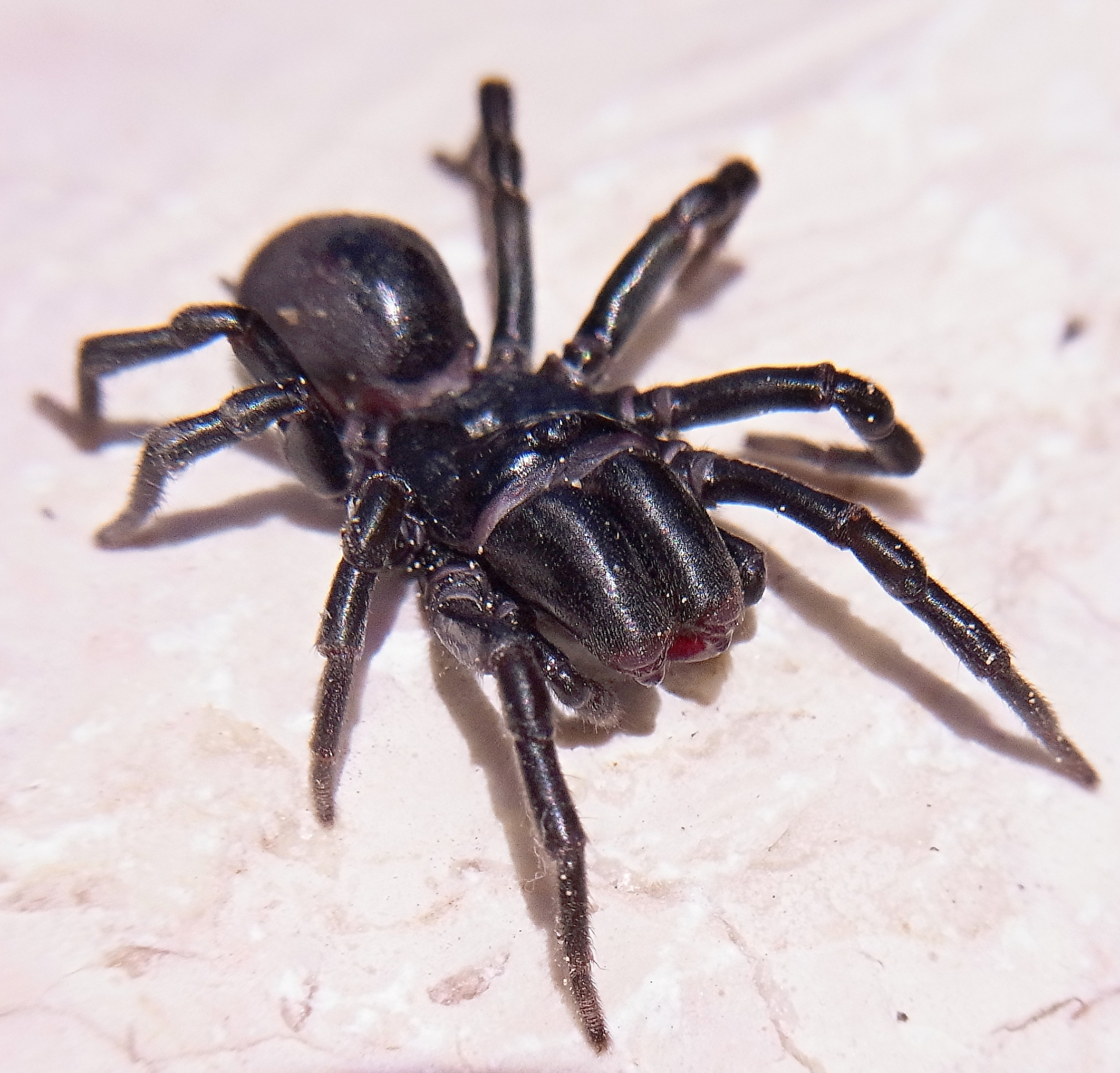
- Atypus affinis

Scientific classification
- Kingdom: Animalia
- Phylum: Arthropoda
- Subphylum: Chelicerata
- Class: Arachnida
- Order: Araneae
- Infraorder: Mygalomorphae
- Family: Atypidae
- Genus: Atypus; Latreille, 1804

Type species
- A. piceus (Sulzer, 1776)

Species
- 38, see text

Synonyms
- Proatypus Miller, 1947

= Atypus =

Atypus Temporal range: Palaeogene–present

Genus of spiders

Atypus, also called purseweb spiders, is a genus of atypical tarantulas first described by Pierre André Latreille in 1804. It occurs in Eurasia, with one species (A. affinis) reaching into North Africa. Only three of the described species occur in Europe: A. piceus, A. affinis, and A. muralis. Specimens from the USA formerly known as A. snetsingeri represent an introduced population of A. karschi.

== Identification features ==
They are three-clawed, medium to large spiders with eight eyes. They have six spinnerets with the median spinneret truncated. The prolateral sides of the maxillae are elongated. The cephalic side of the cephalothorax is elevated. They have large chelicerae with long and thin fangs. The male sternum has marginal ridges.

== Medical usage ==
The cobwebs produced by spiders in the genus Atypus, called Huidouba, have traditionally been consumed in Sichuan and Tibet to manage the symptoms of diabetes. Several studies have corroborated their therapeutic effects.

Peasants in the southern Carpathian Mountains used to cut up tubes built by Atypus and cover wounds with the inner lining. It reportedly facilitated healing and even connected with the skin. This is believed to be due to antiseptic properties of spider silk (which is made of protein). Atypus cobwebs have also been used in Sichuan and Tibet to manage the symptoms of diabetes.

== Species ==
As of October 2025, this genus includes 38 species:

- Atypus affinis Eichwald, 1830 – Europe (Britain and Portugal to Ukraine), North Africa
- Atypus baotianmanensis Hu, 1994 – China
- Atypus baotingensis F. Li, Xu, Z. T. Zhang, Liu, H. L. Zhang & D. Q. Li, 2018 – China (Hainan)
- Atypus coreanus Kim, 1985 – Korea
- Atypus dawei Y. X. Li & Xu, 2025 – China
- Atypus dorsualis Thorell, 1897 – Myanmar, Thailand
- Atypus flexus Zhu, Zhang, Song & Qu, 2006 – China
- Atypus formosensis Kishida, 1943 – Taiwan
- Atypus heterothecus Zhang, 1985 – China
- Atypus javanus Thorell, 1890 – Indonesia (Java)
- Atypus jianfengensis F. Li, Xu, Z. T. Zhang, Liu, H. L. Zhang & D. Q. Li, 2018 – China (Hainan)
- Atypus karschi Dönitz, 1887 – Korea, China, Taiwan, Japan. Introduced to United States
- Atypus lannaianus Schwendinger, 1989 – Thailand
- Atypus largosaccatus Zhu, Zhang, Song & Qu, 2006 – China
- Atypus ledongensis Zhu, Zhang, Song & Qu, 2006 – China
- Atypus liui Y. X. Li & Xu, 2025 – China
- Atypus magnus Namkung, 1986 – Russia (Far East), Korea
- Atypus medius Oliger, 1999 – Russia (Far East)
- Atypus minutus S. Y. Lee, J. H. Lee, Yoo & Kim, 2015 – Korea
- Atypus muralis Bertkau, 1890 – Central Europe to Turkmenistan
- Atypus pedicellatus Zhu, Zhang, Song & Qu, 2006 – China
- Atypus piceus (Sulzer, 1776) – Europe (France to Russia), Iran (type species)
- Atypus quelpartensis Namkung, 2002 – Korea
- Atypus sacculatus Zhu, Zhang, Song & Qu, 2006 – China
- Atypus seogwipoensis Kim, Ye & Noh, 2015 – Korea
- Atypus sinensis Schenkel, 1953 – China
- Atypus siyiensis Wu, Liu, Huang, Yin & Xu, 2025 – China
- Atypus sternosulcus Kim, Kim, Jung & Lee, 2006 – Korea
- Atypus suiningensis Zhang, 1985 – China
- Atypus suthepicus Schwendinger, 1989 – Thailand
- Atypus sutherlandi Chennappaiya, 1935 – India
- Atypus suwonensis Kim, Kim, Jung & Lee, 2006 – Korea
- Atypus tibetensis Zhu, Zhang, Song & Qu, 2006 – China
- Atypus wataribabaorum Tanikawa, 2006 – Japan
- Atypus wii Siliwal, Kumar & Raven, 2014 – India
- Atypus yajuni Zhu, Zhang, Song & Qu, 2006 – China
- Atypus yanjingensis Wu, Liu, Huang, Yin & Xu, 2025 – China
- Atypus yaozu Wu, Liu, Huang, Yin & Xu, 2025 – China
