= Streptomyces niger =

Scientific classification
- Domain: Bacteria
- Kingdom: Bacillati
- Phylum: Actinomycetota
- Class: Actinomycetes
- Order: Streptomycetales
- Family: Streptomycetaceae
- Genus: Streptomyces
- Species: S. niger

Binomial name
- Streptomyces niger Goodfellow et al. 1986

Type strain
- ATCC 17756, BCRC 11877, CBS 230.65, CBS 663.72, CCRC 11877, CGMCC 4.1748, CMI 112 787, CMI 112787, DSM 40302, DSM 43049, HACC 146, IFO 13362, IFO 13902, ISP 5302, JCM 3158, KCC 3158, KCC A-0158, NBIMCC 495, NBRC 13362, NBRC 13902, NCIB 10992, NCIMB 10992, NRRL B-3857, NRRL-ISP 5302, PCM 2305, RIA 1323, VKM Ac-1736

Synonyms
- Chainia nigra

Species of bacterium

Streptomyces niger is a bacterium species from the genus of Streptomyces. Streptomyces niger produces streptomycin.

== See also ==
- List of Streptomyces species
