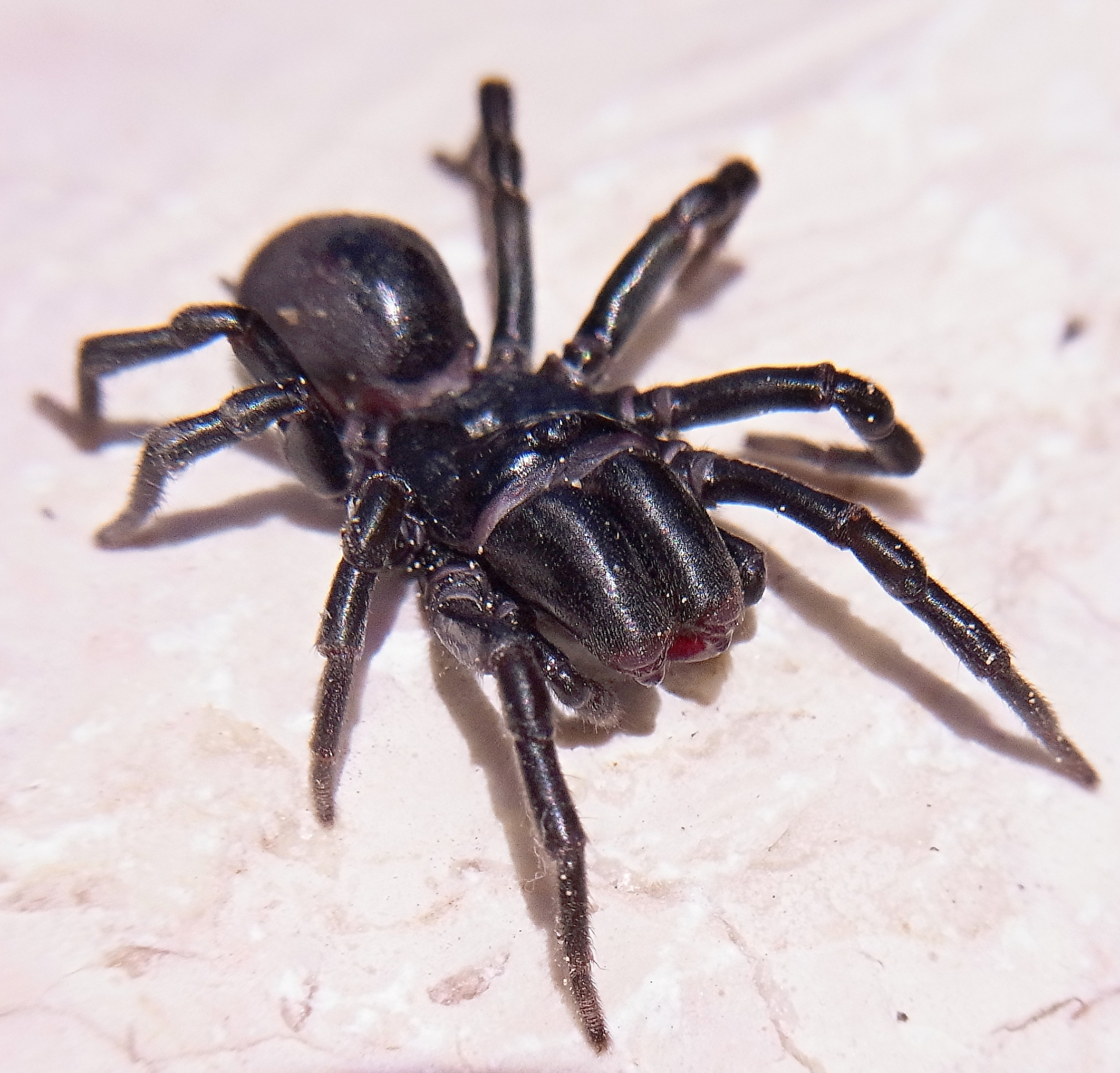

Scientific classification
- Domain: Eukaryota
- Kingdom: Animalia
- Phylum: Arthropoda
- Subphylum: Chelicerata
- Class: Arachnida
- Order: Araneae
- Infraorder: Mygalomorphae
- Family: Atypidae
- Genus: Atypus
- Species: A. affinis

Binomial name
- Atypus affinis Eichwald, 1830
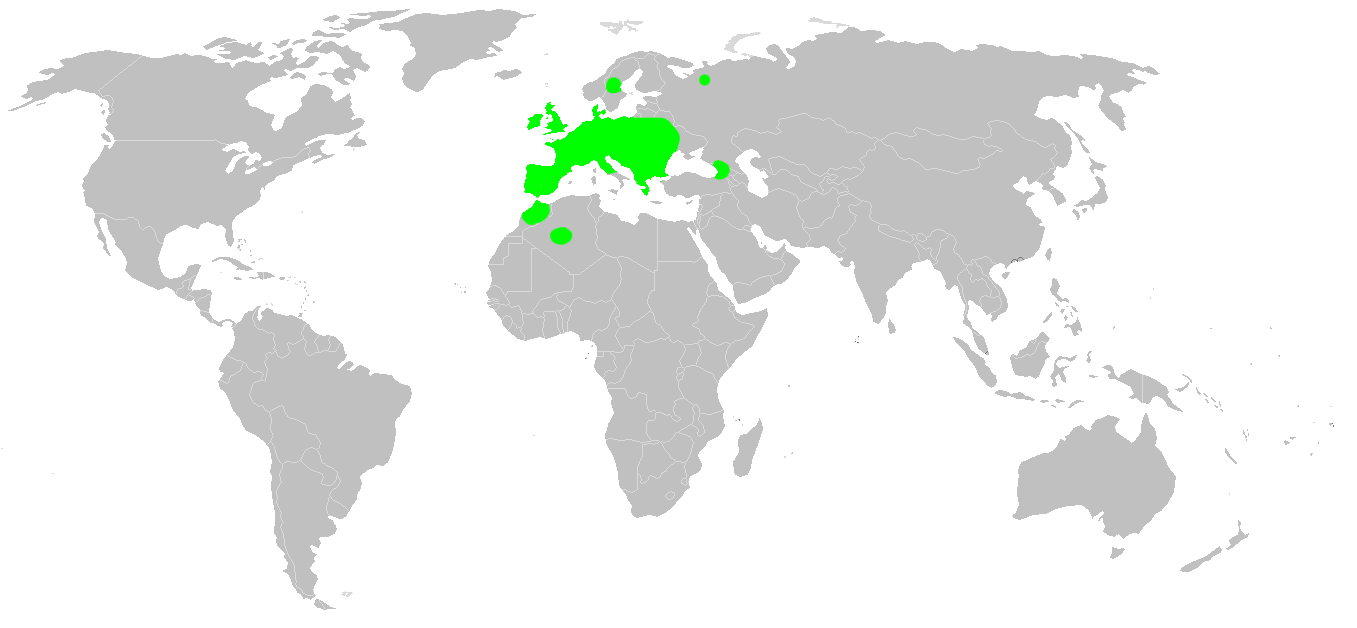

Synonyms
- Oletera atypus Oletera atypa Atypus anachoreta Atypus blackwalli Atypus bleodonticus Atypus coriaceus Atypus cedrorum

= Atypus affinis =

Species of spider

Atypus affinis, the purseweb spider, is a mygalomorph spider from Europe and North Africa.

== Distribution ==
A. affinis is found throughout much of the European mainland, in Great Britain and in North Africa, where this fossorial spider typically inhabit dry heathland, open pine forest, meadows, grassland and the base of rocky outcrops. It is the only mygalomorph spider in the Nordics and the United Kingdom, but this species, which prefers relatively warm temperatures, is uncommon and localised in both those regions at the northern edge of its range. In the Nordics, it is only found on south-facing slopes in the southern part, where it is highly local but fairly widespread in Denmark and highly local in southern Sweden (Blekinge and Scania). In the United Kingdom, where the species is local and has declined, most records are from southern England, but it also ranges into Wales and north to far southwestern Scotland. It was formerly listed for Ireland, which was based on the find of a single tubular webbing of the species in 1896, but today this is considered most likely to be from a plant nursery import and the species is no longer recognised as being found on the island.

Because of its hidden lifestyle, it is easily overlooked, although adult males can be seen wandering for a short period when they search for females and may be caught in pitfall traps. A. affinis tend to form colonies where the spiders can occur at high densities. Because of its low dispersal ability, even colonies that are just a few kilometers apart can often be quite isolated from each other.

== Description ==
These spiders are black or brownish and not particularly large; the males are about 7–9 mm (0.28–0.35 in), while the females are larger at 10–15 mm (0.39–0.59 in). They look much like Atypus piceus, but spiderlings are often very lightly colored, and the three-part posterior spinnerets do not have a light blot. Like other mygalomorph spiders, it has fangs that point straight down rather than crossing.

This spider spins an unusual web. It creates a tube of silk that is hidden partially underground, with the portion above ground being covered in leaves and other debris. The spider waits for an insect to land or crawl onto the tube, then bites through the silk to pull the insect inside. These spiders usually do not leave their webs for any reason other than mating.

These spiders become sexually mature at about 4 years. Autumn is the mating season, when the male spiders seek out a female spider and enter her burrow, where they live together until the male dies soon after mating. The female lays her egg sac inside the tube and the spiderlings hatch out the following summer, remaining with their mother for nearly another year after that.
