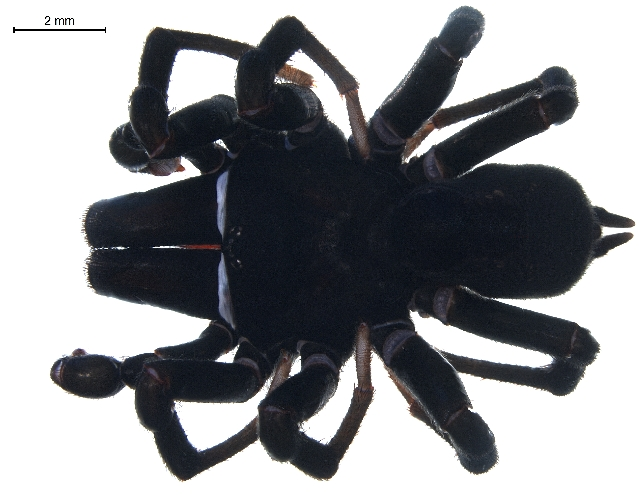
- Sphodros niger, adult male

Scientific classification
- Domain: Eukaryota
- Kingdom: Animalia
- Phylum: Arthropoda
- Subphylum: Chelicerata
- Class: Arachnida
- Order: Araneae
- Infraorder: Mygalomorphae
- Family: Atypidae
- Genus: Sphodros
- Species: S. niger

Binomial name
- Sphodros niger (Hentz, 1842)

Synonyms
- Atypus niger

= Sphodros niger =

Species of spider

Sphodros niger, the black purse-web spider, is a mygalomorph spider from the Eastern United States. It is listed as a special concern species in Connecticut.

== Description ==
Males have a body length of about 11 mm, 29 mm with extended legs. The body is black, except for chocolate-brown legs. Although the species was first described in 1842, females were first described in 1980. This results from the male's behavior of wandering about in search of mates, while females, which reside in tubes, are rarely found.

== Name ==
The species name niger is Latin for "black".
