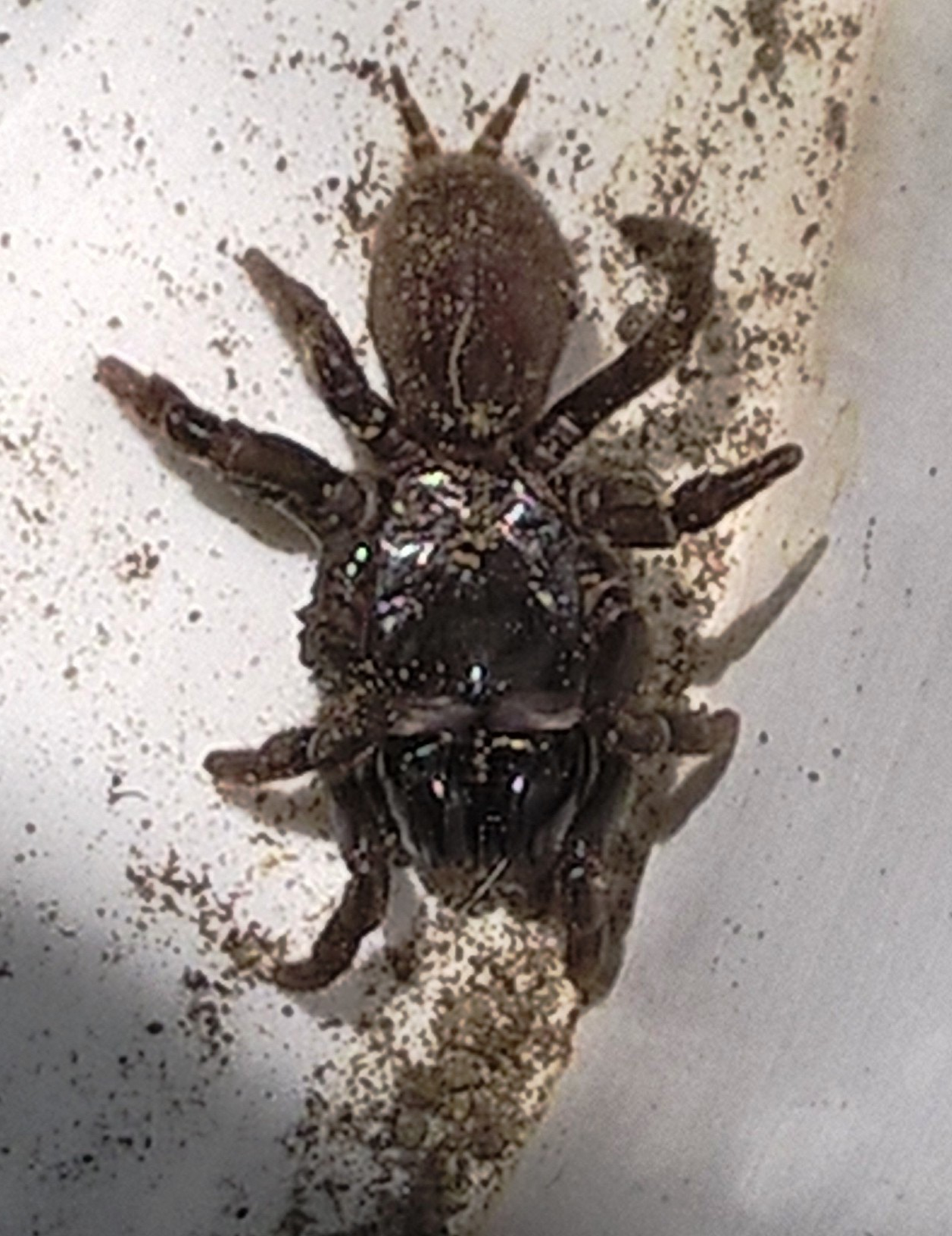

Scientific classification
- Domain: Eukaryota
- Kingdom: Animalia
- Phylum: Arthropoda
- Subphylum: Chelicerata
- Class: Arachnida
- Order: Araneae
- Infraorder: Mygalomorphae
- Family: Atypidae
- Genus: Atypus
- Species: A. muralis

Binomial name
- Atypus muralis Bertkau, 1890

Synonyms
- Atypus piceus; Proatypus muralis

= Atypus muralis =

Species of spider

Atypus muralis is a mygalomorph spider from Central Europe to Turkmenistan. It is very similar to Atypus piceus, but the posterior spinnerets consist of four instead of three segments. They also build tubes that can be up to 1 m deep. Females grow to around 12 mm, while males grow to 9 mm.
