= Johann Heinrich Sulzer =

Swiss physician and entomologist

Johann Heinrich Sulzer (18 September 1735, Winterthur – 14 August 1813, Winterthur) was a Swiss physician and entomologist.

He studied medicine at the University of Tübingen and later started a medical practice in Winterthur. As a physician he distinguished himself in his work with smallpox vaccinations. In the field of entomology, he was the author of:

- Die Kennzeichen der Insekten, nach Anleitung des Königl. Schwed. Ritters und Leibarzts Karl Linnaeus, (...) (1761) – The characteristics of insects, according to the instructions of Carl Linnaeus.
- Abgekürzte Geschichte der Insecten nach dern Linaeischen System (1776) – Abbreviated history of insects according to the Linnaean System.

== References and external links ==
- BHL Digitised works by Sulzer at Biodiversity Heritage Library.
