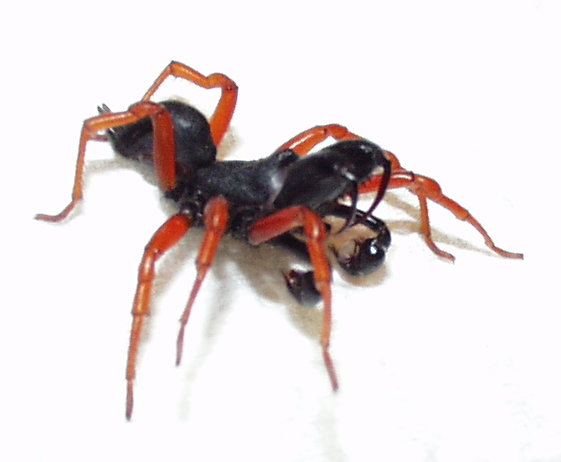
- Sphodros rufipes
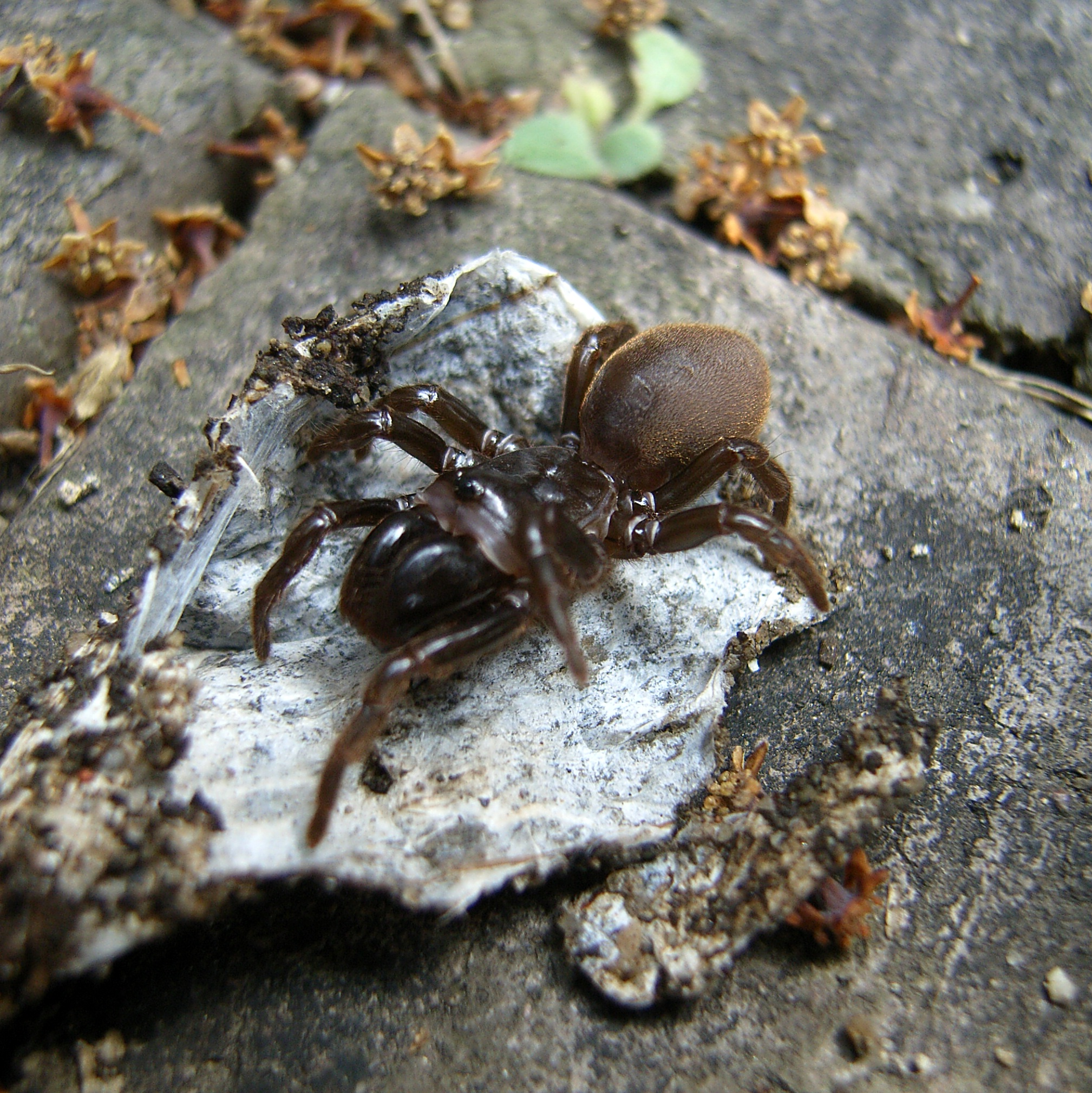
- Atypus karschi

Scientific classification
- Kingdom: Animalia
- Phylum: Arthropoda
- Subphylum: Chelicerata
- Class: Arachnida
- Order: Araneae
- Infraorder: Mygalomorphae
- Clade: Atypoidea
- Family: Atypidae; Thorell, 1870

Genera
- Atypus Latreille, 1804; Calommata Lucas, 1837; Sphodros Walckenaer, 1835

Diversity
- 3 genera, 58 species
- blue: reported countries (WSC) green: observation hotspots (iNaturalist)

= Atypical tarantula =

Atypical tarantulas Temporal range: Cretaceous–present

Spiders of family Atypidæ

Atypidae, also known as atypical tarantulas or purseweb spiders, is a spider family containing only three genera. They are accomplished ambush predators that spend most of their time in a sock-like, silken retreat on the ground from where they kill their prey.

== Distribution ==
Sphodros and Atypus occur in North America, while Atypus and Calommata occur in Asia and Africa. Only Atypus species are found in Europe. Atypus affinis, Atypus muralis, and Atypus piceus are the only mygalomorph spiders found in Central Europe.

== Biology ==
Atypus builds a silken tube parallel to the surface of the ground. While up to 8 cm of the tube lie on the ground, about 20 cm are buried vertically. The spider rests at the bottom of the tube. When prey walks on the exposed part, the spider, alerted by the vibrations, stabs the prey through the silk, cuts the web and drags the prey inside to be eaten. Calommata species, instead of building a purseweb, live in burrows. Sphodros spp. usually prop their tubes against a tree trunk.

Atypical tarantulas have huge chelicerae for their size and relatively long spinnerets (although not as long as those found in diplurids). The males are sometimes brightly colored and wander around looking for females in their tubes. The females are reddish-brown or dark-colored.

During the breeding season for A. affinis, the male leaves his own burrow and goes in search of females. When he finds the burrow of a female, he tentatively taps on the wall of the purseweb, and if the female is receptive, he ventures into the confines of the burrow. The two spiders mate and cohabit until the male dies, when the female eats him. The female makes an egg sac and hangs it in her burrow. The next summer, the eggs hatch, and the spring after that, the spiderlings leave their mother's burrow and wander off to find a suitable place to build a lair of their own.

Southeast Asian Atypus species have a body length of 7 to 21 mm in females, and about 12 mm in males. Calommata spp. of this region grow from 23 to 30 mm in females, and only about 7 mm in males.

== Genera ==
As of October 2025, this family includes three genera:

- Atypus Latreille, 1804 – Asia, Europe, North Africa. Introduced to United States
- Calommata Lucas, 1837 – Africa, Asia
- Sphodros Walckenaer, 1835 – North America
