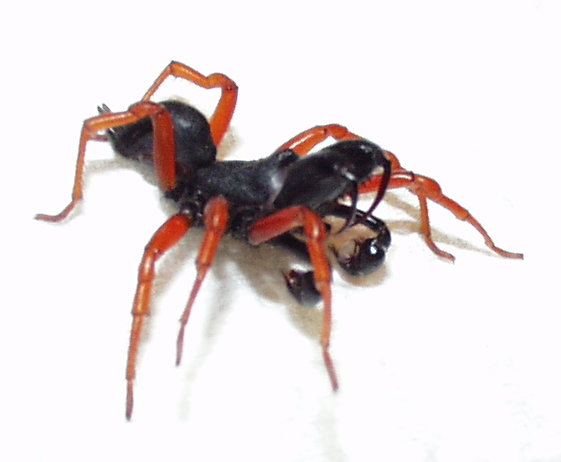
- Sphodros rufipes, Atypidae

Scientific classification
- Kingdom: Animalia
- Phylum: Arthropoda
- Subphylum: Chelicerata
- Class: Arachnida
- Order: Araneae
- Infraorder: Mygalomorphae
- Clade: Atypoidea; Thorell, 1870

Families
- See text.

Diversity
- 5 families

= Atypoidea =

Atypoidea Temporal range: Triassic–present

Superfamily of arachnids

Atypoidea is a clade of mygalomorph spiders, one of the two main groups into which the mygalomorphs are divided (the other being Avicularioidea). It has been treated at the rank of superfamily. It contains five families of spiders:

- Atypidae Thorell, 1870
- Antrodiaetidae Gertsch, 1940
- Mecicobothriidae Holmberg, 1882
- Hexurellidae Hedin & Bond, 2019
- Megahexuridae Hedin & Bond,2019

Spiders from atypoid families live in burrows and use silk to build many different types of burrow entrance constructs, including purse webs, trapdoors, funnel-and-sheet webs, turrets and silken collars.

== Phylogeny ==
The following cladogram illustrates the relationships between atypoid mygalomorph spiders based on the molecular phylogenetic analyses of Hedin et al (2019).

- - Hypochilidae
  - - Avicularioidea
    - Atypoidea
      - Hexurellidae
        Hexurella
      - - Mecicobothriidae
          Mecicobothrium
        - - Atypidae
            - Calommata
            - - Atypus
              - Sphodros
          - - Megahexuridae
              Megahexura
            - Antrodiaetidae
              - Aliatypus
              - - Hexura
                - - Antrodiaetus
                  - Atypoides
