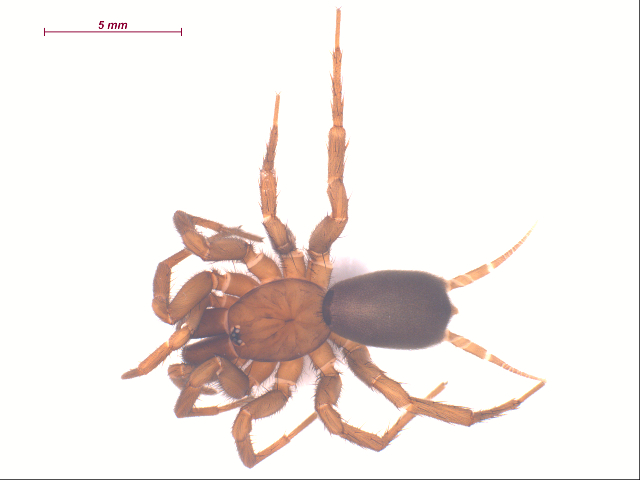

Scientific classification
- Kingdom: Animalia
- Phylum: Arthropoda
- Subphylum: Chelicerata
- Class: Arachnida
- Order: Araneae
- Infraorder: Mygalomorphae
- Family: Antrodiaetidae
- Genus: Hexura
- Species: H. picea

Binomial name
- Hexura picea Simon, 1885

= Hexura picea =

Species of spider

Hexura picea is a species of folding-door spider in the family Antrodiaetidae. Endemic to North America, its distribution is confined to the Pacific Northwest, extending from southern Oregon to the Canadian border. This mygalomorph spider was first described by Eugène Louis Simon in 1885. Notably, in 2019, taxonomic revisions prompted its reclassification from the family Mecicobothriidae to Antrodiaetidae.

== Taxonomy ==
Hexura picea was first described by Eugène Simon in 1885, originally placing it within the family Mecicobothriidae. However, a phylogenomic analysis by Hedin et al. (2019) found strong support for splitting Mecicobothriidae into multiple distinct lineages, with the genus Hexura being more closely related to Antrodiaetidae than to other mecicobothriids. As a result, Hexura was reclassified into Antrodiaetidae, where it is currently placed in the infraorder Mygalomorphae of the order Araneae.

== Description ==
Hexura picea is a small mygalomorph spider with a compact and robust body. The body length (excluding legs) of adult individuals ranges between 7–12 mm for females, while males tend to be slightly smaller. The cephalothorax is dark brown to black, with a glossy appearance, and the abdomen is covered in fine, velvety hairs, giving it a duller look.

Males are distinguished from females by their longer, more slender legs and smaller body size. They also possess specialized pedipalps used in mating. Juveniles resemble adults but are generally lighter in color, with a more pronounced mottled pattern on their abdomens.

Like other mygalomorphs, Hexura picea has large, downward-pointing chelicerae adapted for grasping and envenomating prey.

== Range ==
Distribution map of the three species of genus Hexura; (blue) H. picea, (Pink) H. rothi and (Yellow) H. vandal.

Hexura picea is native to the Pacific Northwest region of North America, primarily found in the states of Washington, Oregon, and northern California, with some records extending into British Columbia, Canada. The species is known to inhabit moist, temperate forests, particularly in coniferous ecosystems dominated by Douglas fir (Pseudotsuga menziesii) and western hemlock (Tsuga heterophylla).

It has been observed in moist, shaded environments, often in areas with thick leaf litter, decaying logs, and moss-covered ground. These habitats provide the necessary humidity and temperature stability crucial for mygalomorph spiders. Within its range, Hexura picea is generally found at lower to mid-elevations, but has been recorded in higher-altitude forests up to 1,500 meters (4,900 feet). The species is known for its limited dispersal ability, as juveniles do not engage in ballooning like many araneomorph spiders. This contributes to its localized populations and restricted geographic range.
