= Antrodiaetus microunicolor =

Scientific classification
- Kingdom: Animalia
- Phylum: Arthropoda
- Subphylum: Chelicerata
- Class: Arachnida
- Order: Araneae
- Infraorder: Mygalomorphae
- Family: Antrodiaetidae
- Genus: Antrodiaetus
- Species: A. microunicolor

Binomial name
- Antrodiaetus microunicolor Hendrixson & Bond, 2005

Species of spider

Antrodiaetus microunicolor is a species of antrodiaetid mygalomorph spider. It is found in the United States of America.

== Taxonomy and etymology ==
A. microunicolor was originally described as a form of Antrodiaetus unicolor, an apparently very varied species. Brent Hendrixson and Jason Bond provided evidence, in 2005, that the two were separate species, based on the size difference and having different breeding seasons (when the male leaves his burrow in search of a female).

The specific name comes from a mixture of micro and unicolor, referring to the diminutive size of the species (compared to A. unicolor).

== Description ==
A. microunicolor males lack a ventral macroseta on the first metatarsus distally. They are less than 4.50mm in length. The dorsal shield of the prosoma, the pedipalps and leg II-IV are greyish-tan, with distal segments lighter. Eyes underlined with black pigment. Femur I light greyish-tan, patella I greyish-brown, tibia, metatarsus and tarsus I orangish-red. Chelicerae darker than the dorsal shield of the prosoma. Sternum pale greyish-yellow, labium darker. Opisthosoma purplish-grey.

Females are under 7mm in length. Dorsal shield of prosoma, opisthosoma, pedipalps, and legs yellowish-brown, head region slightly darker. Eyes underlined with black pigment. Chelicerae light brown. Sternum orangish-brown, labium darker. Abdomen yellowish-brown with faint purple pigment, cardiac mark weakly indicated as pale longitudinal band along midline.

== Biology ==
Antrodiaetus microunicolor lives in burrows 8-10mm thick and 15–20 cm deep. These are variable in curvature, which is dictated by roots, stones, etcetera. They are slightly wider at both ends. It is lightly to heavily lined with silk and the collapsible turret is nearly perpendicular to the substrate.

Antrodiaetus microunicolor lives at elevations of 690-1120m. It lives in a cool and humid climate, under a dense canopy of Quercus, Acer and Betula. Underneath consists of dense patches of Rhododendron maximum and Kalmia latifolia. The antrodiaetid makes its burrows under the bases of overhanging tree roots to prevent flooding. Aggregations of such burrows are typically found on stream banks and ravine slopes. The soil it makes its burrows in is wet and spongy, and also sandy and loam-like. Burrows are also found in moss mats, rock crevices and under decaying logs. The species is highly abundant at Coweeta (the type locality).

Males begin searching for females at about late-October and finish in December, whereas A. unicolor males begin searching in mid-September and stop in mid-October. There is no overlap recorded between the two species. Males of A. microunicolor take special care to conceal their burrows before the breeding season.

Females also have a period of seasonal activity, though not so much is known about this. Females of A. unicolor found roughly during the male breeding season have no offspring and only a few are gravid, whereas A. microunicolor found in their breeding season have 90-150 offspring scattered in their burrows.

They feed on the multiple varied invertebrates available to them.
