= Hexura rothi =

Scientific classification
- Kingdom: Animalia
- Phylum: Arthropoda
- Subphylum: Chelicerata
- Class: Arachnida
- Order: Araneae
- Infraorder: Mygalomorphae
- Family: Antrodiaetidae
- Genus: Hexura
- Species: H. rothi

Binomial name
- Hexura rothi Gertsch & Platnick, 1979
- Distribution map of the three species of genus Hexura; (blue) H. picea, (Pink) H. rothi and (Yellow) H. vandal.

Species of spider

Hexura rothi is a species of spider. It was described by Gertsch & Platnick, 1979 — USA. Originally placed with Mecicobothriidae, it was moved to Antrodiaetidae in 2019.

It has two pairs of spinnerets unlike Hexura picea which has three pairs. It is found in the southern Central Oregon Coast Ranges through the Klamath Mountains into Del Norte, California.
