= Antrodiaetus lincolnianus =

Scientific classification
- Domain: Eukaryota
- Kingdom: Animalia
- Phylum: Arthropoda
- Subphylum: Chelicerata
- Class: Arachnida
- Order: Araneae
- Infraorder: Mygalomorphae
- Family: Antrodiaetidae
- Genus: Antrodiaetus
- Species: A. lincolnianus

Binomial name
- Antrodiaetus lincolnianus (Worley, 1928)

Species of spider

Antrodiaetus lincolnianus is a species of folding-door spider in the family Antrodiaetidae. It is found in the United States.
