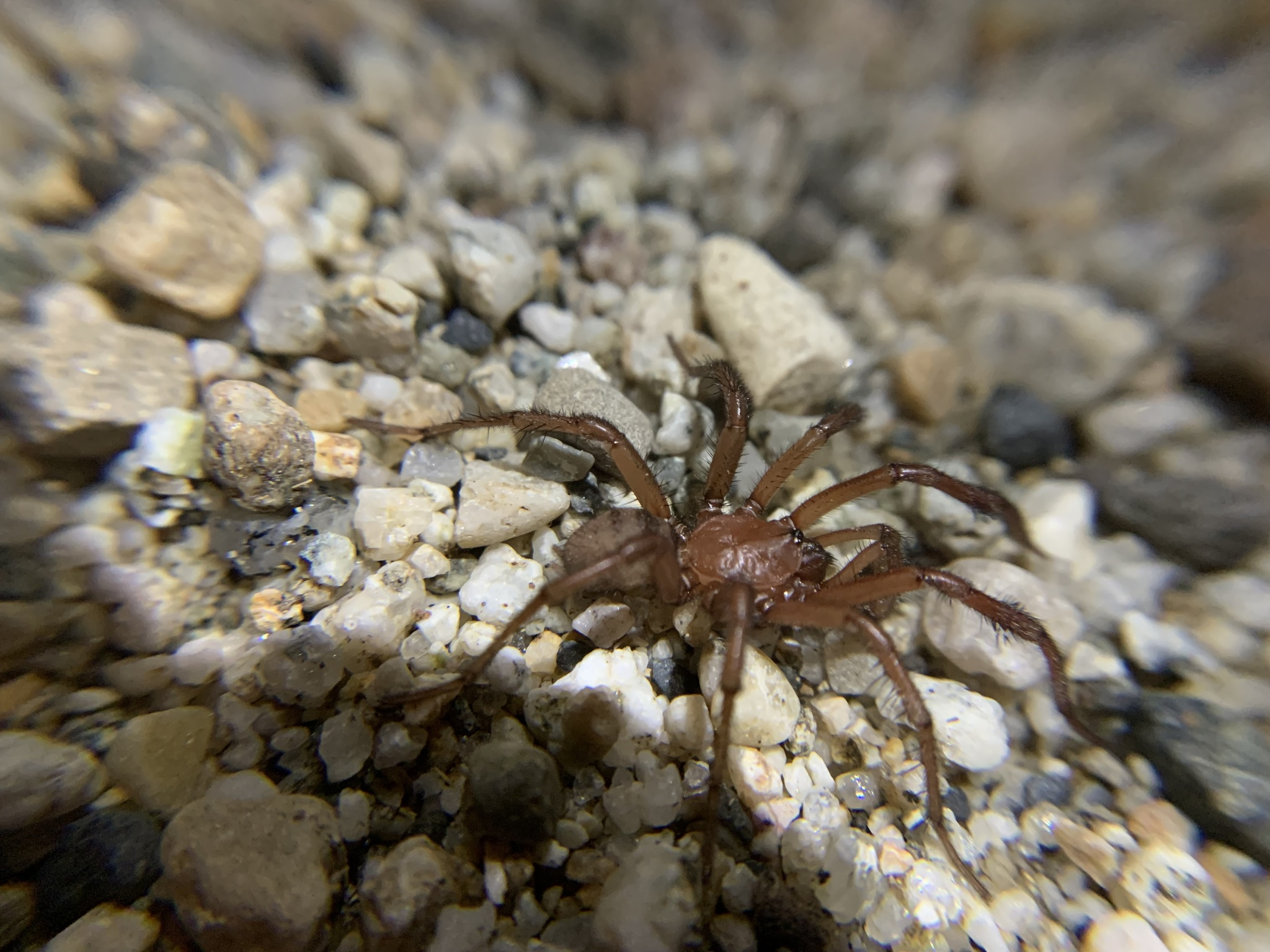

Scientific classification
- Kingdom: Animalia
- Phylum: Arthropoda
- Subphylum: Chelicerata
- Class: Arachnida
- Order: Araneae
- Infraorder: Mygalomorphae
- Family: Antrodiaetidae
- Genus: Antrodiaetus
- Species: A. montanus

Binomial name
- Antrodiaetus montanus (Chamberlin & Ivie, 1935)

= Antrodiaetus montanus =

Species of spider

Antrodiaetus montanus is a species of folding-door spider in the family Antrodiaetidae. It is found in the United States.
