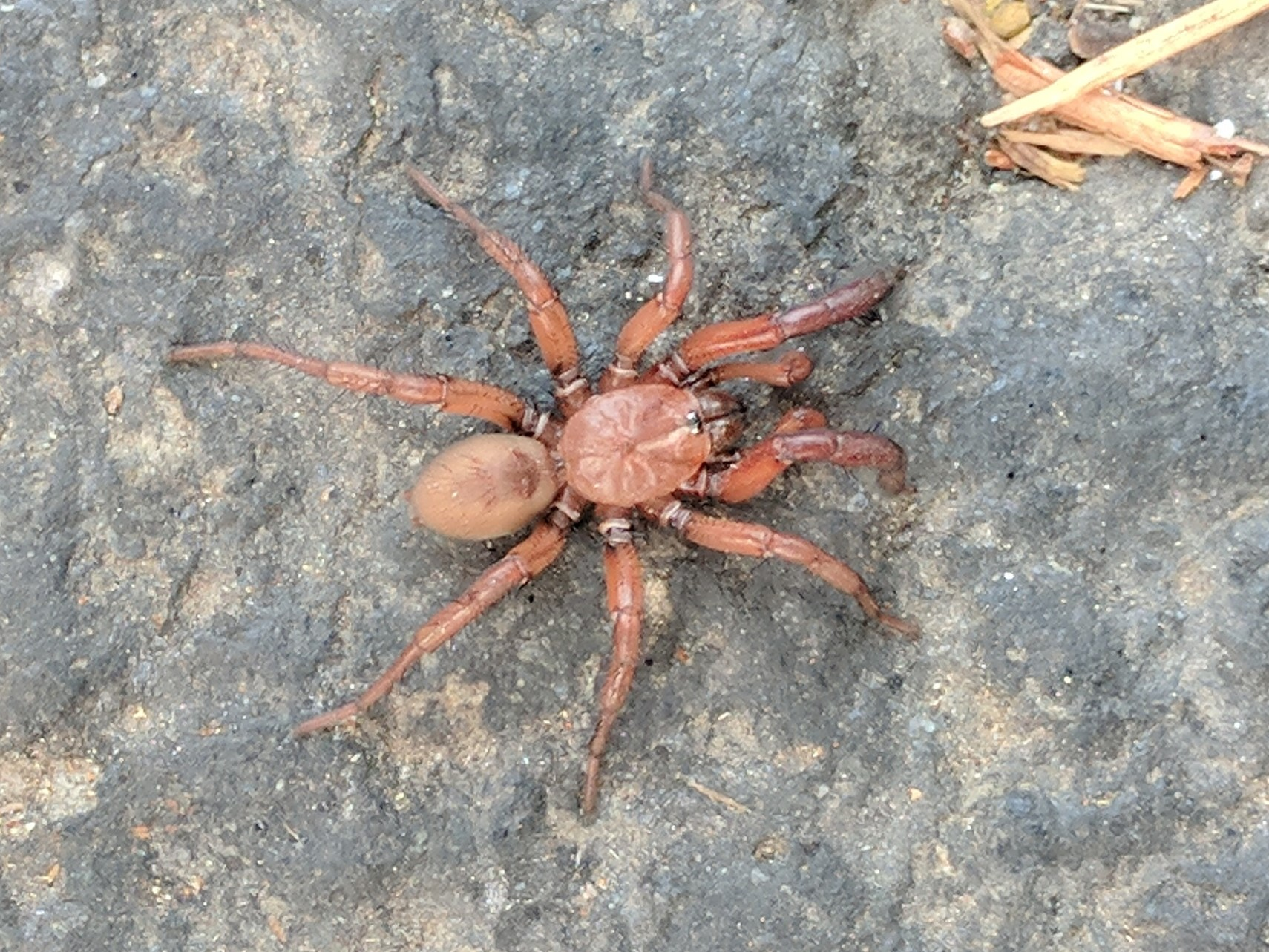

Scientific classification
- Kingdom: Animalia
- Phylum: Arthropoda
- Subphylum: Chelicerata
- Class: Arachnida
- Order: Araneae
- Infraorder: Mygalomorphae
- Family: Antrodiaetidae
- Genus: Antrodiaetus
- Species: A. pugnax

Binomial name
- Antrodiaetus pugnax (Chamberlin, 1917)

= Antrodiaetus pugnax =

Species of spider

Antrodiaetus pugnax is a species of folding-door spider in the family Antrodiaetidae. It is found in the United States.
