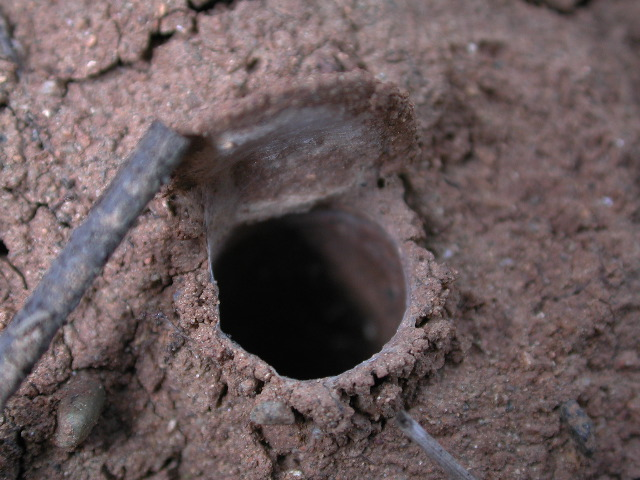

Scientific classification
- Domain: Eukaryota
- Kingdom: Animalia
- Phylum: Arthropoda
- Subphylum: Chelicerata
- Class: Arachnida
- Order: Araneae
- Infraorder: Mygalomorphae
- Family: Antrodiaetidae
- Genus: Aliatypus
- Species: A. californicus

Binomial name
- Aliatypus californicus (Banks, 1896)

= Aliatypus californicus =

Species of spider

Aliatypus californicus is a species in the spider family Antrodiaetidae, also called the family of folding trapdoor spiders. It is found in the United States.
