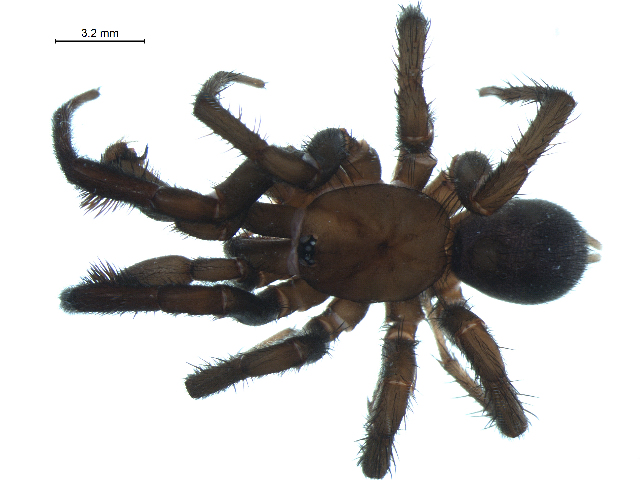
- A. pacificus, adult male

Conservation status
- Secure (NatureServe)

Scientific classification
- Kingdom: Animalia
- Phylum: Arthropoda
- Subphylum: Chelicerata
- Class: Arachnida
- Order: Araneae
- Infraorder: Mygalomorphae
- Family: Antrodiaetidae
- Genus: Antrodiaetus
- Species: A. pacificus

Binomial name
- Antrodiaetus pacificus (Simon, 1884)

Synonyms
- Brachybothrium pacificum Simon, 1884

= Antrodiaetus pacificus =

Species of spider

Antrodiaetus pacificus is a species of mygalomorph spiders native to the Pacific Northwest. Both male and female were first described by French arachnologist Eugène Louis Simon in 1884 under the name Brachybothrium pacificum. The genus name is a combination of the Greek "antrodiaitos" (αντροδιαιτος), meaning "living in caves", "antron" (αντρον), meaning "cave", and "diaita (διαιτα), meaning "way of life, dwelling". The specific epithet refers to its geographical distribution along the pacific coast of North America, between San Francisco Bay and Alaska. It is the northernmost mygalomorph spider in North America.

Both males and females have a carapace that is dark brown to black, and two to three sclerotized patches on the abdomen. Females are about 13 millimetres (0.51 in) long, and males are about 11 millimetres (0.43 in) long. They are active year-round, but most activity occurs between late July and early September, peaking around mating season between early June and late November. They live in cool, damp forest and build burrows in soft substrates, usually sand, moss, or decaying wood, where they brood their eggs and overwinter. During the day, they keep the entrance closed, but when the sun sets and it is sufficiently dark, they will open the burrow and wait at the entrance for potential prey to wander by, predominantly beetles.
