= Turret spider =

Turret spider is a common name for several spiders and may refer to:

- Atypoides riversi, native to northern California
- Lycosa arenicola
