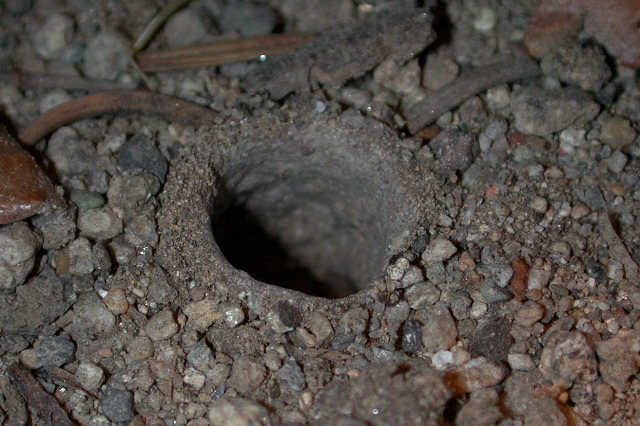

Scientific classification
- Domain: Eukaryota
- Kingdom: Animalia
- Phylum: Arthropoda
- Subphylum: Chelicerata
- Class: Arachnida
- Order: Araneae
- Infraorder: Mygalomorphae
- Family: Antrodiaetidae
- Genus: Atypoides
- Species: A. gertschi

Binomial name
- Atypoides gertschi (Coyle, 1968)

= Atypoides gertschi =

Species of spider

Atypoides gertschi is a species of folding-door spider in the family Antrodiaetidae. It is found in the United States.
