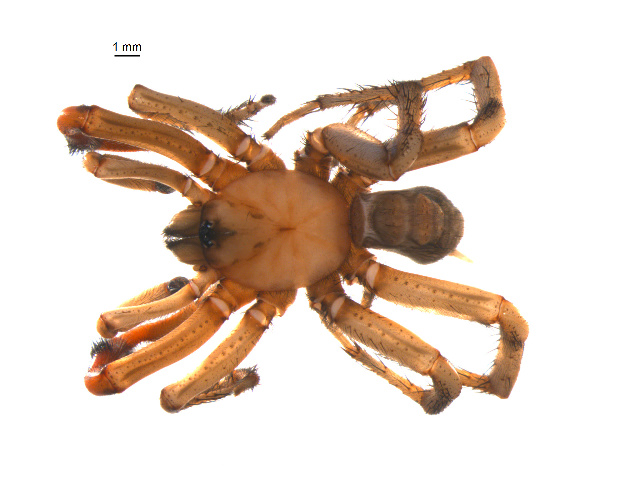
- A. hageni, adult male
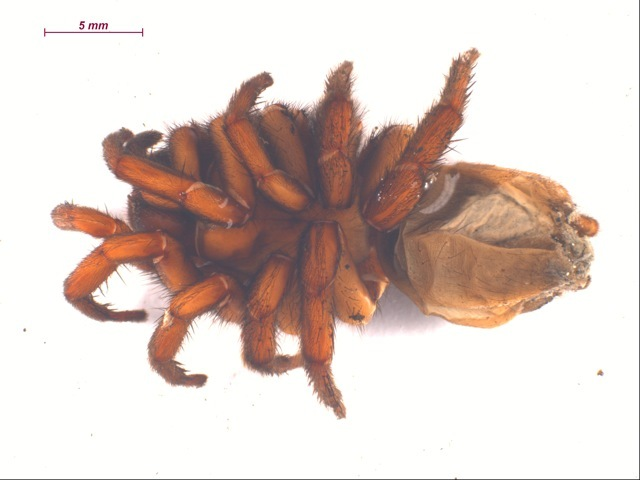
- A. hageni, adult female

Scientific classification
- Kingdom: Animalia
- Phylum: Arthropoda
- Subphylum: Chelicerata
- Class: Arachnida
- Order: Araneae
- Infraorder: Mygalomorphae
- Family: Antrodiaetidae
- Genus: Antrodiaetus
- Species: A. hageni

Binomial name
- Antrodiaetus hageni (Chamberlin, 1917)

= Antrodiaetus hageni =

Species of spider

Antrodiaetus hageni is a species of folding-door spider in the family Antrodiaetidae. It is found in the United States and Canada.
