= Helvibis tingo =

Scientific classification
- Kingdom: Animalia
- Phylum: Arthropoda
- Subphylum: Chelicerata
- Class: Arachnida
- Order: Araneae
- Infraorder: Araneomorphae
- Family: Theridiidae
- Genus: Helvibis
- Species: H. tingo

Binomial name
- Helvibis tingo Levi, 1964

Species of spider

Helvibis tingo is a species of comb-footed spider in the family Theridiidae. It is found in Peru.
