= Pardosa thorelli =

Scientific classification
- Kingdom: Animalia
- Phylum: Arthropoda
- Subphylum: Chelicerata
- Class: Arachnida
- Order: Araneae
- Infraorder: Araneomorphae
- Family: Lycosidae
- Genus: Pardosa
- Species: P. thorelli

Binomial name
- Pardosa thorelli (Collett, 1876)

Species of spider

Pardosa thorelli is a species of wolf spider in the genus Pardosa that is endemic to Norway. The spider was first described in 1876 and named 'Lycosa thorelli' but was moved to its current status in 1955. Its taxonomy is disputed and the arachnologists Kjetil Aakra and Erling Haugesuggest suggest that it is a member of the genus Acantholycosa. It is hairy and generally dark brown to black without distinctive markings. The male spider can be distinguished from related spiders by its large feet. The female has an unusual epigyne that has a raised brownish shield in the middle of a pear-shaped field.

== Taxonomy ==
Pardosa thorelli is species of a wolf spider, a member of the family Lycosidae. It was first described by the arachnologist Robert Collett in 1876. He originally allocated it to the genus Lycosa but it was moved to its current situation in 1955 by Carl Friedrich Roewer. The genus is one of the Pardosini genera alongside Acantholycosa, Mongolicosa, Sibirocosa, and Pyrenecosa. The specific epithet is given to honor Swedish arachnologist Tamerlan Thorell. Kjetil Aakra and Erling Hauge suggest that the holotype is a member of the genus Acantholycosa although this is not confirmed.

== Description ==
Pardosa thorelli is between 8 and 8.75 mm (0.315 and 0.344 in) long. The spider has a brownish-black ovoid cephalothorax that has a hairy carapace, the upperside of the cephalothorax, and a dark brown shiny sternum, or underside. The eye field is blackish. Its opisthosoma is also dark brown and hairy. The whole spider lacks distinctive markings. Its legs are hairy. The female can be distinguished from other members of the genus by its copulatory organs, particularly the distinctive epigyne, the external and most visible of its copulatory organs, that has a large depression in it and a pear-shaped field that has a raised brownish shield in the middle. The male can be distinguished by its large feet.

== Distribution ==
Pardosa thorelli is endemic to Norway. It was first discovered near Dovre.

== Bibliography ==
- Aakra, Kjetil; Hauge, Erling (2003). "Checklist of Norwegian spiders (Arachnida: Araneae), including Svalbard and Jan Mayen". Norwegian Journal of Entomology (50): 109–129.
- Collett, Robert (1876). "Oversigt af Norges Araneida. I. Saltigradae, Citigradae" [Overview of the Araneida of Norway. I. Saltigradae, Citigradae]. Forhandlinger i Videnskab-Selskabets i Christiania (in Danish): 225–259.
- Marusik, Yuri M.; Azarkina, Galina N.; Koponen, Seppo (2003). "A survey of east Palearctic Lycosidae (Aranei). II. Genus Acantholycosa F. Dahl, 1908 and related new genera". Arthropoda Selecta. 12 (2): 101–148.
