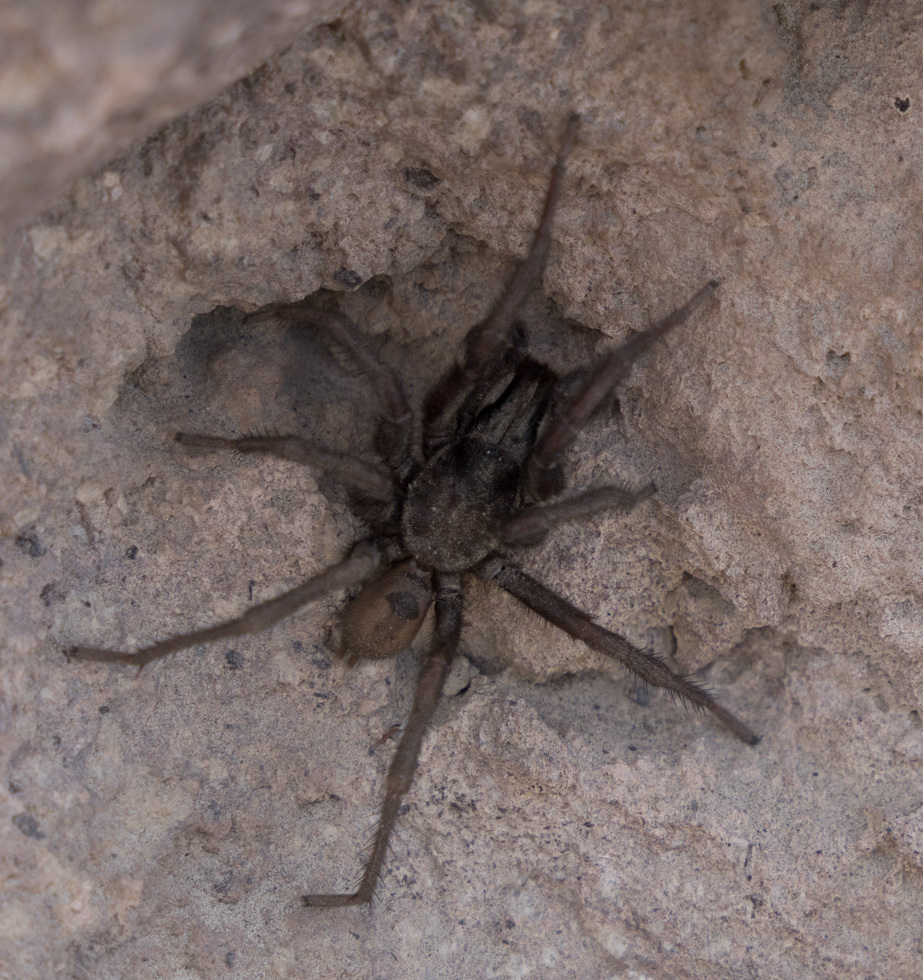
- A. gertschi in California
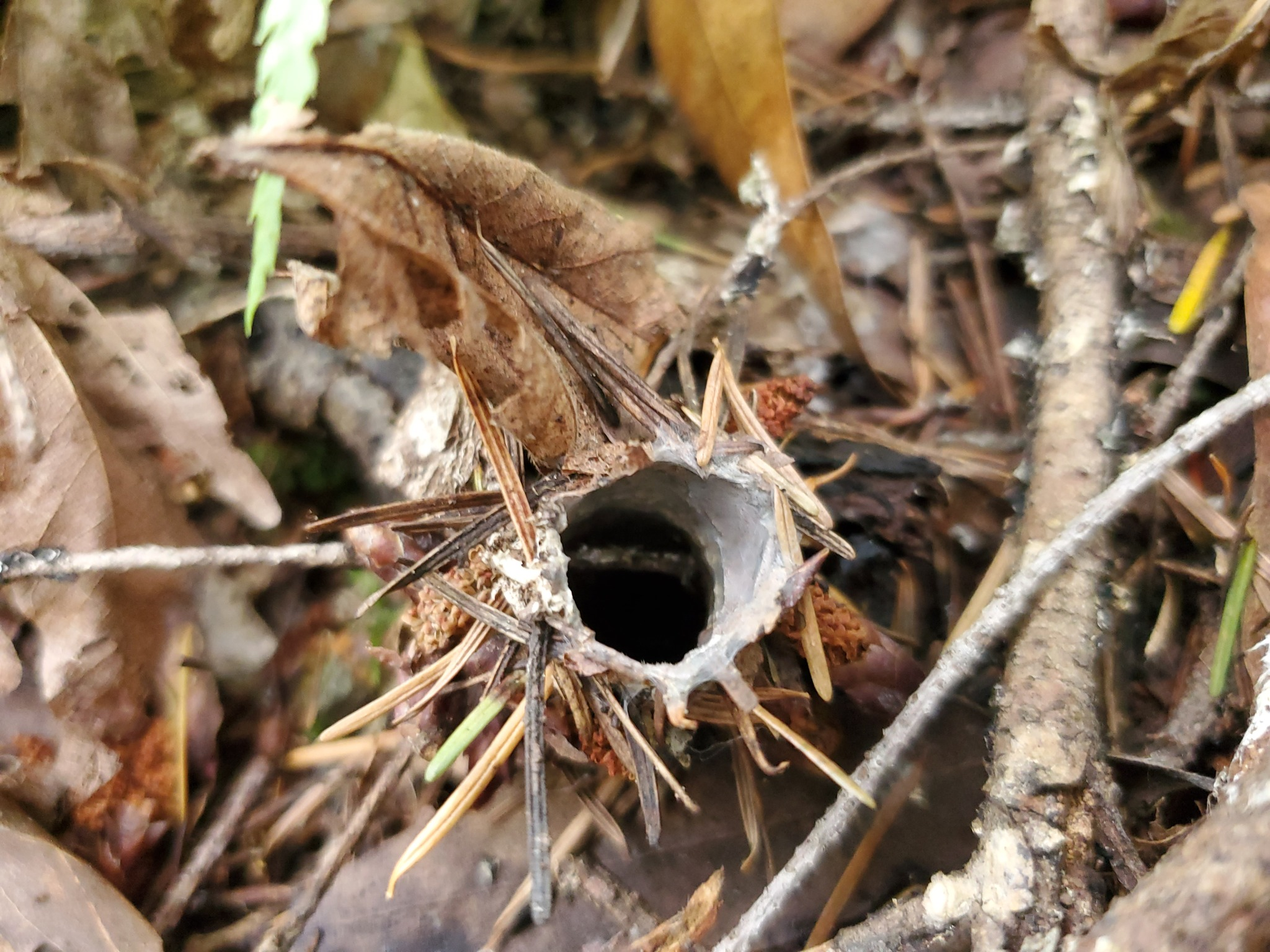
- A. riversi burrow entrance

Scientific classification
- Kingdom: Animalia
- Phylum: Arthropoda
- Subphylum: Chelicerata
- Class: Arachnida
- Order: Araneae
- Infraorder: Mygalomorphae
- Family: Antrodiaetidae
- Genus: Atypoides; O. Pickard-Cambridge, 1883

Type species
- A. riversi O. Pickard-Cambridge, 1883

Species
- Atypoides gertschi Coyle, 1968; Atypoides hadros Coyle, 1968; Atypoides riversi O. Pickard-Cambridge, 1883

= Atypoides =

Genus of spiders

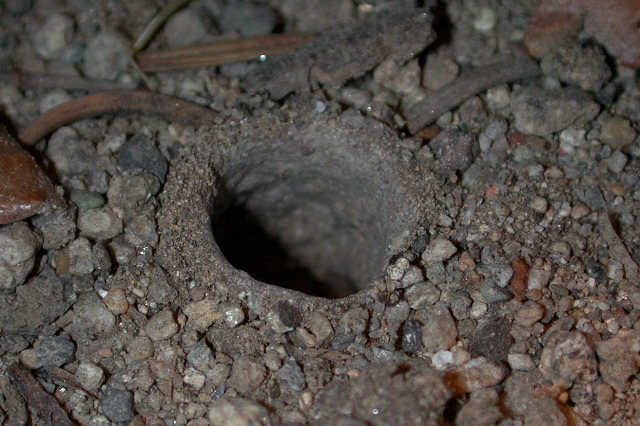
A. gertschi burrow entrance in northern California.

Atypoides is a genus of North American folding trapdoor spiders. It was first described by Octavius Pickard-Cambridge in 1883, and it has only been found in United States. It was synonymized with the genus Antrodiaetus in 2007, but was restored to its former independent status in 2019.

== Species ==
As of October 2026, this genus includes three species:

- Atypoides gertschi Coyle, 1968 – United States
- Atypoides hadros Coyle, 1968 – United States
- Atypoides riversi O. Pickard-Cambridge, 1883 – United States
