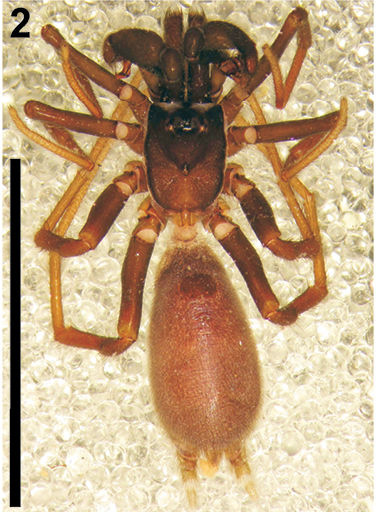
- Male of Calommata meridionalis (Scale bars: 5mm)

Conservation status
- Near Threatened (SANBI Red List)

Scientific classification
- Kingdom: Animalia
- Phylum: Arthropoda
- Subphylum: Chelicerata
- Class: Arachnida
- Order: Araneae
- Infraorder: Mygalomorphae
- Family: Atypidae
- Genus: Calommata
- Species: C. meridionalis

Binomial name
- Calommata meridionalis Fourie, Haddad & Jocqué, 2011

= Calommata meridionalis =

Species of spider

Calommata meridionalis is a species of spider in the genus Calommata of the family Atypidae. It is endemic to South Africa, where it is commonly known as the Free State African purse-web spider.

== Distribution ==
Calommata meridionalis is known only from the Free State province of South Africa, where it has been recorded from three localities: Erfenis Dam Nature Reserve, the National Botanical Gardens in Bloemfontein, and Vaal Dam near Oranjeville.

== Habitat and ecology ==
This species is a free-living burrow dweller found in the Grassland Biome. Males have been collected exclusively by pitfall traps during spring and early summer (September to early December) during the mating season. They are found in areas with dark clay and loamy-clay soils, usually near water bodies, and not from sites with sandy soils. The females and their purse-webs have yet to be discovered.

== Conservation status ==
Calommata meridionalis is listed as Near Threatened under the B criterion by the South African National Biodiversity Institute (SANBI). As a Free State endemic described in 2011, it is known only from males and recorded from three localities in a restricted area at elevations of 1332-1548 meters above sea level. The species is suspected to occur at between 10 and 15 locations and faces ongoing decline of suitable habitat due to crop cultivation and erosion by dam banks.

The species is protected in Erfenis Dam Nature Reserve and the National Botanical Gardens, Bloemfontein. It is threatened by habitat loss due to crop cultivation, erosion of river and dam banks, and habitat degradation from livestock grazing.

== Description ==
Only the male of Calommata meridionalis is known. Like other members of the genus, it shows the characteristic features of Atypidae, including the reduced size of the first leg and the typical mygalomorph body plan.
