= Hexura vandal =

Scientific classification
- Kingdom: Animalia
- Phylum: Arthropoda
- Subphylum: Chelicerata
- Class: Arachnida
- Order: Araneae
- Infraorder: Mygalomorphae
- Family: Antrodiaetidae
- Genus: Hexura
- Species: H. vandal

Binomial name
- Hexura vandal Calatayud-Mascarell, Briggs & Hamilton, 2026
- Distribution map of the three species of genus Hexura; (blue) H. picea, (Pink) H. rothi and (Yellow) H. vandal.

Species of spider

Hexura vandal is a species of folding trapdoor spiders (Antrodiaetidae). It is the easternmost occurring species of genus Hexura with a very limited range in the Rocky Mountains of northern Idaho. Similar to the other species of genus Hexura, its range is geographically separated from other species due to the formation of the Columbia Basin during the late Miocene to early Pliocene epochs.

Due to this species small and restricted range and the lack of protected habitats, it is vulnerable to various human activities. This includes logging which is common throughout the area and more frequent wildfires often occurring during mating season. This makes this species likely threatened and endangered.

== Discovery ==
The species was discovered in 2026. The discovery of this species made it the easternmost occurring species of the genus located around 500 kilometers from the genus usual distribution in the Pacific Northwest region and Cascadian Mountains of the US and Canada.

=== Etymology ===
Its specific name is in honor of the Vandals of the University of Idaho (UIdaho). The name is also due to the species range being close to the universities campus. Instead of the specific name being a Latin descriptor, the discoverers choose the name “Vandal” as a direct node to them. According to Chris A. Hamilton, the decision to name this species in honor of the Vadals did not take long.
