= Helvibis =

Scientific classification
- Kingdom: Animalia
- Phylum: Arthropoda
- Subphylum: Chelicerata
- Class: Arachnida
- Order: Araneae
- Infraorder: Araneomorphae
- Family: Theridiidae
- Genus: Helvibis; Keyserling, 1884

Type species
- H. thorelli Keyserling, 1884

Species
- 10, see text

Synonyms
- Formicinoides Keyserling, 1884

Genus of spiders

Helvibis is a genus of spiders in the family Theridiidae that was first described by Eugen von Keyserling in 1884. It is a senior synonym of Formicinoides.

== Species ==
As of May 2020 it contains ten species, found in Trinidad, and from Panama to Brazil:

- Helvibis brasiliana (Keyserling, 1884) – Peru
- Helvibis chilensis (Keyserling, 1884) – Chile, Brazil
- Helvibis germaini Simon, 1895 – Peru, Brazil
- Helvibis infelix (O. Pickard-Cambridge, 1880) – Brazil
- Helvibis longicauda Keyserling, 1891 – Brazil
- Helvibis longistyla (F. O. Pickard-Cambridge, 1902) – Panama, Trinidad
- Helvibis monticola Keyserling, 1891 – Brazil
- Helvibis rossi Levi, 1964 – Peru
- Helvibis thorelli Keyserling, 1884 (type) – Peru, Brazil
- Helvibis tingo Levi, 1964 – Peru
