= Hexurella encina =

Scientific classification
- Kingdom: Animalia
- Phylum: Arthropoda
- Subphylum: Chelicerata
- Class: Arachnida
- Order: Araneae
- Infraorder: Mygalomorphae
- Family: Hexurellidae
- Genus: Hexurella
- Species: H. encina

Binomial name
- Hexurella encina Gertsch & Platnick, 1979

Species of spider

Hexurella encina is a species of spiders native to Mexico. It was first described by Gertsch and Platnick in 1979. It is from the family Hexurellidae.
