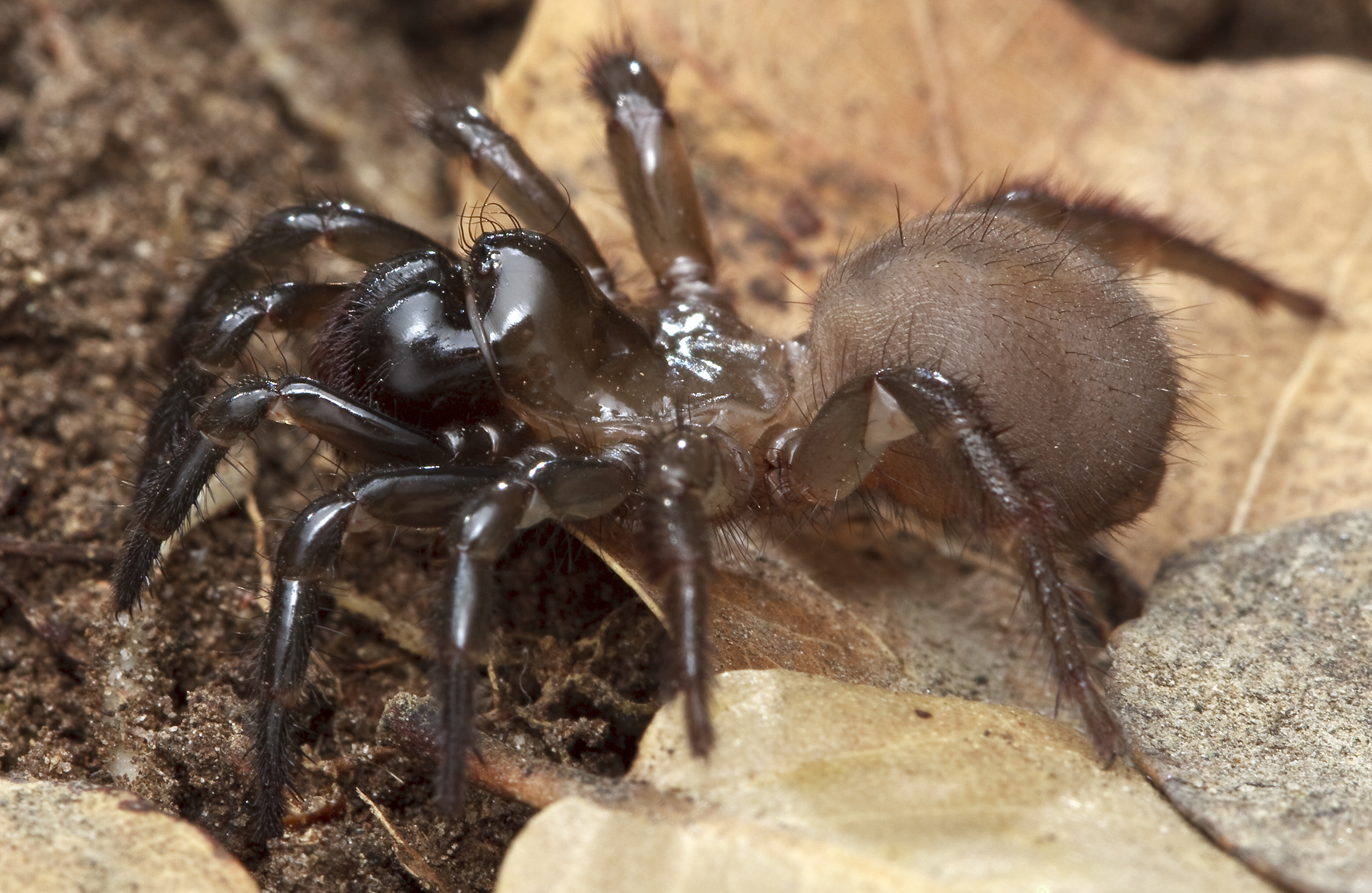
- Female A. torridus
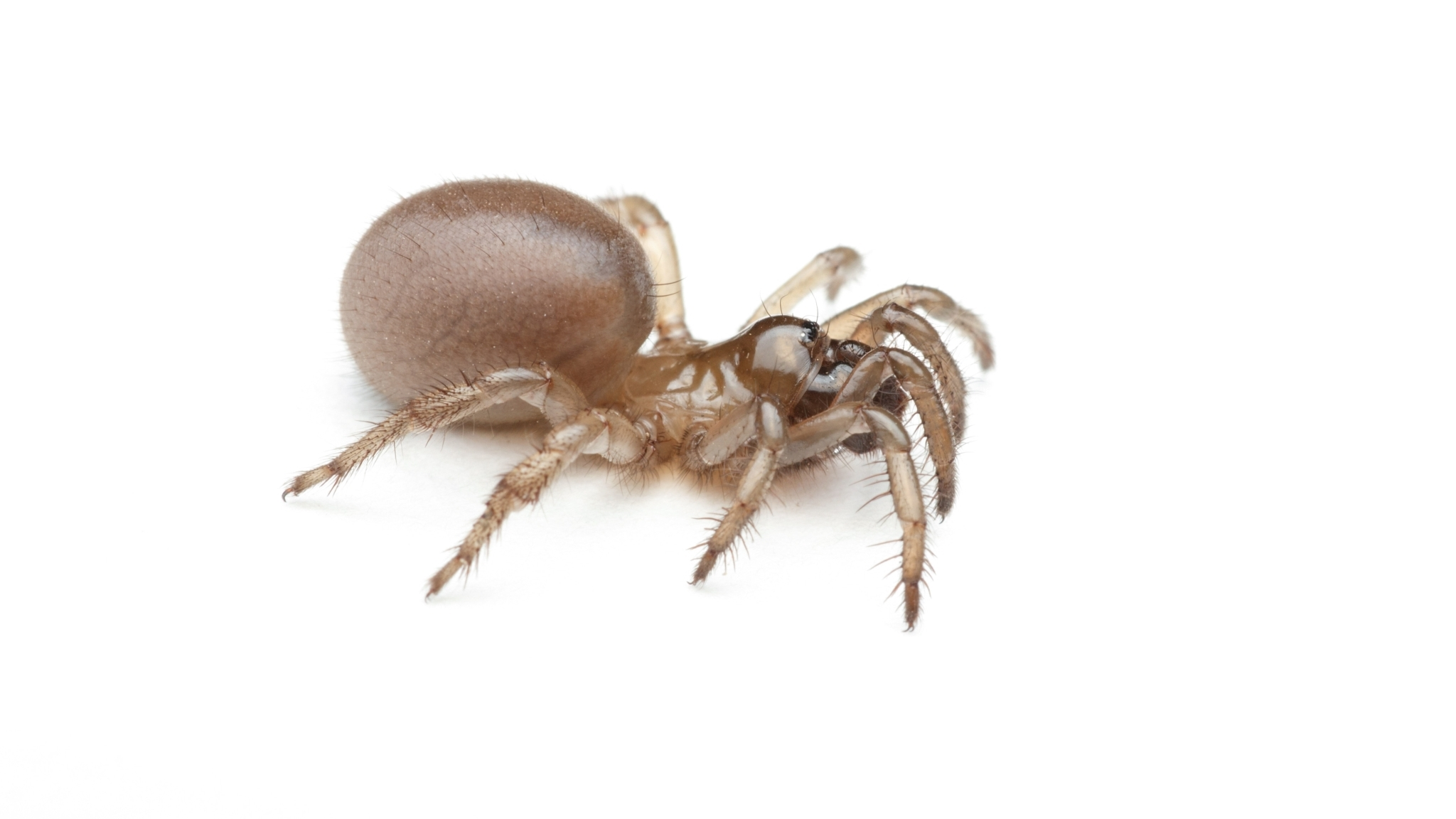
- A. thompsoni

Scientific classification
- Kingdom: Animalia
- Phylum: Arthropoda
- Subphylum: Chelicerata
- Class: Arachnida
- Order: Araneae
- Infraorder: Mygalomorphae
- Family: Antrodiaetidae
- Genus: Aliatypus; Smith, 1908

Type species
- A. californicus (Banks, 1896)

Species
- 14, see text

= Aliatypus =

Genus of spiders

Aliatypus is a genus of North American folding trapdoor spiders first described by Chas. Piper Smith in 1908. They resemble members of Ctenizidae in morphology and behavior, but this is due to convergent evolution rather than direct relation. They are most closely related to members of Antrodiaetus, which build collar doors. It is likely that the shift from using collar doors to using trapdoors is what allowed them to survive in hot, dry conditions where their closest relatives could not.

Often found in roadside banks or ravines, they build a burrow perpendicular to the surface with a wafer-like trapdoor entrance to catch prey. Burrows are often clustered together, sometimes quite densely in more favorable positions.

They are native to the western United States, where the complex landscape creates pockets of isolated species limited to small regions. As one of the most abundant genera of trapdoor spiders in California, it is argued that their sedentary lifestyle and limited dispersal could benefit studies in the biogeography of California and the surrounding regions.

== Species ==
As of October 2026, this genus includes fourteen species:

- Aliatypus aquilonius Coyle, 1975 – United States
- Aliatypus californicus (Banks, 1896) – United States
- Aliatypus coylei Hedin & Carlson, 2011 – United States
- Aliatypus erebus Coyle, 1975 – United States
- Aliatypus gnomus Coyle, 1975 – United States
- Aliatypus gulosus Coyle, 1975 – United States
- Aliatypus isolatus Coyle, 1975 – United States
- Aliatypus janus Coyle, 1975 – United States
- Aliatypus plutonis Coyle, 1975 – United States
- Aliatypus roxxiae Satler & Hedin, 2013 – United States
- Aliatypus starretti Satler & Hedin, 2013 – United States
- Aliatypus thompsoni Coyle, 1975 – United States
- Aliatypus torridus Coyle, 1975 – United States
- Aliatypus trophonius Coyle, 1975 – United States
