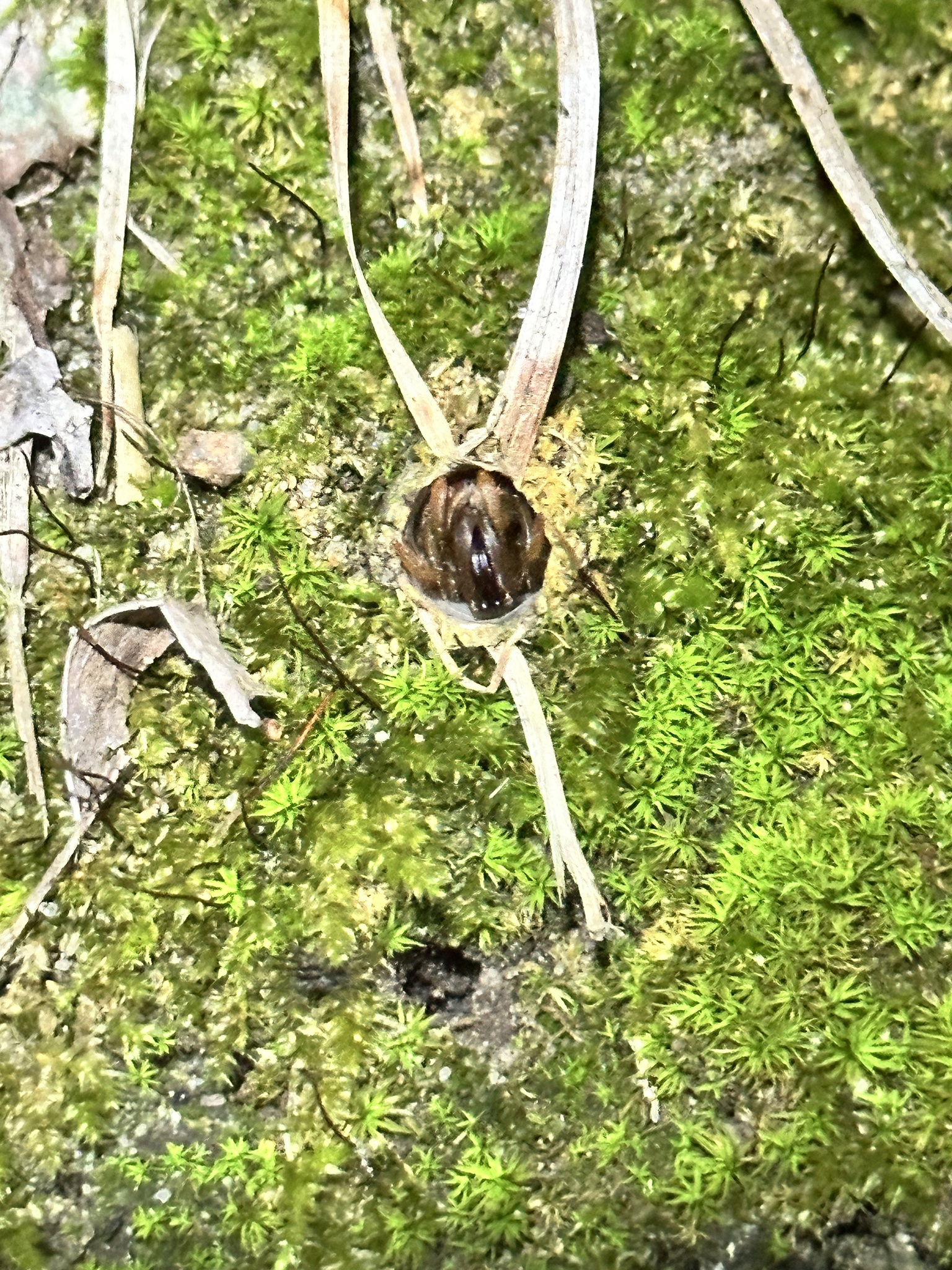
- C. signata in burrow (Japan)
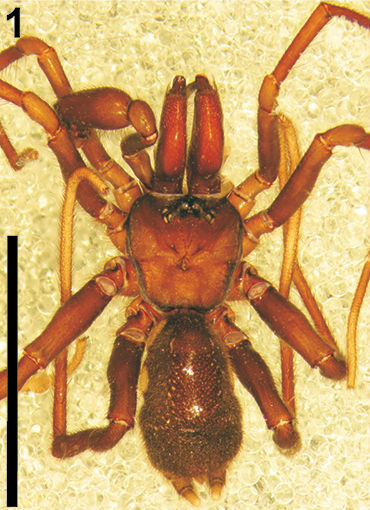
- C. megae

Scientific classification
- Kingdom: Animalia
- Phylum: Arthropoda
- Subphylum: Chelicerata
- Class: Arachnida
- Order: Araneae
- Infraorder: Mygalomorphae
- Family: Atypidae
- Genus: Calommata; Lucas, 1837

Type species
- C. fulvipes (Lucas, 1835)

Species
- 16, see text

= Calommata =

Genus of spiders

Calommata is a genus of purseweb spiders first described by Hippolyte Lucas in 1837.

== Description ==
The carapace is glabrous and yellowish brown with darker stains on the cephalic region. The cephalic region is strongly arched, and the fovea is deep and bipartite. Eight eyes are situated on a compact transverse tubercle near the fovea.

The opisthosoma is dull greyish brown to yellowish brown with an irregularly shaped dorsal sclerite. The legs are pale yellowish brown, with leg I greatly reduced in size, especially the femur in females. Males have longer and more slender legs than females. The legs lack spines but have small spinules, and the tarsal claws are raised on a common process. Female pedipalps have the tibiae and tarsi slightly flattened.

== Behavior and ecology ==
Calommata species construct silk-lined burrows 25-30 cm deep with the top part excavated to form a small surface chamber that is crater-like in shape. Their burrows are slightly raised above the ground and neatly rounded off from the inner rim, gradually sloping outwards and downwards to ground level. The outer surface is covered by earth that resembles the surroundings.

== Distribution and species ==
The genus has a wide distribution across Africa and Asia. The African species were revised by Fourie et al. (2011).

== Species ==
As of September 2025 it contains sixteen species:

- Calommata fulvipes (Lucas, 1835) (type) – Indonesia (Java, Sumatra)
- Calommata hangzhica F. Li & Xu, 2022 – China
- Calommata jinggangica F. Li & Xu, 2022 – China
- Calommata megae Fourie, Haddad & Jocqué, 2011 – Zimbabwe
- Calommata meridionalis Fourie, Haddad & Jocqué, 2011 – South Africa
- Calommata namibica Fourie, Haddad & Jocqué, 2011 – Namibia
- Calommata obesa Simon, 1886 – Thailand
- Calommata pichoni Schenkel, 1963 – China
- Calommata signata Karsch, 1879 – China, Korea, Japan
- Calommata simoni Pocock, 1903 – West, Central, East Africa
- Calommata sundaica (Doleschall, 1859) – Indonesia (Java, Sumatra), Israel
- Calommata tamdaoensis Zha, Pham & Li, 2012 – Vietnam
- Calommata tibialis Fourie, Haddad & Jocqué, 2011 – Ivory Coast, Togo
- Calommata transvaalica (Hewitt, 1916) – South Africa
- Calommata truculenta (Thorell, 1887) – Myanmar
- Calommata yuanjiangica F. Li & Xu, 2022 – China
