= Helvibis longicauda =

Scientific classification
- Domain: Eukaryota
- Kingdom: Animalia
- Phylum: Arthropoda
- Subphylum: Chelicerata
- Class: Arachnida
- Order: Araneae
- Infraorder: Araneomorphae
- Family: Theridiidae
- Genus: Helvibis
- Species: H. longicauda

Binomial name
- Helvibis longicauda Keyserling, 1891

Species of spider

Helvibis longicauda is a species of comb-footed spider in the family Theridiidae. It is found in Brazil.
