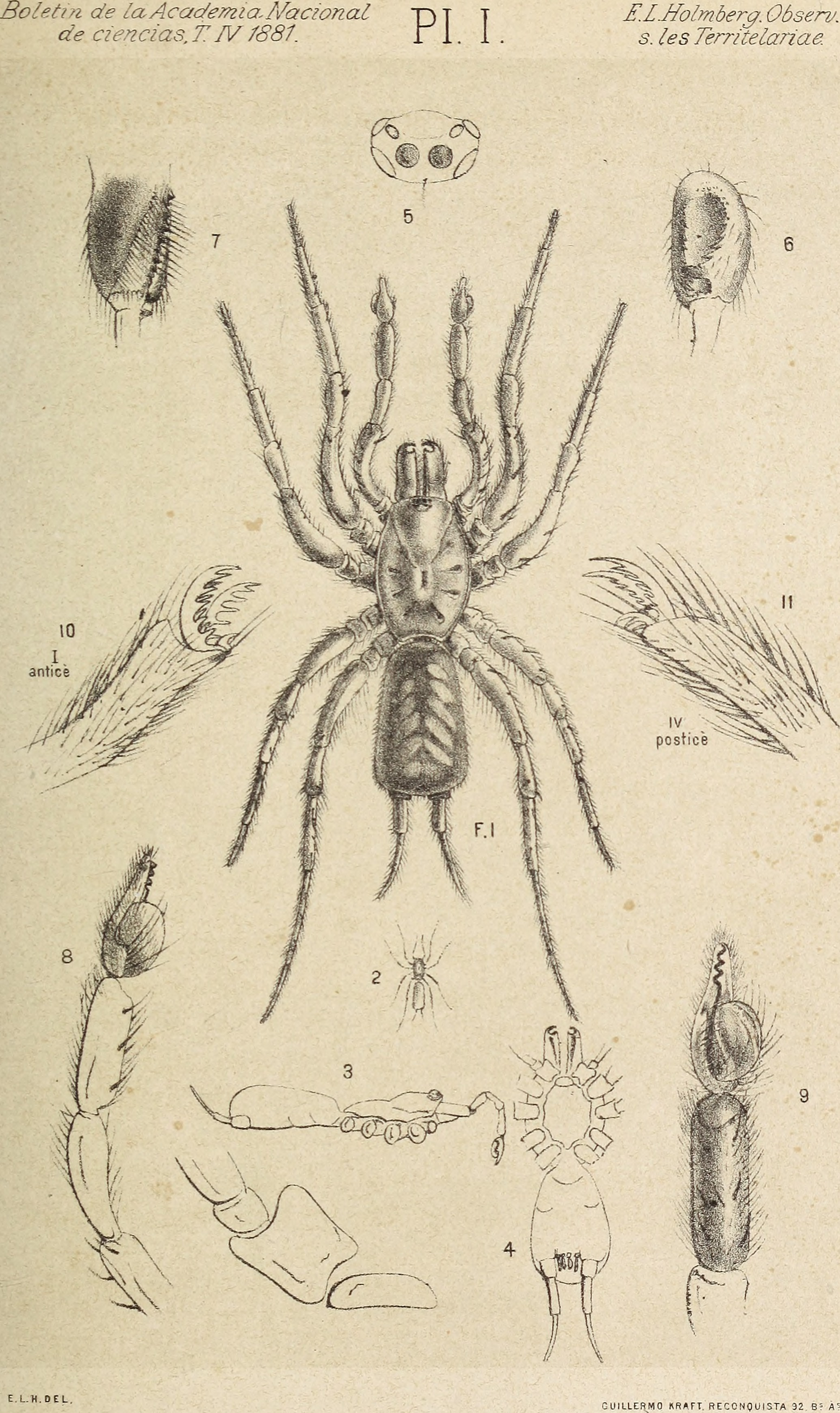

Scientific classification
- Kingdom: Animalia
- Phylum: Arthropoda
- Subphylum: Chelicerata
- Class: Arachnida
- Order: Araneae
- Infraorder: Mygalomorphae
- Family: Mecicobothriidae
- Genus: Mecicobothrium
- Species: M. thorelli

Binomial name
- Mecicobothrium thorelli Holmberg, 1882

= Mecicobothrium thorelli =

Species of spider

Mecicobothrium thorelli is a spider in the family Mecicobothriidae, native to Argentina and Uruguay. It was first described in 1882 by Holmberg. The specific name thorelli honours Tamerlan Thorell. The species is most abundant in autumn and winter.
