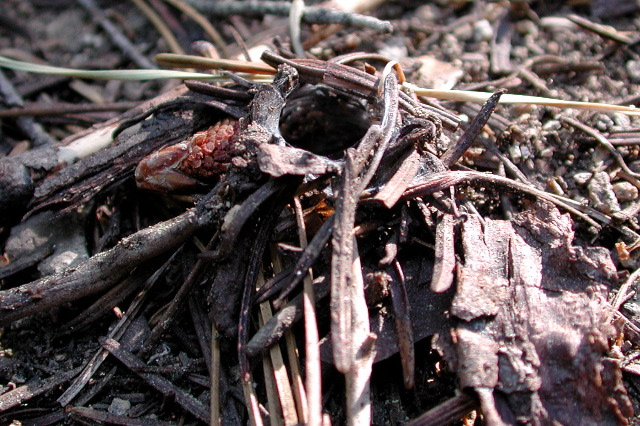
- Atypoides riversi turret

Scientific classification
- Domain: Eukaryota
- Kingdom: Animalia
- Phylum: Arthropoda
- Subphylum: Chelicerata
- Class: Arachnida
- Order: Araneae
- Infraorder: Mygalomorphae
- Family: Antrodiaetidae
- Genus: Atypoides
- Species: A. riversi

Binomial name
- Atypoides riversi O. Pickard-Cambridge, 1883

Synonyms
- Antrodiaetus riversi (O. Pickard-Cambridge, 1883)

= Atypoides riversi =

Species of spider

Atypoides riversi, known as turret spider, is a species of mygalomorph spider in the family Antrodiaetidae. It is a medium-sized spider native to Northern California that constructs a burrow with a turret made of soil, vegetation and silk. This spider's length is 13 to 18 millimetres (0.51 to 0.71 in) long, though females are larger than males.

== Gallery ==
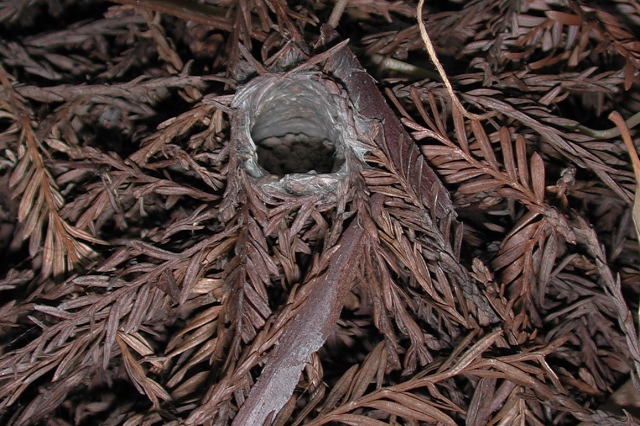
Plugged turret in northern California

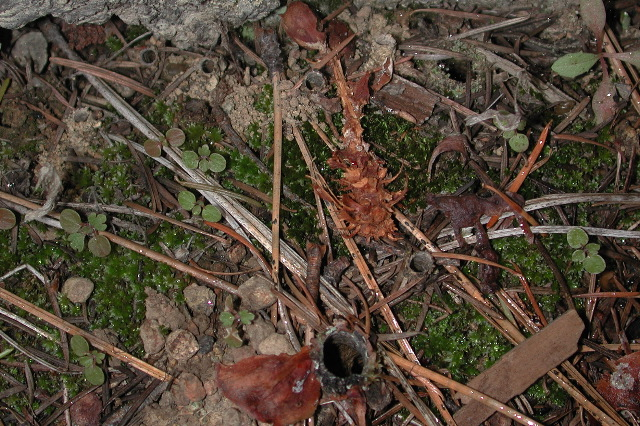
Turret, with spiderling turrets, northern California.
