= Tamerlan Thorell =

Swedish arachnologist

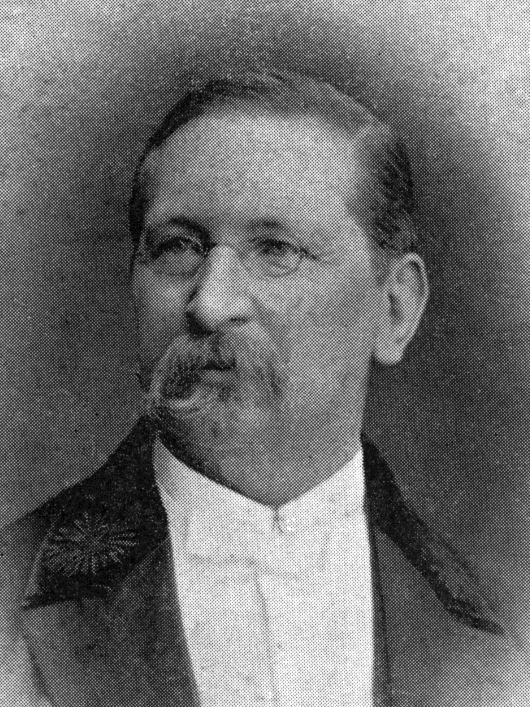
Tord Tamerlan Teodor Thorell

Tord Tamerlan Teodor Thorell (3 May 1830 – 22 December 1901) was a Swedish arachnologist.

Thorell studied spiders with Giacomo Doria at the Museo Civico di Storia Naturale de Genoa. He corresponded with other arachnologists, such as Octavius Pickard-Cambridge, Eugène Simon and Thomas Workman.

He described more than 1,000 spider species during his time from the 1850s to 1900.

Thorell wrote: On European Spiders (1869) and Synonym of European Spiders (1870-73).

== Taxonomic honors ==
The Orb-weaver spider genus Thorellina and the jumping spider genus Thorelliola are named after him, as well as about 30 species of spiders:

- Araneus thorelli (Roewer, 1942) (Myanmar) (Araneidae)
- Gasteracantha thorelli Keyserling, 1864 (Madagascar) (Araneidae)
- Leviellus thorelli (Ausserer, 1871) (Europe) (Araneidae)
- Mandjelia thorelli (Raven, 1990) (Queensland) (Barychelidae)
- Clubiona thorelli Roewer, 1951 (Sumatra) (Clubionidae)
- Malamatidia thorelli Deeleman-Reinhold, 2001 (Sulawesi) (Clubionidae)
- Corinnomma thorelli Simon, 1905 (Java) (Corinnidae)
- Ctenus thorelli F. O. P.-Cambridge, 1897 (Sri Lanka) (Ctenidae)
- Zelotes thorelli Simon, 1914 (Southern Europe) (Gnaphosidae)
- Hypochilus thorelli Marx, 1888 (USA) (Hypochilidae)
- Idiops thorelli O. P.-Cambridge, 1870 (South Africa) (Idiopidae)
- Trichopterna thorelli (Westring, 1861) (Palearctic) (Linyphiidae)
- Lycosa thorelli (Keyserling, 1877) (Colombia to Argentina) (Lycosidae)
- Lycosula thorelli (Berland, 1929) (Samoa, Marquesas Is.) (Lycosidae)
- Pardosa thorelli (Collett, 1876) (Norway) (Lycosidae)
- Mecicobothrium thorelli Holmberg, 1882 (Argentina, Uruguay) (Mecicobothriidae)
- Miturga thorelli Simon, 1909 (Western Australia) (Miturgidae)
- Spermophora thorelli Roewer, 1942 (Myanmar) (Pholcidae)
- Cispius thorelli Blandin, 1978 (Congo) (Pisauridae)
- Bavia thorelli Simon, 1901 (Sulawesi) (Salticidae)
- Pancorius thorelli (Simon, 1899) (Sumatra) (Salticidae)
- Talavera thorelli (Kulczyn'ski, 1891) (Palearctic) (Salticidae)
- Pseudopoda thorelli Jäger, 2001 (Myanmar) (Sparassidae)
- Afroblemma thorelli (Brignoli, 1974) (Angola, Tanzania) (Tetrablemmidae)
- Mesida thorelli (Blackwall, 1877) (Seychelles) (Tetragnathidae)
- Chilobrachys thorelli Pocock, 1900 (India) (Theraphosidae)
- Cyriopagopus thorelli (Simon, 1901) (Malaysia) (Theraphosidae)
- Helvibis thorelli Keyserling, 1884 (Peru, Brazil) (Theridiidae)
- Theridion thorelli L. Koch, 1865 (New South Wales) (Theridiidae)
- Tmarus thorelli Comellini, 1955 (Congo) (Thomisidae)

== Works ==
- 1856: Recensio critica aranearum suecicarum quas descripserunt Clerckius, Linnaeus, de Geerus. N. Act. reg. Soc. sci. Upsal. (3) 2(1): 61-176.
- 1858: Om Clercks original-spindelsammlung. Öfvers. Kongl. vet. Akad. Förh. 15: 143–154.
- 1858: Till kännedomen om slägten a Mithras och Uloborus. Öfvers. Kongl. vet. Akad. Förh. 15: 191–205.
- 1859: Nya exotiska Epeirider. Öfvers. Kongl. vet. Akad. Förh. 16: 299–304.
- 1868: Arachnida. In Eisen, G. & A. Stuxberg, Bidrag till kännedomen om Gotska-Sandön. Öfvers. Kongl. vet. Akad. Förh. 25: 379.
- 1868: Araneae. Species novae minusve cognitae. In Virgin, C. A., Kongliga Svenska Fregatten Eugenies Resa omkring Jorden. Uppsala, Zoologi, Arachnida, pp. 1–34.
- 1869: On European spiders. Part I. Review of the European genera of spiders, preceded by some observations on zoological nomenclature. Nova Acta reg. Soc. sci. Upsaliae (3) 7: 1–108.
- 1870: Remarks on synonyms of European spiders. Part I. Uppsala, pp. 1–96.
- 1870: On European spiders. Nov. Act. reg. Soc. sci. Upsaline (3) 7: 109–242.
- 1870: Araneae nonnullae Novae Hollandie, descriptae. Öfvers. Kongl. vet. Akad. Förh. 27: 367–389.
- 1871: Remarks on synonyms of European spiders. Part II. Uppsala, pp. 97–228.
- 1871: Om Arachnider fran Spitsbergin och Beeren-Eiland. Öfvers. Kongl. vet. Akad. Förh. 28: 683-702
- 1872: Remarks on synonyms of European spiders. Part III. Upsala, pp. 229–374.
- 1872: Om några Arachnider från Grönland. Öfvers. Kongl. vet. Akad. Förh. 29: 147–166.
- 1873: Remarks on synonyms of European spiders. Part IV. Uppsala, pp. 375–645.
- 1875: Diagnoses Aranearum Europaearum aliquot novarum. Tijdschr. Ent. 18: 81-108.
- 1875: Verzeichniss südrussischer Spinnen. Horae Soc. ent. Ross. 11: 39-122.
- 1875: Descriptions of several European and North African spiders. Kongl. Svenska. Vet.-Akad. Handl. 13(5): 1–203.
- 1875: Notice of some spiders from Labrador. Proc. Boston Soc. nat. Hist. 17: 490–504.
- 1875: On some spiders from New-Caledonia, Madagascar and Réunion. Proc. zool. Soc. Lond. 1875: 130–149.
- 1877: Due ragni esotici descritti. Ann. Mus. civ. stor. nat. Genova 9: 301–310.
- 1877: Studi sui Ragni Malesi e Papuani. I. Ragni di Selebes raccolti nel 1874 dal Dott. O. Beccari. Ann. Mus. civ. stor. nat. Genova 10: 341–637.
- 1877: Descriptions of the Araneae collected in Colorado in 1875, by A. S. Packard jun., M.D. Bull. U. S. geol. Surv. 3: 477–529.
- 1878: Notice of the spiders of the 'Polaris' expedition. Amer. Natural. 12: 393–396.
- 1878: Studi sui ragni Malesi e Papuani. II. Ragni di Amboina raccolti Prof. O. Beccari. Ann. Mus. civ. stor. nat. Genova 13: 1–317.
- 1881: Studi sui Ragni Malesi e Papuani. III. Ragni dell'Austro Malesia e del Capo York, conservati nel Museo civico di storia naturale di Genova. Ann. Mus. civ. stor. nat. Genova 17: 1–727.
- 1887: Viaggio di L. Fea in Birmania e regioni vicine. II. Primo saggio sui ragni birmani. Ann. Mus. civ. stor. nat. Genova 25: 5–417.
- 1890: Studi sui ragni Malesi e Papuani. IV, 1. Ann. Mus. civ. stor. nat. Genova 28: 1–419.
- 1890: Aracnidi di Nias e di Sumatra raccolti nel 1886 dal Sig. E. Modigliani. Ann. Mus. civ. stor. nat. Genova 30: 5–106.
- 1890: Diagnoses aranearum aliquot novarum in Indo-Malesia inventarum. Ann. Mus. civ. stor. nat. Genova 30: 132–172.
- 1890: Arachnidi di Pinang raccolti nel 1889 dai Signori L. Loria e L. Fea. Ann. Mus. civ. stor. nat. Genova 30: 269–383.
- 1891: Spindlar från Nikobarerna och andra delar af södra Asien. Kongl. Svenska. Vet.-Acad. Handl. 24(2): 1–149.
- 1892: Novae species aranearum a Cel. Th. Workman in ins. Singapore collectae. Boll. Soc. ent. ital. 24: 209–252.
- 1892: On some spiders from the Andaman Islands, collected by E. W. Oates, Esq. Ann. Mag. nat. Hist. (6) 9: 226–237.
- 1892: Studi sui ragni Malesi e Papuani. IV, 2. Ann. Mus. civ. stor. nat. Genova 31: 1–490.
- 1894: Förteckning öfver arachnider från Java och närgrändsande öar, insamlade af Carl Aurivillius; jemte beskrifningar å några sydasiatiska och sydamerikanska spindlar. Bih. Svenska. Vet.-Akad. Handl. 20(4): 1-63.
- 1894: Decas aranearum in ins. Singapore a Cel. Th. Workman inventarum. Boll. Soc. ent. ital. 26: 321–355.
- 1895: Descriptive catalogue of the spiders of Burma
- 1897, with J. Castelnau: Notes sur Hyptiotes anceps. Feuille jeun. Natural. 27: 107–111.
- 1897: Viaggio di Leonardo Fea in Birmania e regioni vicine. LXXIII. Secondo saggio sui Ragni birmani. I. Parallelodontes. Tubitelariae. Ann. Mus. civ. stor. nat. Genova (2) 17[=37]: 161–267.
- 1897: Araneae paucae Asiae australis. Bih. Svenska. Vet.-Akad. Handl. 22(6): 1-36.
- 1898: Viaggio di Leonardo Fea in Birmania e regioni vicine. LXXX. Secondo saggio sui Ragni birmani. II. Retitelariae et Orbitelariae. Ann. Mus. civ. stor. nat. Genova (2) 19[=39]: 271–378.
- 1899: Araneae Camerunenses (Africae occidentalis) quas anno 1891 collegerunt Cel. Dr Y. Sjöstedt aliique. Bih. Svenska. Vet.-Akad. Handl. 25(1): 1–105.
