= Hexurella rupicola =

Scientific classification
- Kingdom: Animalia
- Phylum: Arthropoda
- Subphylum: Chelicerata
- Class: Arachnida
- Order: Araneae
- Infraorder: Mygalomorphae
- Family: Hexurellidae
- Genus: Hexurella
- Species: H. rupicola

Binomial name
- Hexurella rupicola Gertsch & Platnick, 1979

Species of spider

Hexurella rupicola is a species of spider native to the United States. It was first described by Gertsch and Platnick in 1979. It is from the family Hexurellidae.
