= Helvibis infelix =

Scientific classification
- Domain: Eukaryota
- Kingdom: Animalia
- Phylum: Arthropoda
- Subphylum: Chelicerata
- Class: Arachnida
- Order: Araneae
- Infraorder: Araneomorphae
- Family: Theridiidae
- Genus: Helvibis
- Species: H. infelix

Binomial name
- Helvibis infelix (O. Pickard-Cambridge, 1880)

Species of spider

Helvibis infelix is a species of comb-footed spider in the family Theridiidae. It is found in Brazil.
