= Helvibis germaini =

Scientific classification
- Kingdom: Animalia
- Phylum: Arthropoda
- Subphylum: Chelicerata
- Class: Arachnida
- Order: Araneae
- Infraorder: Araneomorphae
- Family: Theridiidae
- Genus: Helvibis
- Species: H. germaini

Binomial name
- Helvibis germaini (Simon, 1895)

Species of spider

Helvibis germaini is a species of comb-footed spider in the family Theridiidae. It is found in Brazil and Peru.
