= Calommata transvaalica =

Transvaal's African purse-web spider

Conservation status
- Vulnerable (SANBI Red List)

Scientific classification
- Kingdom: Animalia
- Phylum: Arthropoda
- Subphylum: Chelicerata
- Class: Arachnida
- Order: Araneae
- Infraorder: Mygalomorphae
- Family: Atypidae
- Genus: Calommata
- Species: C. transvaalica

Binomial name
- Calommata transvaalica Hewitt, 1916

Species of spider

Calommata transvaalica is a species of spider in the genus Calommata of the family Atypidae. It is endemic to South Africa, where it is commonly known as Transvaal's African purse-web spider.

== Distribution ==
Calommata transvaalica is known from Gauteng and Limpopo provinces in South Africa. In Gauteng, it has been recorded from Hatfield (Pretoria), Roodeplaatdam Nature Reserve, Groenkloof Nature Reserve, and Zwartkoppies near Pretoria. In Limpopo, it occurs in the Blouberg Nature Reserve and the Soutpansberg mountains.

== Habitat and ecology ==
This species is a free-living burrow dweller found in both the Savanna and Grassland Biome of South Africa. Females were historically sampled by hand at Roodeplaat Dam near Pretoria, where their burrows were described as having an entrance slightly raised above the ground. From the inner rim, the burrow is neatly rounded off, gradually sloping outwards and downwards to ground level, with the outer surface covered with earth resembling the surroundings. The interior is lined with loose, highly adhesive silky webbing that may provide protection against intruders. The burrows reach depths of 22–25 cm.

Males are collected in pitfall traps during spring and early summer (September to early December, October to January) during the mating season as they move around searching for females.

== Conservation status ==
Calommata transvaalica is listed as Vulnerable under the B criterion by the South African National Biodiversity Institute (SANBI). Described in 1916 from Roodeplaat, it is found at elevations of 908-1472 meters above sea level. Despite several surveys, it has not been found in intervening areas between known localities. The female was last sampled in 1915, and the species is suspected to occur at fewer than 10 locations.

Parts of its habitat have been lost in Gauteng due to crop cultivation and urban development. The species is protected in Roodeplaatdam Nature Reserve, Groenkloof Nature Reserve, and Blouberg Nature Reserve. It is threatened by historical and continuing urban development and crop cultivation around Gauteng, and is potentially threatened by mining on the northern side of the Soutpansberg.

== Description ==
Calommata transvaalica is known from both sexes. Like other members of the genus, it displays the characteristic features of Atypidae, including the distinctive burrow construction and the typical mygalomorph body plan with reduced first legs.
