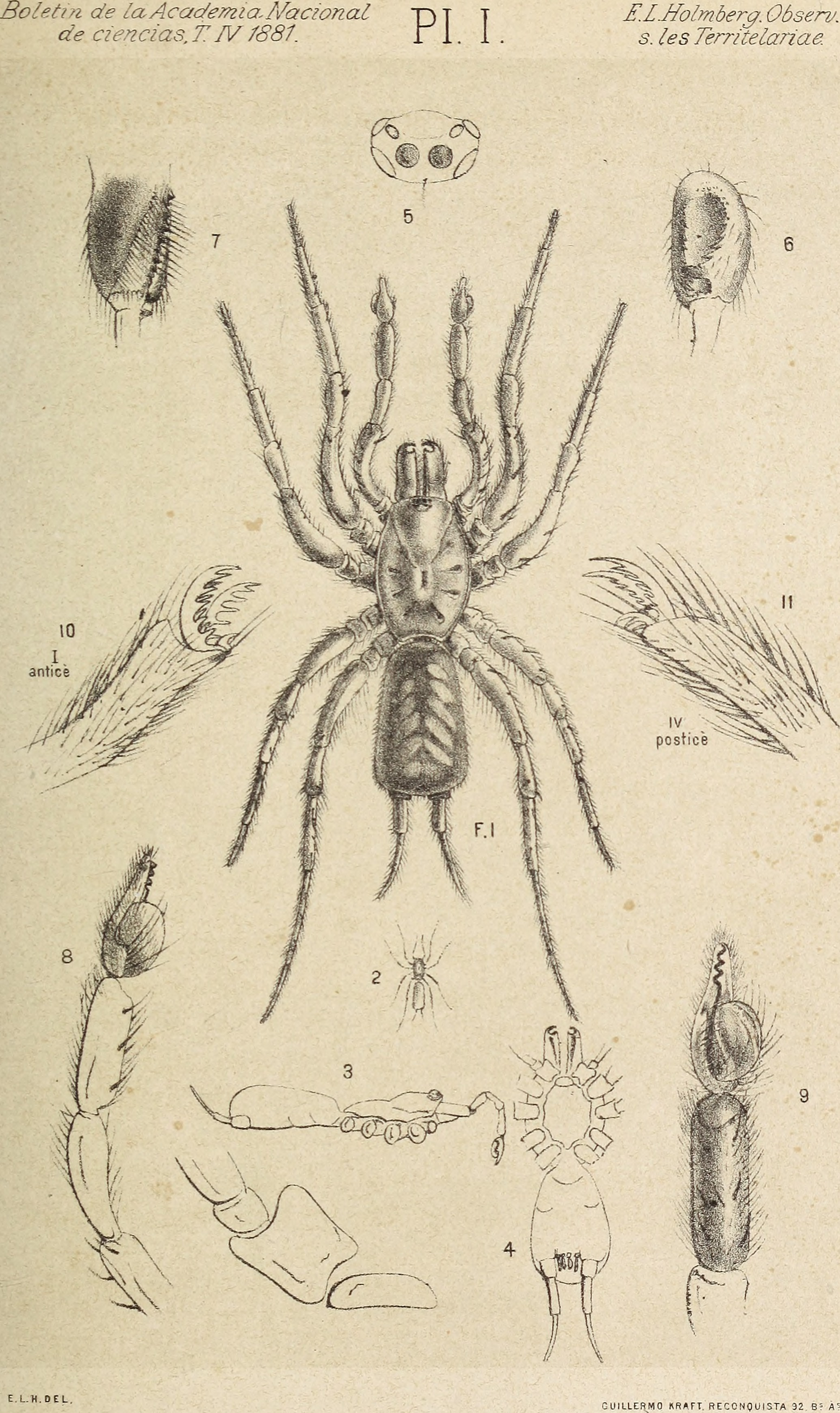
- Illustration of Mecicobothrium thorelli

Scientific classification
- Kingdom: Animalia
- Phylum: Arthropoda
- Subphylum: Chelicerata
- Class: Arachnida
- Order: Araneae
- Infraorder: Mygalomorphae
- Clade: Atypoidea
- Family: Mecicobothriidae; Holmberg, 1882
- blue: reported countries (WSC)

= Dwarf tarantula =

Dwarf tarantula Temporal range: Cretaceous–present

Spiders of the family Mecicobothriidae

Dwarf tarantulas, also known as sheet funnel-web spiders, are a type of spider from the family Mecicobothriidae. Dwarf tarantulas are one of several families of the suborder Mygalomorphae; this larger group also includes the true tarantulas.

== Description ==
Dwarf tarantulas, as the name indicates, appear very similar to tarantulas, but are physically much smaller. Many specimens are smaller than 1 cm in length, and the largest in the family are rarely bigger than 2 cm. The spiders, like all Mygalomorphae, have downward pointing fangs; dwarf tarantulas also have long spinnerets.

== Genera ==
As of January 2026, this family includes one genus and two species:

Mecicobothrium Holmberg, 1882

- Mecicobothrium baccai Lucas et al., 2006 – Brazil
- Mecicobothrium thorelli Holmberg, 1882 – Argentina, Uruguay

Genera moved to other families include:

- Hexura Simon, 1884 → Antrodiaetidae
- Hexurella Gertsch & Platnick, 1979 → Hexurellidae
- Megahexura Kaston, 1972 → Megahexuridae

== See also ==
- Spider families
