= Helvibis longistyla =

Scientific classification
- Domain: Eukaryota
- Kingdom: Animalia
- Phylum: Arthropoda
- Subphylum: Chelicerata
- Class: Arachnida
- Order: Araneae
- Infraorder: Araneomorphae
- Family: Theridiidae
- Genus: Helvibis
- Species: H. longistyla

Binomial name
- Helvibis longistyla (F.O. Pickard-Cambridge, 1902)

Species of spider

Helvibis longistyla is a species of comb-footed spider in the family Theridiidae. It is found in Panama and Trinidad.
