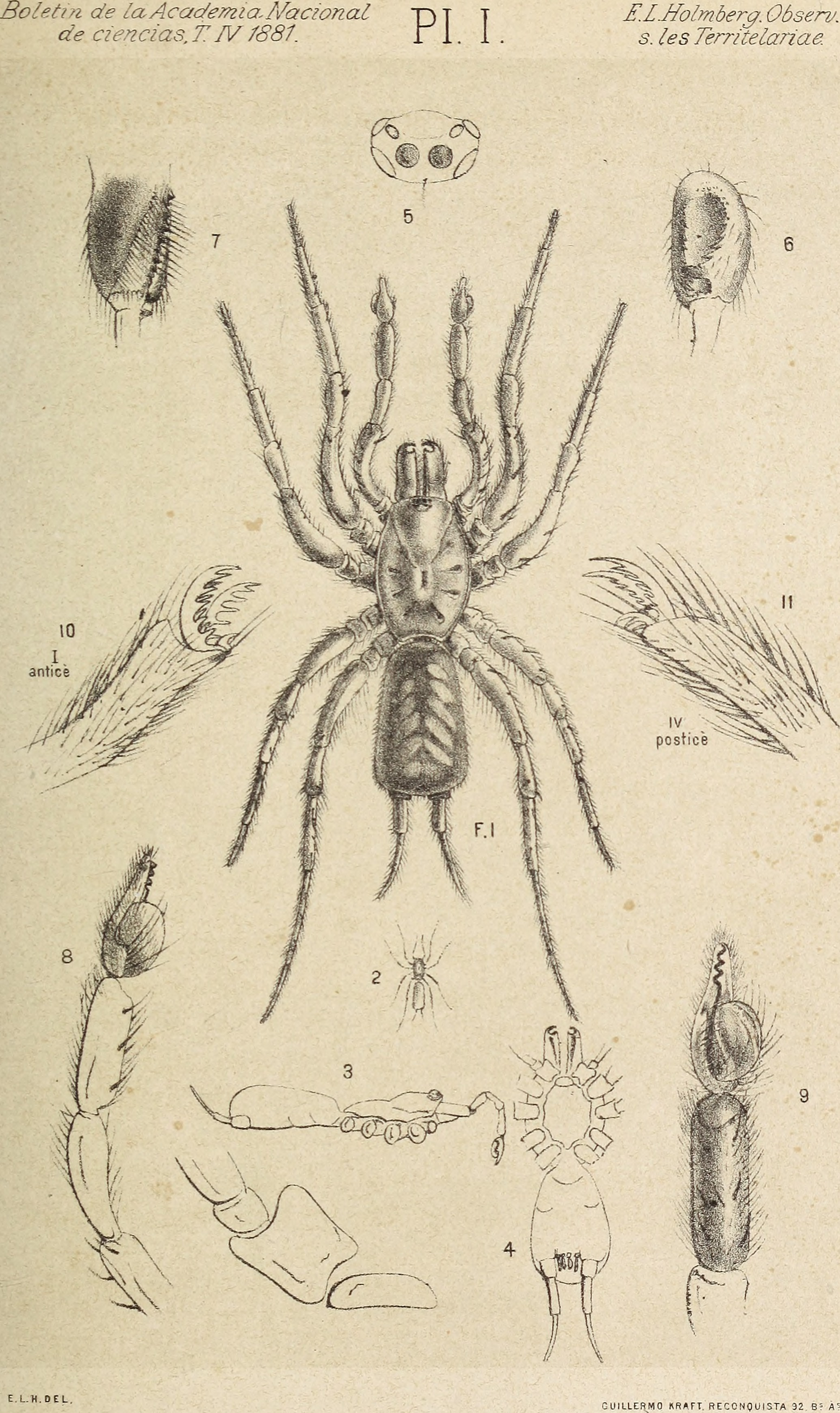
- M. thorelli

Scientific classification
- Domain: Eukaryota
- Kingdom: Animalia
- Phylum: Arthropoda
- Subphylum: Chelicerata
- Class: Arachnida
- Order: Araneae
- Infraorder: Mygalomorphae
- Family: Mecicobothriidae
- Genus: Mecicobothrium; Holmberg

Species
- See text.

= Mecicobothrium =

Genus of spiders

Mecicobothrium is a genus of dwarf tarantulas first described by Eduardo Ladislao Holmberg in 1882.

These spiders have three tarsal claws. The cephalic groove (fovea) is longitudinal. The abdomen has plates. The male palpal bulb lies in a long modified final joint. The posterior lateral spinnerets are very long, with the last joint whiplike.

== Species ==
As of July 2020, the genus contained only two species:

- Mecicobothrium baccai Lucas et al., 2006 — Brazil
- Mecicobothrium thorelli Holmberg, 1882 — Argentina, Uruguay
