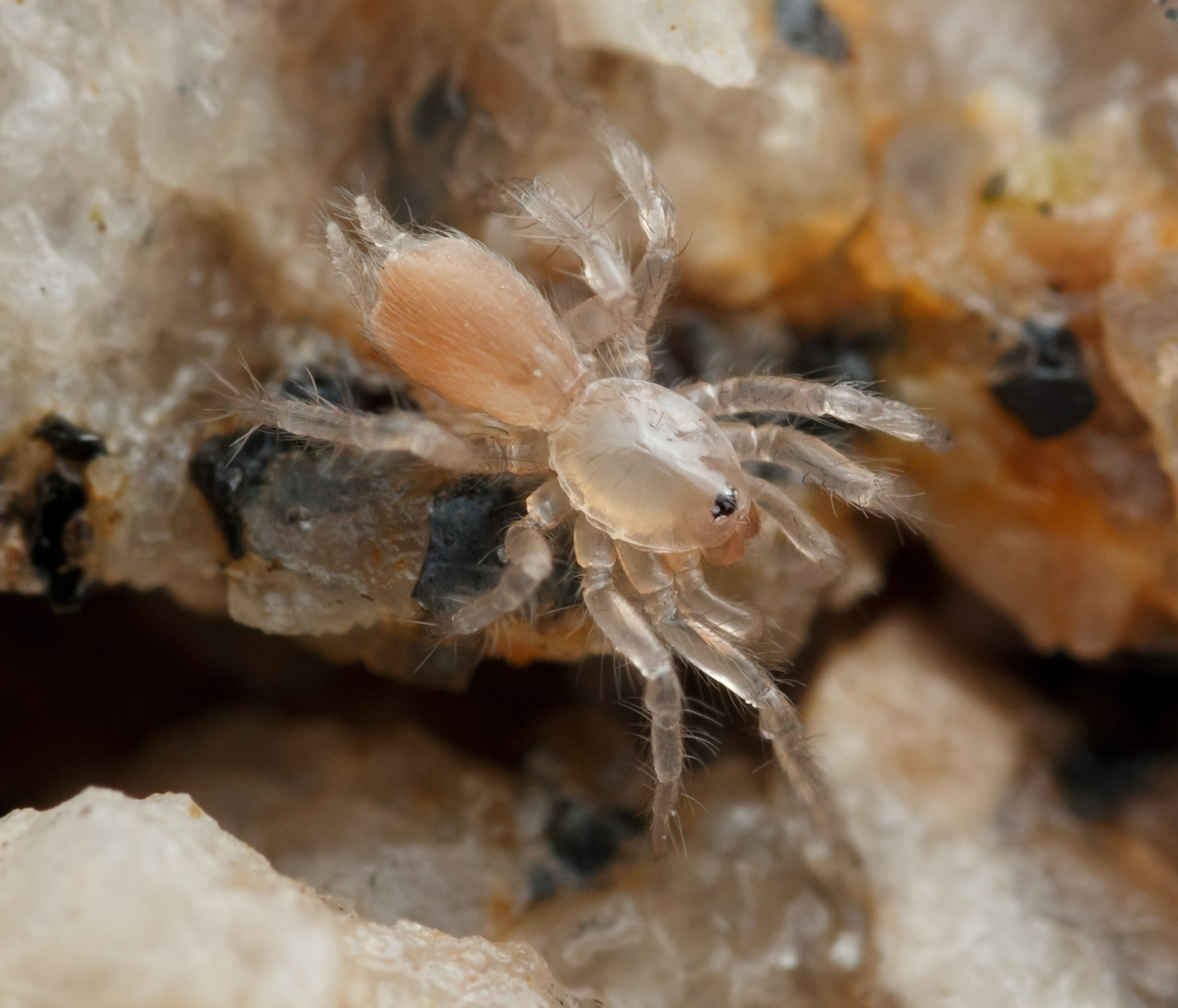
- H. ephedra

Scientific classification
- Kingdom: Animalia
- Phylum: Arthropoda
- Subphylum: Chelicerata
- Class: Arachnida
- Order: Araneae
- Infraorder: Mygalomorphae
- Clade: Atypoidea
- Family: Hexurellidae; Hedin & Bond, 2019
- Genus: Hexurella; Gertsch & Platnick, 1979
- blue: reported countries (WSC)

= Hexurella =

Genus of American spiders

Hexurella is a genus of spiders, found in the United States and Mexico. It is the only genus in the family Hexurellidae.

== Species ==
As of January 2026, this genus includes eight species:

- Hexurella apachea Gertsch & Platnick, 1979 – United States
- Hexurella encina Gertsch & Platnick, 1979 – Mexico
- Hexurella ephedra Monjaraz-Ruedas, Mendez & Hedin, 2023 – United States
- Hexurella pinea Gertsch & Platnick, 1979 – United States
- Hexurella rupicola Gertsch & Platnick, 1979 – United States
- Hexurella uwiiltil Monjaraz-Ruedas, Mendez & Hedin, 2023 – Mexico
- Hexurella xerica Monjaraz-Ruedas, Mendez & Hedin, 2023 – United States
- Hexurella zas Monjaraz-Ruedas, Mendez & Hedin, 2023 – United States
