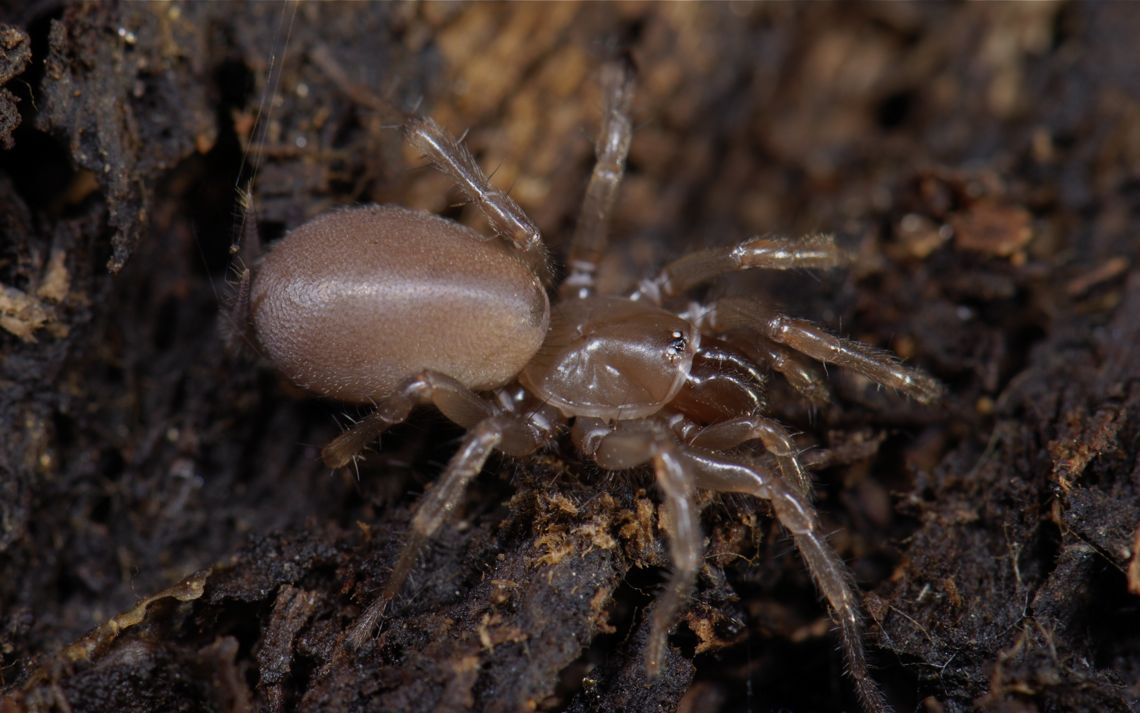
- Megahexura fulva in Sierra de Salinas

Scientific classification
- Kingdom: Animalia
- Phylum: Arthropoda
- Subphylum: Chelicerata
- Class: Arachnida
- Order: Araneae
- Infraorder: Mygalomorphae
- Clade: Atypoidea
- Family: Megahexuridae; Hedin & Bond, 2019
- Genus: Megahexura; Kaston, 1972
- Species: M. fulva

Binomial name
- Megahexura fulva (Chamberlin, 1919)

= Megahexura =

Genus of the spider M. fulva

Megahexura is a genus of spiders with the sole species Megahexura fulva, discovered in 1919. As of January 2026, it is the only genus in the family Megahexuridae.

Native to the United States, more specifically California, the spiders build an exposed sheet web with a funnel-shaped retreat in holes and crevices along ravine banks.
