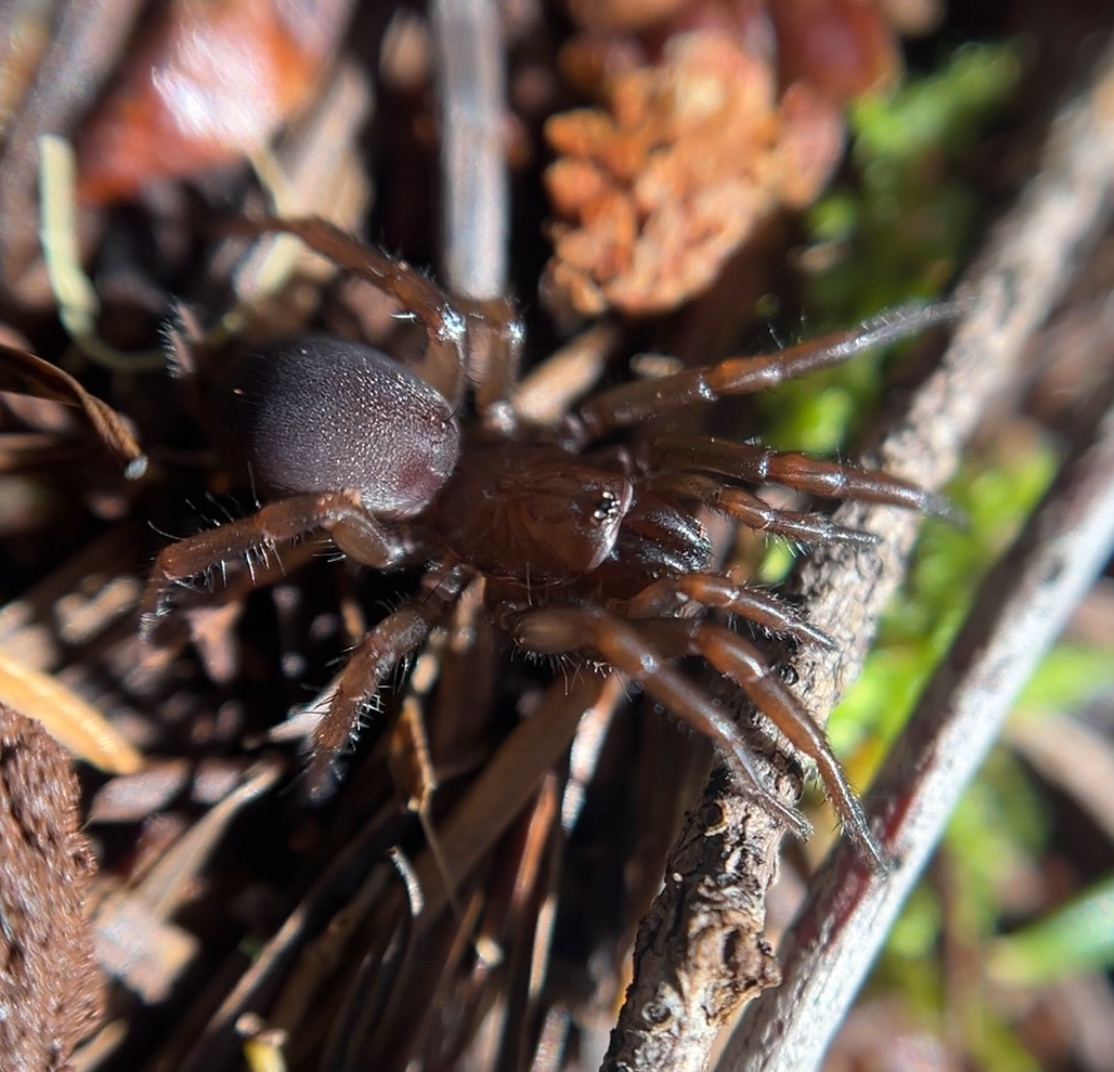
- Hexura picea in Oregon
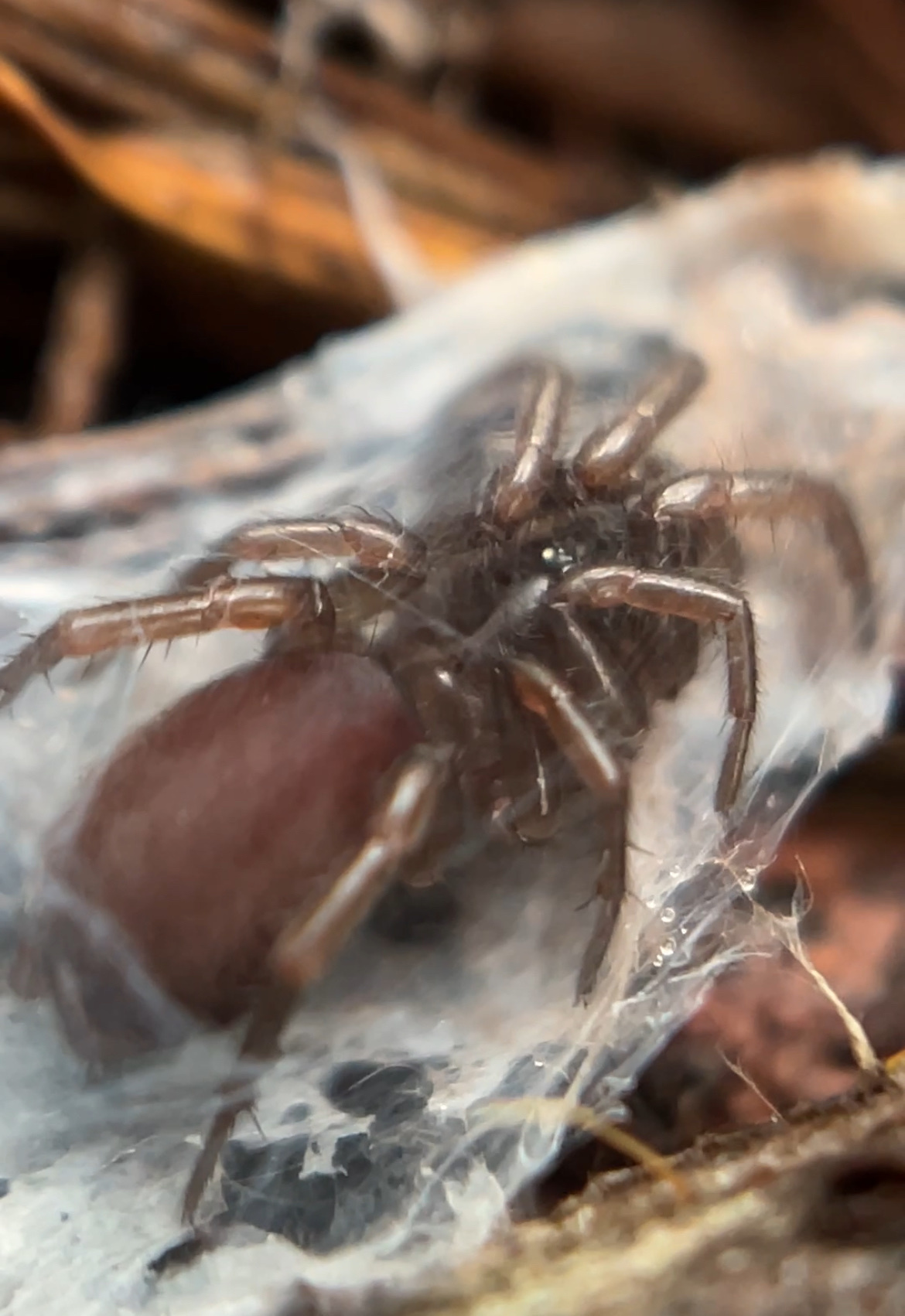
- Hexura rothi in Oregon

Scientific classification
- Kingdom: Animalia
- Phylum: Arthropoda
- Subphylum: Chelicerata
- Class: Arachnida
- Order: Araneae
- Infraorder: Mygalomorphae
- Family: Antrodiaetidae
- Genus: Hexura; Simon, 1884

Type species
- H. picea Simon, 1884

Species
- H. picea Simon, 1884; H. rothi Gertsch & Platnick, 1979; H. vandel Calatayud-Mascarell, Briggs & Hamilton, 2026

= Hexura =

Genus of spiders

Hexura is a genus of folding trapdoor spiders (Antrodiaetidae).

== Distribution ==
Distribution map of the three species of genus Hexura; (blue) H. picea, (Pink) H. rothi and (Yellow) H. vandal.

Members of this genus can be found only along the Pacific Coastal Ranges of the Pacific Northwest (PNW) region and the Cascade Mountains in the United States and Canada. Species of this genus have geographically separated ranges that only overlap in Central Oregon. Their separated ranges are due to mesic conifer forests that they inhabit that were once connected throughout the Pacific Northwest region being split during the formation and progressive xerification of the Columbia Basin from the late Miocene to early Pliocene. This basin presents a significant barrier for many species in the region including the species of this genus.

The northern species Hexura picea has a range that stretches from southern Vancouver Island to central Oregon with the southern species Hexura rothi having a smaller distribution from central to southern Oregon. The third and easternmost species, Hexura vandal, has a very restricted range being found in the Rocky Mountains of Idaho.

Members of Hexura are ground-dwelling opportunistic species that can be found living under objects or in other earthen crevices. They also inhabit mesic conifer forests where they can be found under or inside logs, or in the moss mat microhabitats of these forests. Inside these crevices, they will use their elongated spinnerets to build silken funnel-and-sheet webs.

== Taxonomy ==
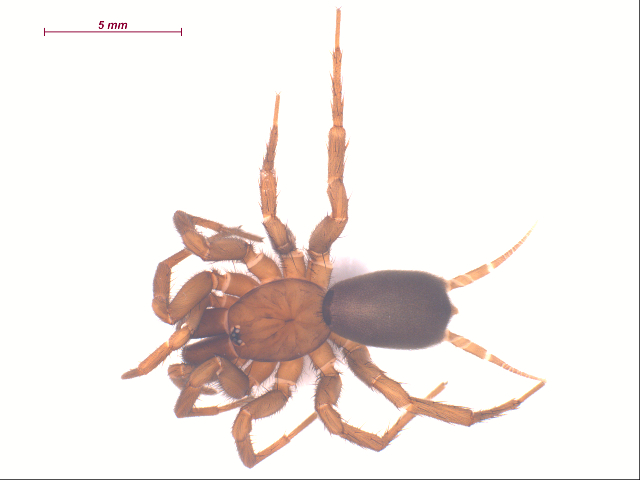
Hexura picea from British Columbia, Canada. 5 mm bar in the upper left corner.

The genus was first described in 1884 by French naturalist Eugène Louis Simon. It was originally placed within the family Mecicobothriidae (dwarf tarantulas) before being moved to the family Antrodiaetidae in 2019.

=== Species ===
As of October 2026, this genus contained three described species. The species of this genus are ancient with their lineages separating from each other around 180-60 million years ago (Jurassic-Paleocene) acting as surviving evolutionary remnants. They are listed below:

- Hexura picea Simon, 1885 – Canada, United States
- Hexura rothi Gertsch & Platnick, 1979 – United States
- Hexura vandal Calatayud-Mascarell, Briggs & Hamilton, 2026 – United States
