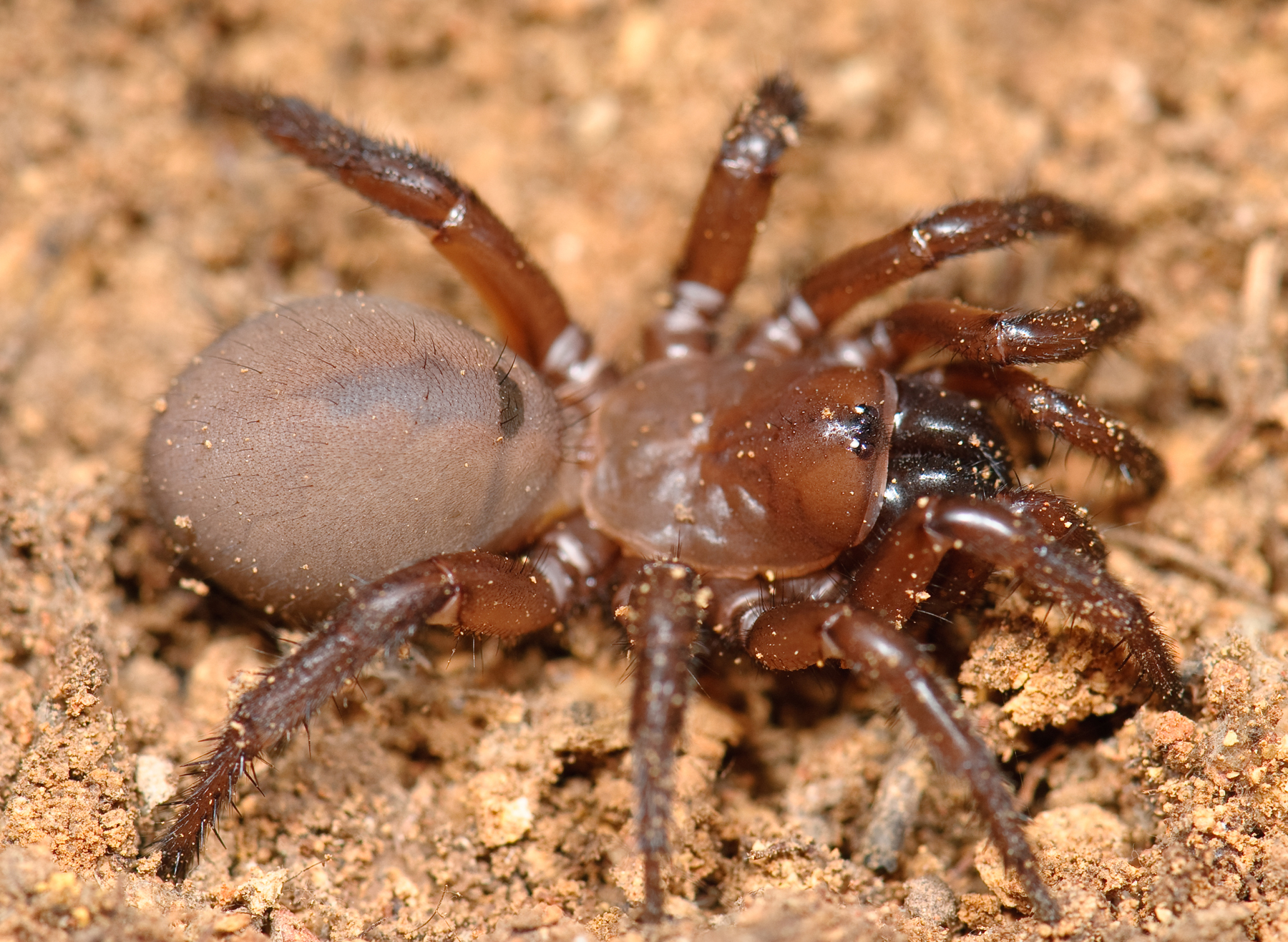
- Female

Scientific classification
- Domain: Eukaryota
- Kingdom: Animalia
- Phylum: Arthropoda
- Subphylum: Chelicerata
- Class: Arachnida
- Order: Araneae
- Infraorder: Mygalomorphae
- Family: Antrodiaetidae
- Genus: Antrodiaetus
- Species: A. unicolor

Binomial name
- Antrodiaetus unicolor (Hentz, 1842)

= Antrodiaetus unicolor =

Species of spider

Antrodiaetus unicolor is a species of folding-door spider in the family Antrodiaetidae. It is found in the United States.
