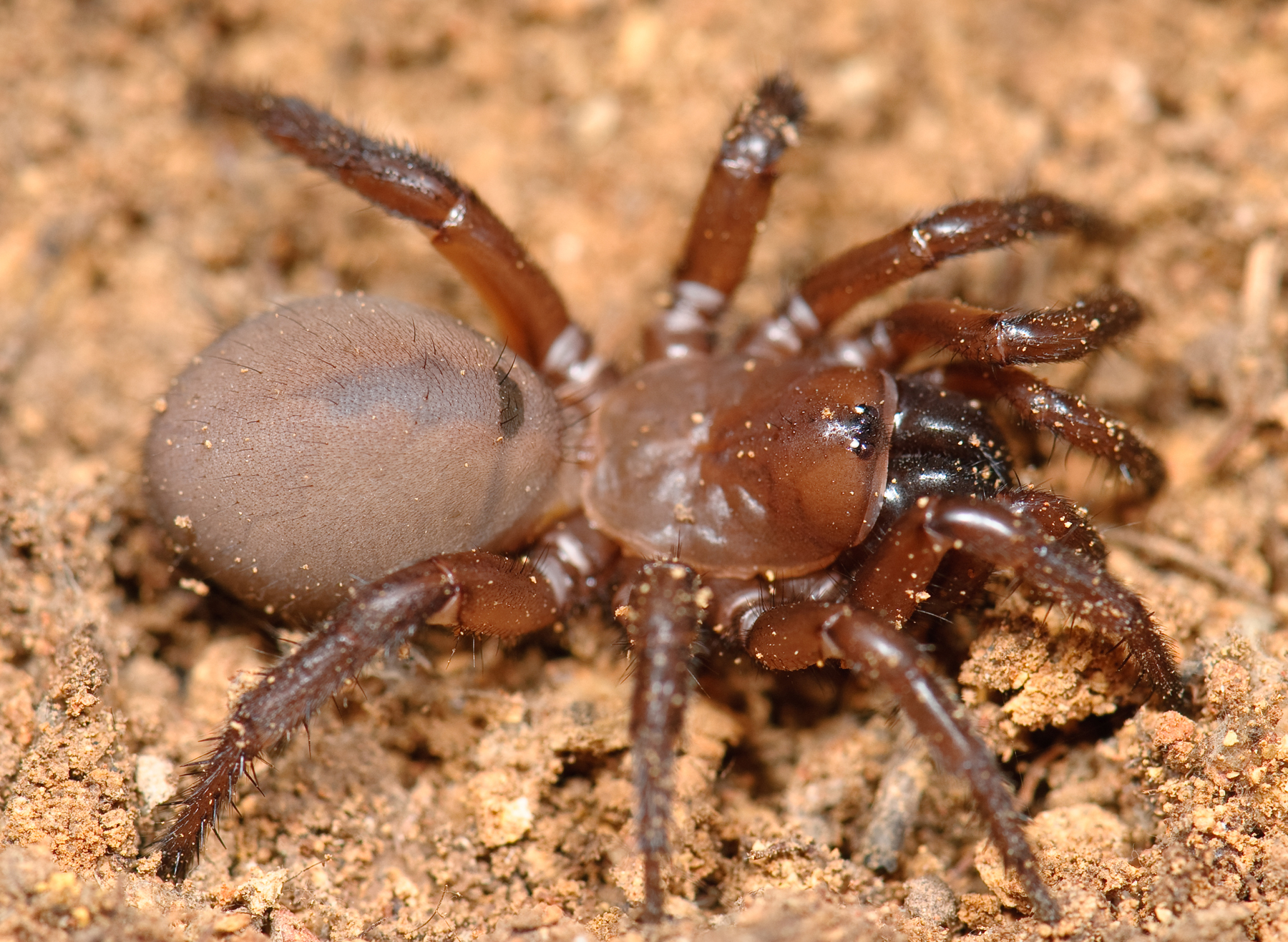
- Female A. unicolor
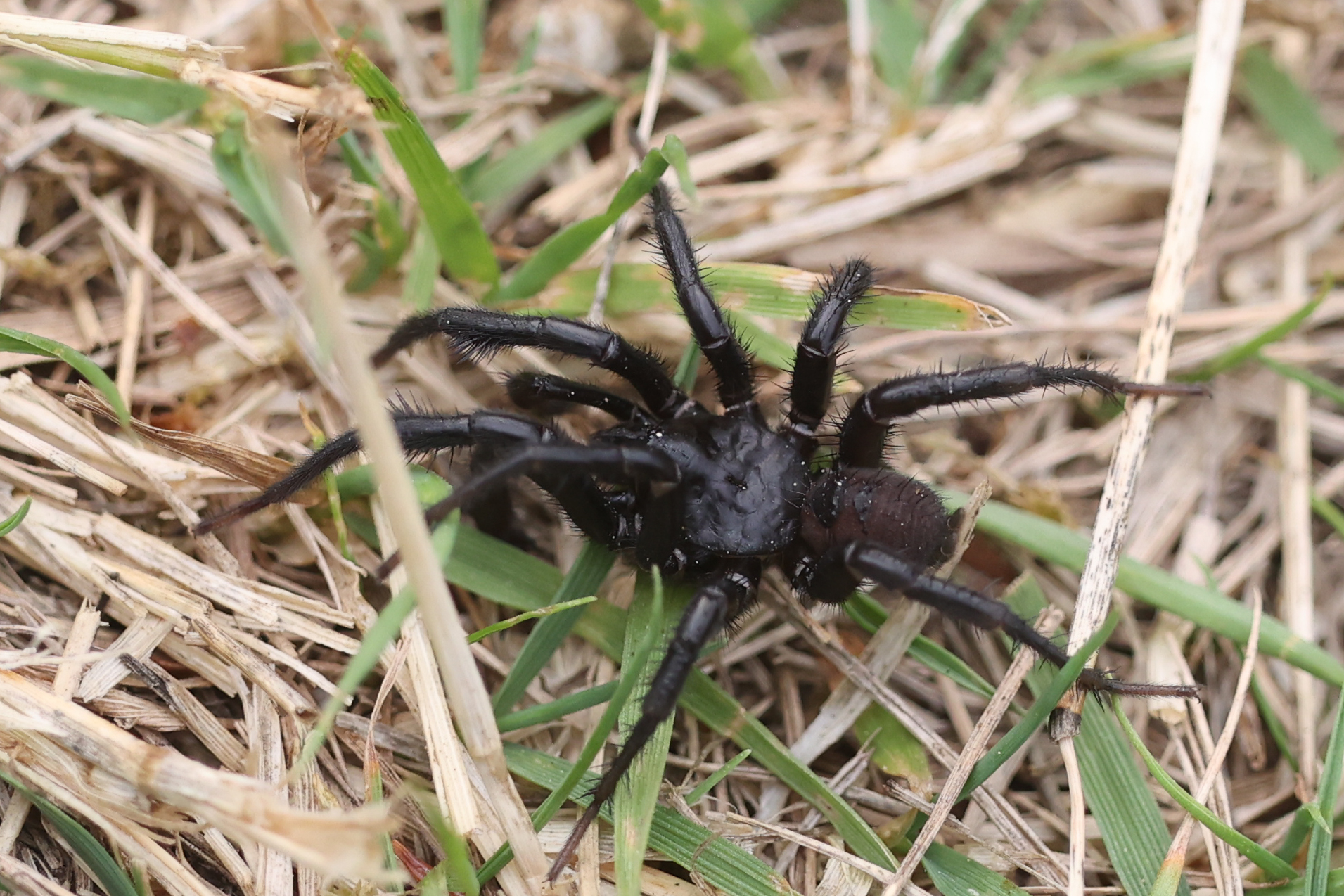
- Male A. pacificus

Scientific classification
- Kingdom: Animalia
- Phylum: Arthropoda
- Subphylum: Chelicerata
- Class: Arachnida
- Order: Araneae
- Infraorder: Mygalomorphae
- Family: Antrodiaetidae
- Genus: Antrodiaetus; Ausserer, 1871

Type species
- A. unicolor (Hentz, 1842)

Species
- 18, See text.

Synonyms
- Acattyma; Brachybothrium

= Antrodiaetus =

Genus of spiders

Antrodiaetus is a genus of American and Japanese folding trapdoor spiders first described by Anton Ausserer in 1871. The name is a combination of the Greek "antrodiaitos" (αντροδιαιτος), meaning "living in caves", "antron" (αντρον), meaning "cave", and "diaita (διαιτα), meaning "way of life, dwelling".

== Species ==
As of October 2026, this genus includes eighteen species:

- Antrodiaetus apachecus Coyle, 1971 – United States
- Antrodiaetus ashlandensis Cokendolpher, Peck & Niwa, 2005 – United States
- Antrodiaetus cerberus Coyle, 1971 – United States
- Antrodiaetus coylei Cokendolpher, Peck & Niwa, 2005 – United States
- Antrodiaetus effeminatus Cokendolpher, Peck & Niwa, 2005 – United States
- Antrodiaetus hageni (Chamberlin, 1917) – Canada, United States
- Antrodiaetus lincolnianus (Worley, 1928) – United States
- Antrodiaetus metapacificus Cokendolpher, Peck & Niwa, 2005 – United States
- Antrodiaetus microunicolor Hendrixson & Bond, 2005 – United States
- Antrodiaetus montanus (Chamberlin & Ivie, 1935) – United States
- Antrodiaetus occultus Coyle, 1971 – United States
- Antrodiaetus pacificus (Simon, 1885) – Canada, United States
- Antrodiaetus pugnax (Chamberlin, 1917) – Canada, United States
- Antrodiaetus robustus (Simon, 1891) – United States
- Antrodiaetus roretzi (L. Koch, 1878) – Japan
- Antrodiaetus stygius Coyle, 1971 – United States
- Antrodiaetus unicolor (Hentz, 1842) – United States
- Antrodiaetus yesoensis (Uyemura, 1942) – Japan
