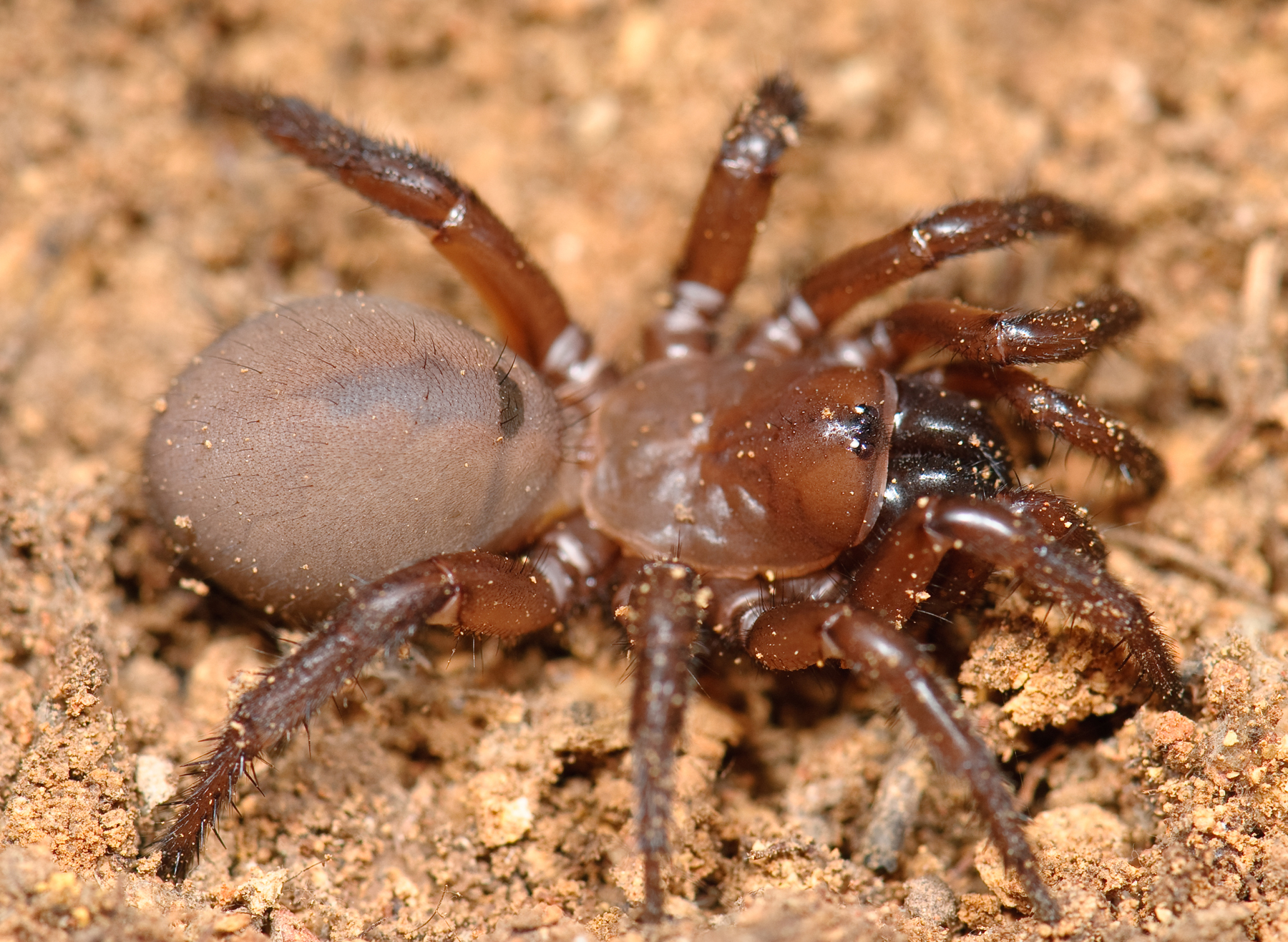
- Antrodiaetus unicolor, female

Scientific classification
- Kingdom: Animalia
- Phylum: Arthropoda
- Subphylum: Chelicerata
- Class: Arachnida
- Order: Araneae
- Infraorder: Mygalomorphae
- Clade: Atypoidea
- Family: Antrodiaetidae; Gertsch, 1940

Genera
- See text.

Diversity
- 4 genera, > 38 species
- blue: reported countries (WSC) green: observation hotspots (iNaturalist)

= Antrodiaetidae =

Folding trapdoor spiders Temporal range: Cretaceous–present

Family of folding trapdoor spiders

Antrodiaetidae, also known as folding trapdoor spiders or folding-door spiders, is a small spider family related to atypical tarantulas. They are found almost exclusively in the western and midwestern United States, from California to Washington and east to the Appalachian Mountains. Exceptions include Antrodiaetus roretzi and Antrodiaetus yesoensis, which are endemic to Japan and are considered relict species. It is likely that two separate vicariance events led to the evolution of these two species.

== Genera ==
As of October 2026, this family includes four genera and 38 species:

- Aliatypus Smith, 1908 – United States
- Antrodiaetus Ausserer, 1871 – Japan, North America
- Atypoides O. Pickard-Cambridge, 1883 – United States
- Hexura Simon, 1885 – North America

== Name ==
The name “folding-door” describes how they open or close the entrance to their burrow; they unfold or fold the door.
