= Loxosceles similis =

Scientific classification
- Kingdom: Animalia
- Phylum: Arthropoda
- Subphylum: Chelicerata
- Class: Arachnida
- Order: Araneae
- Infraorder: Araneomorphae
- Family: Sicariidae
- Genus: Loxosceles
- Species: L. similis

Binomial name
- Loxosceles similis Moenkhaus, 1898

Species of spider

Loxosceles similis, is a species of a venomous recluse spider endemic to South America.

== Description and behavior ==
Loxosceles similis is not a well-known spider, it is known that two male specimens collected from Brazil, were 5.23 mm and 4.94 mm long and 3.75 mm and 2.96 mm wide respectively, and presented discreet disposition of the overall body color. This species has cave dwelling habits, although it can also occur in homes. Although not very well known, it is possible like other recluse spiders, that this species feeds on small insects, has nocturnal habits and is not aggressive.

== Range and habitat ==
This species occurs in Brazil, in Pará, Minas Gerais, São Paulo, Mato Grosso do Sul and Bahia.

== Venom ==
A recent study on the characterization of the venom of this species showed that its biological effects have an intensity similar to that of Loxosceles laeta, Loxosceles intermedia and Loxosceles gaucho, an experimental study with rabbits injected with 0.5 μg (500 nanograms) of the venom resulted in severe edema, diffuse heterophilic inflammatory infiltrate, perivascular heterophilic infiltrate, thrombosis in all layers of the dermis, fibrinoid necrosis of the arteriolar wall, cutaneous muscle necrosis and dermal hemorrhage. It is concluded that L. similis venom induces apoptosis of endothelial cells. The minimum, average and maximum amount of venom produced by L. similis is 0.10 mg, 0.70 mg and 1.5 mg respectively.
