= Loxosceles adelaida =

Scientific classification
- Kingdom: Animalia
- Phylum: Arthropoda
- Subphylum: Chelicerata
- Class: Arachnida
- Order: Araneae
- Infraorder: Araneomorphae
- Family: Sicariidae
- Genus: Loxosceles
- Species: L. adelaida

Binomial name
- Loxosceles adelaida Gertsch, 1967

Species of venomous recluse spider

Loxosceles adelaida is a species of venomous recluse spider found in South America.

L. adelaida inhabits mainly in caves, but has also been reported in forests adjacent to caves in Brazil. A recent study on the biological activity of venom of this species proved that it has a similar potential to induce hemolysis, dermonecrosis and lethality that L. gaucho, its venom produced a component of 31 kDa, endowed with hemolytic and dermonecrotic activities, therefore it has the potential to cause serious accidents as well as synanthropic species.
