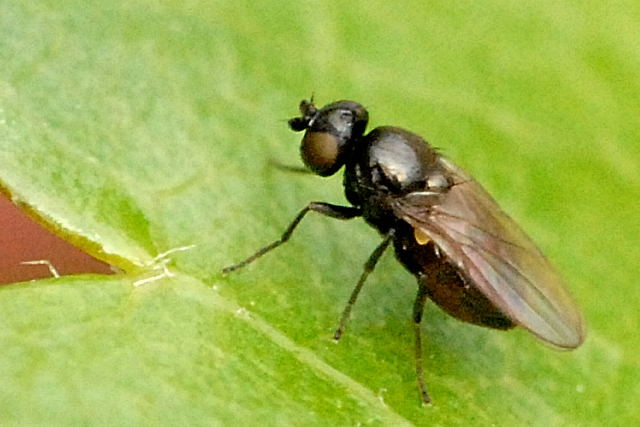

Scientific classification
- Kingdom: Animalia
- Phylum: Arthropoda
- Clade: Pancrustacea
- Class: Insecta
- Order: Diptera
- Family: Stratiomyidae
- Subfamily: Pachygastrinae
- Genus: Zabrachia
- Species: Z. tenella

Binomial name
- Zabrachia tenella (Jaennicke, 1866)

Synonyms
- Pachygaster tenella Jaennicke, 1866

= Zabrachia tenella =

Species of fly

Zabrachia tenella, the pine black, is a European species of soldier fly.It has a wing length of approximately 2.5–3.5 mm, rendering it one of the smallest soldier flies in Europe. It Resembles Neopachygaster meromelas but has a swollen female occiput and fused R4+5 wing vein.The face is dark and lacking the silver stripe of N. meromelas. The larva feeds on fungus associated with decaying pine trees.
