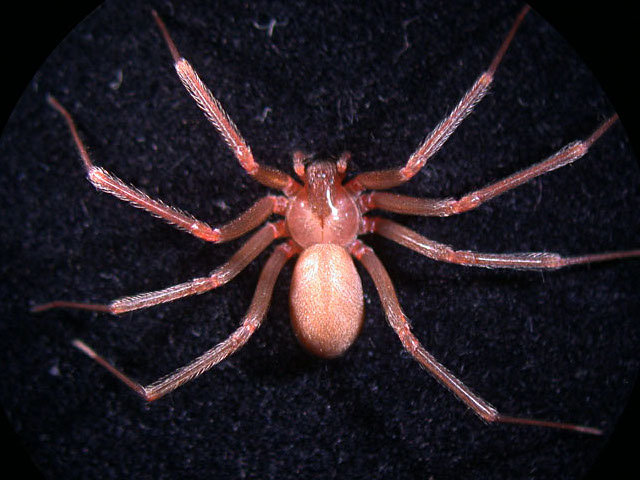
- Female
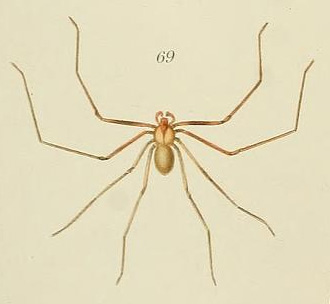
- Drawing of male (1906)

Scientific classification
- Kingdom: Animalia
- Phylum: Arthropoda
- Subphylum: Chelicerata
- Class: Arachnida
- Order: Araneae
- Infraorder: Araneomorphae
- Family: Sicariidae
- Genus: Loxosceles
- Species: L. rufescens

Binomial name
- Loxosceles rufescens (Dufour, 1820)

= Mediterranean recluse spider =

Species of spider

The Mediterranean recluse spider (Loxosceles rufescens) is a species of spider that originated in the Mediterranean region as its name implies, but can now be found in many parts of the world and is listed as one of the most invasive spiders worldwide. Usually dwelling in caves, this species will also inhabit basements and tunnels. The spider hunts at night and eats insects including silverfish and cockroaches, and they usually target smaller species.

Similar to other species in their genus, bites from L. rufescens can cause necrosis and, for some individuals, systemic damage due to the enzyme sphingomyelinase D. Pest control may be undertaken with similar strategies as used for the brown recluse spider.

== Characteristics ==
Eye pattern

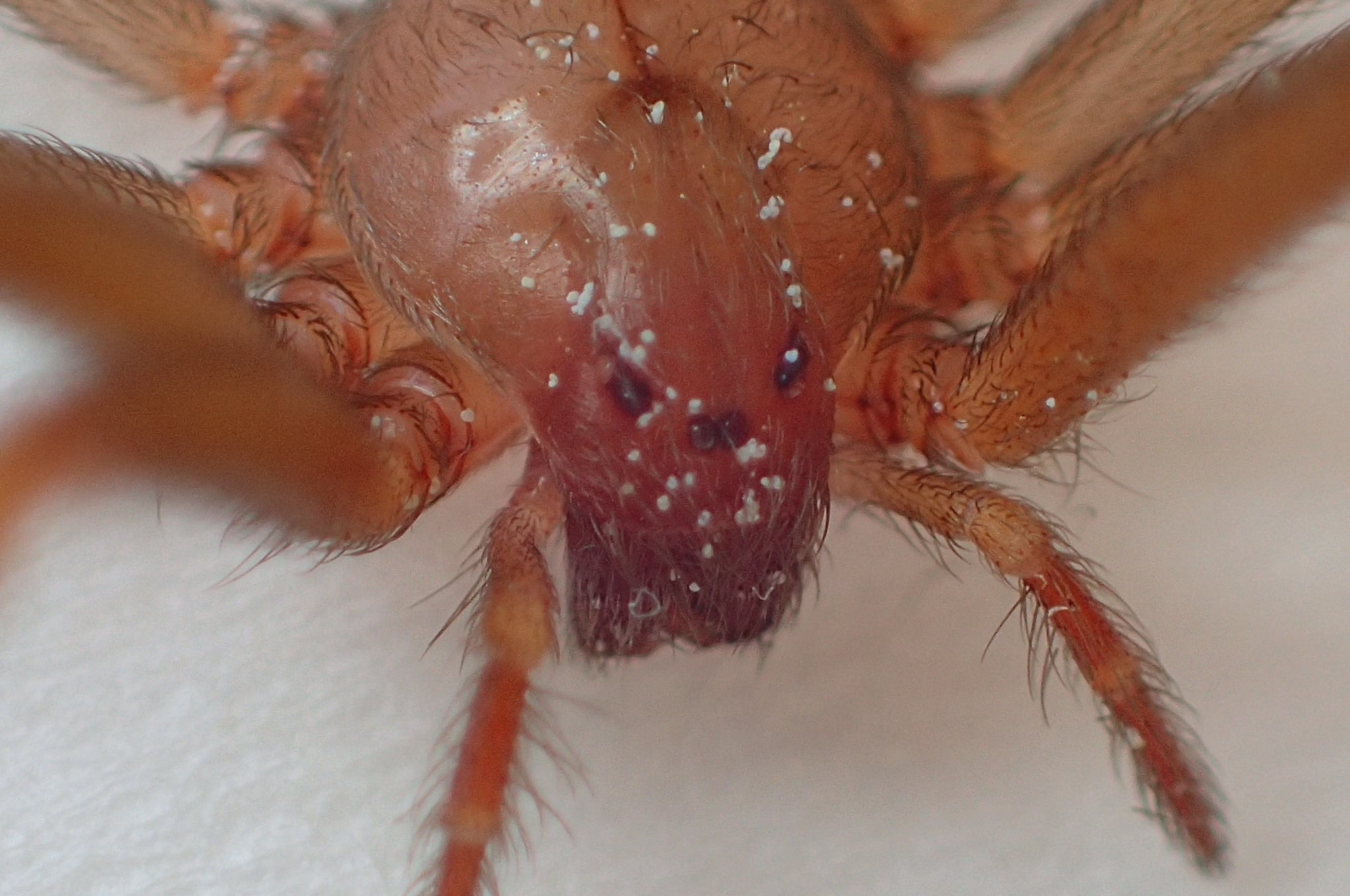
closeup of eyes

Loxosceles rufescens is a cave-dwelling arachnid that is nearly indistinguishable in appearance from Loxosceles reclusa, the brown recluse spider. Individuals can be identified as medium-sized spiders distinguished by three pairs of two eyes organized in the shape of a triangle (spiders commonly have eight eyes), with a violin-shaped pattern on their cephalothorax. This spider belongs to the genus Loxosceles which contains many of the most dangerous spiders in the world. Both males and females grow to approximately 7–7.5 mm in length.

Loxosceles rufescens egg sacs contain approximately 40 eggs that each take a few weeks to hatch, depending on the temperature. The young spiders grow slowly and produce molts during their growing phase. These molts often have a pale ghostly appearance. Mediterranean recluse spiders typically live from one to three years. The webs of Mediterranean recluse spiders spin function as a daytime hiding spot and provide seclusion for the egg sacs. The webs are very thin and fragile, formed by strands of silk laid in a disorganized manner.

== Distribution and habitat ==
The Mediterranean recluse is listed as one of the most invasive species in the world. It is native to the Mediterranean area and western Asia, including parts of Europe and Northern Africa, and prefers warm temperatures and generally dry weather. Today, this spider has a global distribution due to increased human travel and the increase of transported goods.

This species has been introduced to Madagascar, southeast Asia from India to Japan, Australia, and numerous Atlantic and Pacific islands (including four in the Hawaiian archipelago) and in North America, it has been recorded in over 20 of the United States, widely scattered from California to Florida and north to Michigan, as well as Ontario, Canada.

In South Africa, only a single specimen was recorded from Cape Town in 1914.

In areas where L. rufescens are non-native, they can be found in semi-arid environments and damp areas such as basements, caves, and tunnels. In these locations, individuals can find their favorable meal of cockroaches and silverfish. During a routine building pest check-in in 2021, spiders of this species were found in the basement of the University of Michigan's Shapiro Undergraduate Library, which led to its closure for two days.

== Ecology ==
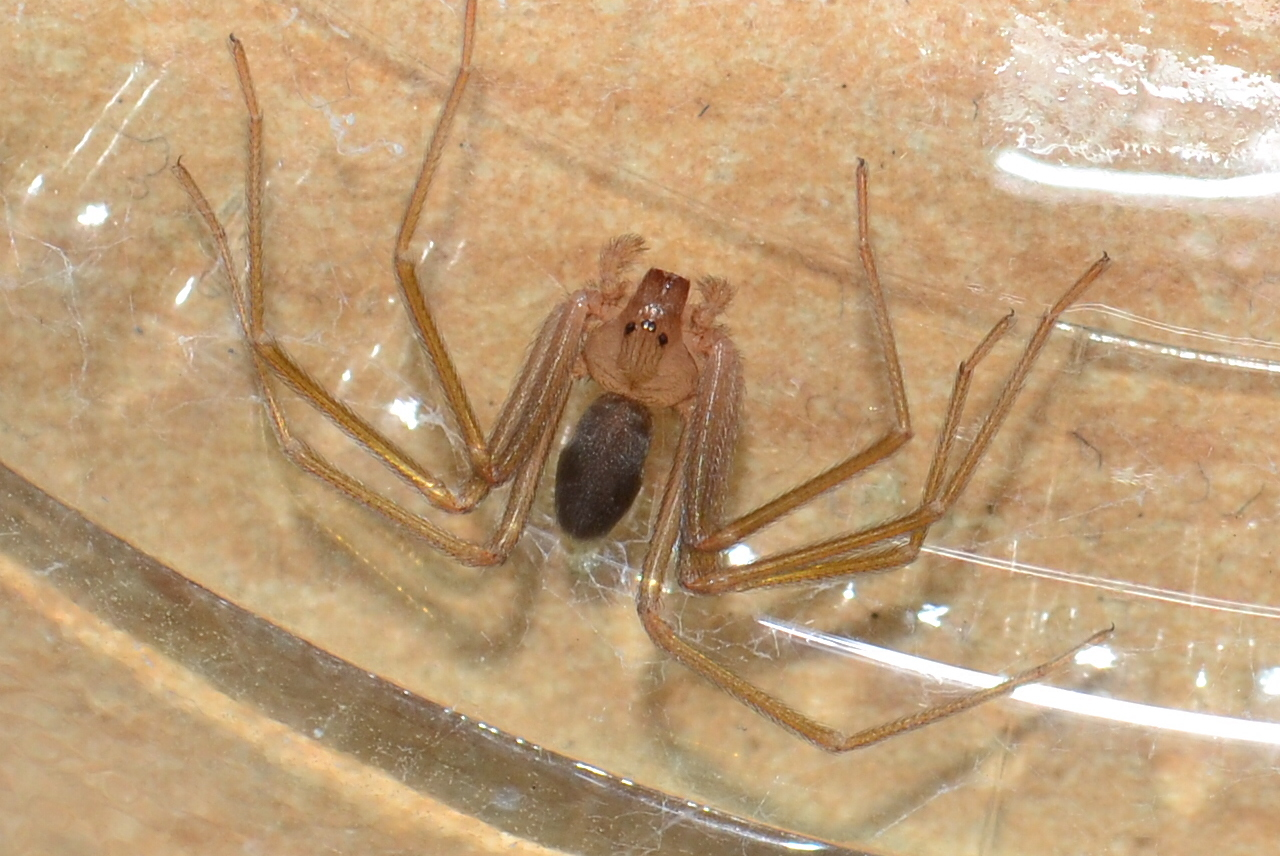
Juvenile

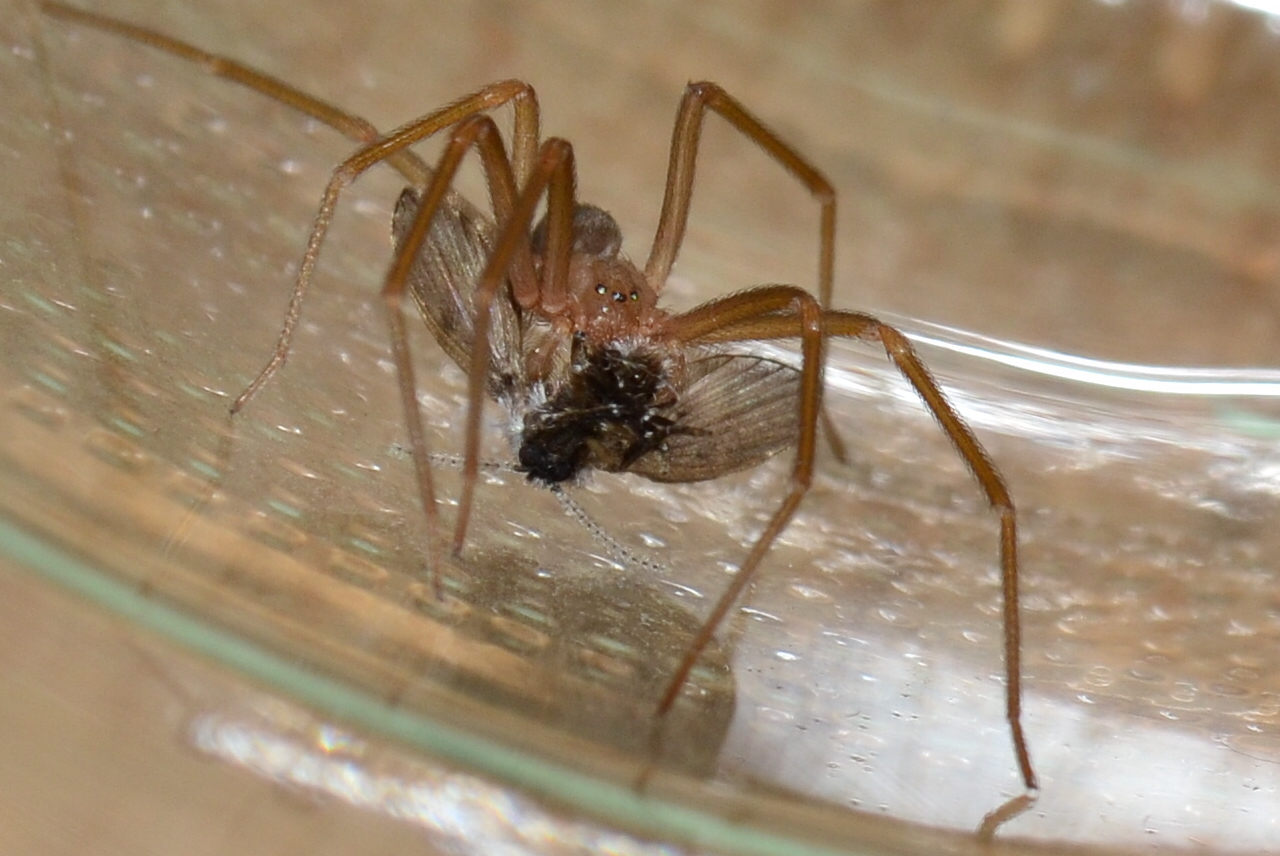
With prey (moth fly)

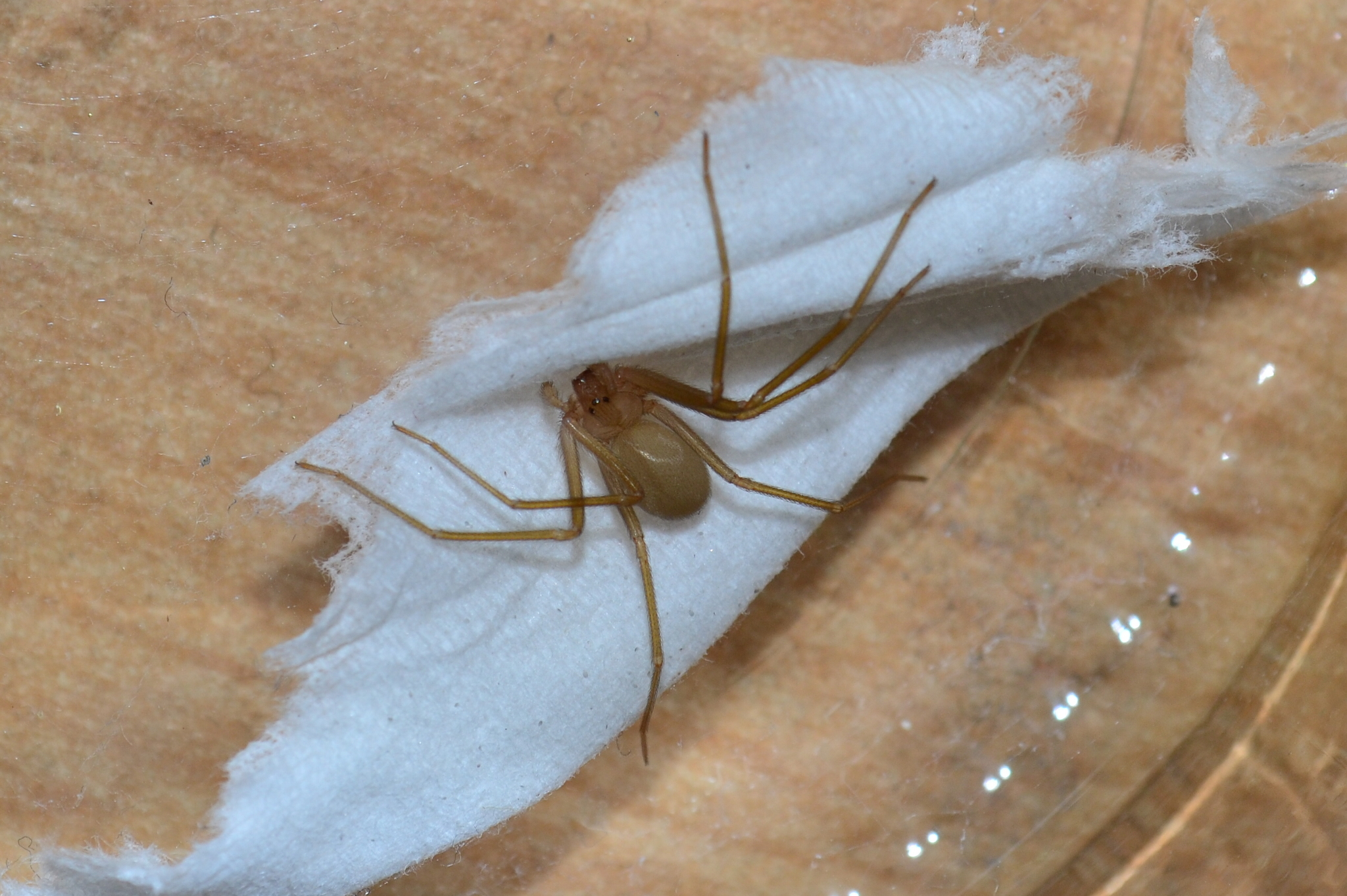
From Croatia

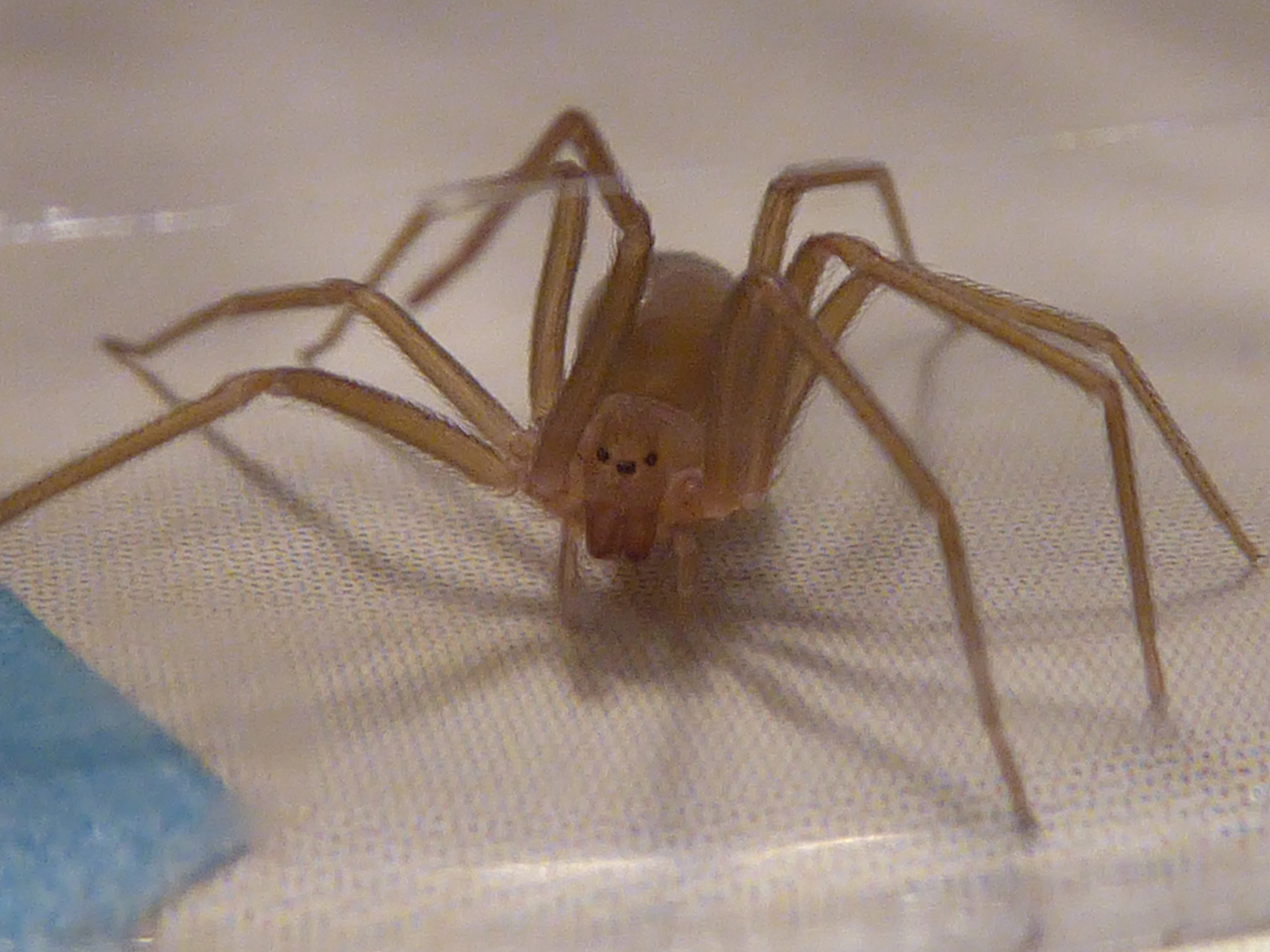

Loxosceles rufescens differs from many other spider species in their predatory behavior. L. rufescens is an active hunter and will set out at night to capture and kill a variety of arthropods that are susceptible to their venom rather than catching them in a web. They are most active at night and typically target smaller insects because of their vulnerable soft exoskeleton. Males are more prolific hunters than female individuals partly due to their simultaneous search for a potential mate.

== Threat to humans ==
Spiders in the genus Loxosceles are well known for their bite, causing skin necrosis and for some people, causing great damage and widespread, systemic effects. This is referred to as loxoscelism. The necrosis is due to the unique enzyme, sphingomyelinase D (SMase D). This enzyme from the Loxesceles venom alters the structure of the membrane raft, leading to protease activation on the membrane. This ultimately results in proteolytic cleavage of cell surface proteins and necrosis of the cell.

Most cases are medically insignificant, but in some cases, from 2 to 8 hours after a bite, there may be penetrating pain followed by a burning sensation. Areas adjacent to the bite often become red and painful due to vasospasm and ischemia. A blister may form which often changes to a dark blue color with a sunken center days following the bite. In rare cases, hemolysis, intravascular coagulation, and thrombocytopenia can occur, leading to renal failure.

In 2024, L. rufescens has been blamed for the deaths of two individuals in Italy; one a 52-year-old policeman from Palermo, bitten by L. rufescens, according to a local Sardinian newspaper, and the other a 23-year old male, who died more than a month after being bitten, according to ANSA news agency.

== Control and mitigation ==
Controlling Loxosceles species populations within dwellings can be challenging as they prefer to dwell in small, dark crevices. This is exacerbated by their ability to survive without food and water for extended periods.

There are no published control or mitigation efforts specifically directed to the Mediterranean recluse spider population, except for the mention of the need for further such efforts in a study conducted in Washington, D.C. However, with the indistinguishable features between the brown recluse and Mediterranean recluse spiders, efforts to control the brown recluse spider may be adapted to mitigate the Mediterranean recluse population. Many of these efforts may include regular pest control and vacuuming of dead insects, sanitizing, removal of spider webs, and the use of glue traps and insecticides.

== Conservation ==
Loxosceles rufescens is listed as Least Concern by the South African National Biodiversity Institute due to its wide geographical range globally, despite only a single historical record from South Africa.

== Etymology ==
The specific name rufescens means "reddish", referring to the coloration of the species.

== Taxonomy ==
The species was originally described by Léon Jean Marie Dufour in 1820 as Scytodes rufescens. It serves as the type species for the genus Loxosceles.
