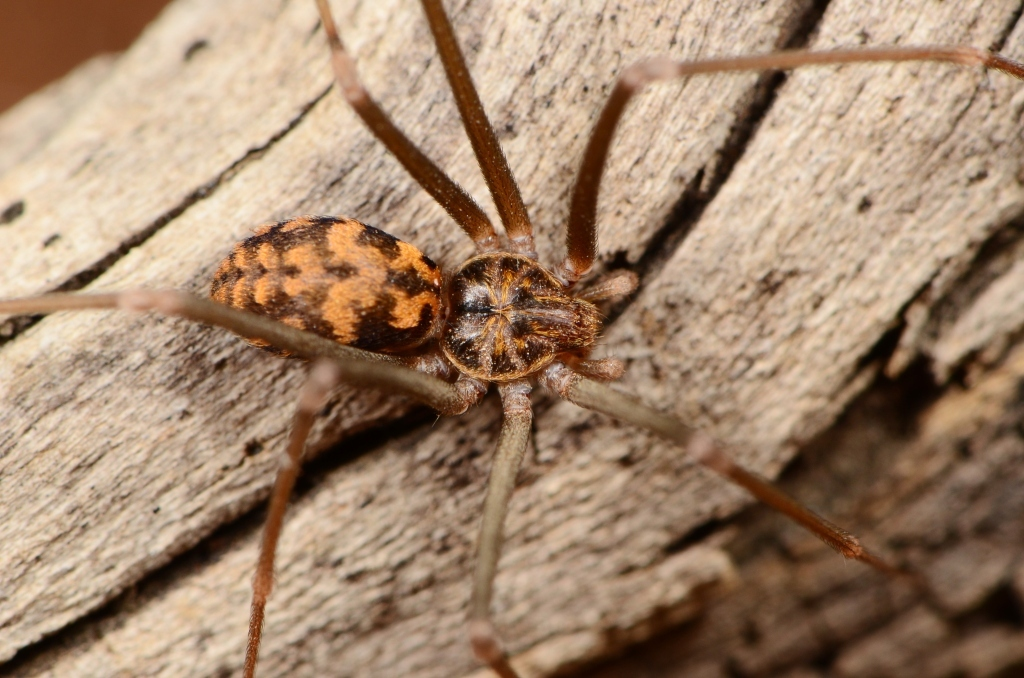
- female L. simillima

Scientific classification
- Kingdom: Animalia
- Phylum: Arthropoda
- Subphylum: Chelicerata
- Class: Arachnida
- Order: Araneae
- Infraorder: Araneomorphae
- Family: Sicariidae
- Genus: Loxosceles; Heineken & Lowe, 1832

Type species
- L. rufescens (Dufour, 1820)

Species
- 143, see text

Synonyms
- Calheirosia Mello-Leitão, 1917

= Recluse spider =

Recluse spider Temporal range: Neogene– Present

Group of venomous spiders

The recluse spiders (Loxosceles (/lɒkˈsɒsɪliːz/), also known as brown spiders, fiddle-backs, violin spiders, and reapers, are a genus of spiders that were first described by R. T. Lowe in 1832. They are venomous spiders known for their bite, which sometimes produces a characteristic set of symptoms known as loxoscelism.

Recluse spiders are now identified as members of the family Sicariidae, having formerly been placed in their own family, the Loxoscelidae. Although recluse spiders are feared, they are usually not aggressive.

== Relation with other spiders ==
Sicariidae are of the superfamily Scytodoidea. Other families in the Scytodoidea include Drymusidae, Scytodidae, and Periegopidae.

== Distribution ==
Spiders in this genus are found from North to South America, Oceania, Africa, Asia, and Europe.

== Habitat and appearance ==
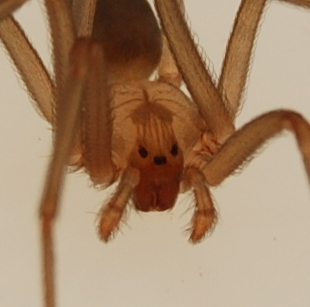
Eyes of a male Loxosceles reclusa

Diagram of eye arrangement of spiders in the genus Loxosceles

Loxosceles is distributed nearly worldwide in warmer areas. All have six eyes arranged in three groups of two (dyads) and some are brownish with a darker brown characteristic violin marking on the cephalothorax. However, the "violin marking" cannot be used as a reliable way to identify the spider as many unrelated species of spider have similar markings. Recluses are typically about 7–12 mm long.

The most common and most famous species in the United States is the brown recluse spider (Loxosceles reclusa). It is found in a large area of the Midwest, west to Colorado and the New Mexico state line and east to northern Georgia. Sporadic records from other locations only represent incidental introductions, not established populations. The brown recluse feeds on whatever small prey is available, and has been observed to prefer scavenging over actively hunting. Other notable members of this genus include the Chilean recluse spider (L. laeta) and the Mediterranean recluse spider (L. rufescens).

Recently, concerns have been raised regarding recluses spreading faster due to warmer air carrying them farther as a result of changing climate. On the contrary, newly hatched recluses do not travel via ballooning and thus the populations are confined to very tight spaces with dense populations. Many species of this genus can live for very long times without food or water. Insecticides often fail to kill the spider, instead intoxicating its nervous system and inducing erratic behavior.

== Life style ==
Members of Loxosceles can be divided into two groups: the savanna or grassland species and the cave dwellers.

The savanna species are found under rocks, logs, and bark of trees, in old termite nests or in rubble. They are not retreat bound and spin only a few irregular strands of silk serving as retreats under objects on the ground. In buildings they are found in dark corners. The gestation period is roughly three months and 3-4 egg cocoons are produced containing about 15 eggs each. Spiderlings reach maturity within a year and live at least three years.

The cave-dwelling species are more commonly found in the total dark zone than in the twilight zone.

== Description ==
=== Identification ===
This genus is very hard to identify, as they have very simple coloration and morphology. Many other spiders have similar dorsal markings, leading to confusion and misidentification. They can be most readily distinguished by having only six eyes, arranged in three pairs. None of the pairs of eyes touch each other, and are arranged in a U shape. The presence of two claws per foot and a rather flat cephalothorax further help distinguish them.

=== Diagnostic morphology ===
Body size ranges from 5-15 mm for females and 3.5-12 mm for males. Color of body is yellowish to reddish brown with contrasting darker markings. Legs and pedipalps are light brown. The carapace is slightly longer than wide with a conspicuous deeply impressed fovea. The clypeus and chelicerae are directed to the front, usually with a "violin-shaped" darker marking on the anterior part of the carapace. Six eyes are arranged in a recurved row in three groups, each with two eyes. Anterior median eyes are absent. The labium is longer than wide, tapering distally and partially fused to the sternum. The chelicerae are fused at the base. The abdomen is oval and light brown, usually with dark patterns. Legs are long and slender with two claws.

== Venom components and effects ==
Loxosceles spiders, like Hexophthalma species, have potent tissue-destroying venoms containing the dermonecrotic agent sphingomyelinase D, which is otherwise found only in a few pathogenic bacteria. A 2008 research has indicated the venom is composed largely of sulfated nucleosides, though these compounds are relatively new discoveries, so little is known about them. The venom of several species is capable of producing necrotic lesions that are slow to heal and may require skin grafts. Rarely, the venom is carried by the bloodstream, causing red blood cell destruction.

The venom is identical in male and female spiders, but females can have almost twice the concentration of toxins. For unknown reasons, the toxicity of the venom to mammalian species varies; recluse bites may cause necrosis in humans, rabbits, and guinea pigs, but not in mice or rats.

The Chilean recluse (L. laeta) supposedly has a more potent venom, which results in systemic involvement more often. All Loxosceles species that have been tested have venoms similar to that of the brown recluse, and all should be avoided. In general, though, they are not aggressive and commonly occupy human dwellings without causing problems.

Many types of skin wounds are mistaken for or assumed to be the result of a recluse spider bite. Several diseases can mimic the lesions of the bite, including Lyme disease, various fungal and bacterial infections, and the first sore of syphilis. It is important to associate the spider directly with the bite to avoid improper treatment, and to successfully treat common infections or other conditions if no spider was seen.

Bites most often occur as a defense when the spider is trapped against the skin, in clothing, for example. The proteins injected in the venom are minute (only 2 μg injected out of 65–100 μg in the venom glands).

The bite of a recluse spider can generally be categorized into one of the following groups:

- Unremarkable – self-healing minute damage
- Mild reaction – self-healing lesion with itchiness and redness
- Dermonecrotic – the uncommon, "classic" recluse bite, producing a necrotic skin lesion. About 66% of necrotic bite lesions heal with no complications. In extreme cases, the lesion may be up to 40 millimeters wide, last for several months, and heal with a permanent scar.
- Systemic or viscerocutaneous – an extremely rare, systemic reaction to envenomation of the bloodstream. It is observed more often in children.

Most bites are unremarkable or mild.

== Taxonomy ==
The genus Loxosceles was established by Heinecken & Lowe in 1832, with Loxosceles rufescens as the type species. The genus has been revised by Lotz (2012, 2017) and Magalhães et al. (2017).

=== Species ===
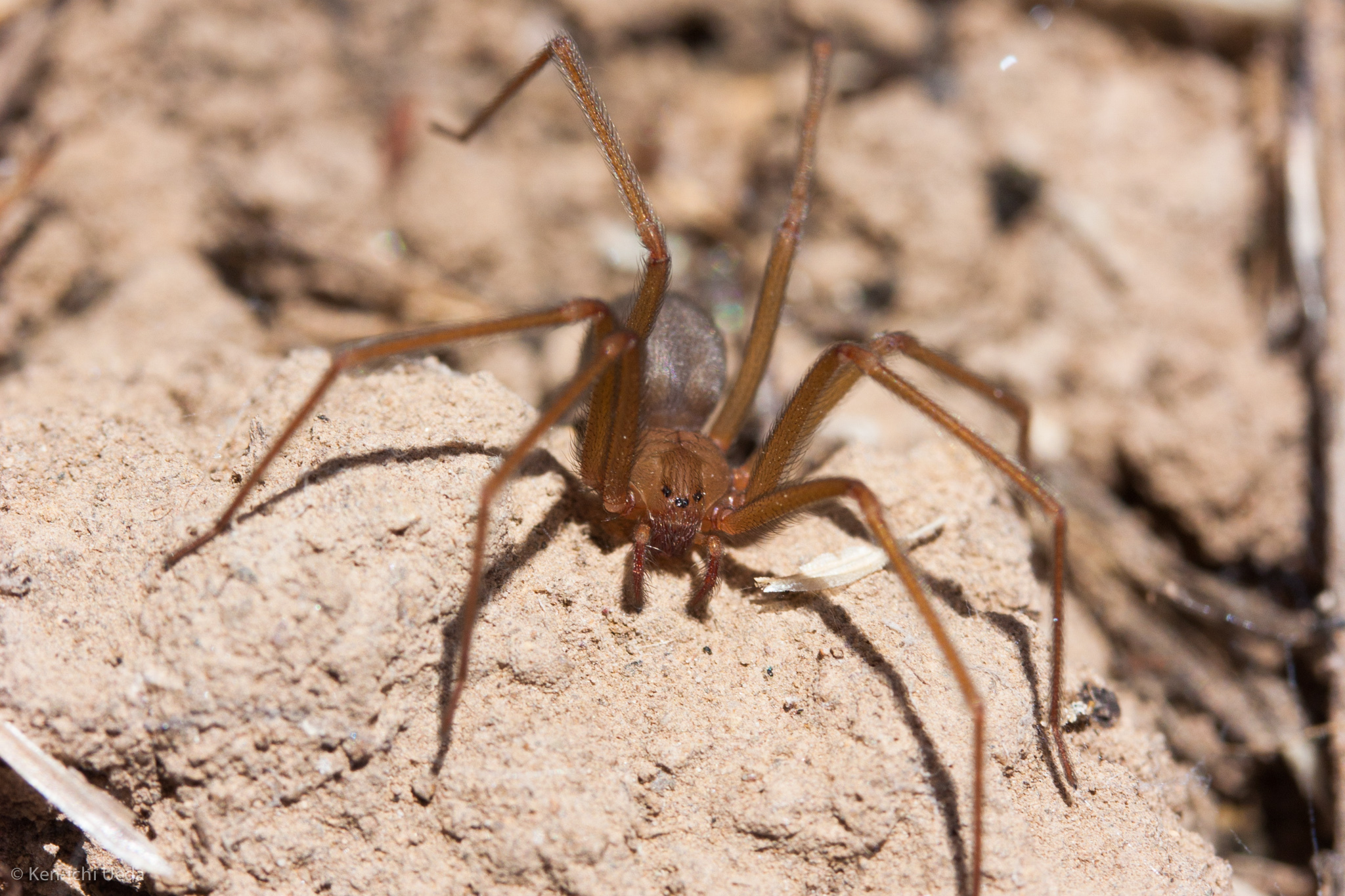
L. deserta

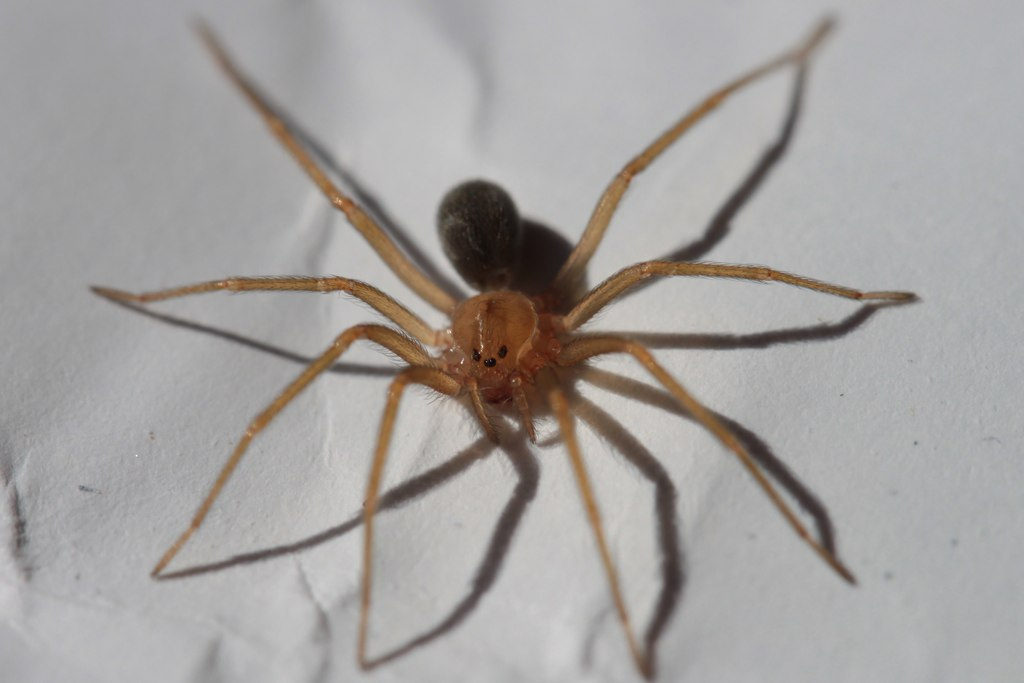
L. gaucho

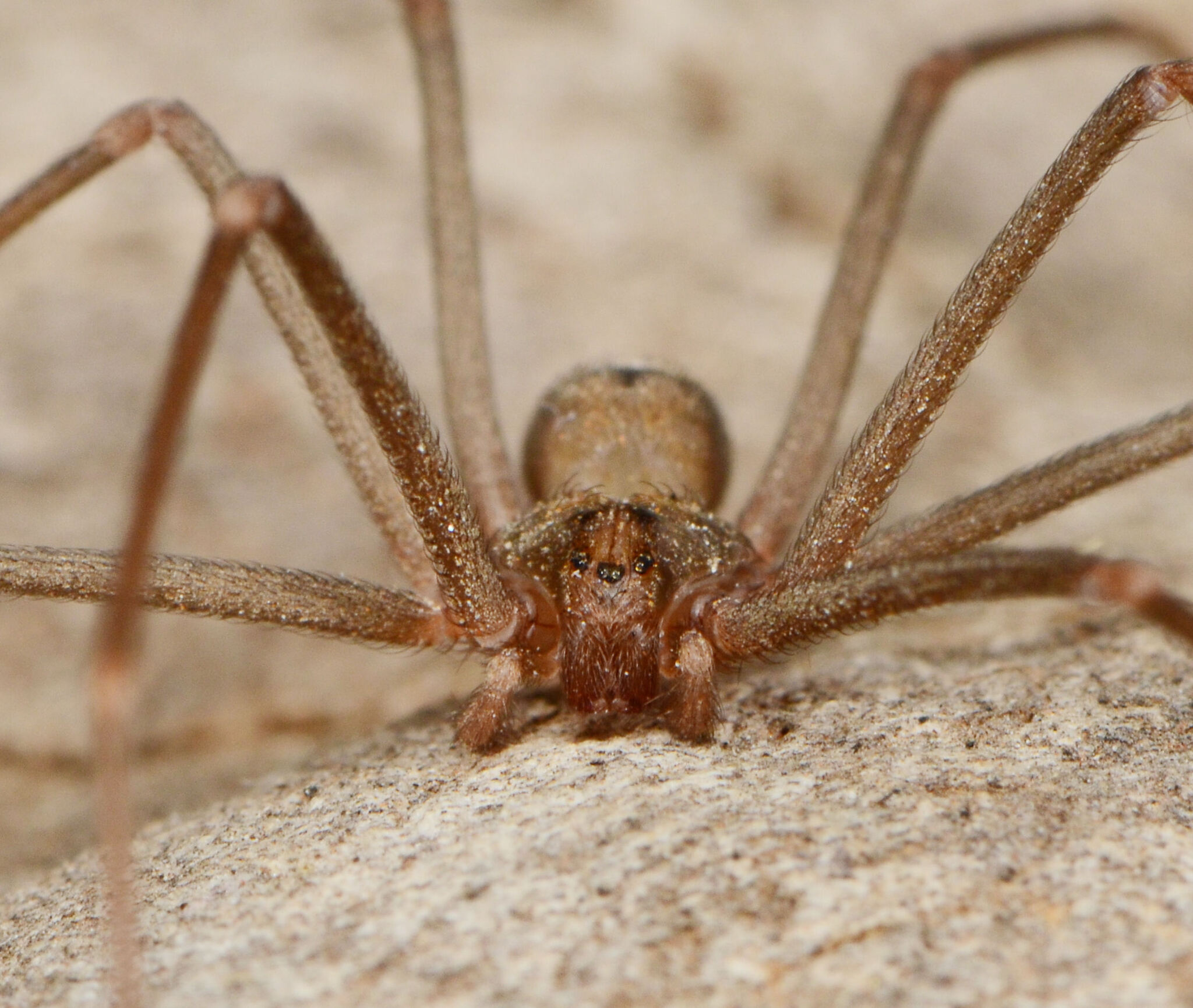
L. parramae

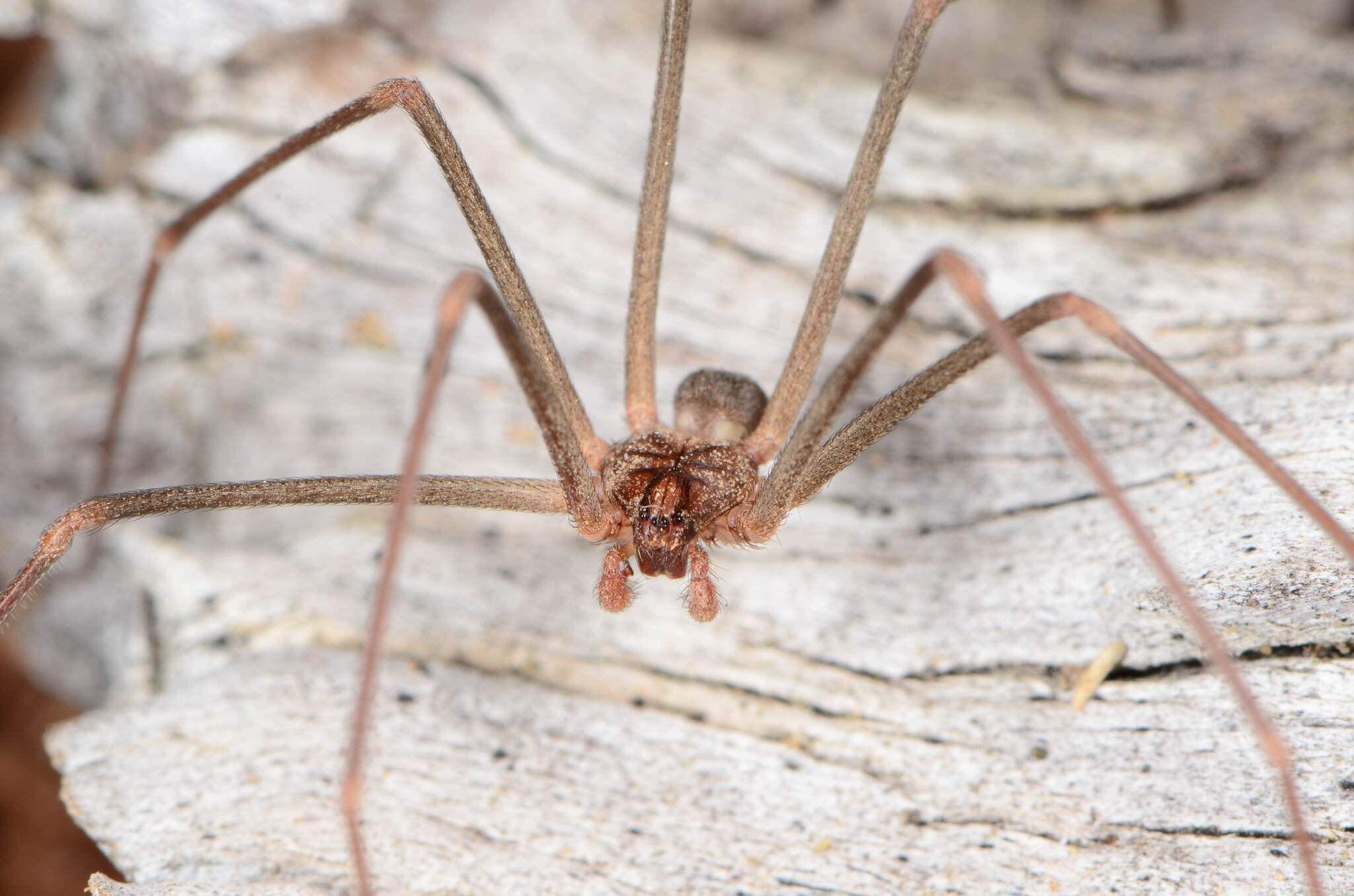
male L. spinulosa

As of September 2025, this genus includes 148 species.

These species have articles on Wikipedia:

- Loxosceles accepta Chamberlin, 1920 – Peru
- Loxosceles adelaida Gertsch, 1967 – Brazil
- Loxosceles apachea Gertsch & Ennik, 1983 – United States, Mexico
- Loxosceles arizonica Gertsch & Mulaik, 1940 – United States
- Loxosceles blanda Gertsch & Ennik, 1983 – United States
- Loxosceles cederbergensis Lotz, 2017 – South Africa
- Loxosceles coheni Zamani, Mirshamsi & Marusik, 2021 – Iran
- Loxosceles dejagerae Lotz, 2017 – South Africa
- Loxosceles deserta Gertsch, 1973 – United States, Mexico
- Loxosceles devia Gertsch & Mulaik, 1940 – United States, Mexico
- Loxosceles gaucho Gertsch, 1967 – Brazil. Introduced to Tunisia
- Loxosceles guatemala Gertsch, 1973 – Guatemala
- Loxosceles haddadi Lotz, 2017 – South Africa
- Loxosceles intermedia Mello-Leitão, 1934 – Brazil, Argentina
- Loxosceles laeta (Nicolet, 1849) – South America. Introduced to Canada, United States, Gutemala, Finland, Australia
- Loxosceles makapanensis Lotz, 2017 – South Africa
- Loxosceles palma Gertsch & Ennik, 1983 – United States, Mexico
- Loxosceles parramae Newlands, 1981 – South Africa
- Loxosceles pilosa Purcell, 1908 – Namibia, South Africa
- Loxosceles reclusa Gertsch & Mulaik, 1940 – North America
- Loxosceles rufescens (Dufour, 1820) – Southern Europe, northern Africa to Iran, Afghanistan. Introduced to United States, Mexico, Peru, Macaronesia, St. Helena, South Africa, India, China, Japan, Korea, Laos, Thailand, Philippines, Australia, Hawaii (type species)
- Loxosceles similis Moenkhaus, 1898 – Brazil
- Loxosceles simillima Lawrence, 1927 – DR Congo, Angola, Zambia, Malawi, Namibia, Botswana, Zimbabwe, Mozambique, South Africa
- Loxosceles sonora Gertsch & Ennik, 1983 – Mexico
- Loxosceles speluncarum Simon, 1893 – South Africa
- Loxosceles spinulosa Purcell, 1904 – South Africa

Complete species list As of September 2025
- L. accepta Chamberlin, 1920 – Peru
- L. adelaida Gertsch, 1967 – Brazil
- L. alamosa Gertsch & Ennik, 1983 – Mexico
- L. alicea Gertsch, 1967 – Peru
- L. amazonica Gertsch, 1967 – Peru, Brazil
- L. anomala (Mello-Leitão, 1917) – Brazil
- L. apachea Gertsch & Ennik, 1983 – United States, Mexico - Apache recluse
- L. aranea Gertsch, 1973 – Mexico
- L. arizonica Gertsch & Mulaik, 1940 – United States - Arizona recluse
- L. aurea Gertsch, 1973 – Mexico
- L. baja Gertsch & Ennik, 1983 – Mexico
- L. barbara Gertsch & Ennik, 1983 – Mexico
- L. belli Gertsch, 1973 – Mexico
- L. bentejui Planas & Ribera, 2015 – Canary Islands
- L. bergeri Strand, 1906 – Namibia
- L. bettyae Gertsch, 1967 – Peru
- L. binfordae Dupérré & Tapia, 2024 – Ecuador
- L. blancasi Gertsch, 1967 – Peru
- L. blanda Gertsch & Ennik, 1983 – United States
- L. bodoquena Bertani & Gallão, 2024 – Brazil
- L. boneti Gertsch, 1958 – Mexico, El Salvador
- L. boqueirao Bertani & Gallão, 2024 – Brazil
- L. candela Gertsch & Ennik, 1983 – Mexico
- L. carabobensis González-Sponga, 2010 – Venezuela
- L. cardosoi Bertani, von Schimonsky & Gallão, 2018 – Brazil
- L. caribbaea Gertsch, 1958 – Greater Antilles
- L. carinhanha Bertani, von Schimonsky & Gallão, 2018 – Brazil
- L. carmena Gertsch & Ennik, 1983 – Mexico
- L. cederbergensis Lotz, 2017 – South Africa
- L. chapadensis Bertani, Fukushima & Nagahama, 2010 – Brazil
- L. chinateca Gertsch & Ennik, 1983 – Mexico
- L. coheni Zamani, Mirshamsi & Marusik, 2021 – Iran
- L. colima Gertsch, 1958 – Mexico
- L. conococha Gertsch, 1967 – Peru
- L. coquimbo Gertsch, 1967 – Chile
- L. corozalensis González-Sponga, 2010 – Venezuela
- L. coyote Gertsch & Ennik, 1983 – Mexico
- L. cubana Gertsch, 1958 – Cuba, Bahama Is. HIspaniola
- L. cubiroensis González-Sponga, 2010 – Venezuela
- L. curimaguensis González-Sponga, 2010 – Venezuela
- L. dejagerae Lotz, 2017 – South Africa
- L. deserta Gertsch, 1973 – United States, Mexico - Desert recluse
- L. devia Gertsch & Mulaik, 1940 – United States, Mexico
- L. diaguita Brescovit, Taucare-Ríos, Magalhaes & Santos, 2017 – Chile
- L. ericsoni Bertani, von Schimonsky & Gallão, 2018 – Brazil
- L. fontainei Millot, 1941 – Guinea
- L. foutadjalloni Millot, 1941 – Guinea
- L. francisca Gertsch & Ennik, 1983 – Mexico
- L. frizzelli Gertsch, 1967 – Peru
- L. galianoa Magalhaes, 2025 – Argentina
- L. gaucho Gertsch, 1967 – Brazil. Introduced to Tunisia - Gaucho spider
- L. gloria Gertsch, 1967 – Ecuador, Peru
- L. griffinae Lotz, 2017 – Namibia
- L. guajira Cala-Riquelme, Gutiérrez-Estrada & Flórez, 2015 – Colombia
- L. guatemala Gertsch, 1973 – Guatemala
- L. guayllabamba Dupérré & Tapia, 2024 – Ecuador
- L. guayota Planas & Ribera, 2015 – Canary Islands
- L. haddadi Lotz, 2017 – South Africa
- L. harrietae Gertsch, 1967 – Peru
- L. herreri Gertsch, 1967 – Peru
- L. hirsuta Mello-Leitão, 1931 – Brazil, Paraguay, Argentina
- L. huasteca Gertsch & Ennik, 1983 – Mexico
- L. hupalupa Planas & Ribera, 2015 – Canary Islands
- L. imazighen Ribera & Massa, 2021 – Morocco
- L. immodesta (Mello-Leitão, 1917) – Brazil
- L. inca Gertsch, 1967 – Peru
- L. insula Gertsch & Ennik, 1983 – Mexico
- L. intermedia Mello-Leitão, 1934 – Brazil, Argentina
- L. irishi Lotz, 2017 – Namibia
- L. jaca Gertsch & Ennik, 1983 – Mexico
- L. jamaica Gertsch & Ennik, 1983 – Jamaica
- L. jarmila Gertsch & Ennik, 1983 – Jamaica
- L. julia Gertsch, 1967 – Peru
- L. kaiba Gertsch & Ennik, 1983 – United States
- L. karstica Bertani, von Schimonsky & Gallão, 2018 – Brazil
- L. lacroixi Millot, 1941 – Ivory Coast
- L. laeta (Nicolet, 1849) – South America. Introduced to Canada, United States, Gutemala, Finland, Australia - Chilean recluse
- L. lawrencei Caporiacco, 1955 – Venezuela, Trinidad, Curaçao
- L. lutea Keyserling, 1877 – Colombia, Ecuador
- L. luteola Gertsch, 1973 – Mexico
- L. mahan Planas & Ribera, 2015 – Canary Islands
- L. maisi Sánchez-Ruiz & Brescovit, 2013 – Cuba
- L. makapanensis Lotz, 2017 – South Africa
- L. malintzi Valdez-Mondragón, Cortez-Roldán, Juárez-Sánchez & Solís-Catalán, 2018 – Mexico
- L. manuela Gertsch & Ennik, 1983 – Mexico
- L. maraisi Lotz, 2017 – Namibia
- L. martha Gertsch & Ennik, 1983 – United States
- L. meruensis Tullgren, 1910 – Ethiopia, Kenya, Tanzania
- L. misteca Gertsch, 1958 – Mexico
- L. mogote Sánchez-Ruiz & Brescovit, 2013 – Cuba
- L. mrazig Ribera & Planas, 2009 – Algeria, Tunisia
- L. mulege Gertsch & Ennik, 1983 – Mexico
- L. muriciensis Fukushima, de Andrade & Bertani, 2017 – Brazil
- L. nahuana Gertsch, 1958 – Mexico
- L. neuvillei Simon, 1909 – Ethiopia, Somalia, East Africa
- L. niedeguidonae de Andrade, Bertani, Nagahama & Barbosa, 2012 – Brazil
- L. olivaresi González-Sponga, 2010 – Venezuela
- L. olmea Gertsch, 1967 – Peru
- L. pallalla Brescovit, Taucare-Ríos, Magalhaes & Santos, 2017 – Chile
- L. palma Gertsch & Ennik, 1983 – United States, Mexico
- L. panama Gertsch, 1958 – Panama
- L. parramae Newlands, 1981 – South Africa
- L. persica Ribera & Zamani, 2017 – Iran
- L. pilosa Purcell, 1908 – Namibia, South Africa
- L. piura Gertsch, 1967 – Peru
- L. planetaria Bertani & Gallão, 2024 – Brazil
- L. pucara Gertsch, 1967 – Peru
- L. puortoi Martins, Knysak & Bertani, 2002 – Brazil
- L. reclusa Gertsch & Mulaik, 1940 – North America - Brown recluse
- L. rica Gertsch & Ennik, 1983 – Costa Rica
- L. rosana Gertsch, 1967 – Peru
- L. rothi Gertsch & Ennik, 1983 – Mexico
- L. rufescens (Dufour, 1820) – Southern Europe, northern Africa, Iran, Afghanistan. Introduced to United States, Mexico, Peru, Macaronesia, St. Helena, South Africa, India, China, Japan, Korea, Laos, Thailand, Philippines, Australia, Hawaii (type species) - Mediterranean recluse
- L. rufipes (Lucas, 1834) – Guatemala, Panama, Colombia. Introduced to West Africa
- L. russelli Gertsch & Ennik, 1983 – United States
- L. sabina Gertsch & Ennik, 1983 – United States
- L. sansebastianensis González-Sponga, 2010 – Venezuela
- L. seri Gertsch & Ennik, 1983 – Mexico
- L. similis Moenkhaus, 1898 – Brazil
- L. simillima Lawrence, 1927 – DR Congo, Angola, Zambia, Malawi, Namibia, Botswana, Zimbabwe, Mozambique, South Africa
- L. smithi Simon, 1897 – Ethiopia, Malawi, Kenya, Tanzania
- L. sonora Gertsch & Ennik, 1983 – Mexico
- L. spadicea Simon, 1907 – Peru, Bolivia, Argentina
- L. speluncarum Simon, 1893 – South Africa
- L. spinulosa Purcell, 1904 – South Africa
- L. surca Gertsch, 1967 – Peru, Chile
- L. taeniopalpus Simon, 1907 – Ecuador
- L. taino Gertsch & Ennik, 1983 – Bahama Is. Jamaica, Hispaniola
- L. tazarte Planas & Ribera, 2015 – Canary Islands
- L. tehuana Gertsch, 1958 – Mexico
- L. tenango Gertsch, 1973 – Mexico
- L. tenochtitlan Valdez-Mondragón & Navarro-Rodríguez, 2019 – Mexico
- L. teresa Gertsch & Ennik, 1983 – Mexico
- L. tibicena Planas & Ribera, 2015 – Canary Islands
- L. tlacolula Gertsch & Ennik, 1983 – Mexico
- L. tolantongo Navarro-Rodríguez & Valdez-Mondragón, 2020 – Mexico
- L. troglobia Souza & Ferreira, 2018 – Brazil
- L. turanensis Zamani, Mirshamsi & Marusik, 2021 – Iran, Turkmenistan
- L. valdosa Gertsch, 1973 – Mexico
- L. vallenar Brescovit, Taucare-Ríos, Magalhaes & Santos, 2017 – Chile
- L. variegata Simon, 1897 – Paraguay, Argentina
- L. vicentei Taucare-Ríos, Brescovit & Villablanca, 2022 – Chile
- L. virgo Gertsch & Ennik, 1983 – Virgin Islands
- L. vonwredei Newlands, 1980 – Namibia
- L. weyrauchi Gertsch, 1967 – Peru
- L. willianilsoni Fukushima, de Andrade & Bertani, 2017 – Brazil
- L. yucatana Chamberlin & Ivie, 1938 – Mexico, Belize, Guatemala
- L. zapoteca Gertsch, 1958 – Mexico

== See also ==
- Spider families
- List of spiders associated with cutaneous reactions
- Chilean recluse
