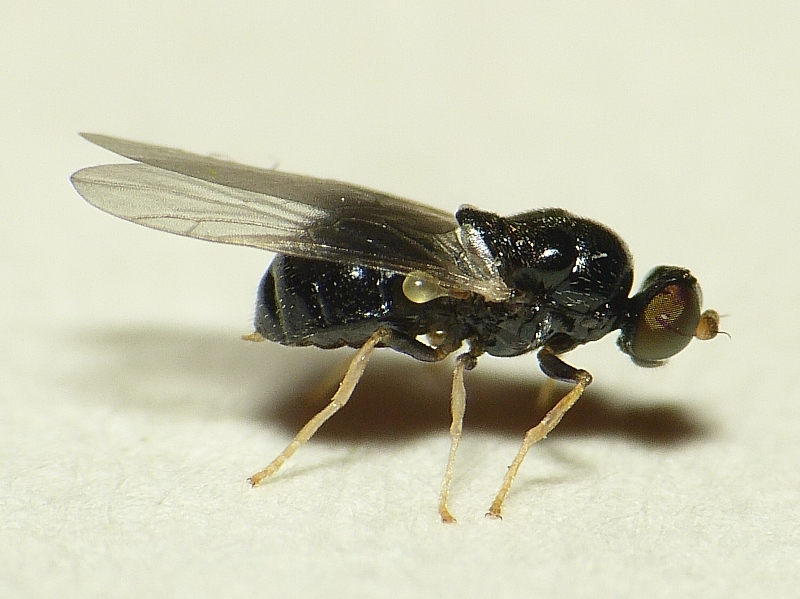
- Neopachygaster meromelaena, location: The Netherlands - Rhenen - Blauwe Kamer - Gelderland

Scientific classification
- Kingdom: Animalia
- Phylum: Arthropoda
- Class: Insecta
- Order: Diptera
- Family: Stratiomyidae
- Subfamily: Pachygastrinae
- Genus: Neopachygaster; Austen, 1901

Type species
- Pachygaster meromelas Dufour, 1841

= Neopachygaster =

Genus of flies

Neopachygaster is a genus of flies in the family Stratiomyidae.

== Species ==
- Neopachygaster admiranda Krivosheina & Freidberg, 2004
- Neopachygaster africana Lindner, 1938
- Neopachygaster basilewskyi Lindner, 1955
- Neopachygaster biafra Lindner, 1972
- Neopachygaster caucasica Krivosheina, 2004
- Neopachygaster congoensis Lindner, 1938
- Neopachygaster eisentrauti Lindner, 1972
- Neopachygaster intermedia (Krivosheina, 1965)
- Neopachygaster kiboensis Lindner, 1953
- Neopachygaster maculicornis (Hine, 1902)
- Neopachygaster meromelaena (Dufour, 1841)
- Neopachygaster occidentalis Kraft & Cook, 1961
- Neopachygaster reniformis Hull, 1942
- Neopachygaster secernibilis Krivosheina, 1973
- Neopachygaster stackelbergi (Krivosheina & Rozkošný, 1990)
- Neopachygaster stigma Lindner, 1938
- Neopachygaster valida Lindner, 1938
- Neopachygaster vitreus Hull, 1930
- Neopachygaster wittei Lindner, 1958
