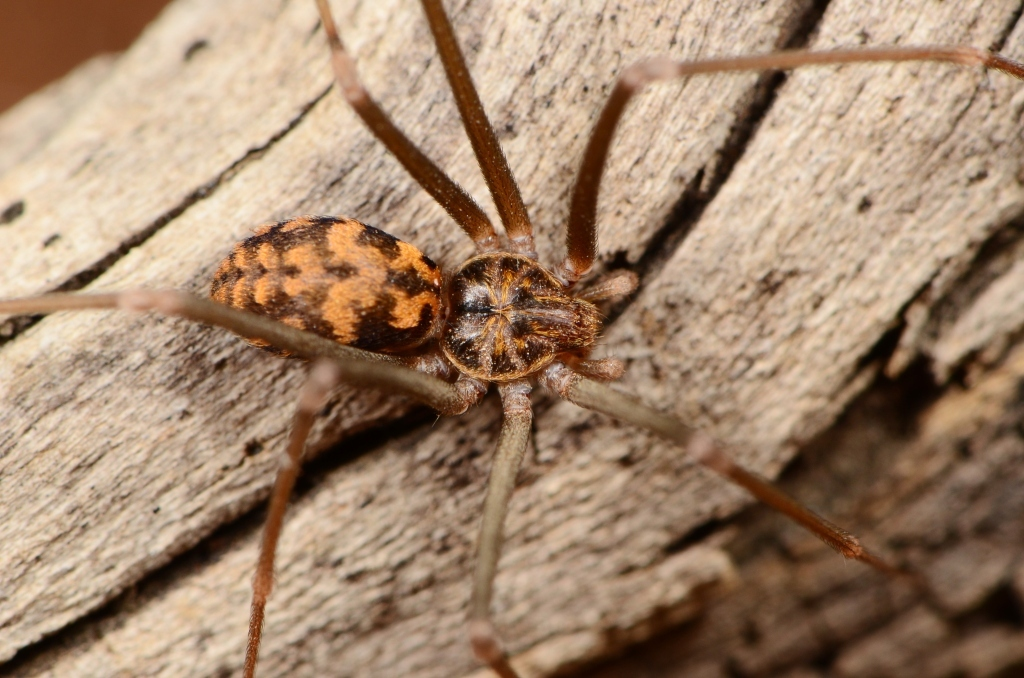
- Female
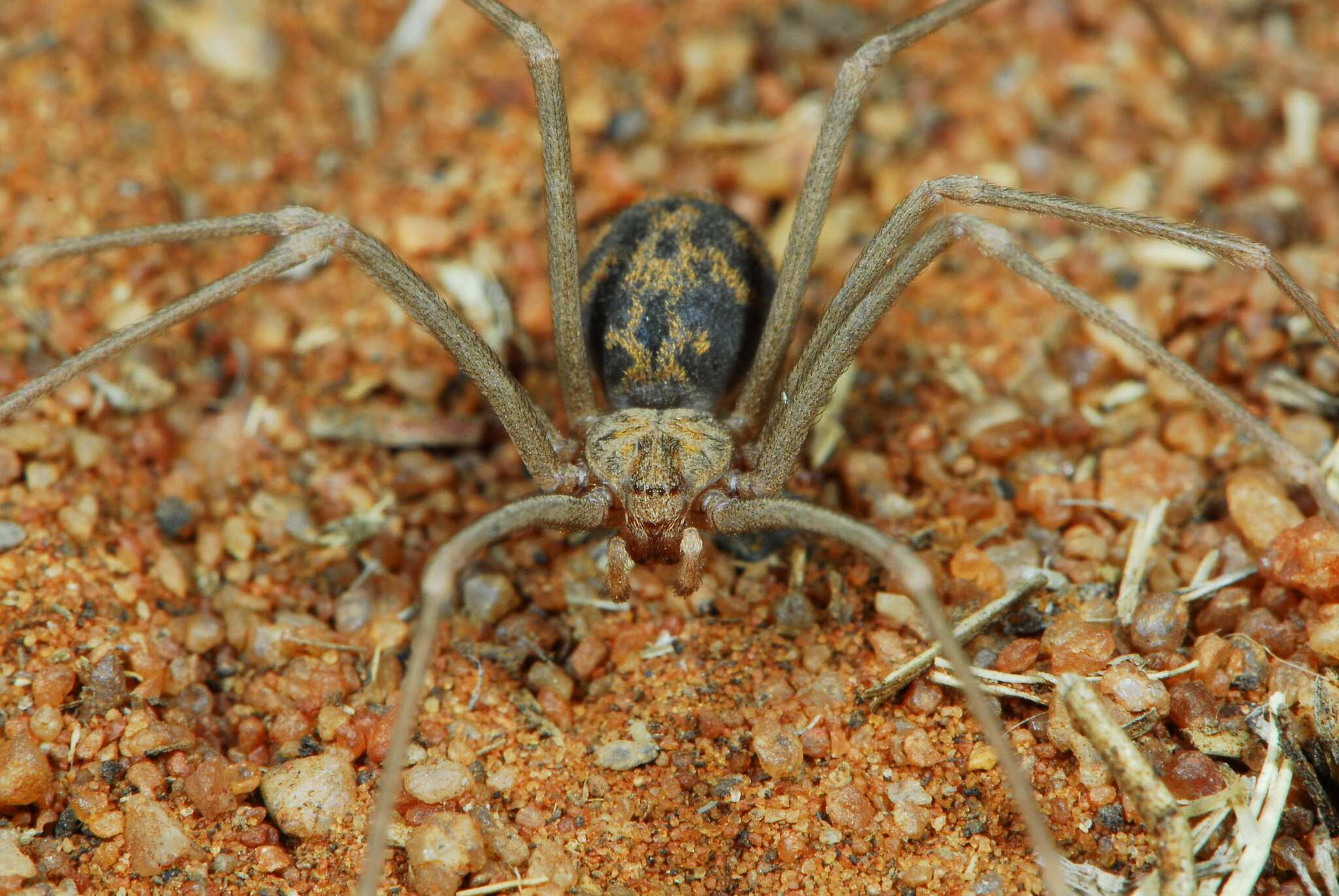
- Female

Scientific classification
- Kingdom: Animalia
- Phylum: Arthropoda
- Subphylum: Chelicerata
- Class: Arachnida
- Order: Araneae
- Infraorder: Araneomorphae
- Family: Sicariidae
- Genus: Loxosceles
- Species: L. simillima

Binomial name
- Loxosceles simillima Lawrence, 1927

Synonyms
- Loxosceles spiniceps Lawrence, 1952

= Loxosceles simillima =

Northern Violin Spider

Species of spider

Loxosceles simillima is a species of spider in the family Sicariidae. It occurs widely in southern Africa and is commonly known as the northern violin spider.

== Distribution ==
Loxosceles simillima occurs in Angola, Botswana, Democratic Republic of the Congo, Mozambique, Namibia, South Africa, Zambia, Zimbabwe, and Malawi. In South Africa, it is recorded from six provinces and occurs in more than 14 protected areas at altitudes ranging from 83 to 1816 m above sea level.

== Habitat and ecology ==
The species consists of ground dwellers that are not web bound and spin only a few irregular strands of silk serving as retreats. They are collected from under rocks, logs and bark, from inside termite mounds, leaf litter, caves and buildings. The species is found in the Grassland, Nama Karoo and Savanna biomes.

== Description ==
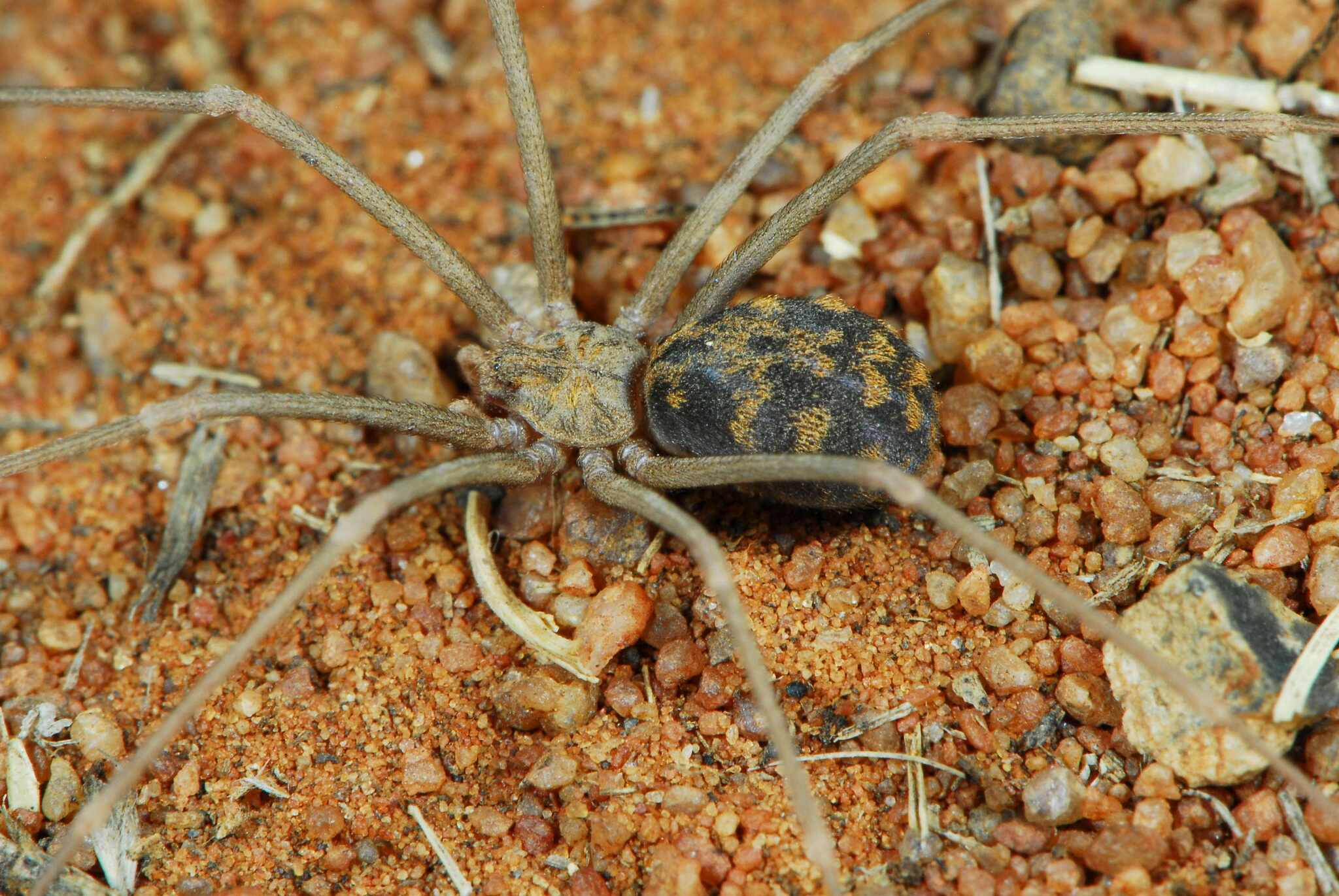
female

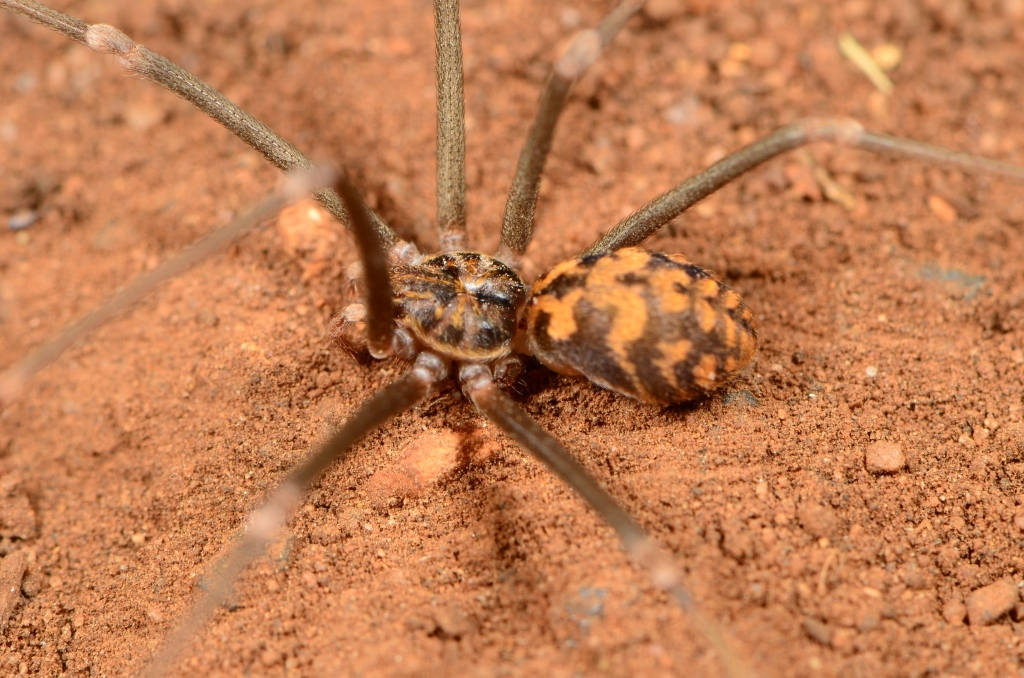
female

== Conservation ==
Loxosceles simillima is listed as Least Concern by the South African National Biodiversity Institute due to its wide geographical range. The species is protected in more than 14 protected areas.

== Taxonomy ==
The species was described by R. F. Lawrence in 1927 from Namibia. It has been revised by Lotz (2012, 2017) and synonymized with Loxosceles spiniceps Lawrence, 1952. The species is known from both sexes.
