= Loxosceles apachea =

Scientific classification
- Domain: Eukaryota
- Kingdom: Animalia
- Phylum: Arthropoda
- Subphylum: Chelicerata
- Class: Arachnida
- Order: Araneae
- Infraorder: Araneomorphae
- Family: Sicariidae
- Genus: Loxosceles
- Species: L. apachea

Binomial name
- Loxosceles apachea Gertsch & Ennik, 1983

Species of spider

Loxosceles apachea, the Apache recluse, is a species of recluse spider in the family Sicariidae that occurs in the United States and Mexico.
