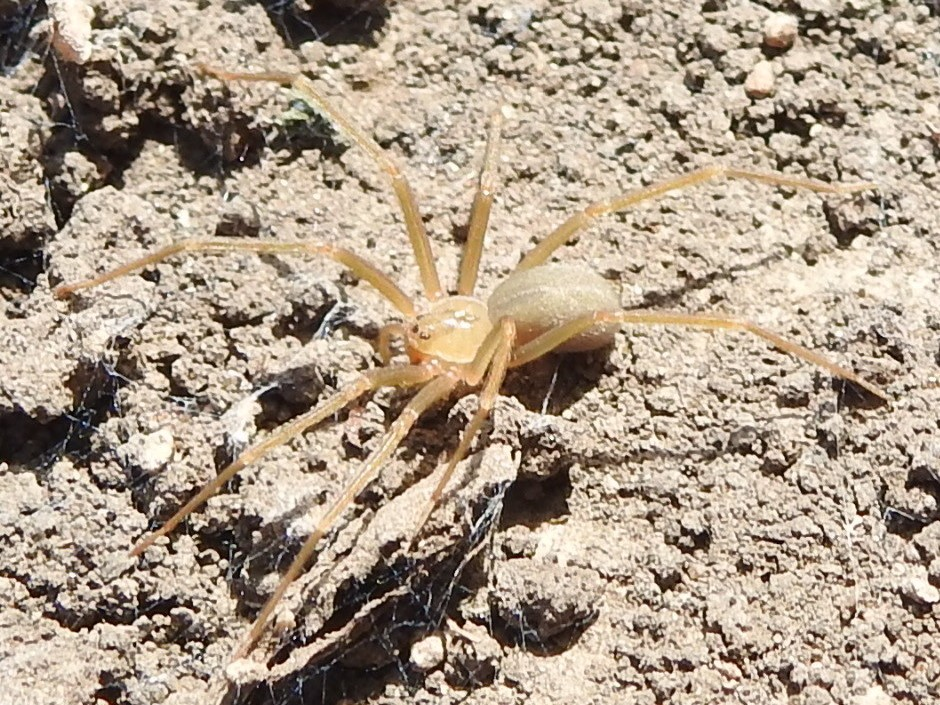

Scientific classification
- Domain: Eukaryota
- Kingdom: Animalia
- Phylum: Arthropoda
- Subphylum: Chelicerata
- Class: Arachnida
- Order: Araneae
- Infraorder: Araneomorphae
- Family: Sicariidae
- Genus: Loxosceles
- Species: L. blanda

Binomial name
- Loxosceles blanda Gertsch & Ennik, 1983

= Loxosceles blanda =

Species of spider

Loxosceles blanda, the Big Bend recluse, is a species of recluse spider in the family Sicariidae. It is found in the United States.
