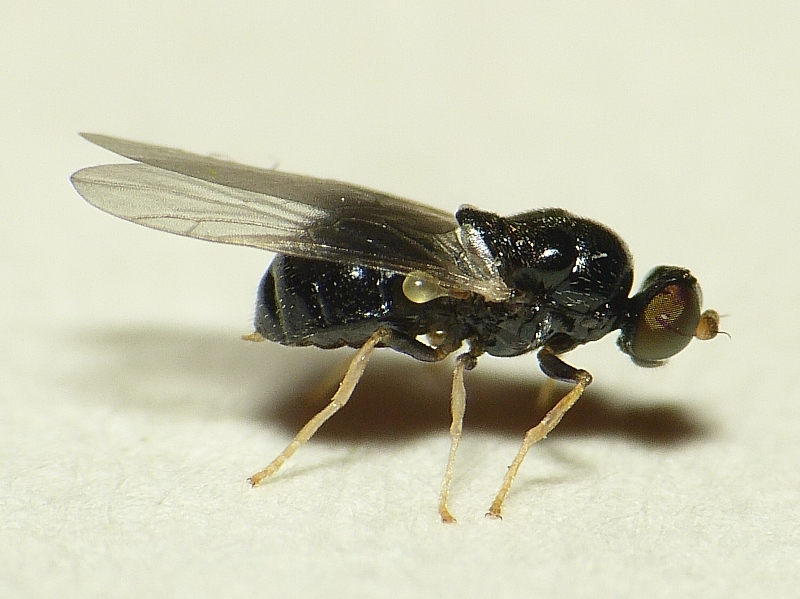

Scientific classification
- Kingdom: Animalia
- Phylum: Arthropoda
- Clade: Pancrustacea
- Class: Insecta
- Order: Diptera
- Family: Stratiomyidae
- Subfamily: Pachygastrinae
- Genus: Neopachygaster
- Species: N. meromelaena

Binomial name
- Neopachygaster meromelaena (Dufour, 1841)

Synonyms
- Pachygaster meromelas Dufour, 1841; Pachygaster orbitalis Wahlberg, 1854; Pachygaster meromelaena (Austen, 1901)

= Neopachygaster meromelaena =

Species of fly

Neopachygaster meromelaena, the silver-strips black, is a European species of soldier fly.

== Description ==
Diagnostic characters include:- Wing: R4 is missing.Dark face with silvery stripes. Antennae planted a little above the middle of the head height. Eyes widely spaced in both sexes.

== Distribution ==
Europe.
