= Neopachygaster maculicornis =

Scientific classification
- Kingdom: Animalia
- Phylum: Arthropoda
- Class: Insecta
- Order: Diptera
- Family: Stratiomyidae
- Subfamily: Pachygastrinae
- Genus: Neopachygaster
- Species: N. maculicornis

Binomial name
- Neopachygaster maculicornis (Hine, 1902)

Synonyms
- Pachygaster maculicornis Hine, 1902

Species of fly

Neopachygaster maculicornis is a species of soldier fly in the family Stratiomyidae.

== Distribution ==
Canada, United States.
