= Zabrachia magnicornis =

Scientific classification
- Kingdom: Animalia
- Phylum: Arthropoda
- Class: Insecta
- Order: Diptera
- Family: Stratiomyidae
- Subfamily: Pachygastrinae
- Genus: Zabrachia
- Species: Z. magnicornis

Binomial name
- Zabrachia magnicornis Cresson, 1919

Synonyms
- Zabrachia cornutum Kraft & Cook, 1961

Species of fly

Zabrachia magnicornis is a species of soldier fly in the family Stratiomyidae.
