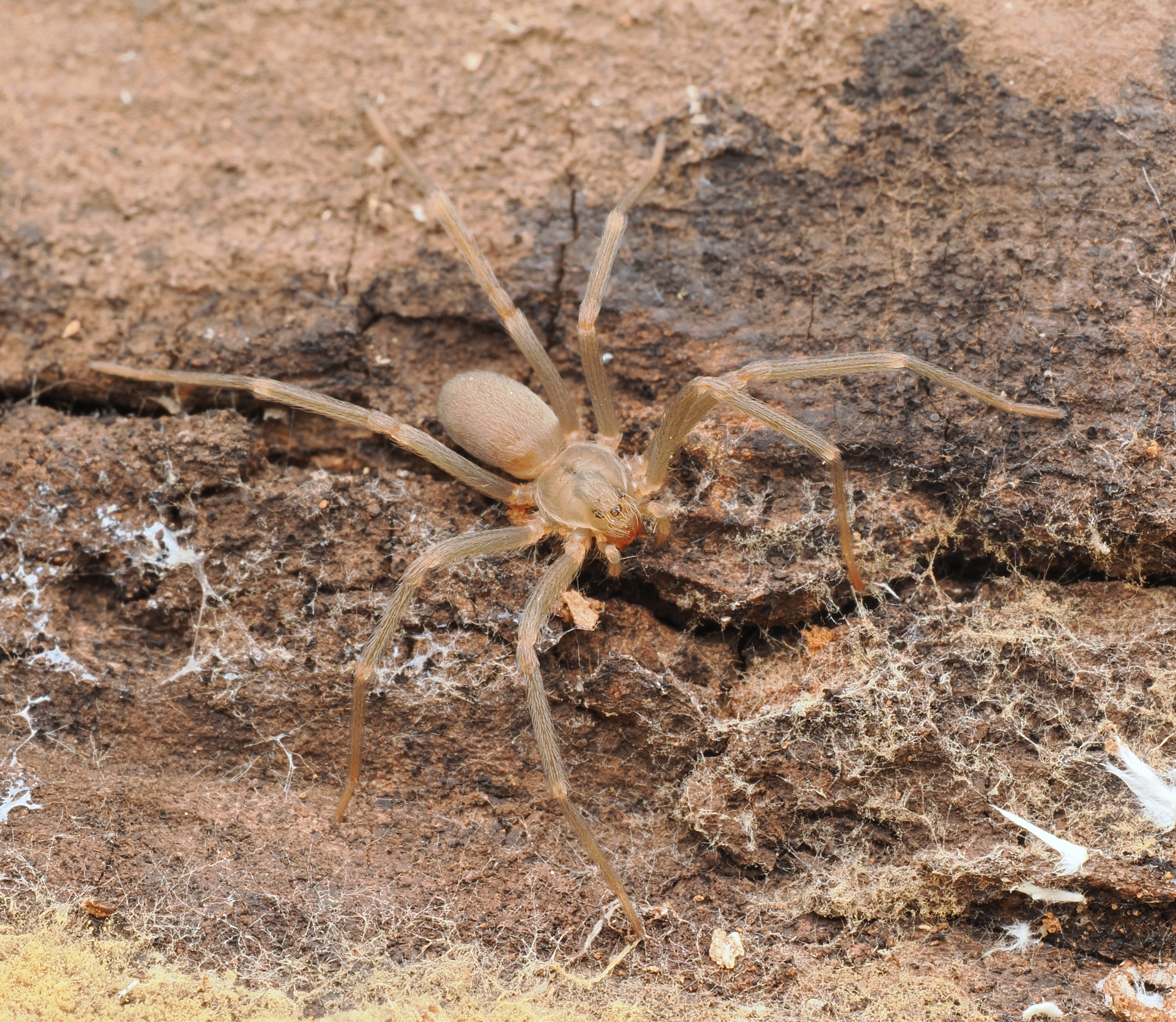
- L. devia from Texas

Scientific classification
- Kingdom: Animalia
- Phylum: Arthropoda
- Subphylum: Chelicerata
- Class: Arachnida
- Order: Araneae
- Infraorder: Araneomorphae
- Family: Sicariidae
- Genus: Loxosceles
- Species: L. devia

Binomial name
- Loxosceles devia Gertsch & Mulaik, 1940

= Loxosceles devia =

Species of spider

Loxosceles devia, the Texas recluse, is a species of recluse spider in the family Sicariidae. It is found in the United States and Mexico.
