= Loxosceles guatemala =

Scientific classification
- Kingdom: Animalia
- Phylum: Arthropoda
- Subphylum: Chelicerata
- Class: Arachnida
- Order: Araneae
- Infraorder: Araneomorphae
- Family: Sicariidae
- Genus: Loxosceles
- Species: L. guatemala

Binomial name
- Loxosceles guatemala Gertsch, 1973

Species of recluse spider

Loxosceles guatemala is a species of recluse spider found in caves located in Guatemala. Related to Loxosceles yucatana but can be distinguished by its epigyne which are described as being broad with narrow separated pouches each with one erect apically enlarged receptacle and two short outside fingers.

== Description ==
It was described from a female holotype found in a cave in Lanquín, Alta Verapaz in Guatemala. Its length was 9.8mm with a carapace 4.2mm long and 3.4mm wide and with an Abdomen 5.6mm long and 3.5mm wide. It is bright orange with dusky brown markings on the carapace and a whitish abdomen covered with dusky hairs.
