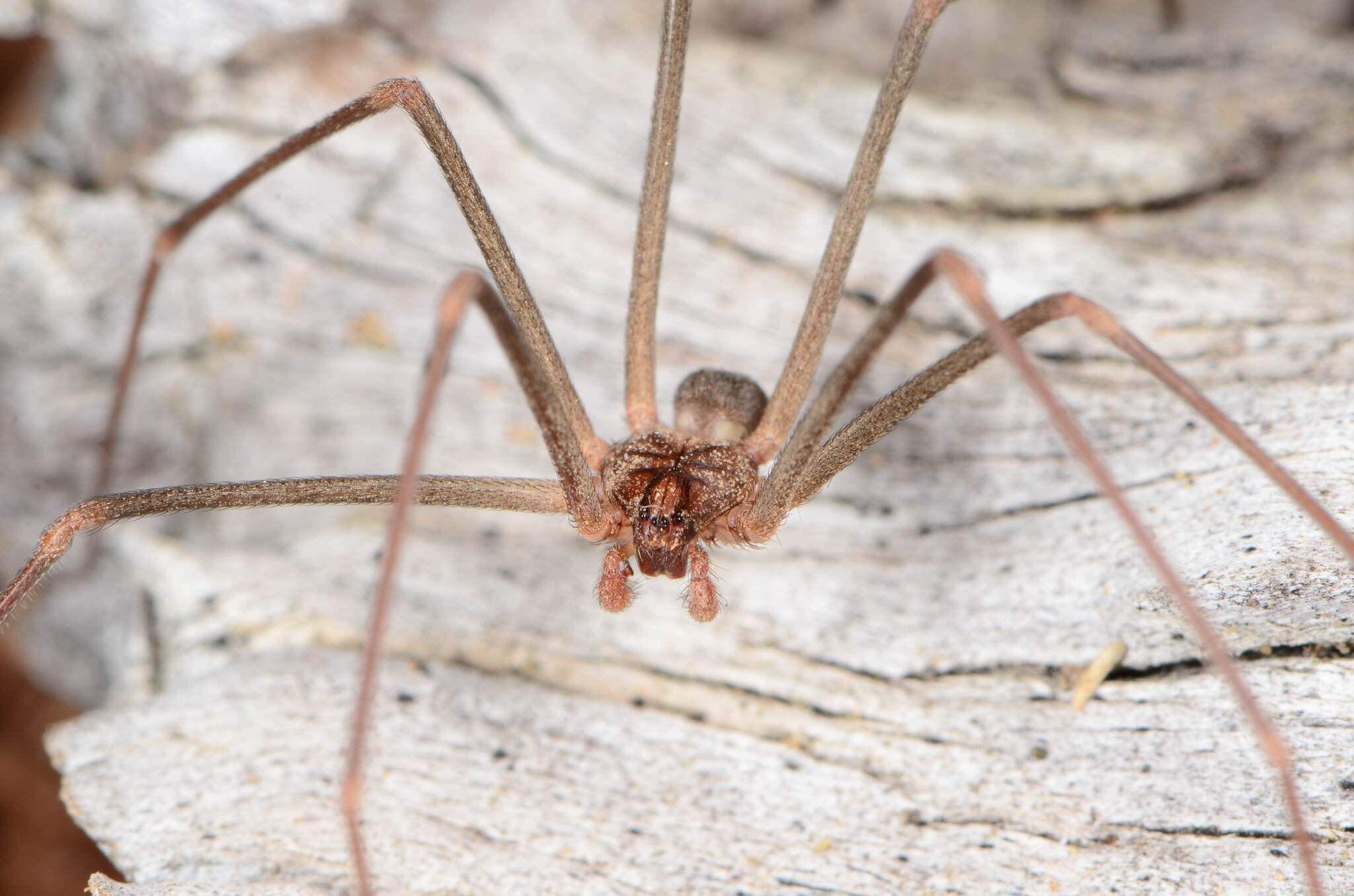
- Male
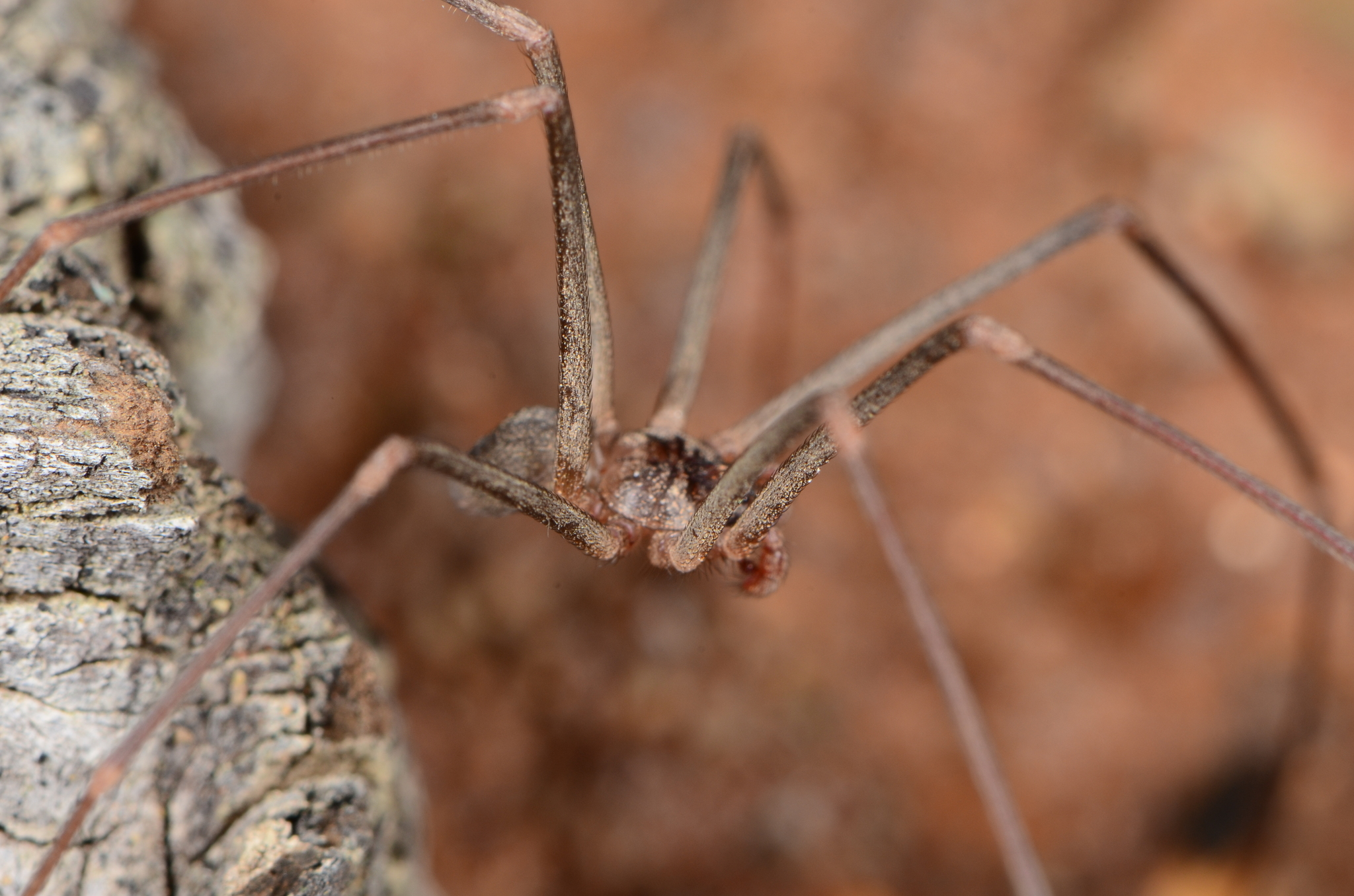
- Male

Scientific classification
- Kingdom: Animalia
- Phylum: Arthropoda
- Subphylum: Chelicerata
- Class: Arachnida
- Order: Araneae
- Infraorder: Araneomorphae
- Family: Sicariidae
- Genus: Loxosceles
- Species: L. spinulosa

Binomial name
- Loxosceles spinulosa Purcell, 1904

= Loxosceles spinulosa =

Southern Violin Spider

Species of spider

Loxosceles spinulosa is a species of spider in the family Sicariidae. It is endemic to South Africa and is commonly known as the southern violin spider.

== Distribution ==
Loxosceles spinulosa is recorded from two southern provinces of South Africa, the Eastern Cape and Western Cape. It occurs at altitudes ranging from 15 to 987 m above sea level.

== Habitat and ecology ==
The species is not web bound and spins only a few irregular strands of silk serving as retreats. It is found in the Fynbos and Thicket biomes.

== Description ==
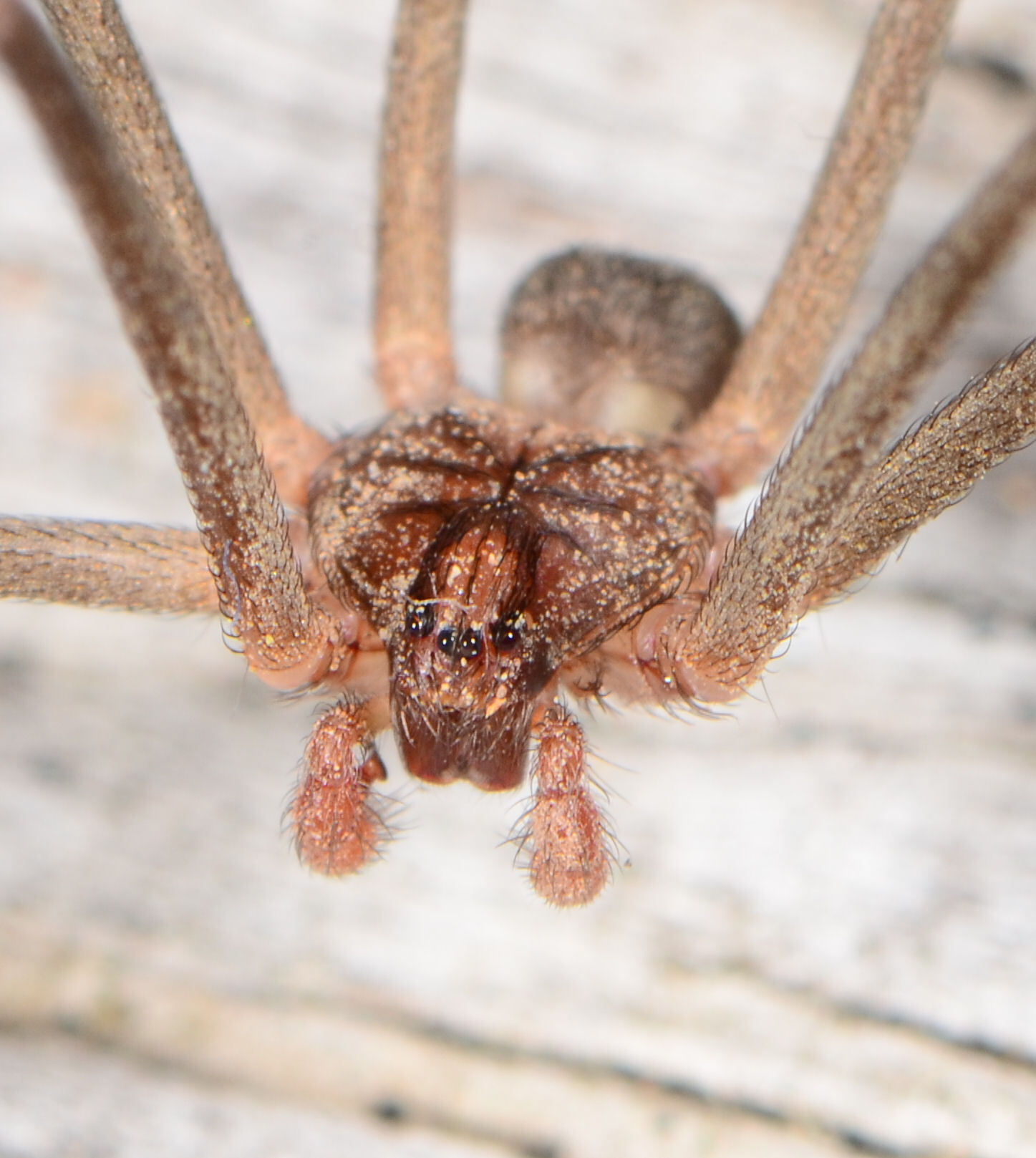
male

== Conservation ==
Loxosceles spinulosa is listed as Least Concern by the South African National Biodiversity Institute due to its wide geographical range. The species is protected in De Hoop Nature Reserve, Swartberg Nature Reserve, Great Fish River Reserve and Aardvark Nature Reserve.

== Taxonomy ==
The species was described by W. F. Purcell in 1904 from Swellendam Pass in the Western Cape. It has been revised by Lotz (2012, 2017) and is known from both sexes.
