= Loxosceles speluncarum =

Gauteng Cave Violin Spider

Conservation status
- Vulnerable (SANBI Red List)

Scientific classification
- Kingdom: Animalia
- Phylum: Arthropoda
- Subphylum: Chelicerata
- Class: Arachnida
- Order: Araneae
- Infraorder: Araneomorphae
- Family: Sicariidae
- Genus: Loxosceles
- Species: L. speluncarum

Binomial name
- Loxosceles speluncarum Simon, 1893

Species of spider

Loxosceles speluncarum is a species of recluse spider in the family Sicariidae. It is endemic to Gauteng province of South Africa and is commonly known as the Gauteng cave violin spider.

== Distribution ==
Loxosceles speluncarum is known only from three cave complexes in the Pretoria area of Gauteng province at altitudes ranging from 1262 to 1498 m above sea level.

== Habitat and ecology ==
Loxosceles speluncarum is a troglobite cave species that is more abundant in totally dark areas where they have been recorded from crevices or wandering around on cave walls.

== Description ==
This species of recluse spider features a black violin shape on its back. Specimens in captivity from the Letaba district bear distinct black markings down the dorsal length of their abdomen.

== Conservation ==
Loxosceles speluncarum is listed as Vulnerable under criterion D2 by the South African National Biodiversity Institute. The species is known from fewer than three extant locations and is potentially threatened by disturbance of its specialist cave habitat. Surveys about twenty years after the first recordings showed that this species has completely disappeared from two of the caves (Apies River Caves and Monument Caves) and is under severe threat of disappearing from the third cave (Wonderboom Caves). The population in Wonderboom Nature Reserve appears to be protected and safe for the immediate future.

== Etymology ==
The specific name speluncarum refers to caves, from the Latin "spelunca" meaning cave.

== Taxonomy ==
The species was described by Eugène Simon in 1893 from Fountain Caves, Pretoria. It has been revised by Lotz (2012, 2017) and is known from both sexes.

Due to the distance between habitats where this species of spider is found, the influence of the mechanism of gene flow is unknown.
