= Loxosceles accepta =

Scientific classification
- Kingdom: Animalia
- Phylum: Arthropoda
- Subphylum: Chelicerata
- Class: Arachnida
- Order: Araneae
- Infraorder: Araneomorphae
- Family: Sicariidae
- Genus: Loxosceles
- Species: L. accepta

Binomial name
- Loxosceles accepta Gertsch, 1967

Species of venomous recluse spider

Loxosceles accepta is a species of venomous recluse spider in the family Sicariidae. It is native to Peru. The coloration of L. accepta is similar to the coloration of L. laeta. It is readily identifiable by features of the male and female genitalia.
