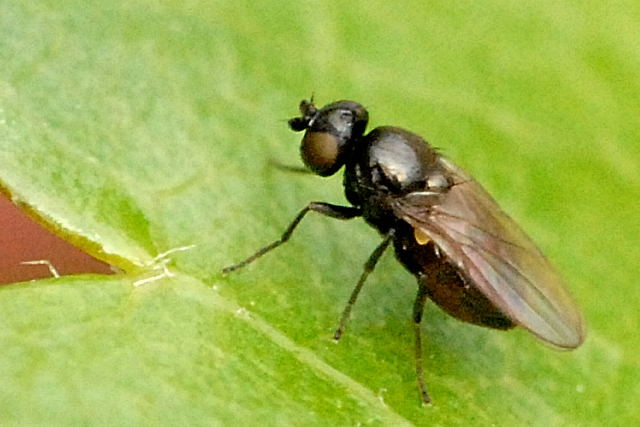
- Zabrachia tenella

Scientific classification
- Kingdom: Animalia
- Phylum: Arthropoda
- Clade: Pancrustacea
- Class: Insecta
- Order: Diptera
- Family: Stratiomyidae
- Subfamily: Pachygastrinae
- Genus: Zabrachia; Coquillett, 1901

Type species
- Zabrachia polita Coquillett, 1901

Synonyms
- Zabrachria Enderlein, 1921

= Zabrachia =

Genus of flies

Zabrachia is a genus of soldier flies in the family Stratiomyidae. Adults can be distinguished from other Pachygastrinae by the fused R_{4} and R_{5} wing veins. Females have been collected during oviposition into pine wood, and larvae are known to live under the bark of coniferous trees, including lodgepole pine, ponderosa pine, and Douglas fir.

== Species ==
- Zabrachia albipilum Kraft & Cook, 1961
- Zabrachia annulifemur Brunetti, 1920
- Zabrachia barbata James, 1980
- Zabrachia beameri Kraft & Cook, 1961
- Zabrachia hebicornutum Kraft & Cook, 1961
- Zabrachia knowltoni Kraft & Cook, 1961
- Zabrachia latigena James, 1980
- Zabrachia lopha Kraft & Cook, 1961
- Zabrachia madagascariensis Lindner, 1959
- Zabrachia magnicornis Cresson, 1919
- Zabrachia mexicana James, 1980
- Zabrachia minutissima (Zetterstedt, 1838)
- Zabrachia occidentalis Rozkošný & Báez, 1983
- Zabrachia parvum Kraft & Cook, 1961
- Zabrachia plicatum Kraft & Cook, 1961
- Zabrachia polita Coquillett, 1901
- Zabrachia pusilla James, 1980
- Zabrachia stoichoides James, 1965
- Zabrachia tenella (Jaennicke, 1866)
- Zabrachia yuccae James, 1965
