= Loxosceles coheni =

Scientific classification
- Kingdom: Animalia
- Phylum: Arthropoda
- Subphylum: Chelicerata
- Class: Arachnida
- Order: Araneae
- Infraorder: Araneomorphae
- Family: Sicariidae
- Genus: Loxosceles
- Species: L. coheni

Binomial name
- Loxosceles coheni Zamani, Mirshamsi & Marusik, 2021

Species of spider

Loxosceles coheni is a species of spider in the Sicariidae family native to Iran, described in 2021. The species is named after the Canadian singer-songwriter, poet and novelist Leonard Cohen.
