= Neopachygaster caucasica =

Scientific classification
- Kingdom: Animalia
- Phylum: Arthropoda
- Class: Insecta
- Order: Diptera
- Family: Stratiomyidae
- Subfamily: Pachygastrinae
- Genus: Neopachygaster
- Species: N. caucasica

Binomial name
- Neopachygaster caucasica Krivosheina, 2004

Species of fly

Neopachygaster caucasica is a species of soldier fly in the family Stratiomyidae.

== Distribution ==
Azerbaijan.
