= Loxosceles cederbergensis =

Scientific classification
- Kingdom: Animalia
- Phylum: Arthropoda
- Subphylum: Chelicerata
- Class: Arachnida
- Order: Araneae
- Infraorder: Araneomorphae
- Family: Sicariidae
- Genus: Loxosceles
- Species: L. cederbergensis

Binomial name
- Loxosceles cederbergensis Lotz, 2017

Species of spider

Loxosceles cederbergensis is a species of spider in the family Sicariidae. It is endemic to the Western Cape province of South Africa.

== Distribution ==
Loxosceles cederbergensis is known only from different localities in the Cederberg Wilderness Area in the Western Cape, at altitudes ranging from 243 to 1523 m above sea level.

== Habitat and ecology ==
The species is a ground dweller found in the Fynbos biome. Specimens were sampled with pitfall traps in the Cederberg Wilderness Area, mainly between 92 and 1660 m above sea level.

== Conservation ==
Loxosceles cederbergensis is listed as Data Deficient due to taxonomic reasons. More sampling is needed to collect males and determine the species' range. The species is protected in the Cederberg Wilderness Area.

== Etymology ==
The specific name cederbergensis refers to the Cederberg mountain range where the species was discovered.

== Taxonomy ==
The species was described by Leon N. Lotz in 2017 from Aan Het Berg in the Cederberg Wilderness Area. It is known only from females, with males remaining to be discovered.
