= Loxosceles arizonica =

Scientific classification
- Domain: Eukaryota
- Kingdom: Animalia
- Phylum: Arthropoda
- Subphylum: Chelicerata
- Class: Arachnida
- Order: Araneae
- Infraorder: Araneomorphae
- Family: Sicariidae
- Genus: Loxosceles
- Species: L. arizonica

Binomial name
- Loxosceles arizonica Gertsch & Mulaik, 1940

Species of spider

Loxosceles arizonica, known as the Arizona brown spider, is a species of spider in the family Sicariidae. Field studies suggest that ants are its major prey, especially ants of the genera Novomessor and Camponotus.
