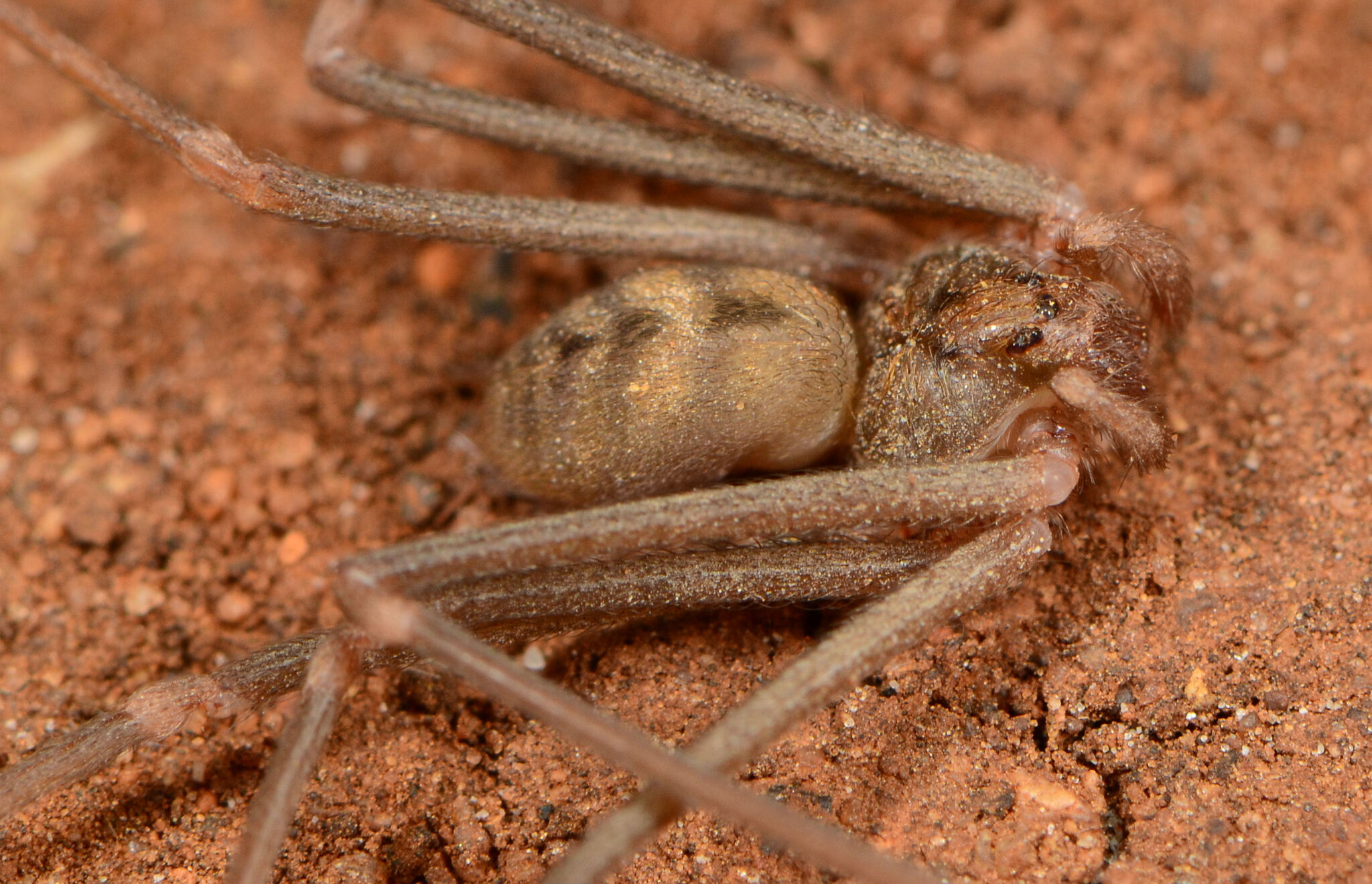
- Female
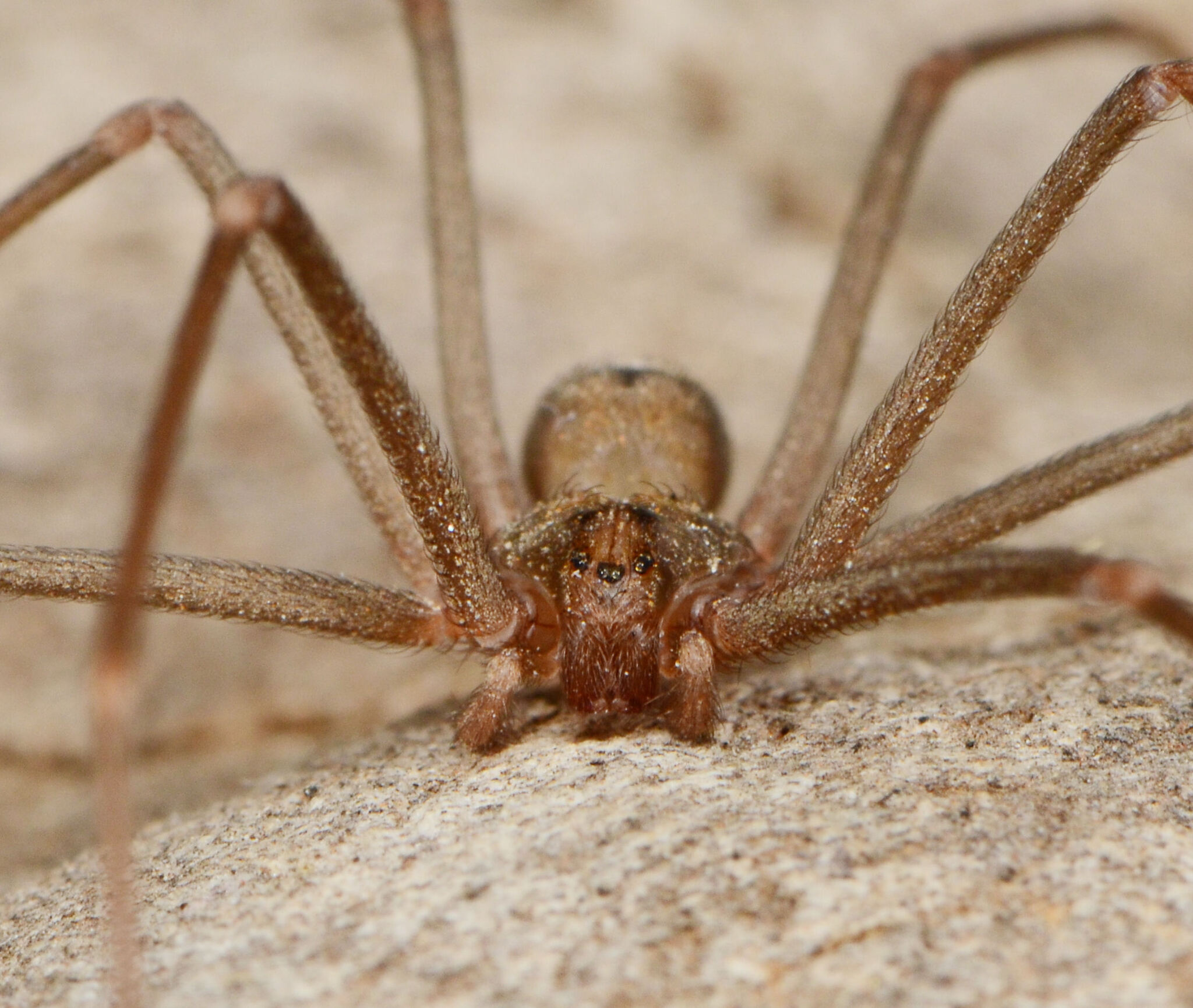
- Female

Scientific classification
- Kingdom: Animalia
- Phylum: Arthropoda
- Subphylum: Chelicerata
- Class: Arachnida
- Order: Araneae
- Infraorder: Araneomorphae
- Family: Sicariidae
- Genus: Loxosceles
- Species: L. parramae

Binomial name
- Loxosceles parramae Newlands, 1981

= Loxosceles parramae =

Parram's Violin Spider

Species of spider

Loxosceles parramae is a species of spider in the family Sicariidae. It is endemic to South Africa and is commonly known as Parram's violin spider.

== Distribution ==
Loxosceles parramae is known from two provinces in South Africa, the Free State and Gauteng. It occurs at altitudes ranging from 1194 to 2158 m above sea level.

== Habitat and ecology ==
The species was introduced in human homes and mines in South Africa and is found in cracks and crevices in stone foundations or in houses where it takes refuge in dark corners of cupboards and drawers. It is collected from the Grassland biome and found under rocks, in caves and buildings.

== Description ==
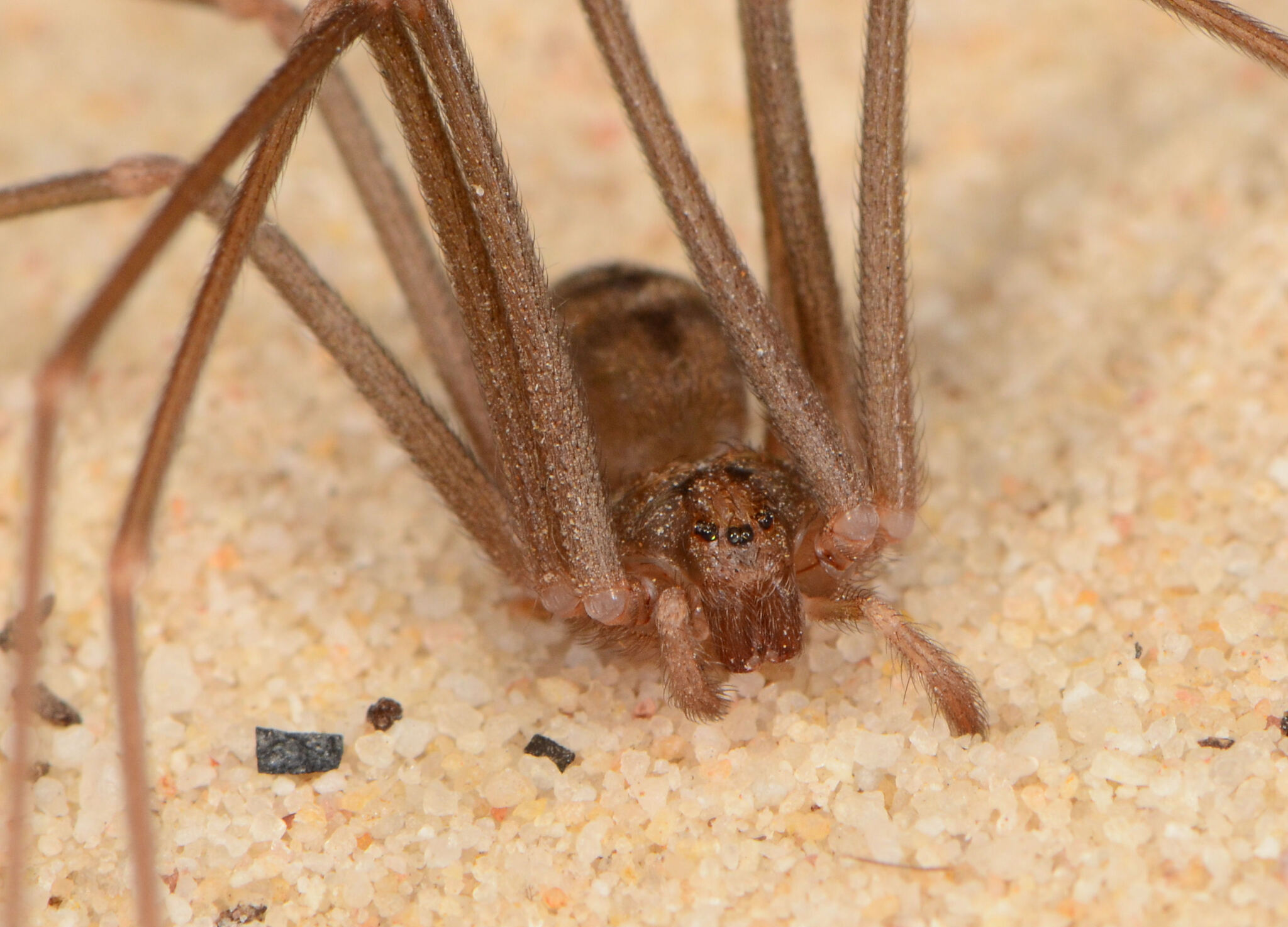
female

== Conservation ==
Loxosceles parramae is listed as Least Concern by the South African National Biodiversity Institute due to its wide geographical range. The species is protected in Amanzi Private Game Reserve, Mpetsane Conservation Estate and Groenkloof Nature Reserve.

== Etymology ==
The species is named after Sheila Parram, as indicated by the original description which used the matronym "parrami" (corrected to "parramae" according to ICZN Article 32.5.1).

== Taxonomy ==
The species was described by G. Newlands in 1981 from Bellevue, Johannesburg in Gauteng. The original name "parrami" was a lapsus calami and was corrected to "parramae". The species has been revised by Lotz (2012, 2017) and is known from both sexes.
