= Zabrachia polita =

Scientific classification
- Kingdom: Animalia
- Phylum: Arthropoda
- Class: Insecta
- Order: Diptera
- Family: Stratiomyidae
- Subfamily: Pachygastrinae
- Genus: Zabrachia
- Species: Z. polita

Binomial name
- Zabrachia polita Coquillett, 1901

Species of fly

Zabrachia polita is a species of soldier fly in the family Stratiomyidae.
