= Loxosceles sonora =

Scientific classification
- Kingdom: Animalia
- Phylum: Arthropoda
- Subphylum: Chelicerata
- Class: Arachnida
- Order: Araneae
- Infraorder: Araneomorphae
- Family: Sicariidae
- Genus: Loxosceles
- Species: L. sonora

Binomial name
- Loxosceles sonora Gertsch and Ennik, 1983

Species of venomous brown recluse spiders

Loxosceles sonora is a species of venomous recluse spider in the family Sicariidae. It is a relative of the species L. deserta via allopatric speciation. The etymology of the species name is the Mexican state of Sonora. They are also found in the neighboring state of Sinaloa.
