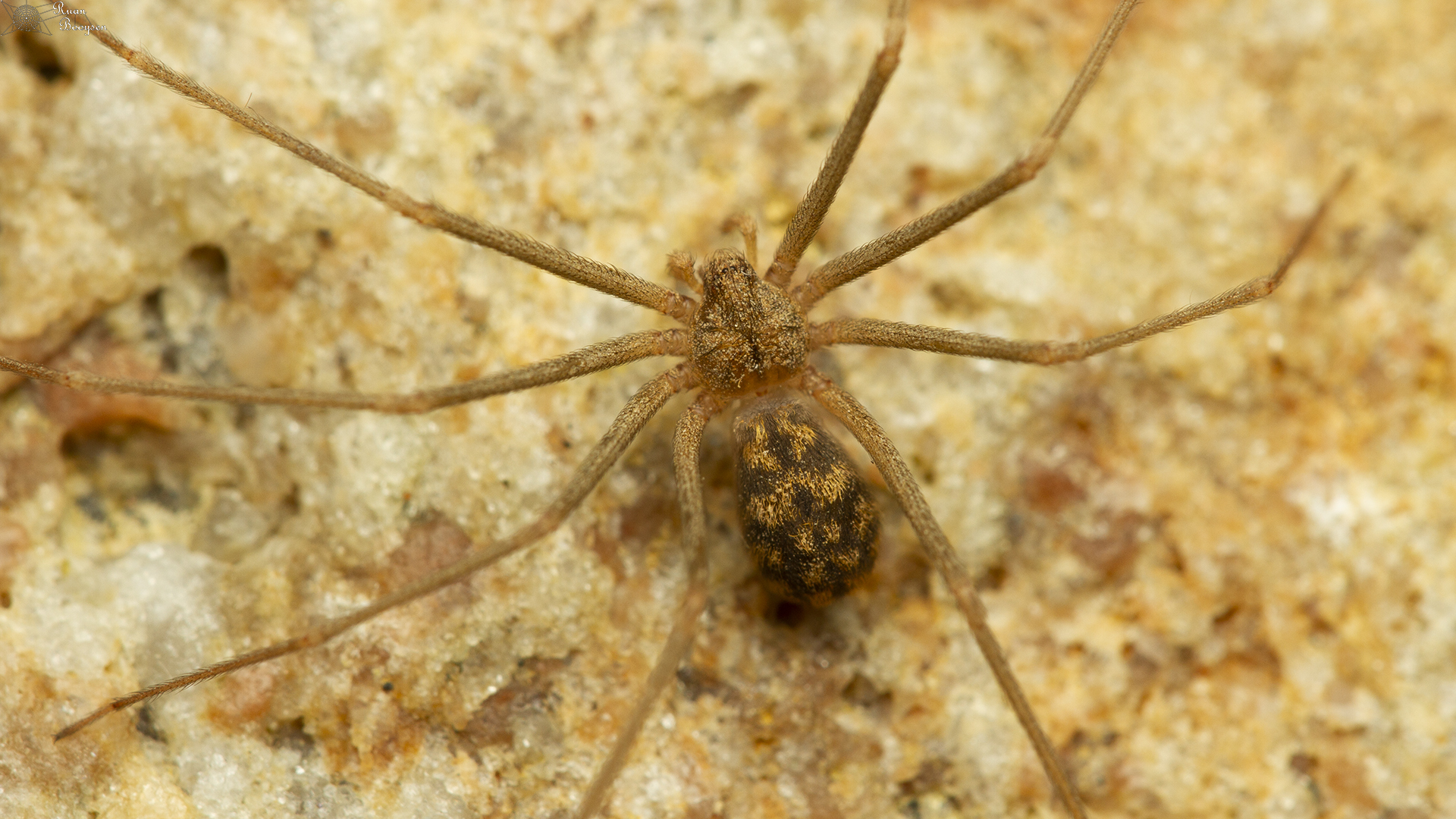
- female

Scientific classification
- Kingdom: Animalia
- Phylum: Arthropoda
- Subphylum: Chelicerata
- Class: Arachnida
- Order: Araneae
- Infraorder: Araneomorphae
- Family: Sicariidae
- Genus: Loxosceles
- Species: L. pilosa

Binomial name
- Loxosceles pilosa Purcell, 1908

= Loxosceles pilosa =

Steinkopf Violin Spider

Species of spider

Loxosceles pilosa is a species of spider in the family Sicariidae. It occurs in southern Africa and is commonly known as the Steinkopf violin spider.

== Distribution ==
Loxosceles pilosa occurs in Namibia and South Africa. In South Africa, it is recorded only from the Northern Cape province at altitudes ranging from 63 to 870 m above sea level.

== Habitat and ecology ==
The species is commonly found beneath small stones on sandy loam soils in the Desert and Nama Karoo biomes. It has also been found at several localities in the dunes where it hides amongst grass clusters during the day.

== Conservation ==
Loxosceles pilosa is listed as Least Concern by the South African National Biodiversity Institute due to its wide geographical range in southern Africa. The species is protected in the Richtersveld Transfrontier National Park.

== Etymology ==
The specific name pilosa is Latin for "hairy".

== Taxonomy ==
The species was described by W. F. Purcell in 1908 from Steinkopf in the Northern Cape. It has been revised by Lotz (2012, 2017) and is known from both sexes.
