= Loxosceles haddadi =

Scientific classification
- Kingdom: Animalia
- Phylum: Arthropoda
- Subphylum: Chelicerata
- Class: Arachnida
- Order: Araneae
- Infraorder: Araneomorphae
- Family: Sicariidae
- Genus: Loxosceles
- Species: L. haddadi

Binomial name
- Loxosceles haddadi Leon N. Lotz, 2017

Species of spider

Loxosceles haddadi is a species of spider in the family Sicariidae. It is endemic to Limpopo province of South Africa.

== Distribution ==
Loxosceles haddadi is known only from the type locality at Lhuvhondo Nature Reserve in Limpopo province at 1341 m above sea level.

== Habitat and ecology ==
The species is a ground dweller collected from under rocks in the Savanna biome.

== Conservation ==
Loxosceles haddadi is listed as Data Deficient due to taxonomic reasons. The species is known only from the type locality and its status remains obscure. More sampling is needed to collect females and determine the species' range. The species is protected in Lhuvhondo Nature Reserve.

== Etymology ==
The species is named after Charles R. Haddad, a South African arachnologist who has made significant contributions to spider research in southern Africa.

== Taxonomy ==
The species was described by Leon N. Lotz in 2017 from Lhuvhondo Nature Reserve. It is known only from males, with females remaining to be discovered.
