= Loxosceles dejagerae =

Marie's Violin Spider

Conservation status
- Least Concern (SANBI Red List)

Scientific classification
- Kingdom: Animalia
- Phylum: Arthropoda
- Subphylum: Chelicerata
- Class: Arachnida
- Order: Araneae
- Infraorder: Araneomorphae
- Family: Sicariidae
- Genus: Loxosceles
- Species: L. dejagerae

Binomial name
- Loxosceles dejagerae Lotz, 2017

Species of spider

Loxosceles dejagerae is a species of spider in the family Sicariidae. It is endemic to South Africa and is commonly known as Marie's violin spider.

== Distribution ==
Loxosceles dejagerae is known from three provinces in South Africa, the Eastern Cape, Northern Cape, and Western Cape. It occurs at altitudes ranging from 55 to 1287 m above sea level.

== Habitat and ecology ==
The species is a ground dweller found in the Fynbos and Thicket biomes.

== Conservation ==
Loxosceles dejagerae is listed as Least Concern by the South African National Biodiversity Institute due to its wide geographical range. The species is protected in the Swartberg Nature Reserve at the type locality.

== Etymology ==
The specific name dejagerae honors South African photographer Marie de Jager.

== Taxonomy ==
The species was described by Leon N. Lotz in 2017 from the Swartberg Nature Reserve (originally listed as Gamkaskloof Nature Reserve). It is known from both sexes.
