= Loxosceles palma =

Scientific classification
- Kingdom: Animalia
- Phylum: Arthropoda
- Subphylum: Chelicerata
- Class: Arachnida
- Order: Araneae
- Infraorder: Araneomorphae
- Family: Sicariidae
- Genus: Loxosceles
- Species: L. palma

Binomial name
- Loxosceles palma Gertsch, 1983

Species of venomous recluse spider

Loxosceles palma is a species of venomous recluse spider in the family Sicariidae. It is native to Baja California, Mexico. The species name palma comes from the Latin word for palm, and was named as such after the palm canyons in both California, and Baja California.

L. palma mainly inhabits deep canyons, such as the San Jacinto Mountains, in California. They tend to hide under rocks.
