= Loxosceles makapanensis =

Scientific classification
- Kingdom: Animalia
- Phylum: Arthropoda
- Subphylum: Chelicerata
- Class: Arachnida
- Order: Araneae
- Infraorder: Araneomorphae
- Family: Sicariidae
- Genus: Loxosceles
- Species: L. makapanensis

Binomial name
- Loxosceles makapanensis Lotz, 2017

Species of spider

Loxosceles makapanensis is a species of spider in the family Sicariidae. It is endemic to Limpopo province of South Africa.

== Distribution ==
Loxosceles makapanensis is known only from two localities in Makapan Valley, Limpopo province, at altitudes ranging from 1404 to 1911 m above sea level.

== Habitat and ecology ==
The species is a ground dweller collected from caves in the Savanna biome.

== Description ==
While not much is known about this species due to a low amount of sightings and its recent founding, they share many common characteristics with other recluse spiders. These traits include having six eyes arranged in three pairs, small fine body hairs, and a long-legged silhouette seen in other spiders of the loxosceles genus. They also possess a rather flat cephalothorax. These spiders also share the characteristic cytotoxic venom that gives this genus its reputation.

== Conservation ==
Loxosceles makapanensis is listed as Data Deficient due to taxonomic reasons. The species is known only from two localities in Makapan Valley and its status remains obscure. More sampling is needed to collect males and determine the species' range.

== Etymology ==
The specific name makapanensis refers to the Makapan Valley where the species was discovered.

== Taxonomy ==
The species was described by Leon N. Lotz in 2017 from the Ficus Cave in Makapan Valley. It is known only from females, with males remaining to be discovered.
