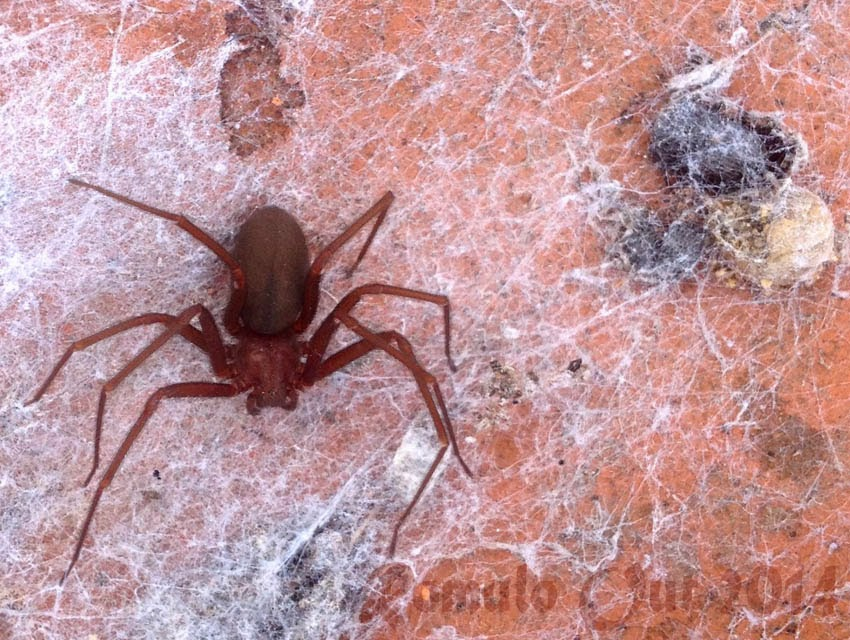

Scientific classification
- Kingdom: Animalia
- Phylum: Arthropoda
- Subphylum: Chelicerata
- Class: Arachnida
- Order: Araneae
- Infraorder: Araneomorphae
- Family: Sicariidae
- Genus: Loxosceles
- Species: L. intermedia

Binomial name
- Loxosceles intermedia Mello-Leitão, 1934

Synonyms
- Loxosceles ornatus Mello-Leitão, 1938; Loxosceles ornata Mello-Leitão, 1941

= Loxosceles intermedia =

Species of spider

Loxosceles intermedia, the Brazilian brown recluse spider, is a highly venomous spider species in the family Sicariidae native to Brazil and Argentina.

== Description ==
The male has a total length of 5.3 mm, legs I to IV, have a length of 24.5, 31.8, 20.4 and 23.6 mm, the palp can be 5.4 mm long, females are larger, measuring about 8.5 mm in length, with legs ranging from 15.1, 16.0, 13.1 and 15, 5 mm, the palp of females measures 3.8 mm.

Both male and female carapace ranges from dull yellow to orange brown, covered with black and subpretiated bristles. The cephalica pars varies from dark orange-brown to reddish-brown, with a '' U '' shape contrasting with the yellowish pars thoracica. The tubers of the eyes are enlarged, while the lateral marens are not dark, the abdomen is grayish or blackened, with the dorsal part darker than the ventral part, the leg segments vary from orange-brown to reddish-brown.

== Behavior ==
It is a very shy spider, with nocturnal habits, building irregular webs under fallen tree trunks and debris, usually in dark places. They can also be found in human environments, in socks, clothes, blankets, wardrobes, garages and among others dark places. Their food, as well as that of several recluse spiders, is based on insects such as cockroaches, crickets and beetles. They have been reported to attack other arthropods such as scorpions. It breeds in the hottest months of the year, laying about 20 eggs taking 46 days for the juveniles to hatch. The female builds a bag-shaped web where the eggs are deposited.

== Range ==
Loxosceles intermedia is native to Brazil and Argentina. They are found in temperate and warm regions of South America in southeastern and southern Brazil, as well as northern Argentina. They live in dark, very dry cracks, warm regions with elevations below 500 m, quite common around or inside the houses of humans.

== Bites to humans ==
As well as the Chilean recluse spider, the venom of Loxosceles intermedia has a high concentration of the enzyme sphingomyelinase D. responsible for local and systemic effects, and is one of the main species attributed to deaths in South America, since the systemic effects of the bite occur frequently. The symptoms are not immediate, which leads the victim to believe that the bite was mild. They usually take hours to manifest, and begins with severe pain, redness, inflammation and blisters, in more severe cases evolving to tissue necrosis. Systemic effects, include hemolysis, cardiac problems, vascular collapse and kidney failure. Loxosceles intermedia bite is also capable of inducing severe thrombocytopenia, increased fibrinogen, reduced clotting factor VII, disseminated intravascular coagulation and severe bleeding. The venom is also capable of inducing myofibril necrosis and leukocyte infiltration causing damage to skeletal muscle. Thrombocytopenia is an important clinical sign for diagnosing L. intermedia bites. Moderate symptoms such as nausea, vomiting, fever and muscle pain are common with Loxosceles bites, especially from this species. The minimum necrotic dose is 2.4 μg / kg.

The lethal dose for four strains of mice ranges from 4.6-24.5 μg. Venom causes dermonecrotic lesions in humans and rabbits, however, rats do not develop this type of lesion. The recombinant toxin Loxtox rLiD1 from the L. intermedia venom is responsible for the cardiotoxic effects, and a significant increase in density I (Ca, L), and intracellular Ca (2+) transients respectively. A sphingomyelinase D protein also plays a key role in cardiac dysfunction. L. intermedia can produce 5.6 mg of venom, the male produces less, around 2.43 mg. While 40 μg of the venom proteins corresponds to the average amount inoculated by the spider.
