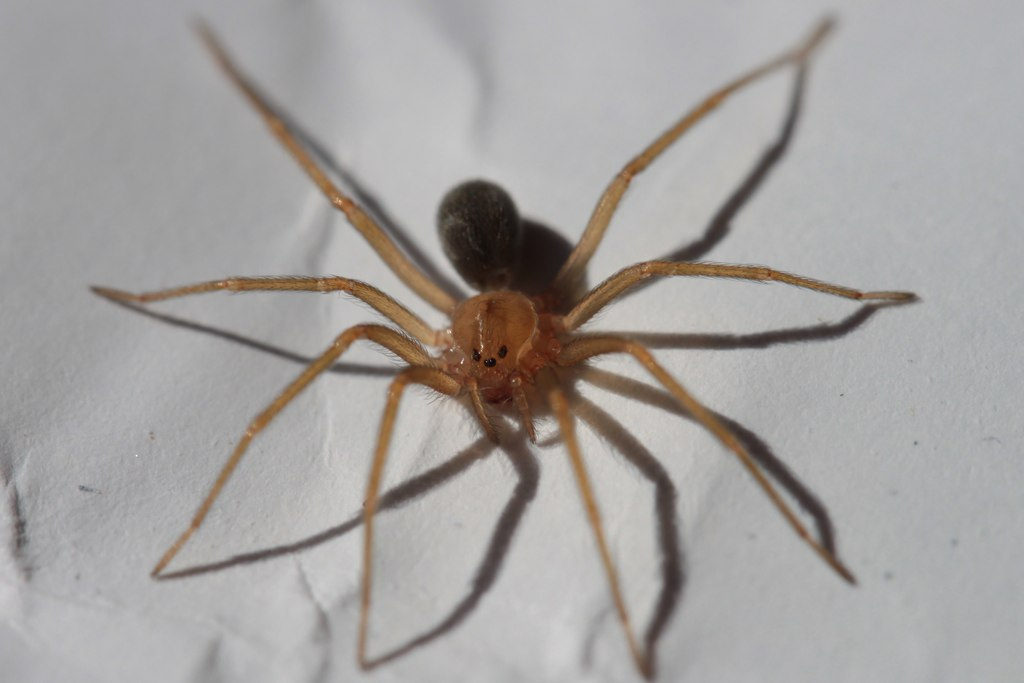

Scientific classification
- Kingdom: Animalia
- Phylum: Arthropoda
- Subphylum: Chelicerata
- Class: Arachnida
- Order: Araneae
- Infraorder: Araneomorphae
- Family: Sicariidae
- Genus: Loxosceles
- Species: L. gaucho

Binomial name
- Loxosceles gaucho Heineken & Lowe, 1832

= Loxosceles gaucho =

Species of spider

Loxosceles gaucho commonly known in English as the gaucho spider is a highly venomous recluse spider endemic to South America.

== Description and behavior ==
Adult females grow up to 7–12 mm, the maximum reported is 14 mm. They are mainly characterized by their brown color, leading to them be colloquially referred to as ''Aranha marrom'' (Portuguese for brown spider) in Brazil, the body is characterized by a pale to dark brown color (often reddish), with a dorsal violin-shaped mark, slightly darker on the carapace, with long and slender legs, without dark marks or stripes. Males have the thoracic region with the clearest impression, consisting of bands, with the anterior portion of the cephalothorax forming in the rear direction a '' V '' design, while pedipalps have the last short articles and curved stylus. Females have the anterior portion of the cephalothorax forming a '' U '' shape backwards. Like many recluse spiders, It is nocturnal, hunting preys such as insects and arthropods with their strong webs, and is more active in the hottest seasons of the year.

== Range and habitat ==
They usually spin irregular webs in cracks, crevices and corners (which is why some people call them the corner spider), along or under large rocks. It often can be found in human's houses, in dark places, like clothes, shoes, socks and other parts of the house, this species mainly occurs in Central and Southern Brazil, but have been introduced to Tunisia.

== Medical significance ==
One study of 81 cases of cutaneous and cutaneous-hemolytic loxoscelism, from a geographical area where most accidents are caused by L. gaucho, reported bite-related symptoms such as massive hemolysis and acute kidney injury (in two cases). In 25 cases, an increase in serum bilirubin and LDH was observed, suggestive of hemolysis. Anemia (14.7%), reticulocytosis (56%), thrombocytopenia (17.6%), an increase in D-dimer and fever were also reported. A study with the venom of L. gaucho showed the main local bite reactions, such as pain, edema, erythema, ecchymosis, pallor and dermonecrosis, and systemic like Hemolysis. In the state of São Paulo alone, Brazil, it is responsible for causing viscerocutaneous loxoscelism in 3.1% of cases.
