= Léon Jean Marie Dufour =

French medical doctor and naturalist

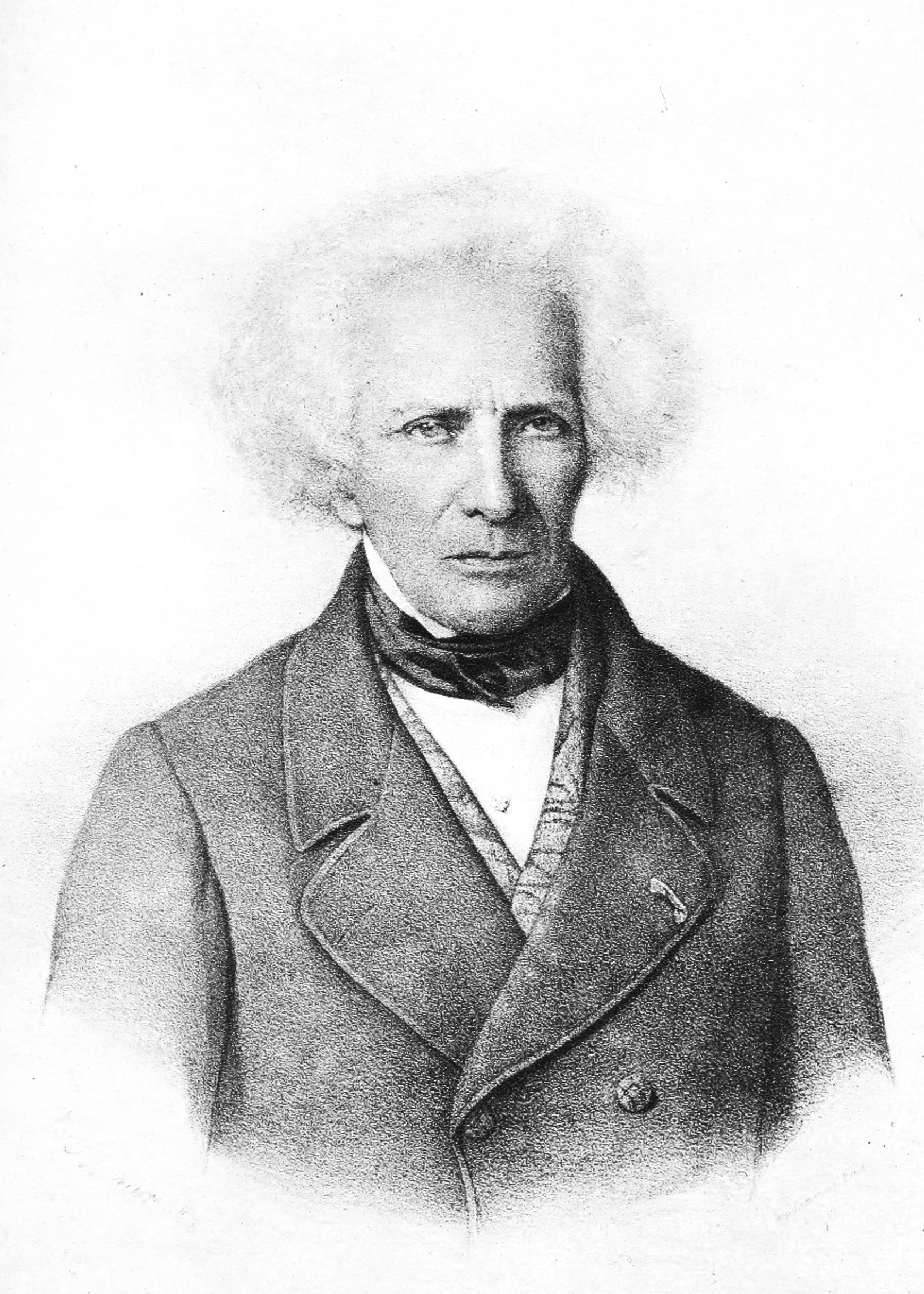
- Léon Jean Marie Dufour after a lithograph by Maurin
- Born: 10 April 1780; Saint-Sever
- Died: 18 April 1865 (aged 85); Saint-Sever
- Scientific career
- Fields: Natural history

Léon Jean Marie (or Jean-Marie Léon) Dufour (10 April 1780, Saint-Sever – 18 April 1865) was a French medical doctor and naturalist.

Between 1799 and 1806 he studied medicine in Paris then returned to Saint-Sever in the Landes. He participated as an army doctor in the Peninsular War and returned to his birthplace at the end of the war. In 1854, he was elected a foreign member of the Royal Swedish Academy of Sciences.

Dufour’s gland, an abdominal gland found in the females of nearly all members of the suborder Apocrita, is named after him.

During his life he published 232 articles on arthropods (twenty on spiders) and was the author of Recherches anatomiques sur les Carabiques et sur plusieurs autres Coléoptères (1824–1826, Paris).

He was honoured in 1810, in the naming of Dufourea, which is a genus of lichen-forming fungi in the subfamily Xanthorioideae of the family Teloschistaceae.

== Additional writings ==
- Recherches anatomiques et physiologiques sur les hémiptères : accompagnées de considérations relatives a l'histoire naturelle et a la classification des ces insectes 1833 – Anatomical and physiological research of Hemiptera, along with considerations regarding the natural history and classification of insects.
- Notice botanique et culinaire sur les champignons comestibles du département des Landes, 1840 – Botanical and culinary notes on edible mushrooms from the département of Landes.
- Explications, notes, errata et addenda concernant les Recherches anatomiques et phisiologiques sur les orthoptères, les hyménoptères et les névroptères : part of the seventh volume of the Mémoires de l'Académie des sciences, 1841 – Explanations, notes, errata and addenda for anatomical and physiological research of Orthoptera, Hymenoptera and Neuroptera.
- Histoire Anatomique Et Physiologique Des Scorpions, 1856 – Anatomical and physiological history of scorpions.
- Anatomie, physiologie et histoire naturelle des galéodes, 1861 – Anatomy, physiology and natural history of Galeodes.

Dufour edited and distributed an exsiccata-like specimen series named Lichens Pyrénéens.

== Other sources ==
- Jean-Jacques Amigo, « Dufour (Jean-Marie, dit Léon) », in Nouveau Dictionnaire de biographies roussillonnaises, vol. 3 Sciences de la Vie et de la Terre, Perpignan, Publications de l'olivier, 2017, 915 p. (ISBN 9782908866506)
- Chantal Boone (2003). Léon Dufour (1780–1865). Savant naturaliste et médecin. Atlantica (Anglet) : 336 p.
