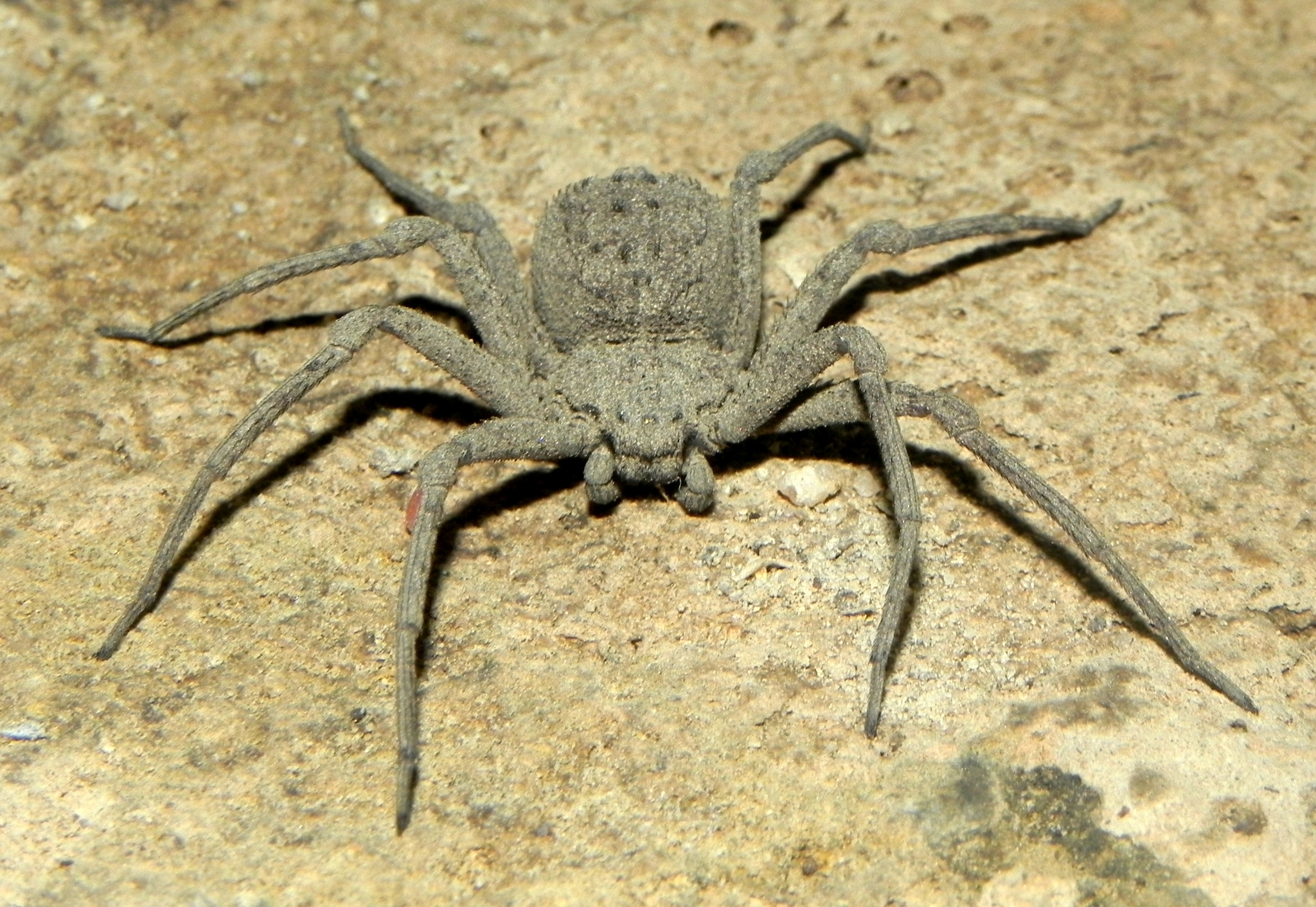

Scientific classification
- Kingdom: Animalia
- Phylum: Arthropoda
- Subphylum: Chelicerata
- Class: Arachnida
- Order: Araneae
- Infraorder: Araneomorphae
- Family: Sicariidae
- Genus: Sicarius
- Species: S. ornatus

Binomial name
- Sicarius ornatus Magalhaes, Brescovit & Santos, 2013

= Sicarius ornatus =

Species of venomous spider

Sicarius ornatus is a species of venomous spider found in Brazil. It has a highly toxic venom like the other South American sicariid, Loxosceles laeta and the African Hexophthalma hahni, but few human bites have been recorded. Its venom has active sphingomyelinase D, and can lead to a severe pathology.

== Venom ==
The venom of Sicarius ornatus contains active sphingomyelinase D, the main toxin responsible for local and systemic effects, the venom of S. ornatus is endowed with all toxic properties in vitro and ex vivo, and like Loxosceles, it is capable and hydrolyzes sphingomyelin, induce cell death of keratinocytes and complement-dependent hemolysis, harmful events that have been associated with the presence of active sphingomyelinase D and pathologies in vivo, these studies indicate that the venom of S. ornatus can potentially lead to a pathology similar to that of Loxosceles. Five micrograms of venom can induce more than 60% of hemolysis, while Sicarius tropicus causes a maximum 50% of hemolysis even at higher concentrations.
