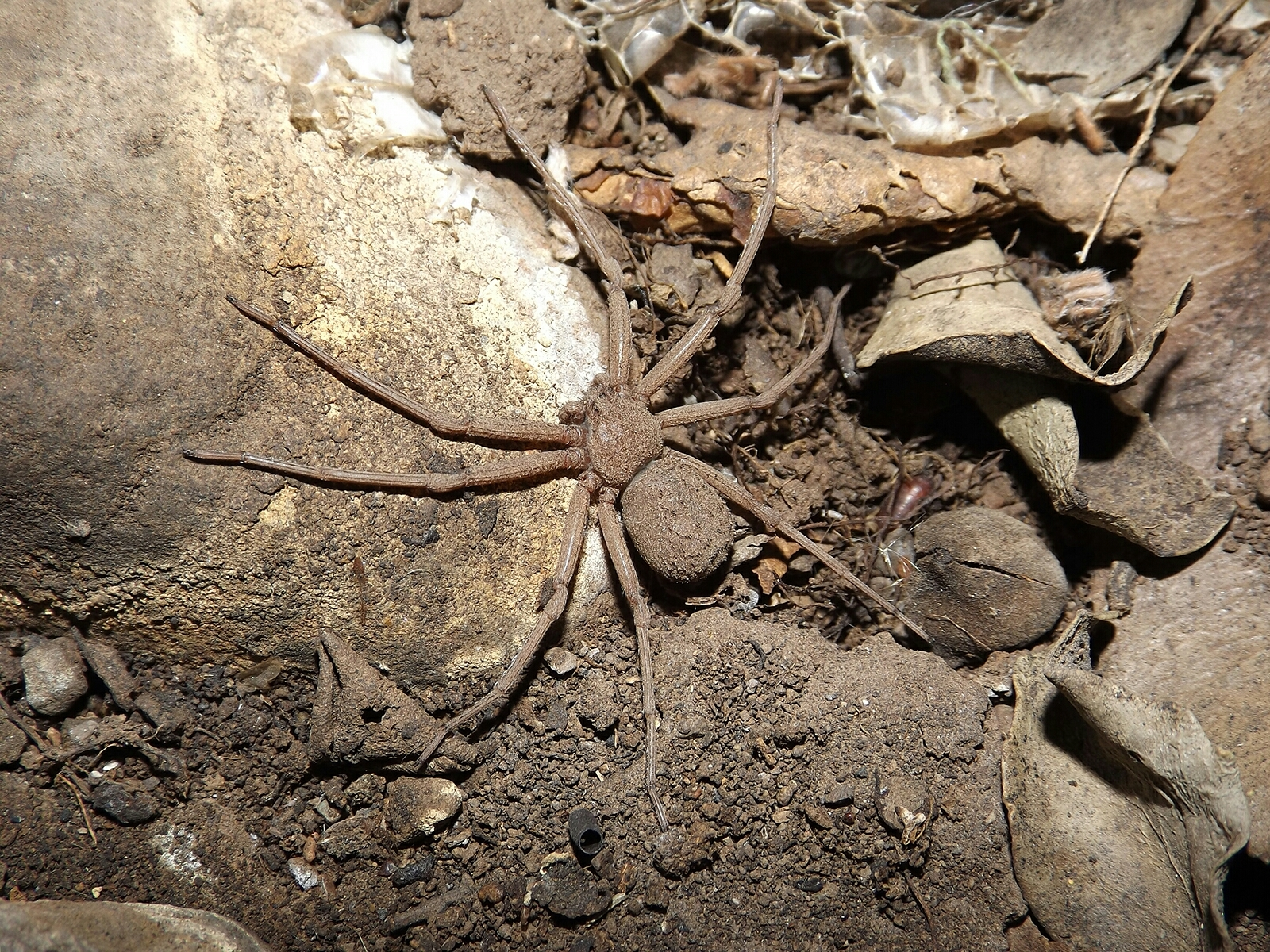

Scientific classification
- Kingdom: Animalia
- Phylum: Arthropoda
- Subphylum: Chelicerata
- Class: Arachnida
- Order: Araneae
- Infraorder: Araneomorphae
- Family: Sicariidae
- Genus: Sicarius
- Species: S. thomisoides

Binomial name
- Sicarius thomisoides (Walckenaer, 1847)

Synonyms
- Thomisoides minorata Nicolet, 1849; Thomisoides rubripes Nicolet, 1849; Thomisoides terrosa Nicolet, 1849; Thomisoides nicoletii Keyserling, 1880; Sicarius minoratus (Nicolet, 1849); Sicarius rubripes (Nicolet, 1849); Sicarius terrosus (Nicolet, 1849); Sicarius nicoleti (Keyserling, 1880)

= Sicarius thomisoides =

Species of spider

Sicarius thomisoides is a species of spider in the family Sicariidae, found in Chile. It is the type species of the genus Sicarius. Its correct name has been the source of confusion. It has often been known by the synonym Sicarius terrosus, a name which has also often been used incorrectly for other species.

== Taxonomy ==
There has been confusion over the correct name for this species. In 1847, Charles Athanase Walckenaer published the name Sicarius thomisoides, also erecting the genus Sicarius. He based the name on illustrations he had seen in a work still in preparation and so not then published, namely a section on spiders by Hercule Nicolet in the multivolume Historia física y política de Chile. It was finally published in 1849. Nicolet called the species Thomisoides terrosus. In his earlier publication, Walckenaer had argued that Thomisoides was inappropriate as a genus name, as the species was not related to Thomisus, a crab spider. Although Walckenaer's name has priority, Thomisoides terrosus was used in subsequent descriptions, and even when the generic name Thomisoides was abandoned in favour of Sicarius, the specific name terrosus continued to be employed (e.g. in the World Spider Catalog in 2015). F.O. Pickard-Cambridge had argued in 1899 that if Walckenaer's Sicarius is used as the generic name, his specific name should be too. This argument was reinforced in 2017, and is now accepted, so that Sicarius thomisoides is the correct name for the species, which is the type species of the genus.

Adding to the confusion, the specific name terrosus "was very seldom used in the literature to refer to the correct Chilean species", so that descriptions under this name may actually refer to species such as Sicarius levii.

== Description and behavior ==
It can grow between 12 and 20 mm in length, lives in desert areas of northern and central Chile and has nocturnal habits, building shelters under rocks on sandy substrate in northern Chile, it is extremely common in urban regions with a lot of household waste.

Sicarius spiders have already been observed feeding on insects, scorpions and other spiders, but in 2020, a 20 mm long specimen of S. thomisoides was recorded in Mamiña, in northern Chile, preying on a gecko (Phyllodactylus gerrhopygus) 28 mm long. The spider was reported feeding on the fluids of the lizard's digested body, the lizard's skin was damaged and dark, indicating possible dermonecrotic effects, since enzymes of hemolytic and dermonecrotic activity were reported in Sicarius, with an action similar to that of Loxosceles.

== Venom ==
A recent study showed that the species S. thomisoides has active sphingomyelinase D, which has effects and intensity similar to that of the dangerous Chilean recluse spider (Loxosceles laeta).

The venom is capable of causing complement-dependent hemolysis and cytotoxic activity against human skin fibroblasts in concentrations of 10 μg, and 50 μg induces progressive dermonecrosis, basically induces hemolysis, cytotoxicity and dermonecrosis. Therefore, like Sicarius ornatus and Loxosceles laeta, S. thomisoides fulfils the toxic parameters to cause damage in humans. The concentration of 50 μg of S. thomisoides venom seems to be enough to produce dermonecrosis. Thus, higher doses of venom inoculated by adults of S. thomisoides could cause more serious lesions, since adults possess up to eight times the concentration assayed. Sicarius thomisoides venom also has extremely fibrinogenolytic activity and cleaved all Aα-Chains most rapidly, while Loxosceles reclusa and L. laeta took longer to cleave.
