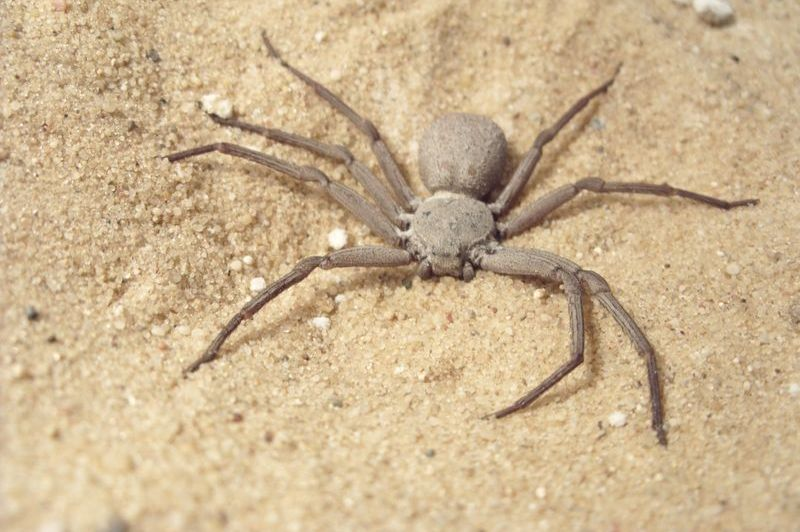
- Female Sicarius sp.
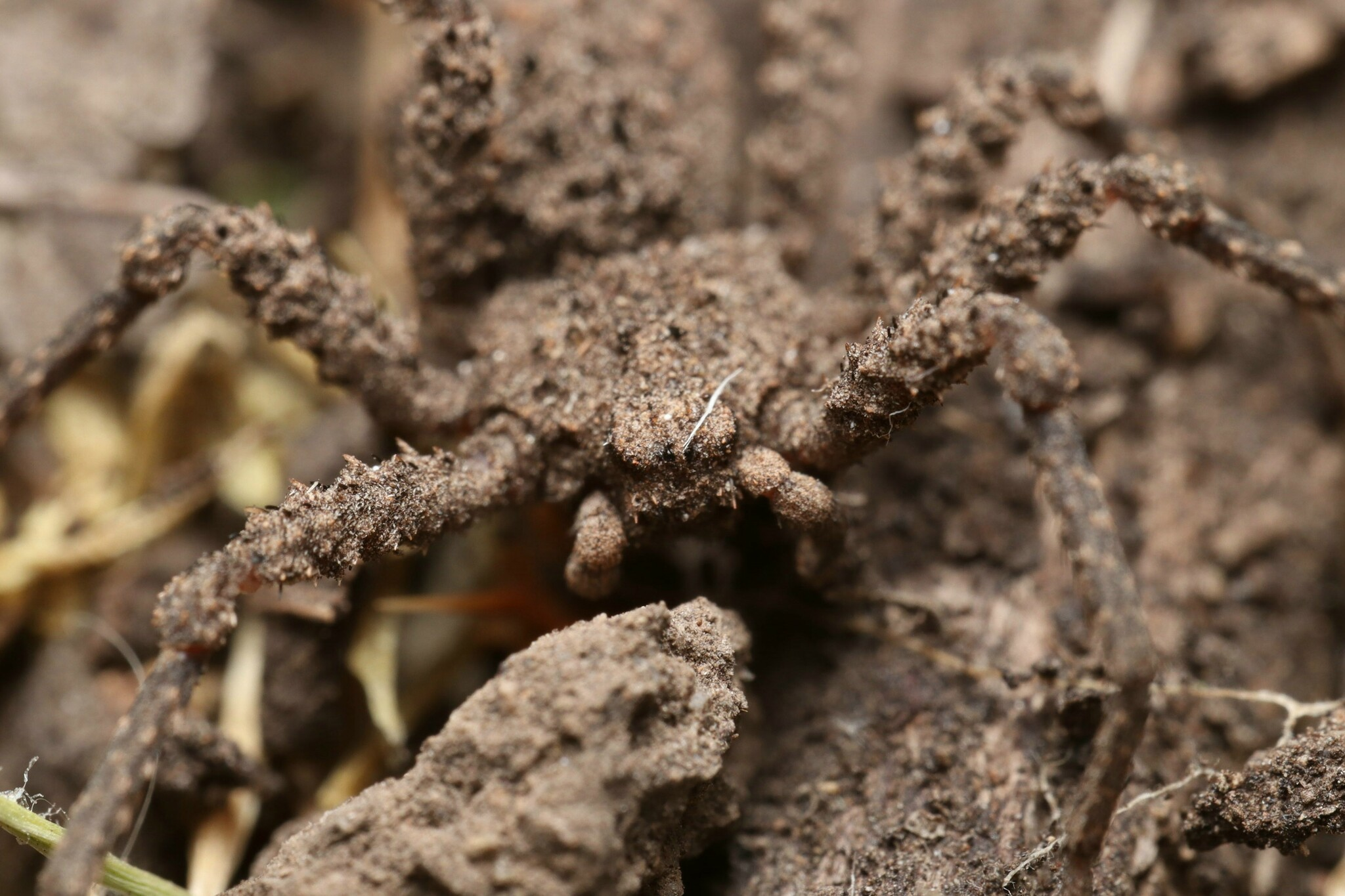
- S. fumosus

Scientific classification
- Kingdom: Animalia
- Phylum: Arthropoda
- Subphylum: Chelicerata
- Class: Arachnida
- Order: Araneae
- Infraorder: Araneomorphae
- Family: Sicariidae
- Genus: Sicarius; Walckenaer, 1847

Species
- 21, see text

= Sicarius (spider) =

Six-eyed sand spiders

Genus of recluse spiders

Sicarius is a genus of recluse spiders that are potentially medically significant to humans. It is one of three genera in its family, all venomous spiders known for a bite that can induce loxoscelism. They live in deserts and arid regions of the Neotropics, and females use a mixture of sand and silk when producing egg sacs. The genus name is Latin for assassin.

== Distribution ==
Most species in this genus are found in South America, with one species, Sicarius rugosus occurring in Central America, north to Guatemala.

== Description ==
Sicarius spiders can grow up to 1 to 2 inches (25 to 51 mm) long, and have six eyes arranged into three groups of two (known as "dyads"). Physically, they resemble crab spiders and members of the Homalonychus genus. They lack the characteristic violin-shaped marking of the more well-known members of its family Sicariidae, the recluse spiders.

They can live for a very long time without food or water. Some can live for up to fifteen years, making them among the longest-lived spiders, behind the trap-door spiders and tarantulas, many known to live for twenty to thirty years. The oldest recorded spider is Number 16, a trap-door spider killed by a parasitic wasp at forty-three years old.

=== Venom components and effects ===
Like all recluse spiders, these produce a dermonecrotic venom that contains sphingomyelinase D, an enzyme in the sphingomyelin phosphodiesterase family. It is somewhat unique to them, otherwise only found in a few pathogenic bacteria. The venom causes bleeding and damage to many organs of the body, though only S. ornatus and a few others have been proven to be extremely toxic on the order of Hexophtalma hahni or several other African sand spiders. It has also recently been proven that Sicarius thomisoides contains active sphingomyelinase D, very similar to that of Loxosceles laeta and Sicarius ornatus, and that its bite can cause serious damage in humans.

== Taxonomy ==
This genus was erected by Charles Athanase Walckenaer in 1847 with the single species, S. thomisoides. In 2017, the number of species placed in the genus decreased after a phylogenetic study showed that the South African species formerly included here were actually distinct, instead belonging to the genus Hexophthalma.

It is one of only three genera in its family, and is placed in the same subfamily as Hexophthalma:

- Sicariidae
  - Loxoscelinae
    Loxosceles (recluse spiders)
  - Sicariinae
    - Hexophthalma
    - Sicarius

=== Species ===
As of October 2025, this genus includes 21 species:

- Sicarius andinus Magalhaes, Brescovit & Santos, 2017 – Peru
- Sicarius boliviensis Magalhaes, Brescovit & Santos, 2017 – Bolivia, Peru, Brazil, Paraguay
- Sicarius cariri Magalhaes, Brescovit & Santos, 2013 – Brazil
- Sicarius crustosus (Nicolet, 1849) – Chile
- Sicarius diadorim Magalhaes, Brescovit & Santos, 2013 – Brazil
- Sicarius fumosus (Nicolet, 1849) – Chile
- Sicarius gracilis (Keyserling, 1880) – Ecuador, Peru
- Sicarius jequitinhonha Magalhaes, Brescovit & Santos, 2017 – Brazil
- Sicarius lanuginosus (Nicolet, 1849) – Chile
- Sicarius levii Magalhaes, Brescovit & Santos, 2017 – Chile, Argentina
- Sicarius mapuche Magalhaes, Brescovit & Santos, 2017 – Argentina
- Sicarius ornatus Magalhaes, Brescovit & Santos, 2013 – Brazil
- Sicarius peruensis (Keyserling, 1880) – Peru
- Sicarius rugosus (F. O. Pickard-Cambridge, 1899) – Guatemala, El Salvador, Honduras, Nicaragua, Costa Rica
- Sicarius rupestris (Holmberg, 1881) – Argentina
- Sicarius saci Magalhaes, Brescovit & Santos, 2017 – Brazil
- Sicarius thomisoides Walckenaer, 1847 – Chile (type species)
- Sicarius tropicus (Mello-Leitão, 1936) – Brazil
- Sicarius utriformis (Butler, 1877) – Galapagos
- Sicarius vallenato Cala-Riquelme, Gutiérrez-Estrada, Flórez-Daza & Agnarsson, 2017 – Colombia
- Sicarius yurensis Strand, 1908 – Peru, Chile

In synonymy:

- S. deformis (Nicolet, 1849) = Sicarius fumosus (Nicolet, 1849)
- S. irregularis (Mello-Leitão, 1940) = Sicarius rupestris (Holmberg, 1881)
- S. minoratus (Nicolet, 1849) = Sicarius thomisoides Walckenaer, 1847
- S. nicoleti (Keyserling, 1880) = Sicarius thomisoides Walckenaer, 1847
- S. patagonicus Simon, 1919 = Sicarius rupestris (Holmberg, 1881)
- S. rubripes (Nicolet, 1849) = Sicarius thomisoides Walckenaer, 1847
- S. terrosus (Nicolet, 1849) = Sicarius thomisoides Walckenaer, 1847

Transferred to Hexophthalma

- Sicarius albospinosus = Hexophthalma albospinosa (Purcell, 1908)
- Sicarius damarensis = Hexophthalma damarensis (Lawrence, 1928)
- Sicarius dolichocephalus = Hexophthalma dolichocephala (Lawrence, 1928)
- Sicarius hahni = Hexophthalma hahni (Karsch, 1878) (also = Sicarius testaceus)
- Sicarius spatulatus = Hexophthalma spatulata (Pocock, 1900)
