= Robert Raven =

Australian arachnologist

- Education: University of Queensland
- Scientific career
- Fields: Arachnology
- Workplaces: Queensland Museum

Robert John Raven is an Australian arachnologist, being the Head of Terrestrial Biodiversity and the Senior Curator (Arachnida) at the Queensland Museum. Dr Raven has described over 450 species of spider in Australia and elsewhere, and is spider bite consultant to the Royal Brisbane Hospital, leading to much work on spider toxins.
