= Sicarius tropicus =

Scientific classification
- Domain: Eukaryota
- Kingdom: Animalia
- Phylum: Arthropoda
- Subphylum: Chelicerata
- Class: Arachnida
- Order: Araneae
- Infraorder: Araneomorphae
- Family: Sicariidae
- Genus: Sicarius
- Species: S. tropicus

Binomial name
- Sicarius tropicus (Mello-Leitao, 1936)

Species of spider

Sicarius tropicus is a species of six-eyed sand spider (Sicarius) endemic in South American caatinga in Brazil. Like related spiders, it is venomous, but only one medically-significant bite has been recorded, causing dermonecrotic lesions in a 17-year-old boy.

== Venom ==
A 2021 study compared the venom with that of Loxosceles laeta, considered the most toxic species in the genus. The venom of S. tropicus contains Sphingomyelinase D, capable of causing dependent hemolysis; the hemolysis mechanisms were found to differ between the two species.
