= Loxoscelism =

Necrotising sore caused by some spider bites

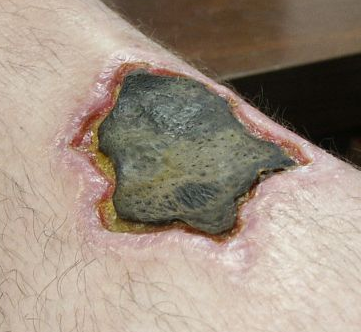
- Specialty: Emergency medicine

Loxoscelism (/lɒkˈsɒsɪlɪzəm/) is a condition occasionally produced by the bite of the recluse spiders (genus Loxosceles). The area becomes dusky and a shallow open sore forms as the skin around the bite dies (necrosis). As of 2006, it was the only proven type of necrotic arachnidism in humans. (Note: The recluse spiders are the only genus definitively shown to cause necrotic bites in humans. The layers of skin die and slough away leaving an ulcer. Since at least 1872, the blanket term necrotic arachnidism has been used in the medical literature, often erroneously implicating spiders that do not cause dermal necrosis. Spider species blamed for necrosis in the past have included wolf spiders, white-tailed spiders, black house spiders, yellow sac spiders, orb weavers, and funnel-weaving spiders such as the hobo spider.) While there is no known therapy effective for loxoscelism, there has been research on antibiotics, surgical timing, hyperbaric oxygen, potential antivenoms and vaccines. Because of the number of diseases that may mimic loxoscelism, it is frequently misdiagnosed by physicians. (Note: Diseases that may cause symptoms similar to loxoscelism include: streptococcal or staphylococcal infection (particularly by methicillin-resistant Staphylococcus aureus), herpes simplex, herpes zoster, diabetic ulcer, fungal infection, pyoderma gangrenosum, lymphomatoid papulosis, chemical burn, Toxicodendron dermatitis, squamous cell carcinoma, neoplasia, localized vasculitis, syphilis, Stevens-Johnson syndrome, toxic epidermal necrolysis, erythema nodosum, erythema multiforme, gonococcemia, purpura fulminans, sporotrichosis, Lyme disease, cowpox, and anthrax.)

Loxoscelism was first described in the United States in 1879 in Tennessee. Although there are up to 13 different Loxosceles species in North America (11 native and two non-native), Loxosceles reclusa, also known as the Brown Recluse, Fiddleback, or Violin spider, is the species most often involved in serious envenomation. L. reclusa has a limited habitat that includes the Southeast United States. In South America, L. laeta, L. intermedia (found in Brazil and Argentina), and L. gaucho (Brazil) are the three species most often reported to cause necrotic bites.

== Pathophysiology ==
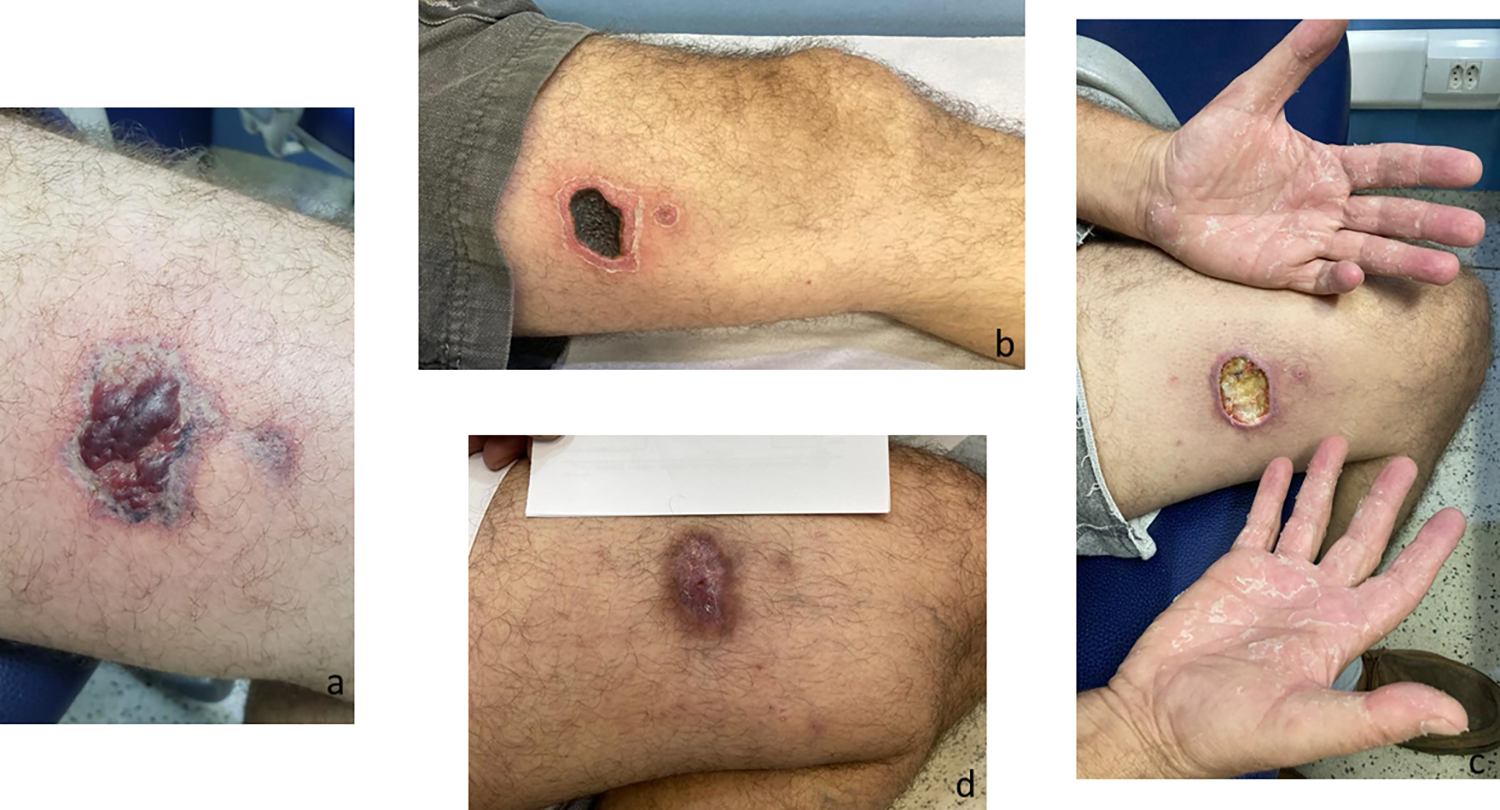
Necrotic cutaneous loxoscelism Necrosis after 5 (a), 20 (b) and 27 (c) days. Residual scar after 83 days (d)

Loxoscelism may present with local and whole-body symptoms:

- Necrotic cutaneous loxoscelism is the medical term for the skin only reaction of loxoscelism. It is characterized by a localized necrotic wound at the site of bite. The majority of Loxosceles bites result in minor skin irritation that heals in one week. Other lesions often need 6 to 8 weeks to heal, and can leave lasting scars.
- Viscerocutaneous loxoscelism refers to the combination of skin and other organ manifestations. This occurs infrequently after Loxosceles bites. Symptoms include low energy, nausea and vomiting, and fever. Destruction of blood cells (hemolytic anemia) may require transfusion and injure the kidney. Consumption of clotting factors (so-called disseminated intravascular coagulation ["DIC"]) and destruction of platelets (thrombocytopenia) is reported most often in children. DIC may lead to dangerous bleeding. Occasionally, acute kidney failure may develop from myonecrosis and rhabdomyolysis, leading to coma.

=== Loxosceles toxins ===
Loxosceles venom has several toxins; the most important for necrotic arachnidism is the enzyme sphingomyelinase D. It is present in all recluse species to varying degrees and not all are equivalent. This toxin is present in only one other known spider genus (Sicarius). The toxin dissolves the structural components of the cell membrane generating cyclic phosphates that perhaps act as a trigger for cellular self-destruction. The area of destruction is limited to the presence of the enzyme, which cannot reproduce.

== Diagnosis ==
The spider biting apparatus is short and bites are only possible in experimental animals with pressure on the spider's back. Thus many bites occur when a spider is trapped in a shirt or pant sleeve. There is no commercial chemical test to determine if the venom is from a brown recluse. The bite itself is not usually painful. Many necrotic lesions are erroneously attributed to the bite of the brown recluse. Skin wounds are common and infections will lead to necrotic wounds, thus many severe skin infections are attributed falsely to the brown recluse. Many suspected bites occurred in areas outside of its natural habitat. A wound found one week later may be misattributed to the spider. The diagnosis is further complicated by the fact that no attempt is made to positively identify the suspected spider. Because of this, other, non-necrotic species are often misidentified as a brown recluse. Several certified arachnologists are able to positively identify a brown recluse specimen on request.

Reports of presumptive brown recluse spider bites reinforce improbable diagnoses in regions of North America where the spider is not endemic such as Florida, Pennsylvania, and California.

The mnemonic "NOT RECLUSE" has been suggested as a tool to help professionals more objectively exclude skin lesions that were suspected to be loxosceles. Numerous (should be solitary), Occurrence (wrong geography), Timing (wrong season), Red Center (center should be black), Elevated (should be shallow depression), Chronic, Large (more than 10 cm), Ulcerates too quickly (less than a week), Swollen, Exudative (there should be no pus, it should be dry)

Systemic loxoscelism, a rare but severe illness caused by a brown recluse bite, can be diagnosed through urinalysis. However, a blood test for elevated lactate dehydrogenase and total bilirubin have been shown to be a more sensitive test.

== Treatment ==
Despite being one of the few medically important spider bites, there is no established treatment for the bite of a Loxosceles spider. Physicians wait for the body to heal itself, and assist with cosmetic appearance. There are, however, some remedies currently being researched.

=== Anti-venoms ===
Anti-venoms are commercially prepared antibodies to toxins in animal bites. They are specific for each bite. There are several anti-venoms commercially available in Brazil, which have been shown to be effective in controlling the spread of necrosis in rabbits. When administered immediately, they can almost entirely neutralize any ill effects. If too much time is allowed to pass, the treatment becomes ineffective. Most victims do not seek medical attention within the first twelve hours of being bitten, and these anti-venoms are largely ineffective after this point. Because of this, anti-venoms are not being developed more widely. They have, however, been proven to be very effective if administered in a timely manner and could be utilized in Brazil as a legitimate technique.

=== Surgical treatment ===
In cases where a large dermonecrotic lesion has developed, the dead tissue can be surgically removed. Skin grafting may ultimately be needed to cover this defect.

== Species implicated ==
=== Loxosceles ===
It is suspected that most if not all species of the genus Loxosceles have necrotic venom. Over fifty species have been identified in the genus, but significant research has only been conducted on species living in close proximity to humans.

==== Loxosceles reclusa (Brown recluse spider) ====
Among the spiders bearing necrotic venom, the brown recluse is the most commonly encountered by humans. The range of the brown recluse spider extends from southeastern Nebraska to southernmost Ohio and south into Georgia and most of Texas. It can be distinguished by violin shaped markings on its back. The long spindly ("haywire") legs have no spines or banding pattern. The brown recluse has six eyes, arranged in pairs, an uncommon arrangement but not exclusive. However, many lesser known species of the Loxosceles genus are believed to have similar venoms. L. reclusa is a very non-aggressive species. There have been documented cases of homes having very large populations of brown recluse spiders for many years without any of the human inhabitants being bitten. For this reason, L. reclusa bites are relatively rare, but, because its range overlaps human habitation, its bite is the cause of loxoscelism in North America.

==== Loxosceles laeta (Chilean recluse spider) ====
Loxosceles laeta, commonly known as the Chilean recluse spider, is widely distributed in South and Central America. Necrotic skin lesions and systemic loxoscelism are well described with this species. It can be transported by people, and populations in solitary buildings are noted in North America, Finland, and Australia. L. laeta has been documented at elevations between 200m and 2340m. The laeta is cryptozoic, meaning it lives in dark concealed places. This can often mean piles of wood or brick.

==== Loxosceles deserta (Desert recluse) ====
L. deserta is found in the Southwest United States. Human interactions with it are rare, because it usually is only found in native vegetation. It is not usually found within heavily populated areas, but its range does come near these areas. It is considered medically unimportant due to the low likelihood of human-to-spider encounters.

=== Other genera ===
==== Lampona cylindrata (White-tailed spider) ====
The white-tailed spider, found principally in Australia, was formerly blamed for a series of illnesses including necrotic arachnidism. This used to be part of academic and popular belief, but several reviews of the data have demonstrated no necrosis.

==== Cheiracanthium inclusum (Yellow sac spider) ====
Cheiracanthium inclusum, also known as the black-footed yellow sac spider, has been implicated in necrotic skin lesions. C. inclusum's venom has been claimed to be weakly necrotic, but arachnologists contest this assertion. This spider can be found all over North, Central, and South America, as well as in The West Indies. It is often encountered by people indoors and outdoors alike.

==== Eratigena agrestis (Hobo spider) ====
Many necrotic lesions in the northwestern United States have been attributed to spider bite. The Centers for Disease Control made a survey as brown recluses are not found in the Pacific Northwest. However, there is a large population of the E. agrestis. This fact has led many to believe that the bite of the hobo spider is also necrotic. Critics note that this evidence is only circumstantial. The species is of European origin and never known to have caused such effects over the hundreds of years that it has been known by, interacted with, and bitten people. Claims of a medically significant bite should be regarded as a myth.

==== Lycosa spp (Wolf spiders) ====
In their 1925 study, Brazilian antivenom research pioneers Vital Brazil and Jehan Albert Vellard first focused on Lycosa species as causes for illness and widespread necrotic lesions. This belief lasted for 50 years until the wolf spider was exonerated.

== See also ==
- Latrodectism
- Tarantism
- List of cutaneous conditions
- List of spiders associated with cutaneous reactions
