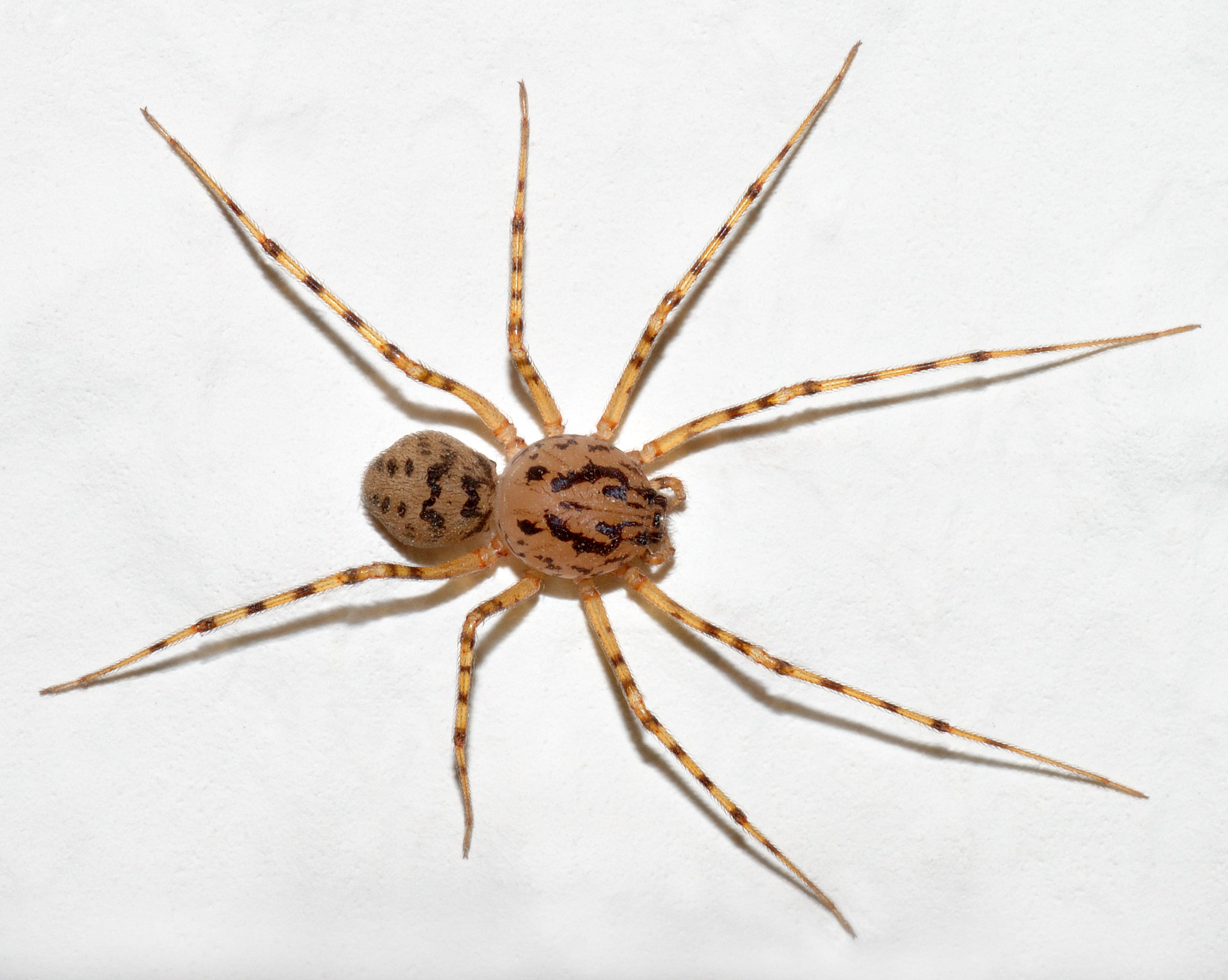
- Scytodes thoracica, Scytodidae

Scientific classification
- Kingdom: Animalia
- Phylum: Arthropoda
- Subphylum: Chelicerata
- Class: Arachnida
- Order: Araneae
- Infraorder: Araneomorphae
- Superfamily: Scytodoidea; Blackwall, 1864

Families
- See text.

= Scytodoidea =

Scytodoidea Temporal range: Cretaceous–present

Superfamily of spiders

Scytodoidea is a taxon of araneomorph spiders, at the rank of superfamily. It contains four families:

- Drymusidae
- Periegopidae
- Scytodidae
- Sicariidae

== Phylogeny ==
The monophyly of the group has been confirmed in morphological studies. One hypothesis for the relationships of the four families is shown in the following cladogram:

- Scytodoidea
  - Sicariidae
  - - Scytodidae
    - - Periegopidae
      - Drymusidae

Earlier studies agree in placing the Sicariidae as the most basal family, but reverse the positions of Drymusidae and Scytodidae. Scytodoidea is placed within the haplogyne clade of araneomorph spiders, as one of the more derived clades.
