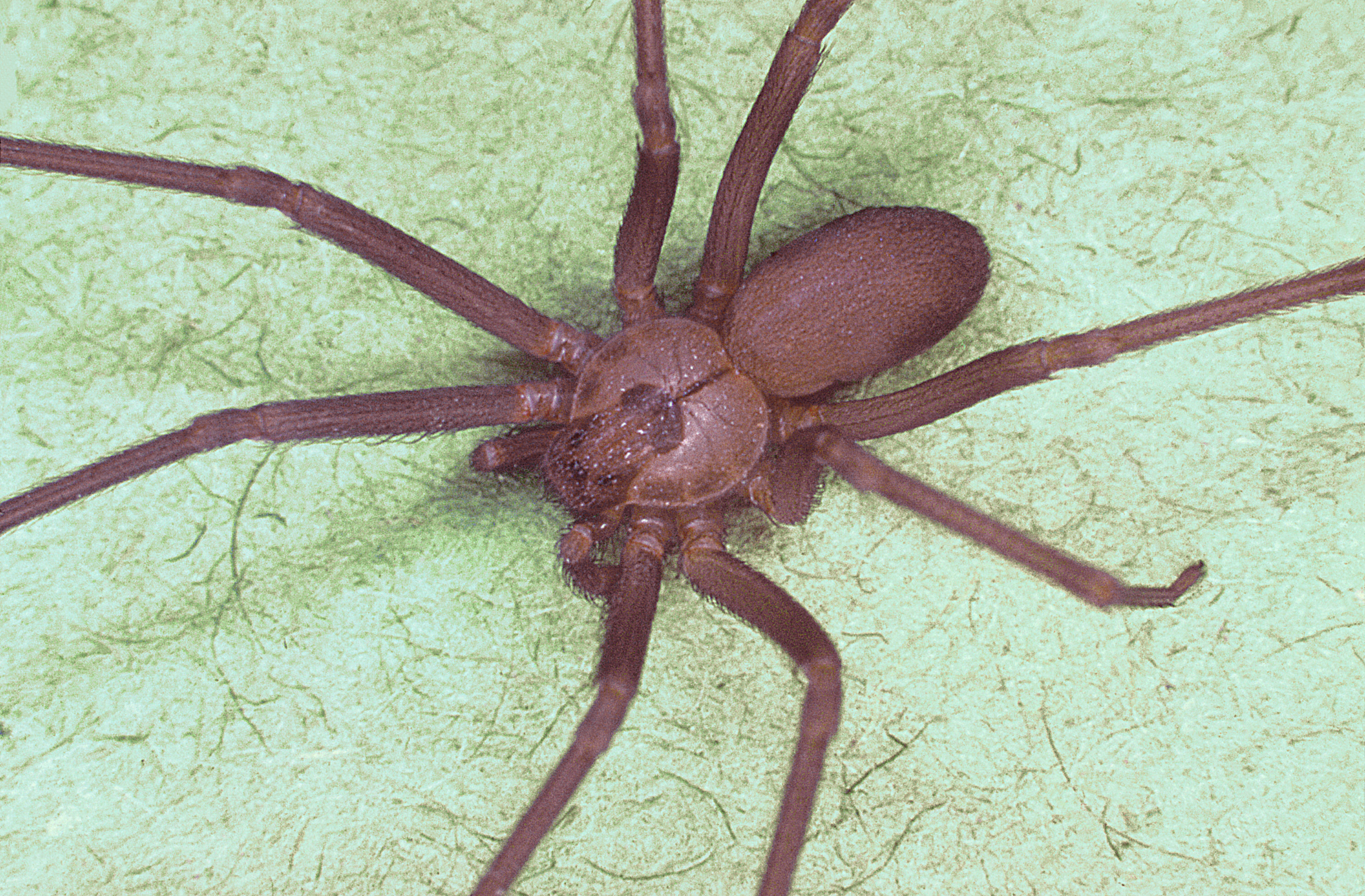
- Brown recluse spider (Loxosceles reclusa)
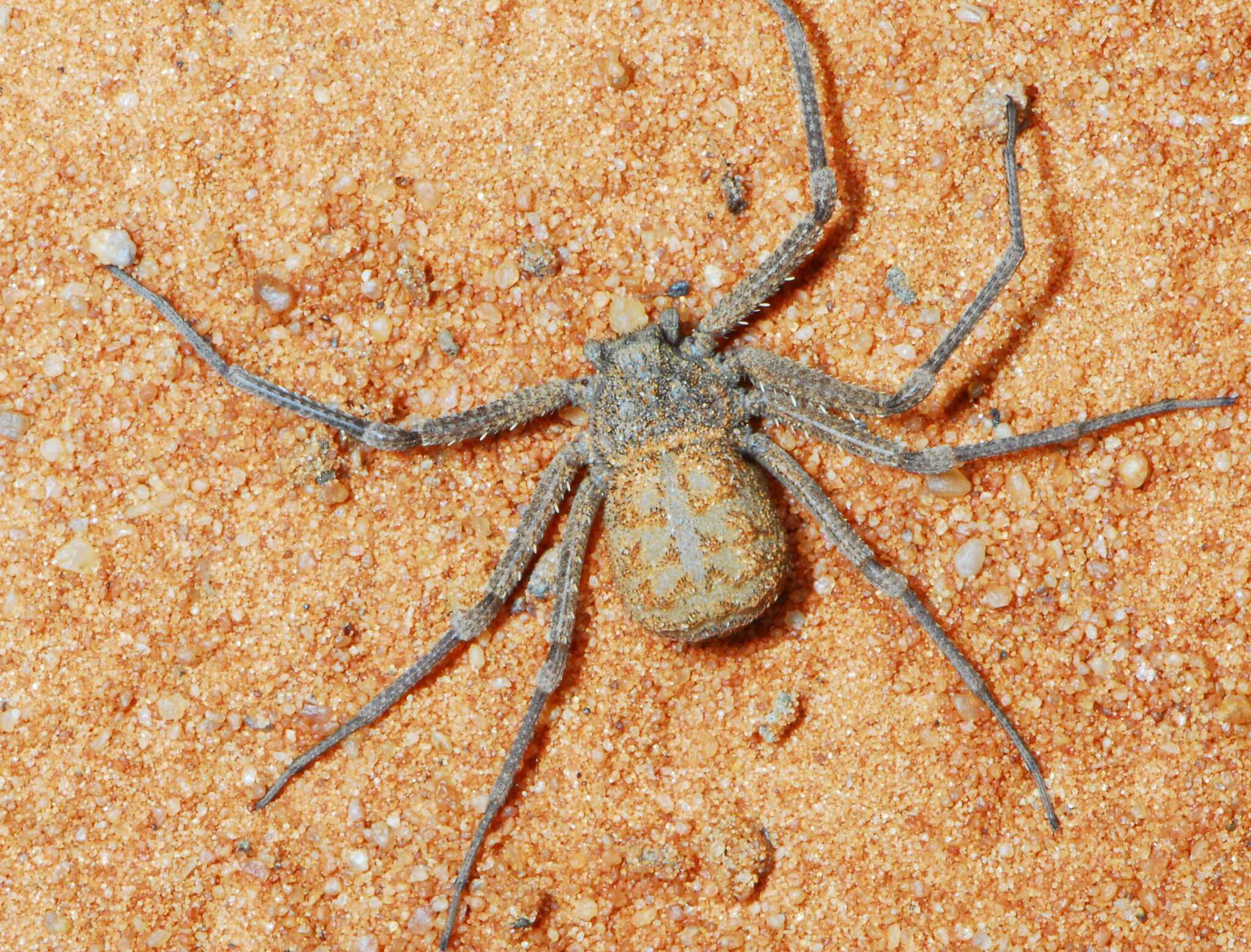
- Hexophthalma hahni from South Africa

Scientific classification
- Kingdom: Animalia
- Phylum: Arthropoda
- Subphylum: Chelicerata
- Class: Arachnida
- Order: Araneae
- Infraorder: Araneomorphae
- Superfamily: Scytodoidea
- Family: Sicariidae; Keyserling, 1880

Genera
- Hexophthalma Karsch, 1879; Loxosceles Heineken & Lowe, 1832; Sicarius Walckenaer, 1847

Diversity
- 3 genera, 177 species
- blue: reported countries (WSC) green: observation hotspots (iNaturalist)

Synonyms
- Loxoscelidae

= Sicariidae =

Sicariidae Temporal range: Neogene–present

Family of spiders

Sicariidae is a family of six-eyed venomous spiders known for their potentially necrotic bites. The family consists of three genera and about 180 species. Well known spiders in this family include the brown recluse spider and the six-eyed sand spider.

== Description ==
Loxosceles, commonly known as "recluse spiders" or "violin spiders", are distributed nearly worldwide in warmer areas. Hexophthalma (sand spiders) and Sicarius (assassin or sand spiders) live in the deserts of southern Africa and South to Central America, respectively. They are known for their self-burying behavior and the ability to go long periods without food or water.

All members have six eyes arranged in three groups of two (dyads). Violin spiders are usually brownish with a darker brown characteristic violin marking on the cephalothorax. They are also haplogyne, meaning the females possess unsclerotised genitals.

Hexophthalma and Sicarius resemble crab spiders and lack this marking. Along with the tarantulas, these are some of the longest living spiders, some living up to fifteen years old. Most Loxosceles can live for one and a half to two years.

== Venom ==
All genera are able to produce sphingomyelinase D or a related tissue-destroying substance. It is unique to the family among spiders, and otherwise only found in a few pathogenic bacteria. Bites from most of the Neotropical species of Sicarius are not known to display dermonecrotic or systemic activity, except the highly venomous Sicarius ornatus which has active proteins of the sphingomyelinase D family found in the venom. It has also recently been proven that Sicarius thomisoides contains active sphingomyelinase D, very similar to that of Loxosceles laeta and Sicarius ornatus, and that its bite can cause serious damage in humans, Sicarius tropicus have been also reported for having dermonecrotic and hemolytic venom.

The venom of many Sicariidae species is highly hemolytic and dermonecrotic, capable of destroying red blood cells and causing lesions as large as 1 inch (25 mm) in diameter that take a long time to heal. Some require skin grafts and if the open wound gets infected, there can be even more serious consequences. Rarely, the venom is carried by the blood stream into internal organs causing systemic effects. Unlike spiders that use neurotoxins, many of the venoms used by these spiders do not have a known anti-venom.

== Taxonomy ==
The family was first described by Eugen von Keyserling in 1880, and treated as a subfamily and synonym of "Loxoscelidae" in 1893, though this violates the rules of the International Code of Zoological Nomenclature; the publication of Sicariidae in 1880 predates the publication of Loxoscelidae in 1893, and the older name therefore has priority whenever the two are considered to be synonyms. The World Spider Catalog treats Loxoscelinae as a subfamily of Sicariidae, though some sources still recognize Loxoscelidae as a separate family (e.g.,).

A phylogenetic study in 2017 showed that the African species of Sicarius were distinct, and placed them in the revived genus Hexophthalma. The relationship found between the genera is shown in the following cladogram:

- Sicariidae
  - Loxoscelinae
    Loxosceles
  - Sicariinae
    - Hexophthalma
    - Sicarius

== Genera ==
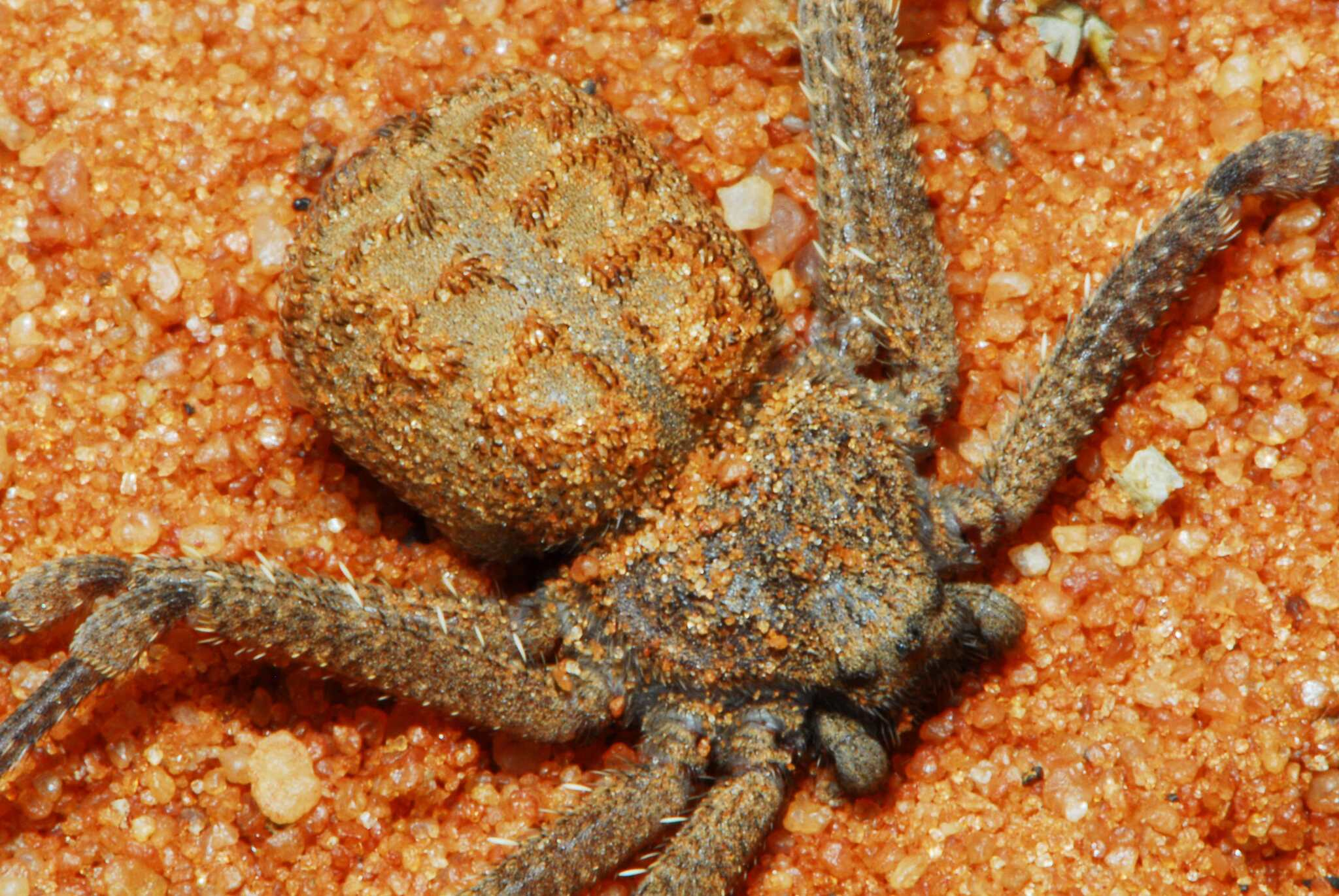
Hexophthalma hahni

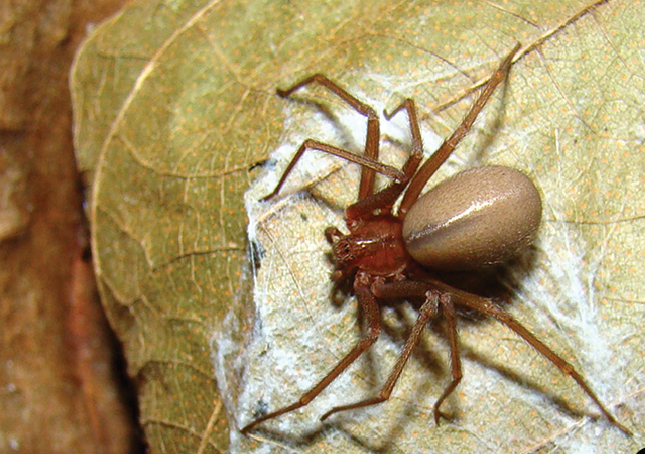
Loxosceles amazonica

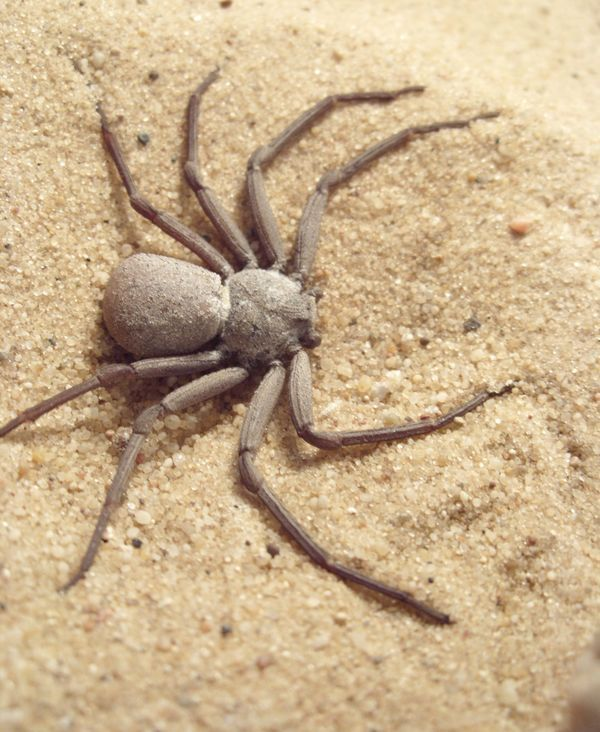
Sicarius sp.

As of October 2026, this family includes three genera and 177 species:

- Hexophthalma Karsch, 1879 – Southern Africa
- Loxosceles Heineken & Lowe, 1832 – Africa, Afghanistan, Turkmenistan, Iran, Canary Islands, North to South America. Introduced to Asia, Finland, Australia, Peru
- Sicarius Walckenaer, 1847 – Central America, South America
