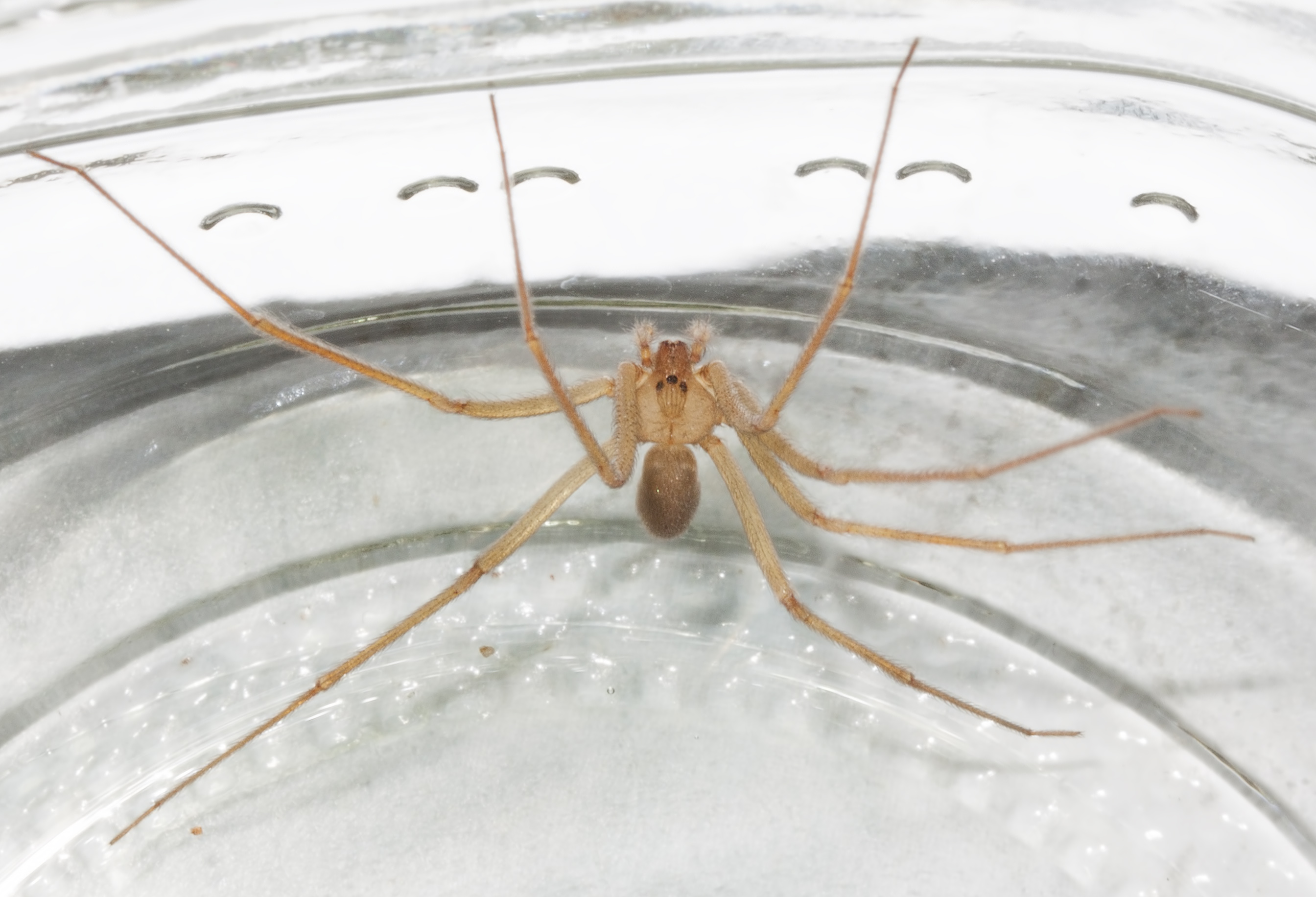

Scientific classification
- Domain: Eukaryota
- Kingdom: Animalia
- Phylum: Arthropoda
- Subphylum: Chelicerata
- Class: Arachnida
- Order: Araneae
- Infraorder: Araneomorphae
- Family: Sicariidae
- Genus: Loxosceles
- Species: L. deserta

Binomial name
- Loxosceles deserta Gertsch, 1973
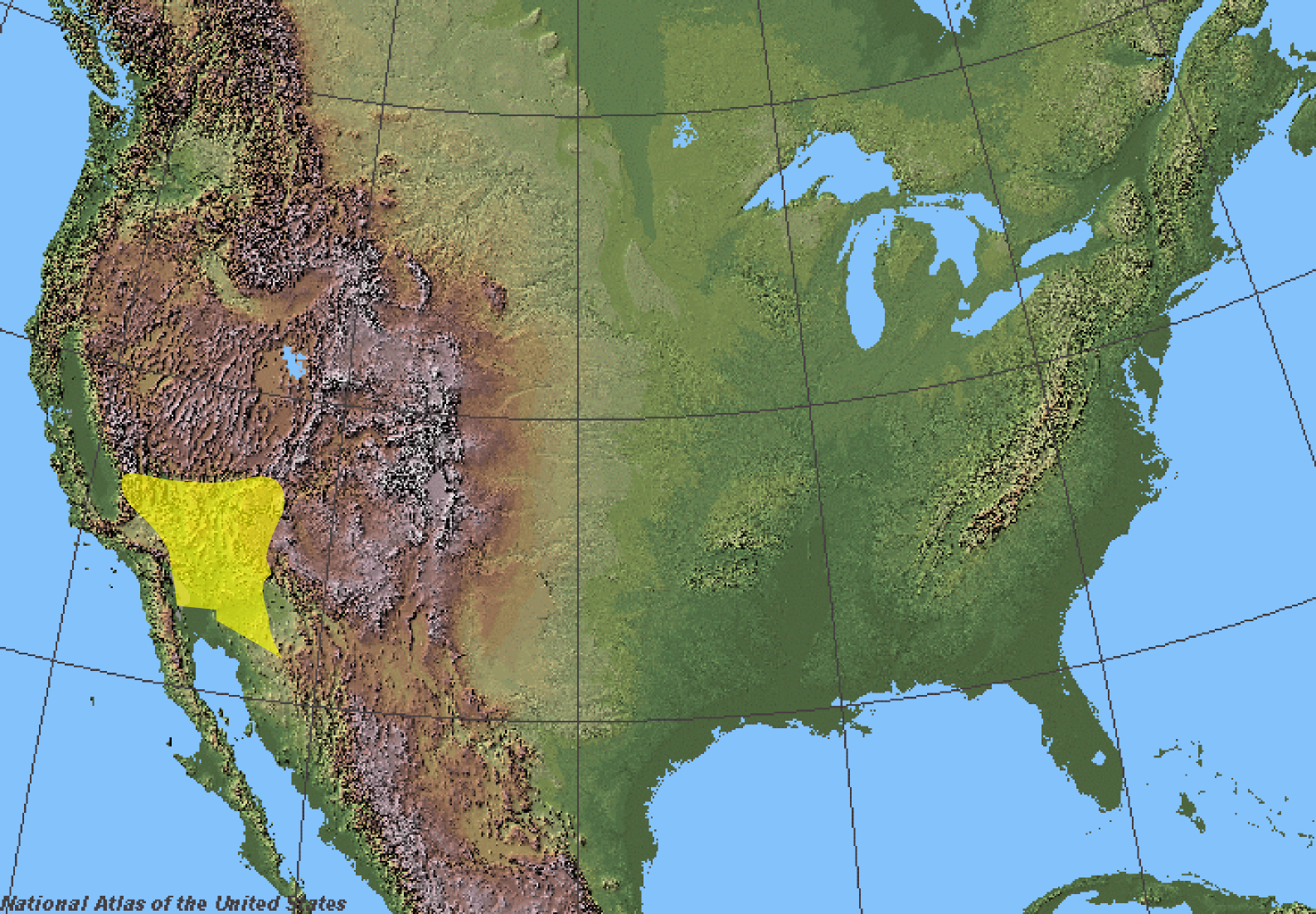
- Range of L. deserta within the United States shown in yellow. Mexican range not available.

= Loxosceles deserta =

Species of spider

Loxosceles deserta, commonly known as the desert recluse, is a recluse spider of the family Sicariidae. It is found in Mexico and the United States.

The desert recluse is commonly misidentified as L. unicolor (of South America) or as L. reclusa (the brown recluse of the southern and midwestern states), two spiders which do not live anywhere near the vicinity.

== Distribution ==
This spider is found in the eastern half of southern California, the southern tip of Nevada, the western half of Arizona, throughout northern, central, eastern, and southwestern New Mexico, the southwestern corner of Utah and into northwestern Mexico.

It dwells in the wild, and its only domestic occurrence is that near native vegetation, avoiding urban areas in the desert and even green lawns. The spiders are particularly dense in packrat dens.

== Venom ==
Lesions of the skin can be caused by the venomous bite of the desert recluse. This occurs through the same mechanism responsible for the effects of the brown recluse bite.
