= ArachnoServer =

Content
- Description: resource for spider toxin sequences and structures.
- Organisms: spider

Contact
- Research center: The University of Queensland, Brisbane, Australia
- Laboratory: Institute for Molecular Bioscience
- Primary citation: PMID 21036864
- Release date: 2009

Access
- Website: www.arachnoserver.org

ArachnoServer is a database storing information on the protein toxins from spider venoms.
