= Spider bite =

Bite caused by a spider

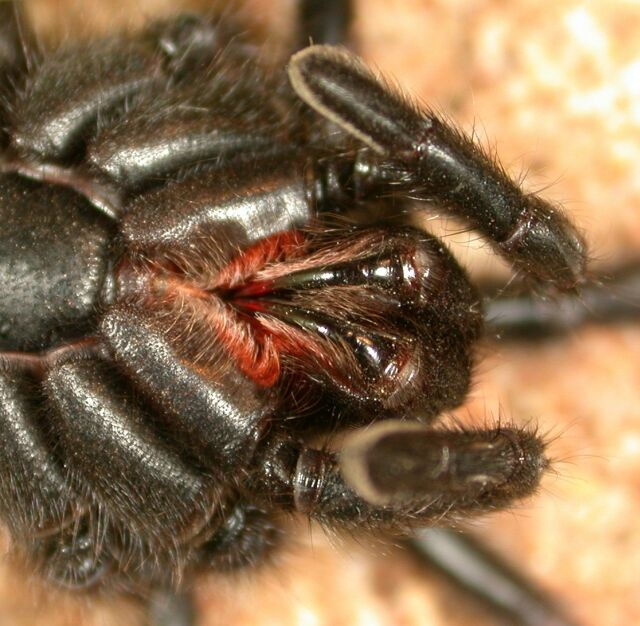
- Chelicerae of a black wishbone (nemesiid) spider, a mygalomorph
- Specialty: Emergency medicine
- Complications: Envenomation
- Causes: Spiders

A spider bite, also known as arachnidism, is an injury resulting from the bite of a spider. The effects of most bites are not serious. Most bites result in mild symptoms around the area of the bite. Rarely they may produce a necrotic skin wound or severe pain.

Most spiders do not cause bites that are of importance. For a bite to be significant, substantial envenomation is required. Bites from the widow spiders involve a neurotoxic venom which produces a condition known as latrodectism. Symptoms may include pain which may be at the bite or involve the chest and abdomen, sweating, muscle cramps and vomiting among others. Bites from the recluse spiders cause the condition loxoscelism, in which local necrosis of the surrounding skin and widespread breakdown of red blood cells may occur. Headaches, vomiting and a mild fever may also occur. Other spiders that can cause significant bites include the Australian funnel-web spider and South American wandering spider.

Efforts to prevent bites include clearing clutter and the use of pesticides. Most spider bites are managed with supportive care such as nonsteroidal anti-inflammatory drugs (including ibuprofen) for pain and antihistamines for itchiness. Opioids may be used if the pain is severe. While an antivenom exists for black widow spider venom, it is associated with anaphylaxis and therefore not commonly used in the United States. Antivenom against funnel web spider venom improves outcomes. Surgery may be required to repair the area of injured skin from some recluse bites.

Spider bites may be overdiagnosed or misdiagnosed. In many reports of spider bites it is unclear if a spider bite actually occurred. Historically a number of conditions were attributed to spider bites. In the Middle Ages a condition claimed to arise from spider bites was tarantism, where people danced wildly. While necrosis has been attributed to the bites of a number of spiders, good evidence only supports this for recluse spiders.

== Signs and symptoms ==
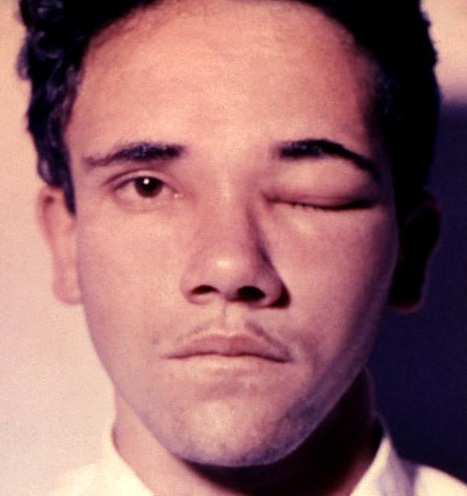
A Brazilian man 31 hours after having been bitten on his face by a recluse spider

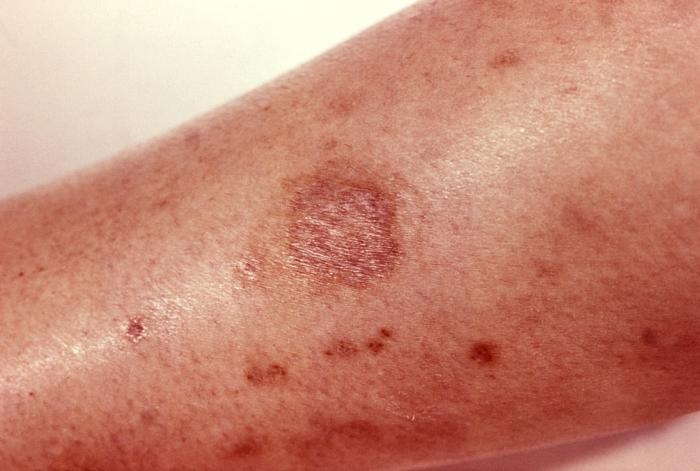
4 months after a brown recluse spider bite with scar remaining

Almost all spiders are venomous, but not all spider bites result in the injection of venom. Pain from non-venomous bites, so-called "dry bites", typically lasts for 5 to 60 minutes while pain from envenomating spider bites may last for longer than 24 hours. Bleeding also may occur with a bite. Signs of a bacterial infection due to a spider bite occur infrequently (0.9%).

A study of 750 definite spider bites in Australia indicated that 6% of spider bites cause significant effects, the vast majority of these being redback spider bites causing significant pain lasting more than 24 hours. Activation of the sympathetic nervous system can lead to sweating, high blood pressure and gooseflesh.

Most recluse spider bites are minor with little or no necrosis. However, a small number of bites produce necrotic skin lesions. First pain and tenderness at the site begin. The redness changes over two to three days to a bluish sinking patch of dead skin—the hallmark of necrosis. The wound heals slowly over months but usually completely. Rarely, bites may cause widespread symptoms, with occasional fatalities.

There are a few spiders that can bite human skin and cause a skin reaction, but spiders are blamed for many more reactions. In particular the misdiagnosis of infections and other skin ailments are commonly attributed to brown recluses.

Spiders associated with skin reactions
Scientific name	Common name	Venom	Reaction
Lampona spp	White-tailed		Welt
Loxosceles spp	Brown recluse	Sphingomyelinase	Necrosis
Cheiracanthium spp	Sac	Lipase	Redness
Tegenaria agrestis	Hobo		Redness
Lycosidae spp	Wolf		Redness, itching

== Cause ==
Spiders do not feed on humans and typically bites occur as a defense mechanism. This can occur from unintentional contact or trapping of the spider. Most spiders have fangs too small to penetrate human skin. Most bites by species large enough for their bites to be noticeable will have no serious medical consequences.

Medically significant spider venoms include various combinations and concentrations of necrotic agents, neurotoxins, and pharmacologically active compounds such as serotonin. Worldwide only two spider venoms have impact on humans—those of the widow and recluse spiders. Unlike snake and scorpion envenomation, widow and recluse species bites rarely have fatal consequences. In addition to the widespread widow and recluse spiders, some spider families found exclusively in remote tropical regions have a lethal neurotoxic venom: the wandering spider in Brazil and the funnel web in Australia. However, due to limited contact between these spiders and humans, deaths have always been rare, and since the introduction of anti-venom in Australia, there have been no funnel web related deaths.

== Pathophysiology ==
A primary concern of the bite of a spider is the effect of its venom. A spider envenomation occurs whenever a spider injects venom into the skin. Not all spider bites involve injection of venom, and the amount of venom injected can vary based on the type of spider and the circumstances of the encounter. The mechanical injury from a spider bite is not a serious concern for humans. However, it is generally the toxicity of spider venom that poses the most risk to human beings; several spiders are known to have venom that can cause injury to humans in the amounts that a spider could inject when biting. While venoms are by definition toxic substances, most spiders do not have venom that is directly toxic (in the quantities delivered) to require medical attention and, of those that do, severity is typically mild.

Spider venoms work on one of two fundamental principles; they are either neurotoxic (attacking the nervous system) or necrotic (attacking tissues surrounding the bite). In some cases, the venom affects vital organs and systems. The venoms of the widow spiders, Brazilian wandering spider and Australian funnel-web are neurotoxic. Heart muscle damage is an unusual complication of widow venom that may lead to death. Pulmonary edema, which is fluid accumulation in the lungs, is a feared and potentially serious but uncommon complication of funnel-web venom. Recluse and South African sand spider venoms are necrotic. Recluse venom may also cause severe hemolysis (destruction of red blood cells), though this is typically uncommon.

== Diagnosis ==
Reliable diagnoses of spider bites require three conditions: first, there should be clinical effects of the bite at the time or soon afterwards, although there are no symptoms universally diagnostic of a spider bite, and bites by some spiders, e.g. Loxosceles species, may initially be painless; second, the spider should be collected, either at the time of the bite or immediately afterwards; and third, the spider should be identified by an expert arachnologist.

Spider bites are commonly misdiagnosed. A review published in 2016 showed that 78% of 134 published medical case studies of supposed spider bites did not meet the necessary criteria for a spider bite to be verified. In the case of the two genera with the highest reported number of bites, Loxosceles and Latrodectus, spider bites were not verified in over 90% of the reports. Even when verification had occurred, details of the treatment and its effects were often lacking. Unverified bite reports likely represent many other conditions, both infectious and non-infectious, which can be confused with spider bites. Many of these conditions are far more common and more likely to be the source of necrotic wounds. An affected person may think that a wound is a spider bite when it is actually an infection with methicillin-resistant Staphylococcus aureus (MRSA). False reports of spider bites in some cases have led to misdiagnosis and mistreatment, with potentially life-threatening consequences.

== Prevention ==
Efforts to prevent bites include clearing clutter and the use of pesticides.

OSHA recommends that workers take following measures to prevent spider bite:

- Wear a long-sleeved shirt, hat, gloves, and boots when handling boxes, firewood, lumber, rocks, etc.
- Inspect and shake out clothing and shoes before getting dressed.
- Use insect repellents, such as DEET or Picaridin, on clothing and footwear.

== Management ==
Most spider bites are harmless and require no specific treatment. Treatment of bites may depend on the type of spider; thus, capture of the spider—either alive, or in a well-preserved condition, is useful.

Treatment of spider bites includes washing the wound with soap and water and ice to reduce inflammation. Analgesics and antihistamines may be used; however, antibiotics are not recommended unless there is also a bacterial infection present. Black widow post-envenomation treatment seeks to control resulting pain and nausea.

In the case of bites by widow spiders, Australian funnel-web spiders, or Brazilian wandering spiders, medical attention should be sought immediately as in some cases the bites of these spiders develop into a medical emergency. Antivenom is available for severe widow and funnel-web envenomation.

=== Necrosis ===
In almost all cases, recluse bites are self-limited and typically heal without any medical intervention. Recommendations to limit the extent of damage include elevation and immobilization of the affected limb, and application of ice. Both local wound care and tetanus prophylaxis, are simple standards. There is no established treatment for more extensive necrosis. Many therapies have been used including hyperbaric oxygen, dapsone, antihistamines (e.g., cyproheptadine), antibiotics, dextran, glucocorticoids, vasodilators, heparin, nitroglycerin, electric shock, curettage, surgical excision, and antivenom. None of these treatments conclusively show benefit. Studies have shown surgical intervention is ineffective and may worsen outcome. Excision may delay wound healing, cause abscesses, and lead to objectionable scarring.

Dapsone, an antibiotic, is commonly used in the United States and Brazil for the treatment of necrosis. There have been conflicting reports with some supporting its efficacy and others have suggested it should no longer be used routinely, if at all.

=== Antivenom ===
Use of antivenom for severe spider bites may be indicated, especially in the case of neurotoxic venoms. Effective antivenoms exist for Latrodectus, Atrax, and Phoneutria venom. Antivenom in the United States is in intravenous form but is rarely used, as anaphylactic reaction to the antivenom has resulted in deaths. In Australia, antivenom in intramuscular form was once commonly used, but use has declined. In 2014 some doubt as to antivenom effectiveness has been raised. In South America an antivenom is available for Loxosceles bites, and it appears antivenom may be the most promising therapy for recluse bites. However, in experimental trials recluse antivenom is more effective when given early, and patients often do not present for 24 or more hours after envenomation, possibly limiting the effect of such intervention.

== Epidemiology ==
Estimating the number of spider bites that occur is difficult as the spider involvement may not be confirmed or identified. Several researchers recommend only evaluating verified bites: those that have an eyewitness to the bite, the spider is brought in, and identified by expert. With "suspected arachnidism" the diagnosis came without a spider positively identified.

=== Africa ===
Several Latrodectus species (button spiders) live in Africa. South Africa also has six-eyed sand spiders (Hexophthalma species), whose bite may potentially cause skin necrosis. Physicians are advised that the diagnosis may be difficult without a spider.

=== Australia ===
Bites by the redbacks (Latrodectus hasselti) number a few thousand yearly throughout the country. Antivenom use is frequent but declining. Children may have fewer complications from bites. Funnel web spider bites are few 30–40 per year and 10% requiring intervention. The Sydney funnel web and related species are only on the east coast of Australia.

=== Europe ===
In Switzerland about ten to one hundred spider bites occur per one million people per year. During epidemics of latrodectism from the European black widow upwards of 150 bites a year were documented.

=== North America ===
The American Association of Poison Control Centers reported that they received calls regarding nearly 10,000 spider bites in 1994. The spiders of most concern in North America are brown recluse spiders, with nearly 1,500 bites in 2013 and black widow spiders with 1,800 bites. of which a dozen involved major complications. The native habitat of brown recluse spiders is in the southern and central United States, as far north as Iowa. Encounters with brown recluse outside this native region are very rare and bites are thought to be suspect.

=== South America ===
Numerous spider bites are recorded in Brazil with 5000+ annually. Loxosceles species are responsible for the majority of reports. Accidents are concentrated in the southern state of Parana with rates as high as 1 per 1,000 people. Bite from Phoneutria (Brazilian wandering spider) number in the thousands with most being mild. Severe effects are noted in 0.5% of cases, mostly in children.

== History ==
Recorded treatment from the 1890s for spider bites in general was rubbing in tobacco juice to the bitten skin, similar to some of the traditional uses of the tobacco plant for various bites and stings from Central and South America. Wild dancing and music was the cure for tarantism—the frenzy was believed to arise from the bite of a spider. An antivenom was developed against wolf spiders in Brazil and used for decades. Wolf spiders have since been exonerated—they never caused illness.

== See also ==
- ArachnoServer database
- Raventoxin
- Vanillotoxin
- List of medically significant spider bites
