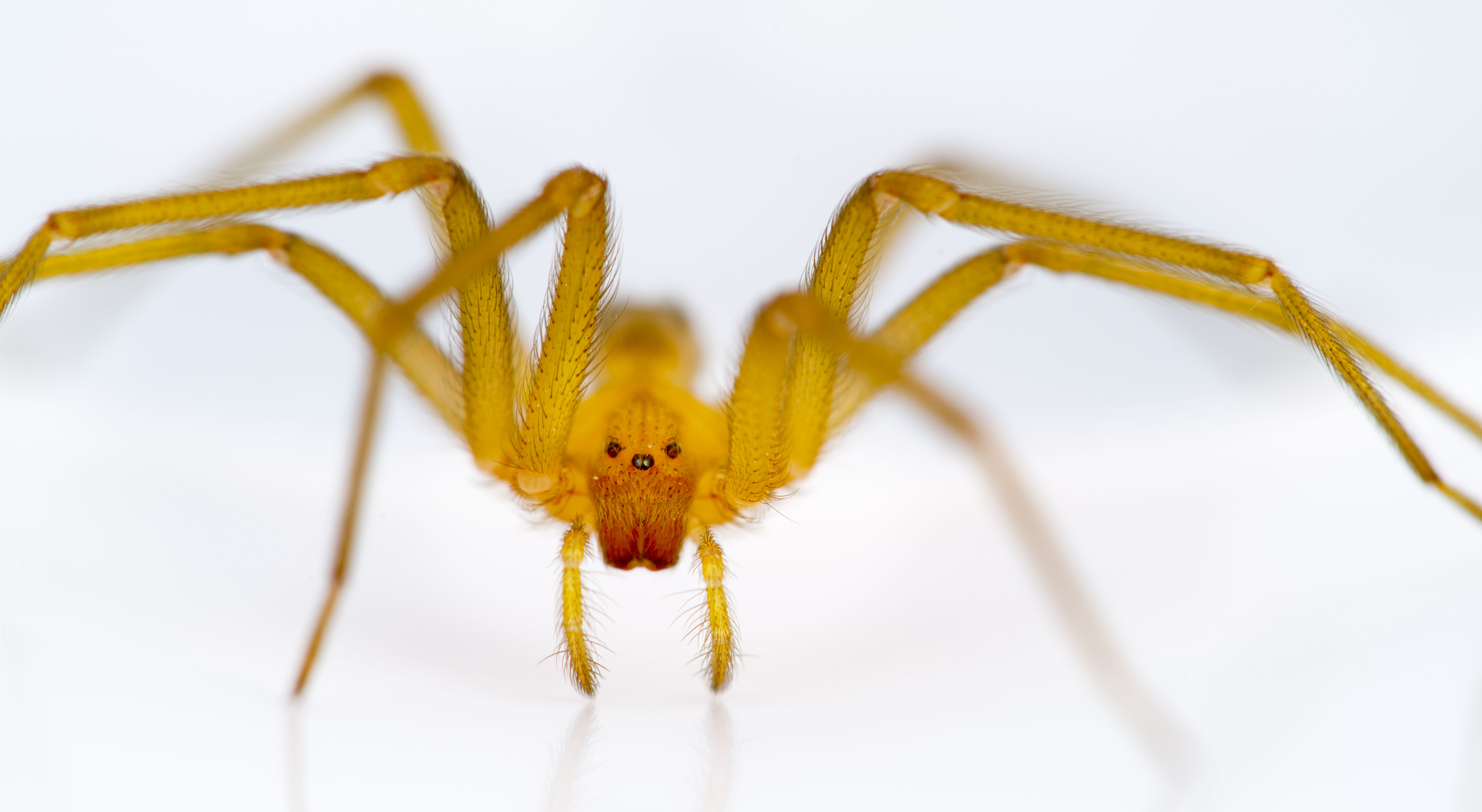
- Immature female

Scientific classification
- Kingdom: Animalia
- Phylum: Arthropoda
- Subphylum: Chelicerata
- Class: Arachnida
- Order: Araneae
- Infraorder: Araneomorphae
- Family: Sicariidae
- Genus: Loxosceles
- Species: L. laeta

Binomial name
- Loxosceles laeta (Nicolet, 1849)

Synonyms
- Scytodes laeta Nicolet, 1849; Scytodes rufipes Nicolet, 1849; Scytodes nigella Nicolet, 1849; Omosita bicolor Holmberg, 1876; Loxosceles longipalpis Banks, 1902; Loxosceles nesophila Chamberlin, 1920; Loxosceles yura Chamberlin & Ivie, 1942

= Chilean recluse spider =

Species of arachnid

The Chilean recluse spider, Loxosceles laeta, is a highly venomous spider of the family Sicariidae. In Spanish, it (and other South American recluse spiders) is known as araña de rincón, or "corner spider"; in Brazilian Portuguese, it is called aranha-marrom, or "brown spider". It is considered to be the most dangerous of recluse spiders, and its bite often results in serious systemic reactions, up to and including death.

== Description ==
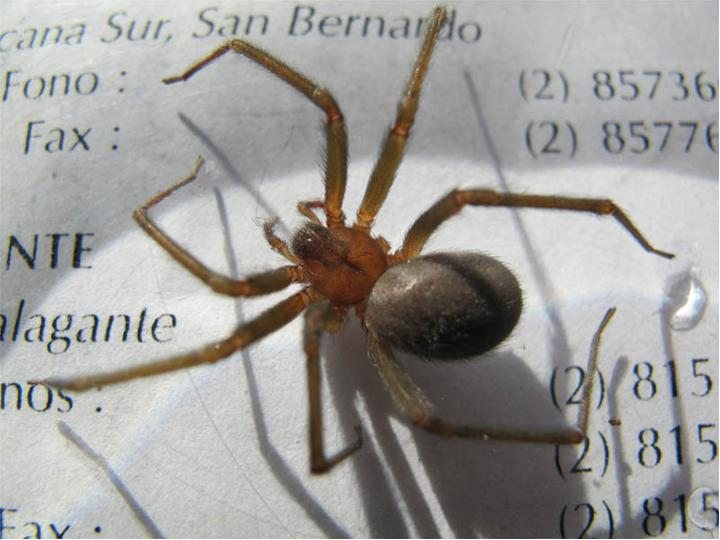
Adult specimen captured in Santiago, Chile. The 'reverse violin' pattern is visible on its thorax.

The Chilean recluse is one of the larger species of recluse spiders, generally ranging from 8–40 mm in size (including legs). Like most recluses, it is brown and usually has markings on the dorsal side of its thorax, with a black line coming from it that looks like a violin with the neck of the violin pointing to the rear of the spider resulting in the nickname "fiddleback spider" or "violin spider" in English-speaking areas. Coloring varies from light tan to brown and the violin marking may not be visible. Since the "violin pattern" is not diagnostic, it is far more important, for purposes of identification, to examine the eyes. Most spiders have eight eyes, but recluse spiders have six eyes arranged in pairs (dyads) with one median pair and two lateral pairs.

Like other recluse spiders, the Chilean recluse builds irregular webs that frequently include a shelter consisting of disorderly threads. Unlike most web weavers, they leave these webs at night to hunt. People get bitten when they unintentionally squeeze them in clothing and bedding. They frequently build their webs in woodpiles and sheds, closets, garages, and other places that are dry and generally undisturbed. The spider is frequently found in human dwellings. They can survive for a long time without food or water, a characteristic that encourages their worldwide spread.

== Habitat ==
The Chilean recluse spider is native to South America. It is common in Chile, and can be found in Peru, Ecuador, Argentina, Uruguay, and south and eastern Brazil.

It has been introduced into several areas outside its natural range but does not thrive in those locations. The spider is known to have established itself in the Los Angeles area. It has been reported in the United States, Canada, and Australia. One colony of the spider is living in the Natural History Museum of Helsinki, where it was probably introduced through fruit shipments in the 1960s and 1970s. Although the museum has often been visited regularly by local schools, preschools and daycares, only one bite has ever been recorded. In 2021, the spider was also found in three different school buildings in the town of Sandviken, Sweden. In 2025, a specimen was found on the campus of the University of Tübingen, in Germany.

== Medical significance ==
As indicated by its name (laeta meaning "happy"), this spider is not aggressive and usually bites only when pressed against human skin, such as when putting on an article of clothing. Like all sicariid spiders, the venom of the Chilean recluse contains the dermonecrotic agent sphingomyelinase D, which is otherwise found only in a few pathogenic bacteria. According to one study, the venom of the Chilean recluse along with the six-eyed sand spider Hexophthalma hahni, contains an order of magnitude more of this substance than that of other sicariid spiders such as the brown recluse. For a comparison of the toxicity of several kinds of spider bites, see the list of spiders having medically significant venom.

=== Effects of venom ===
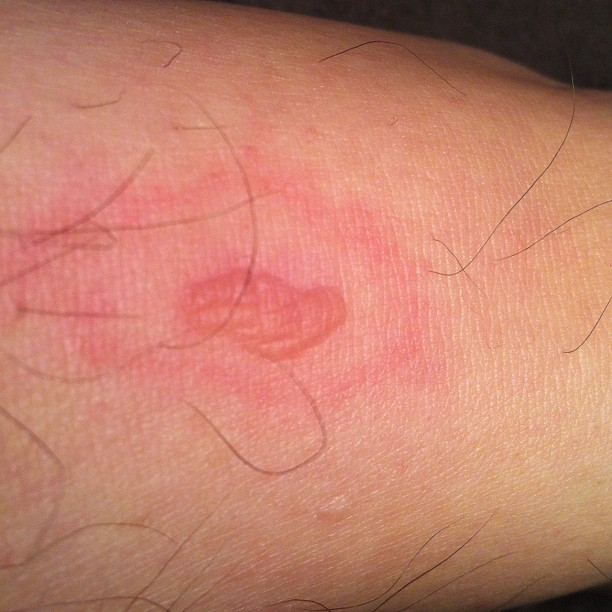
A skin ulcer of a bite from the Chilean recluse, this bite will remain as a scar, or possibly even rot away.

The symptoms associated with Chilean recluse venom may range from a minor bite with mild skin irritation, to severe skin necrosis, called cutaneous loxoscelism, to a condition called viscerocutaneous loxoscelism, in 10-15% of cases, that causes necrosis of the victim's organs. Cutaneous loxoscelism results from serious bites causing a necrotising skin ulcer in about 50% of bites with destruction of soft tissue and may take months, and rarely years to heal, leaving deep scars. The damaged tissue will become gangrenous black and eventually slough away. Initially there may be no pain from a bite, but over time the wound may grow to as large as 10 inches (25 cm) in extreme cases. Bites are felt initially but may take up to seven hours to cause visible damage; more serious systemic effects may occur before this time, as venom of any kind spreads throughout the body in minutes. Viscerocutaneous loxoscelism manifests with skin blanching due to vasoconstriction, sometimes a dengue-like scarlatiniform rash, hemolysis, sometimes resulting in hemoglobinuria, hemolytic anemia and acute tubular necrosis leading to kidney failure, and death in 3%–4% of cases per a study covering 30 years of bites in Chile. In a single year (2005) no deaths were reported. In Peru, viscerocutaneous loxoscelism occurs in 27.2% of cases, in Chile it occurs in 15.7% and in the state of Santa Catarina, in Brazil it occurs in 13.1%. In a period from 1955 to 2000 250 cases of Loxoscelism were studied in Santiago, Chile, cutaneous loxoscelism occurred in 81.2% of the cases (203), while the most severe form, viscerocutaneous loxoscelism, occurred in 18.8% (47). Of the 47 who had viscerocutaneous loxoscelism, 9 died, representing a mortality rate of 19.1%, 6 were women and 3 were men, aged 2 to 37 years, 6 occurred in the summer, two in the fall and one in the winter. Loxosceles laeta can produce 60 μg of venom by electrostimulation, compared to 30-40 μg of Loxosceles intermedia and Loxosceles gaucho.

== Treatment ==
Application of an ice pack helps as first aid, because the venom is more active at high temperatures. Applying aloe vera may soothe and help control the pain.

Antidote results have been discouraging. Retrospective data are limited because they lack a definition of time to antivenom administration and its relation to outcome.

In South America, dapsone has been tried at 100 mg/day for one week, unless there is active hemolysis or G6PD deficiency. No controlled trials have been reported; the practice is controversial, but clinical experience in Peru and several limited studies support this practice. Systemic corticosteroids are often considered, but without clinical trials to support the practice.
