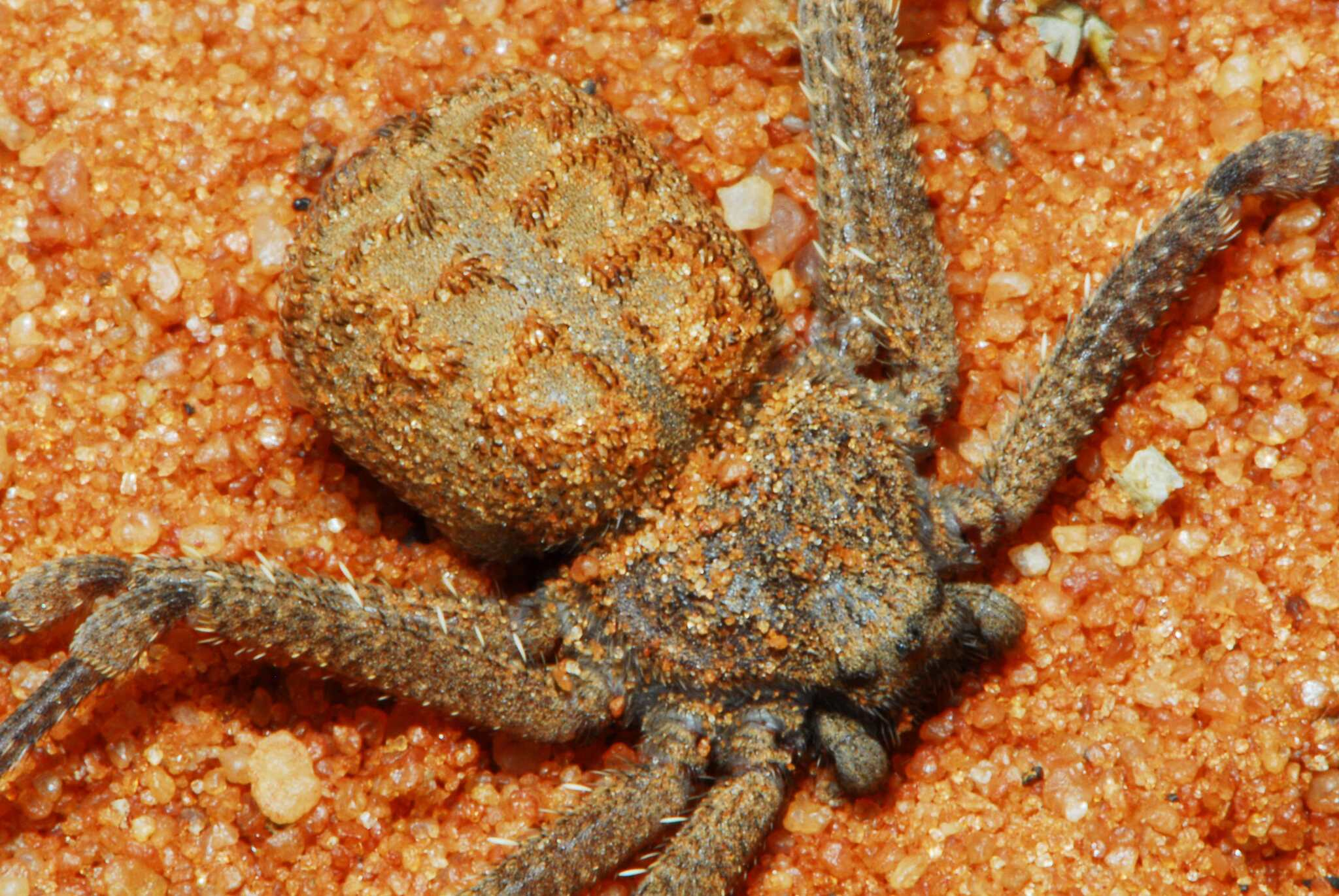
- Female
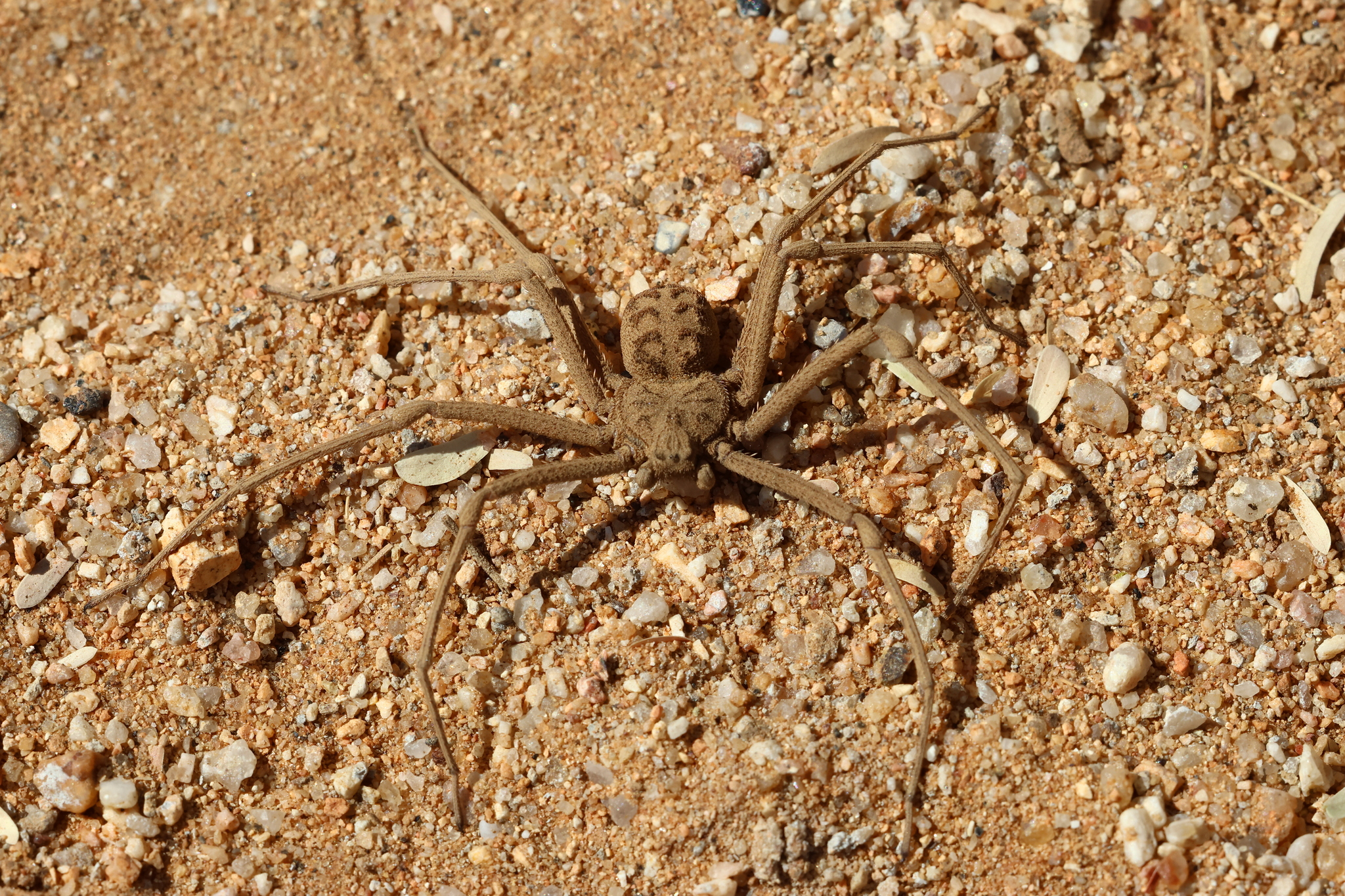

Scientific classification
- Kingdom: Animalia
- Phylum: Arthropoda
- Subphylum: Chelicerata
- Class: Arachnida
- Order: Araneae
- Infraorder: Araneomorphae
- Family: Sicariidae
- Genus: Hexophthalma
- Species: H. hahni

Binomial name
- Hexophthalma hahni (Karsch, 1878)

Synonyms
- Hexomma hahnii Karsch, 1878; Sicarius hahni (Karsch, 1878); Sicarius testaceus Purcell, 1908; Hexophthalma testacea (Purcell, 1908)

= Hexophthalma hahni =

Hahn's Six-eyed Sand Spider

Species of spider

Hexophthalma hahni is a species of spider in the family Sicariidae. It is endemic to deserts and other sandy places in southern Africa and is commonly known as Hahn's six-eyed sand spider.

Due to their flattened stance and laterigrade legs, they are also sometimes known as six-eyed crab spiders.

== Distribution ==
Hexophthalma hahni occurs in Namibia, Zimbabwe, and South Africa. In South Africa, it is recorded from five provinces occurring in more than 10 protected areas at altitudes ranging from 14 to 1466 m above sea level.

== Habitat and ecology ==
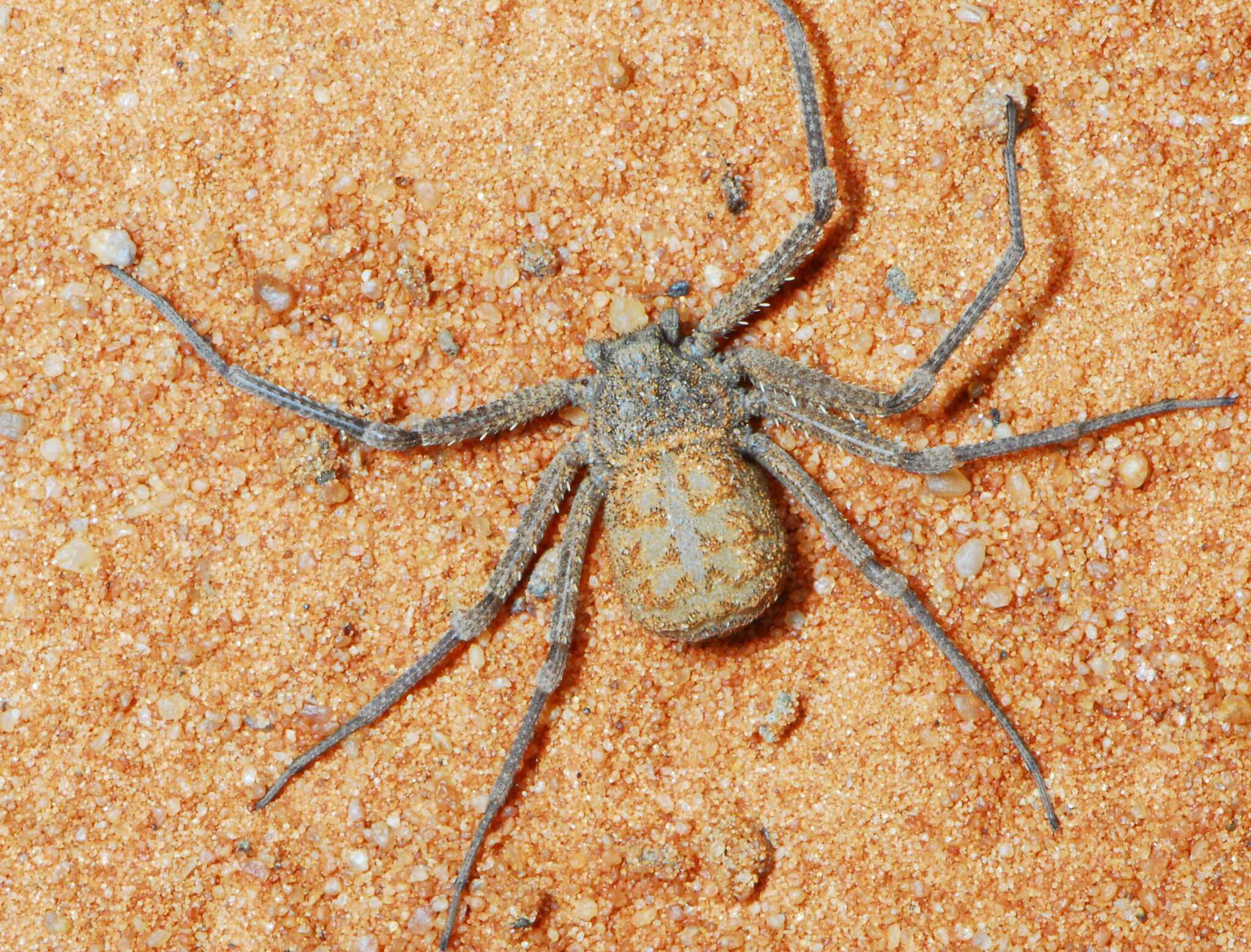

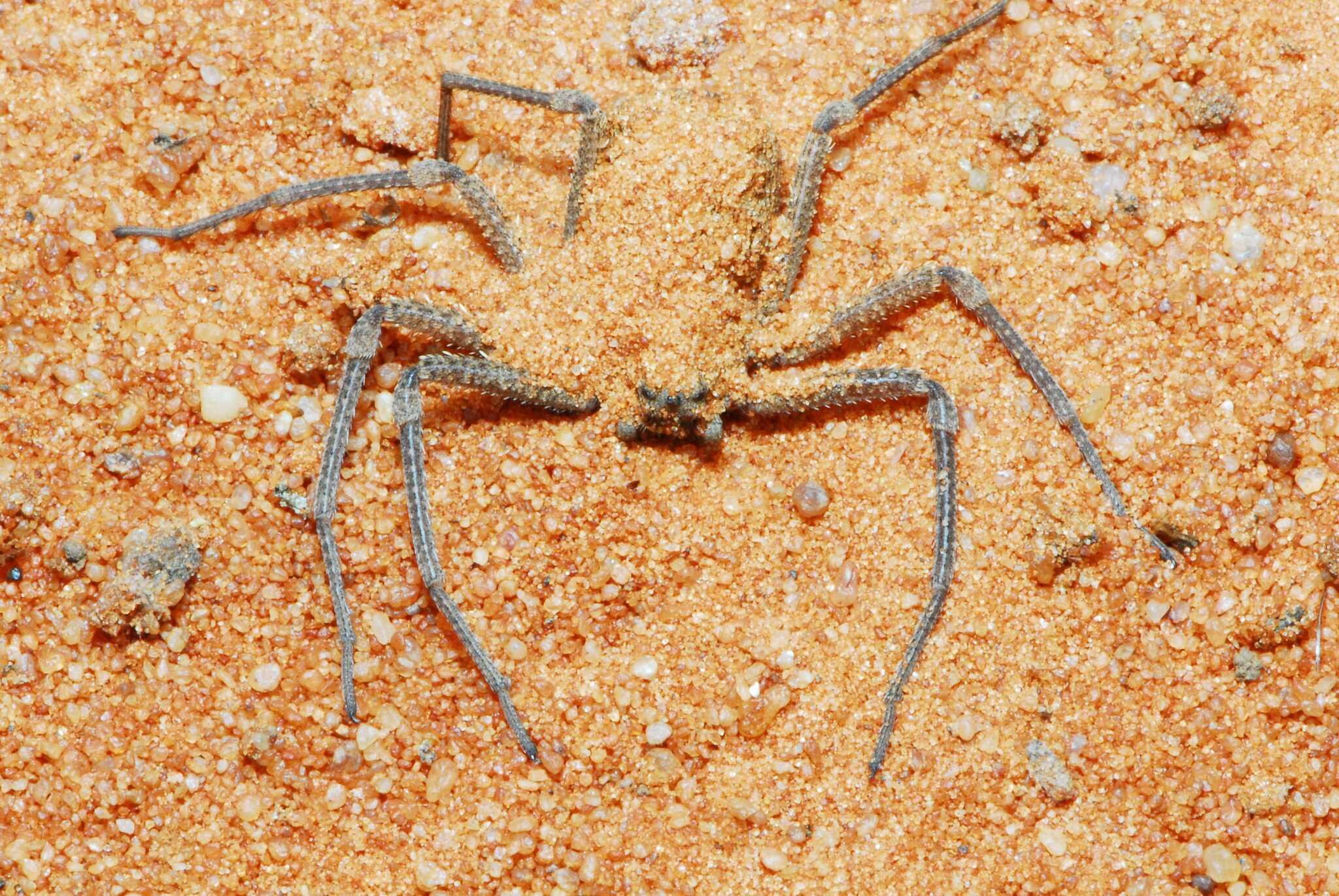

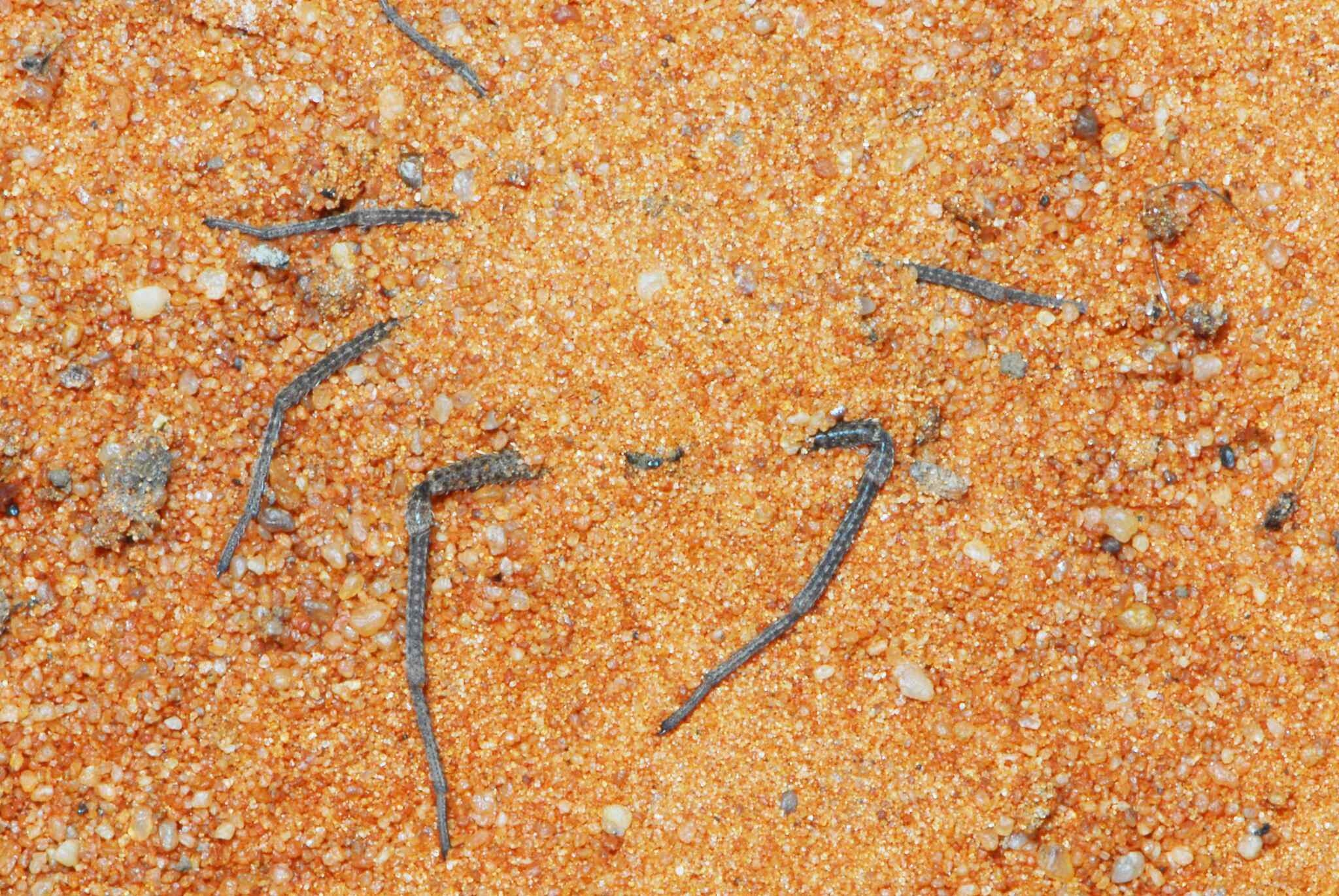

The species inhabits multiple biomes including Desert biome, Grassland, Fynbos, Nama Karoo, Savanna and Succulent Karoo biomes. Specimens are found beneath stones in sandy areas, buried in sand at the entrances of animal burrows and at the base of rock overhangs or cliff faces.

== Venom ==
All species of Hexophthalma produce venom that can have dermonecrotic effects, capable of causing serious or even life-threatening wounds, particularly if the wound becomes infected or the venom spreads in the body. The necrotic effects are caused by a family of proteins related to sphingomyelinase D, present in the venom of all sicariid spiders. Most Hexophthalma species, though, including H. hahnii, have only been studied in vitro, and the detailed effects of their venom in humans and other vertebrates are unknown. No records of bites in southern Africa have been proven.

== Description ==
The six-eyed sand spider is a medium-to-large arid-dwelling spider native to deserts and scrublands in southern Africa. Its body and legs are coated with short, velvety hairs, particularly for collecting sand and dust, which enable it to blend into the surrounding terrain almost perfectly. Instead of building webs, the spider spends most of its time flattened against the ground or lightly covered with loose soil, depending on stillness and camouflage rather than detection. The spider's eye arrangement consists of three pairs, thus giving it a low, narrow field of vision better suited to sensing movement on or near the ground. The legs are long and widely spaced, allowing the spider to shift across loose sand very quickly when disturbed. The spider is capable of inflicting a medically significant bite, but the likelihood of coming into contact with humans is low due to its reclusive nature and preference for untouched, open habitats.

== Conservation ==
Hexophthalma hahni is listed as Least Concern by the South African National Biodiversity Institute due to its wide geographical range. The species is protected in several protected areas including Karoo National Park, Blouberg Nature Reserve, Kruger National Park, Tswalu Game Reserve, Namaqua National Park, Swartberg Nature Reserve, Cederberg Wilderness Area and Kalahari Gemsbok National Park.

== Etymology ==
The species is named after Carl Wilhelm Hahn, a German arachnologist who made significant contributions to spider taxonomy.

== Taxonomy ==
The species was originally described by Ferdinand Karsch in 1878 as Hexomma hahnii from Namibia. It was later moved to Hexophthalma by Karsch in 1879 as a generic replacement name. The species has been revised by Lotz (2012, 2018) and synonymized with Hexophthalma testacea. It is known from both sexes and serves as the type species for the genus Hexophthalma.
