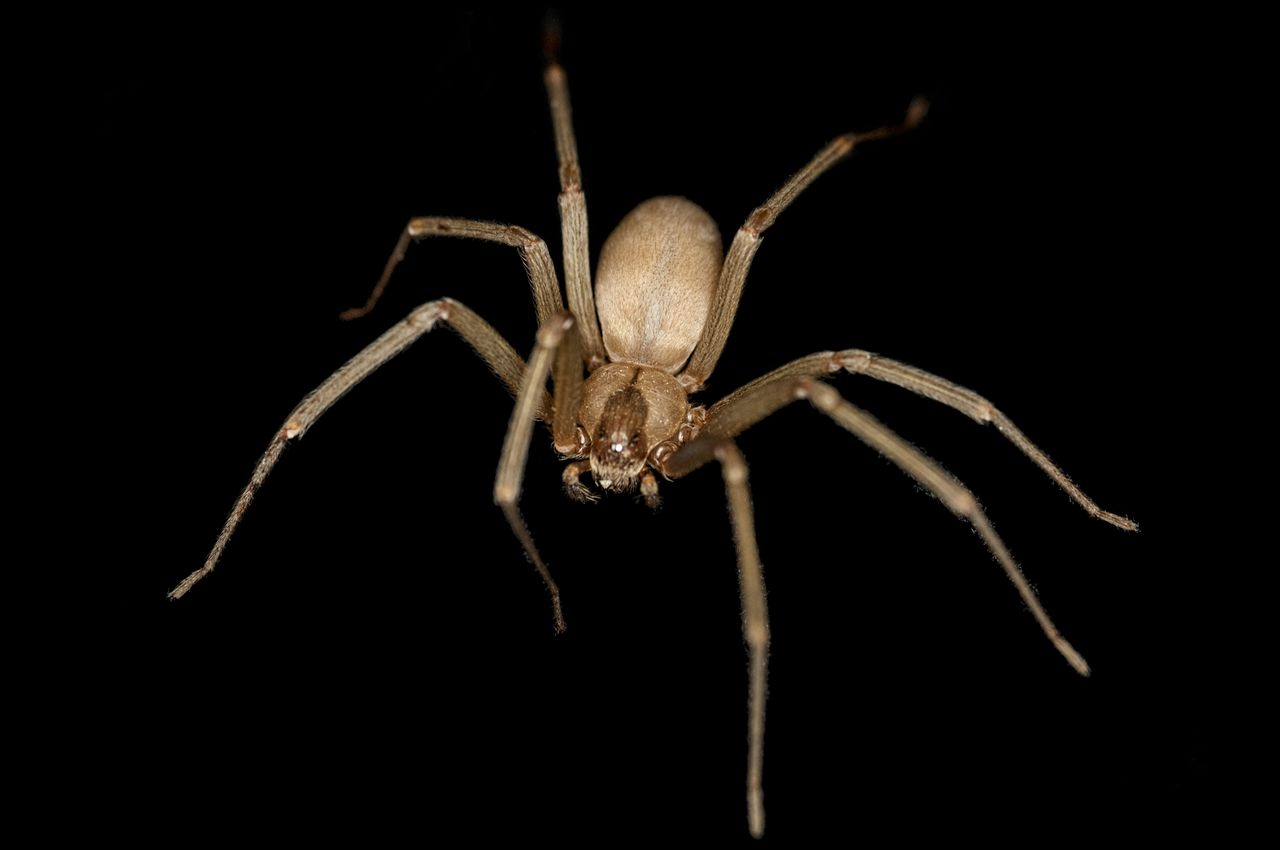

Scientific classification
- Kingdom: Animalia
- Phylum: Arthropoda
- Subphylum: Chelicerata
- Class: Arachnida
- Order: Araneae
- Infraorder: Araneomorphae
- Family: Sicariidae
- Genus: Loxosceles
- Species: L. reclusa

Binomial name
- Loxosceles reclusa Gertsch & Mulaik, 1940
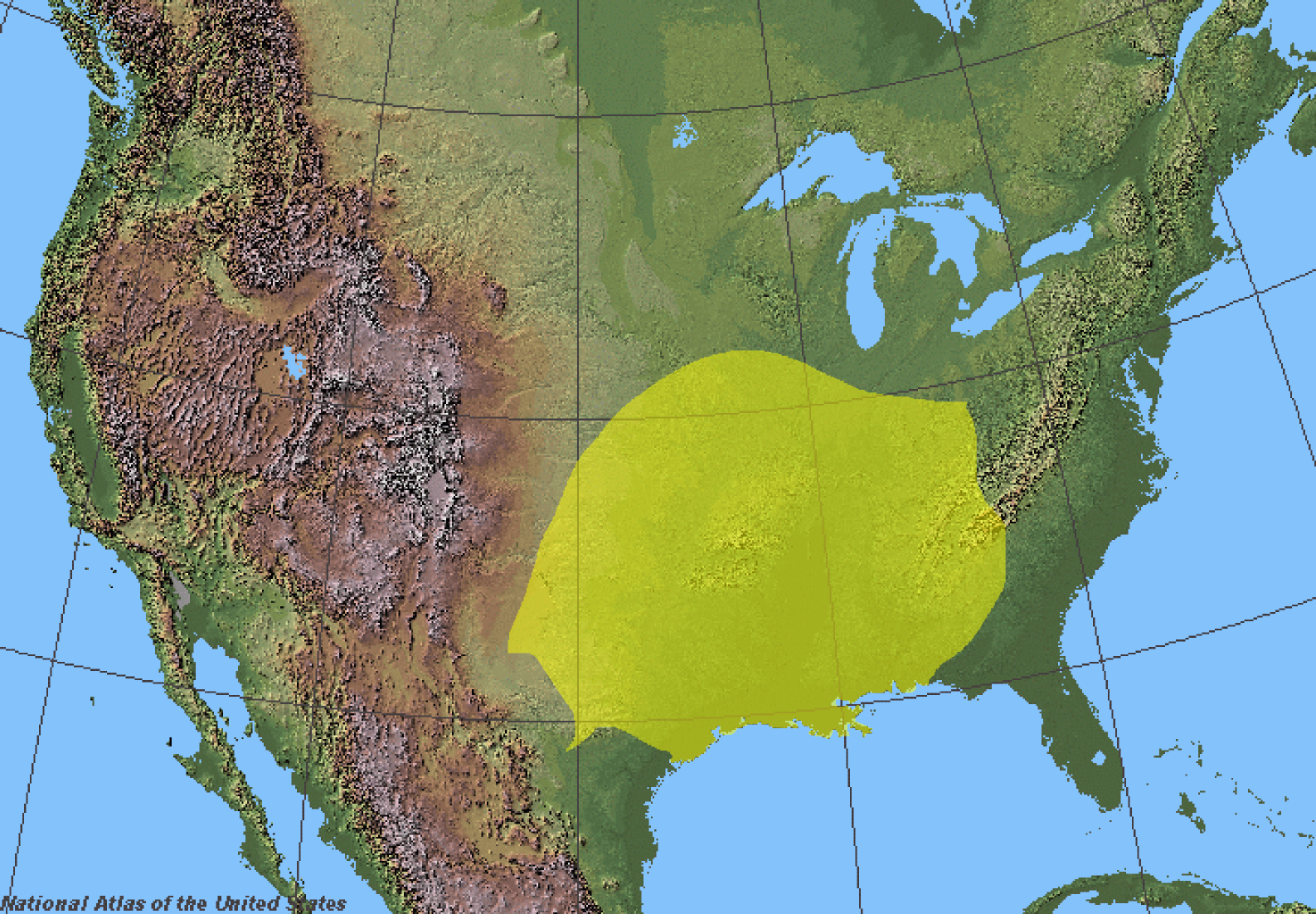

Synonyms
- Loxosceles reclusus orthographic variant

= Brown recluse spider =

Brown recluse

Species of spider with venomous bite native to US

The brown recluse (Loxosceles reclusa, Sicariidae, formerly placed in a family "Loxoscelidae") is a recluse spider with necrotic venom. Similar to those of other recluse spiders, their bites sometimes require medical attention. The brown recluse is one of two spiders in North America with dangerous venom, the other being the black widow.

Brown recluse spiders are usually between 6 and 20 millimetres (0.24 and 0.79 in), but may grow larger. While typically light to medium brown, they range in color from whitish to dark brown or blackish gray. The cephalothorax and abdomen are not necessarily the same color. These spiders usually have markings on the dorsal side of their cephalothorax, with a black line coming from it that looks like a violin with the neck of the violin pointing to the rear of the spider, resulting in the nicknames fiddleback spider, brown fiddler, or violin spider.

== Description ==
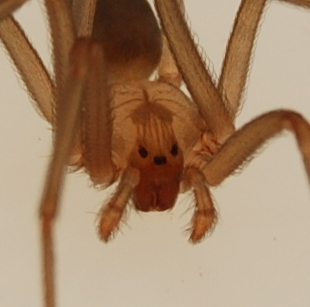
The brown recluse has three pairs of eyes, unlike most spiders with four pairs of eyes.

The violin pattern is not a definitive identifier, as other spiders can have similar markings (e.g. cellar spiders and pirate spiders). Instead, while most spiders have eight eyes, recluse spiders have six eyes arranged in pairs (dyads) with one median pair and two lateral pairs. Only a few other spiders have three pairs of eyes arranged in this way (e.g., scytodids). Recluses have no obvious coloration patterns on the abdomen or legs, and the legs lack spines. The violin marking can vary in intensity depending on the age of the brown recluse spider, with mature spiders typically having dark violin shapes.

== Distribution ==
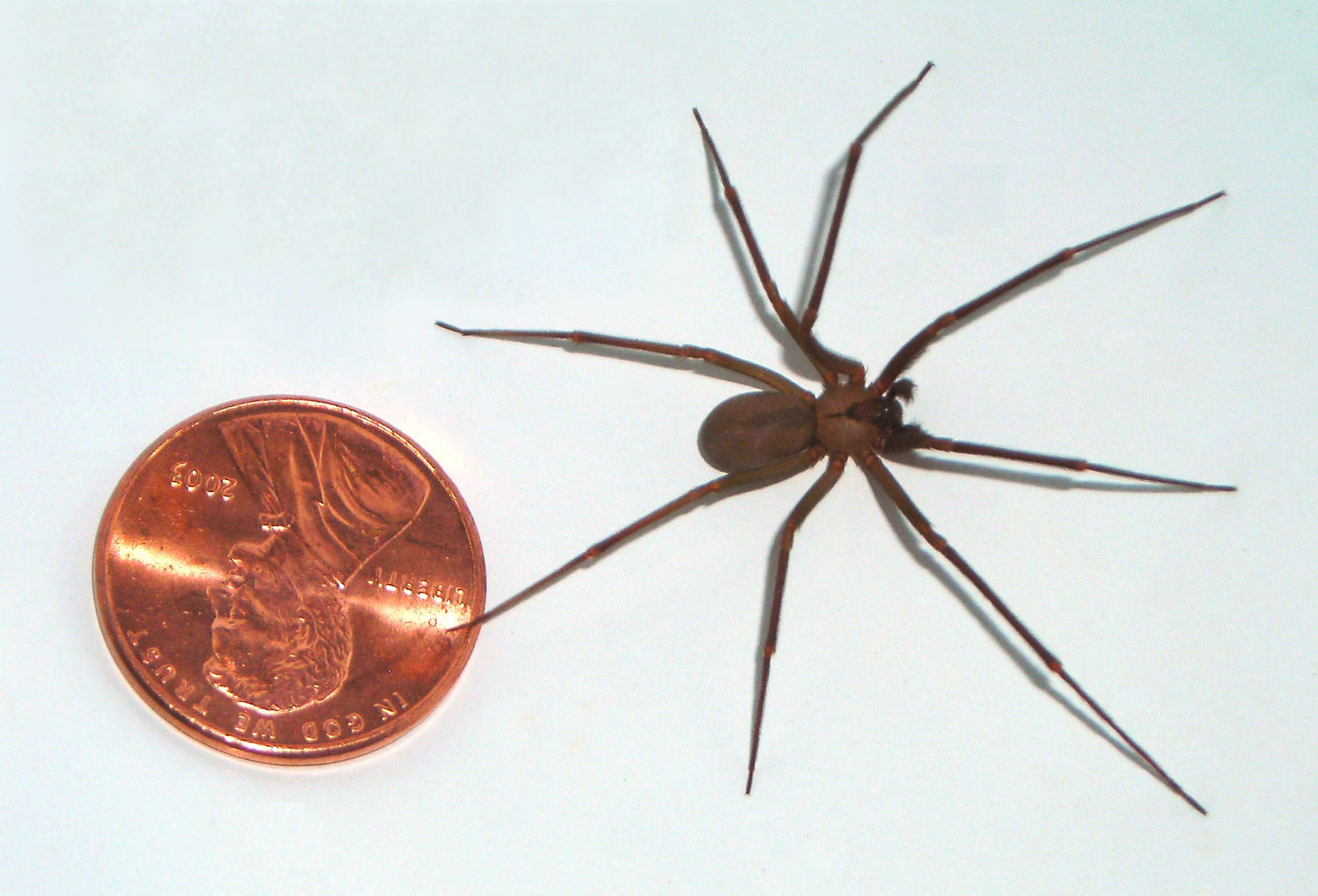
A large brown recluse compared to a US penny (diameter 0.75 inches or 19 millimetres)

The documented range of this species lies roughly south of a line from southeastern Nebraska through southern Iowa, Illinois, and Indiana to southwestern Ohio. In the southern states, it is native from central Texas to western Georgia and north to Kentucky.

Despite rumors to the contrary, the brown recluse spider has not established itself in California or anywhere outside its native range. There are other species of the genus Loxosceles native to the southwestern part of the United States, including California, which may resemble the brown recluse, but interactions between humans and the recluse species in California and the region are rare because those species' native ranges lie outside of dense human populations. The number of "false positive" reports based on misidentifications is considerable; in a nationwide study where people submitted spiders that they thought were brown recluses, of 581 from California only one was a brown recluse—submitted by a family that moved from Missouri and brought it with them (compared to specimens submitted from Missouri, Kansas, and Oklahoma, where between 75% and 90% were recluses). From this study, the most common spider submitted from California as a brown recluse was in the genus Titiotus, whose bite is deemed harmless. A similar study documented that various arachnids were routinely misidentified by physicians, pest control operators, and other non-expert authorities, who told their patients or clients that the spider they had was a brown recluse when in fact it was not. Despite the absence of brown recluses from the Western U.S., physicians in the region commonly diagnose "brown recluse bites", leading to the popular misconception that the spiders inhabit those areas.

Over the last century, spiders have occasionally been intercepted in locations where they have no known established populations; these spiders may be transported fairly easily, though the lack of established populations well outside the natural range also indicates that such movement has not led to the colonization of new areas, after decades of opportunities. Note that the occurrence of brown recluses in a single building (such as a warehouse) outside of the native range is not considered as successful colonization; such single-building populations can occur (e.g., in several such cases in Florida), but do not spread, and can be easily eradicated. The spider has also received numerous sensationalized media reports of bites occurring where these spiders are absent (and no specimens were found), such as a 2014 report from Thailand, where a man was claimed to have died from a brown recluse bite. Many misidentifications and erroneous geographic records stem from the similarity between L. reclusa and a related introduced species, the Mediterranean recluse (Loxosceles rufescens), which is found worldwide, including numerous sightings throughout the United States; the two species are superficially almost indistinguishable, and misidentifications are common, making it difficult to distinguish which reports of recluses refer to which species.

== Life cycle ==
Adult brown recluse spiders often live about one to two years. Each female produces several egg sacs over a period of two to three months, from May to July, with approximately 50 eggs in each sac. The eggs hatch in about one month. The spiderlings take about one year to grow to adulthood. The brown recluse spider is resilient and can tolerate up to six months of extreme drought and scarcity or absence of food. On one occasion, a brown recluse survived in controlled captivity for over five seasons without any food at all.

As part of the haplogynae, brown recluses do not balloon, which limits their ability to widely disperse geographically. The brown recluse will, though not habitually, cannibalize another if food becomes scarce; especially during its typical mating season from June to September or when an unreceptive female encounters an aggressive male.

== Behavior ==
A brown recluse's stance on a flat surface is usually with all legs radially extended. When alarmed it may lower its body, withdraw the forward two legs straight rearward into a defensive position, withdraw the rearmost pair of legs into a position for lunging forward, and stand motionless with pedipalps raised. The pedipalps in mature specimens are dark and quite prominent and are normally held horizontally forward. When threatened it usually flees, seemingly to avoid a conflict, and if detained may further avoid contact with quick horizontal rotating movements or even resort to assuming a lifeless pose (playing dead). The spider does not usually jump unless touched brusquely, and even then its avoidance movement is more of a horizontal lunge rather than a vaulting of itself entirely off the surface. When running, the brown recluse does not leave a silk line behind, which would make it more easily tracked when it is being pursued. Movement at virtually any speed is an evenly paced gait with legs extended.

The brown recluse spider displays autotomy as a defense mechanism against physical, predatory attack to a leg as well as to prevent predatory, venom injections from spreading to the rest of the body. "Once a leg is lost, a recluse spider does not regenerate a new one with subsequent molts", unlike the huntsman spider, which does regenerate autotomized legs. With each time that a leg is autotomized, the recluse "changes its gait to compensate for the loss."

== Habitat ==
Brown recluse spiders build asymmetrical (irregular) webs that frequently include a shelter consisting of disorderly threads. They frequently build their webs in woodpiles and sheds, closets, garages, plenum spaces, cellars, and other places that are dry and generally undisturbed. When dwelling in human residences they seem to favor cardboard, possibly because it mimics the rotting tree bark which they inhabit naturally. Human-recluse contact often occurs when such isolated spaces are disturbed and the spider feels threatened. Unlike most web weavers, they leave these lairs at night to hunt. Males move around more when hunting than the females, which tend to remain nearer to their webs.

== Bite ==
Like all members of the Loxosceles genus, the brown recluse has potent tissue-destroying venoms containing the dermonecrotic agent sphingomyelinase D. Most bites are minor with no dermonecrosis, but a small number of brown recluse bites produce loxoscelism, a condition where the skin around the bite dies. While loxoscelism usually manifests as a skin condition (cutaneous loxoscelism), it can also include systemic symptoms like fever, nausea, and vomiting (viscerocutaneous loxoscelism). In very rare cases, bites can even cause hemolysis – the bursting of red blood cells. In one study of clinically diagnosed brown recluse bites, skin necrosis occurred 37% of the time, while systemic illness occurred 14% of the time.

As suggested by its specific name reclusa (recluse), the brown recluse spider is rarely aggressive, and bites from the species are uncommon. In 2001, more than 2,000 brown recluse spiders were removed from a heavily infested home in Kansas, yet the four residents who had lived there for years were never harmed by the spiders, despite many encounters with them. The spider usually bites only when pressed against the skin, such as when tangled within clothes, shoes, towels, bedding, or inside work gloves. Many human victims report having been bitten after putting on clothes or shoes that had not been worn recently or had been left for many days undisturbed on the floor. The fangs of the brown recluse are not large enough to penetrate most fabric.

When both types of loxoscelism do result, systemic effects may occur before necrosis, as the venom spreads throughout the body in minutes. Children, the elderly, and the debilitatingly ill may be more susceptible to systemic loxoscelism. The systemic symptoms most commonly experienced include nausea, vomiting, fever, rashes, and muscle and joint pain. Rarely, such bites can result in hemolysis, low platelet levels, blood clots throughout the body, organ damage, and even death. Most fatalities are in children under the age of seven or those with a weak immune system.

While the majority of brown recluse spider bites do not result in any symptoms, cutaneous symptoms occur more frequently than systemic symptoms. In such instances, the bite forms a necrotizing ulcer as the result of soft tissue destruction and may take months to heal, leaving deep scars. These bites usually become painful and itchy within 2–8 hours. Pain and other local effects worsen 12–36 hours after the bite, and the necrosis develops over the next few days. Over time, the wound may grow to as large as 25 cm (10 inches). The damaged tissue becomes gangrenous and eventually sloughs away. L. reclusa can produce slightly more than 0.1 μL of venom, though the average yield is less.

=== Misdiagnosis ===
There is an ELISA-based test for brown recluse venom that can determine whether a wound is a brown recluse bite, although it is not commercially available and not in routine clinical use. Clinical diagnoses often use Occam's razor principle in diagnosing bites based on what spiders the patient likely encountered and previous similar diagnoses.

Stoecker, Vetter & Dyer (2017) suggested the mnemonic "NOT RECLUSE", shown below, as a memory device to help laymen and medical professionals more objectively screen and diagnose potential cases of loxoscelism.

NOT RECLUSE mnemonic
Note that these are contrary criteria: Any one being true indicates that the injury is not a brown recluse bite.
| Numerous | More than one wound. |
| Occurrence | The injury did not occur in a place where brown recluses are likely to be found: Either outside of the spider's geographic territory ... or not in an enclosed space like a box, closet, or attic. |
| Timing | The wound arose sometime between November and March. |
| Red center | The center of the wound is red. |
| Elevated | The middle of the wound is elevated, not sunken. |
| Chronic | The wound has persisted for more than three months. |
| Large | The wound is more than 10 centimetres (4 inches) wide. |
| Ulcerates too early | The wound gets crusty within the first week. |
| Swollen | The wound swells up if it's below the neck. |
| Exudative | The wound is "wet" – oozing pus or clear fluid. |

There are numerous documented infectious and noninfectious conditions that produce wounds that have been initially misdiagnosed as recluse spider bites by medical professionals, including:

- Pyoderma gangrenosum
- Infection by Staphylococcus
- Infection by Streptococcus
- Herpes
- Diabetic ulcers
- Fungal infection
- Chemical burns
- Toxicodendron dermatitis
- Squamous cell carcinoma
- Localized vasculitis
- Syphilis
- Toxic epidermal necrolysis
- Sporotrichosis
- Lyme disease

Many of these conditions are far more common and more likely to be the source of necrotic wounds, even in areas where brown recluse spiders actually occur. The most important of these is methicillin-resistant Staphylococcus aureus (MRSA), a bacterium whose necrotic lesions are very similar to those induced by recluse bites, and which can be lethal if left untreated. Misdiagnosis of MRSA as spider bites is extremely common (nearly 30% of patients with MRSA reported that they initially suspected a spider bite), and can have fatal consequences.

Reported cases of brown recluse bites occur primarily in Arkansas, Colorado, Kansas, Missouri, Nebraska, Oklahoma, and Texas. There have been many reports of brown recluse bites in California – though a few related species of spiders may be found there, none of the related spiders in California is known to bite humans.

To date, the reports of bites from areas outside of the spider's native range have been either unverified or, if verified, the spiders have been moved to those locations by travelers or commerce.

==== Other spiders ====
For a comparison of the toxicity of several kinds of spider bites, see the list of medically significant spider bites

Many arachnologists believe that a large number of bites attributed to the brown recluse in the U.S. West Coast are either from other spider species or not spider bites at all. Other spiders in western states that might possibly cause necrotic injuries are the hobo spider, desert recluse spider, and the yellow sac spider.

For example, the venom of the hobo spider, a common European species now established in the northwestern United States and southern British Columbia, has been reported to produce similar symptoms as the brown recluse bite when injected into laboratory rabbits. However, the toxicity of hobo spider venom has been called into question: Actual bites (rather than syringe injections) have not been shown to cause necrosis, and no necrotic hobo spider bites have ever been reported where it is native.

Numerous other spiders have been associated with necrotic bites in the medical literature. Other recluse species, such as the desert recluse (found in the deserts of southwestern United States), are reported to have caused necrotic bite wounds, though only rarely. The hobo spider and the yellow sac spider have also been reported to cause necrotic bites. However, the bites from these spiders are not known to produce the severe symptoms that can follow from a recluse spider bite, and the level of danger posed by these has been called into question.

So far, no known necrotoxins have been isolated from the venom of any of these spiders, and some arachnologists have disputed the accuracy of spider identifications carried out by bite victims, family members, medical responders, and other non-experts in arachnology. There have been several studies questioning the danger posed by some of the other spiders mentioned: In these studies, scientists examined case studies of bites in which the spider in question was identified by an expert, and found that the incidence of necrotic injury diminished significantly when "questionable" identifications were excluded from the sample set.

=== Bite treatment ===
First aid involves the application of an ice pack to control inflammation and prompt medical care. If it can be easily captured, the spider should be brought with the patient in a clear, tightly closed container so it may be identified by an arachnologist; if there is no specimen at all, then confirmation by an expert is impossible.

Routine treatment should include immobilization of the affected limb, application of ice, local wound care, and tetanus prophylaxis. Many other therapies have been used with varying degrees of success, including hyperbaric oxygen, dapsone, antihistamines (e.g., cyproheptadine), antibiotics, dextran, glucocorticoids, vasodilators, heparin, nitroglycerin, electric shock, curettage, surgical excision, and antivenom. In almost all cases, bites are self-limited and typically heal without any medical intervention.

Outpatient palliative care following discharge often consists of a weak or moderate strength opioid (e.g. codeine or tramadol, respectively) depending on pain scores, an anti-inflammatory agent (e.g. naproxen, cortisone), and an antispasmodic (e.g. cyclobenzaprine, diazepam), for a few days to a week. If the pain or spasms have not resolved by this time, a second medical evaluation is generally advised, and differential diagnoses may be considered.

==== Specific treatments ====
In presumed cases of recluse bites, dapsone is often used for the treatment of necrosis, but controlled clinical trials have yet to demonstrate efficacy. However, dapsone may be effective in treating many "spider bites" because many such cases are actually misdiagnosed microbial infections. There have been conflicting reports about its efficacy in treating brown recluse bites, and some have suggested it should no longer be used routinely, if at all.

Wound infection is rare. Antibiotics are not recommended unless there is a credible diagnosis of infection.

Studies have shown that surgical intervention is ineffective and may worsen outcomes. Excision may delay wound healing, cause abscesses, and lead to scarring.

Purportedly application of nitroglycerin stopped necrosis. However, one scientific animal study found no benefit in preventing necrosis, with the study's results showing it increased inflammation and caused symptoms of systemic envenoming. The authors concluded the results of the study did not support the use of topical nitroglycerin in brown recluse envenoming.

Antivenom is available in South America for the venom of related species of recluse spiders. However, the bites, often being painless, usually do not present symptoms until 24 or more hours after the event, possibly limiting the effect of this intervention.

==== Spider population control ====
Due to increased fear of these spiders prompted by greater public awareness of their presence in recent years, the extermination of domestic brown recluses is performed frequently in the lower midwestern United States. Brown recluse spiders possess a variety of adaptive abilities, including the ability to survive up to 10 months with no food or water. Additionally, these spiders survive significantly longer in a relatively cool, thermally stable environment.
