= Phospholipase D toxins =

Venom agent, mostly in recluse spiders

Sphingomyelin phosphodiesterase D

Identifiers
- EC no.: 3.1.4.41
- CAS no.: 54992-31-3

Databases
- BRENDA: enzyme data
- ExPASy: NiceZyme view
- KEGG: enzyme entry
- MetaCyc: metabolic pathway
- Rhea: reactions
- PDB structures: RCSB PDB PDBe PDBsum
Search
- PMC: articles
- PubMed: articles
- NCBI: proteins

Overview of PLD toxin action at the cell surface. Protein is colored from N- (blue) to C-terminus (red).

Phospholipase D toxins (PLD) are protein enzymes found in recluse spider venom, most infamously the brown recluse (Loxosceles reclusa), as well as certain types of bacteria. Sicariid PLDs are sometimes called SicTox. Bacterial homologs are called sphingomyelin phosphodiesterase D. The term PLD broadly refers to a family of enzymes that are the primary active toxins in the venoms of recluse spiders (genus Loxosceles). PLD toxins function molecularly by chemically modifying certain types of lipids in cell membranes, forming lipids containing ring-structures called cyclic phospholipid products, which are thought to disrupt cell surfaces. Physiological symptoms of envenomation can result in the formation of dermonecrotic lesions, hemolysis, and a systemic syndrome called loxoscelism. Closely-related enzymes are also expressed in tick saliva, and are pathogenicity factors in certain pathogenic bacteria and fungi.

Sphingomyelin phosphodiesterase D activity is shared by enzymes with a wider substrate range, classified as phospholipases D or lipophosphodiesterase II EC 3.1.4.4. They should not be confused with the family of human sphingomyelinase D/phospholipase D enzymes, which are structurally and evolutionarily unrelated and catalyze hydrolysis rather than transphosphatidylation.

== Structure ==
PLD toxins are around 31 kDa in size and consist of alternating beta sheets and alpha helices in a circle that overall form a hollow cylindrical structure called a beta barrel. One side of the opening to the beta barrel forms the active site that engages with lipids in cell membranes. Disordered loops around the active site have been shown in computer simulations to dip into the membrane, to hold on, as the enzyme binds to the surface. The structures of four members of the PLD toxin family have been solved via protein X-ray crystallography, including PLDs from Loxosceles intermedia, Loxosceles laeta, Sicarius terrosus, and the bacterium Arcanobacterium haemolyticum. Structures of the PLD toxin from Sicarius terrosus were solved in 2026 at high resolution with lipid substrate and cyclic lipid product bound.

The four main substrates targeted by recluse PLD toxins

== Substrates and molecular mechanism ==
PLD toxins catalyse a chemical reaction called transphosphatidylation, which involves the formation of a bond between part of the lipid carbon chain and the phosphorus in the lipid head group; this reaction forms lipids with either hexagonal or pentagonal ring structures, called cyclic phosphate products. PLD toxins were originally called sphingomyelinase D (SMaseD) toxins because the original characterization showed activity against sphingomyelin. However, after the discovery that PLD toxins could also catalyze the cyclization of other types of lipids, including certain lysophospholipids including lysophosphatidylcholine, the enzyme was renamed phospholipase D (PLD) to more accurately reflect its target profile. Targets include both sphingolipids and lysophospholipids containing a hydroxyl (OH) group on the lipid backbone, which is what forms the chemical bond to the phosphate, and that have a positive or neutral head group recognized by the PLD, including sphingomyelin (SM), lysophosphatidylcholine (LysoPC), ceramide phosphoethanolamine (CPE), and lysophosphatidylethanolamine (LPE). Enzyme activity is magnesium dependent, with the target lipid coordinated in the active site by a covalently bound Mg^{2+} ion.

The cyclisation reaction catalysed by PLD/SMaseD to form a cyclic phosphate from the two primary substrates.

The enzyme catalyzes cyclization by deprotonation of the hydroxyl (OH) nucleophile via an active site catalytic histidine. The substrate hydroxyl then nucleophilically attacks at the phosphorus center, resulting in loss of the (typically choline or ethanolamine) head group, which is protonated by a second histidine. The resulting molecule is either cyclic ceramide phosphate (CCP) from SM or CPE, or cyclic phosphatidic acid (CPA) from LPC or LPE. CCP has been poorly characterized, but it is thought to be resistant to hydrolysis in vivo and there is one structure solved bound to enzyme, showing how the molecule is oriented in the active site of the enzyme.

=== Cyclic product ===
SMaseD/PLD was originally proposed to catalyze the cleavage (hydrolysis) of substrates sphingomyelin and lysophosphatidylcholine to form the linear products ceramide-1-phosphate (C1P) or lysophosphatidic acid (LPA), respectively, which is the mechanism catalysed by unrelated mammalian SMaseD and PLD enzymes. However, in 2013, experiments measuring the reaction by 31-phosphorus (^{31}P) NMR, which enables characterization of chemical bonds to the phosphorus atom, showed that the product was a novel cyclic lipid: 6 ceramide-1,3-cyclic phosphate (N-hexanoyl-ceramide-1,3-cyclic-phosphate; CCP) from SM, and cyclic phosphatidic acid (1-acyl-sn-glycerol-2, 3-cyclic phosphate; CPA) from LPC. In 2026, the cyclic product was crystallized in the active site for the first time, further confirming the mechanism and cyclic product. Despite clear NMR and direct structural evidence, acceptance of the cyclic product has been contentious and the linear product C1P has been erroneously claimed in multiple papers.

== In bacteria ==
Corynebacterium pseudotuberculosis, which causes lesions in ruminants, was the first bacteria in which sphingomyelin phosphodiesterase D was isolated.

== Toxicity ==
All Sicariid spiders express at least three different groups of genes, for a total of around twenty various enzyme paralogues of PLD toxins present in each venom. The alpha-clade members of the family are generally toxic to mammalian cells, because they target substrate with choline head groups. In contrast, the beta-clade SMaseD/PLD members are neurotoxic to insects, because they target substrate with ethanolamine head groups, consistent with a role in prey immobilization and capture.

=== Cellular mechanism ===
The cellular mechanism of PLD toxicity is still highly contested. It has been shown that addition of PLD/SMaseD to liposomes causes membrane remodelling as seen by fluorescent microscopy.

== Targeted therapies ==
Polyclonal antivenom is available in some countries for the treatment of loxoscelism. However, most therapies involve supportive care such as elevation and immobilization of the affected area, hypobaric oxygen, dapsone, glucocorticoids, and antihistamines. No small-molecule targeted inhibitors currently exist for PLD/SMaseD toxins, although several have been investigated.

== Evolution ==
The mechanism described for recluse PLD toxins is believed to be the reverse of that for the ancient ancestral enzyme glycerophosphodiesterases. Thus, these enzymes have also been referred to as glycerophosphodiester phosphodiesterase-like sphingomyelinase D/phospholipase D (GDPD-like SMaseD/PLD). The gene encoding the PLD toxin is thought to have been horizontally transferred from bacteria into spiders, followed by recruitment into the venom gland.
