= The Redback on the Toilet Seat (disambiguation) =

The Redback on the Toilet Seat may refer to:

- The Redback on the Toilet Seat, a 1972 country music EP by Slim Newton
- The Redback on the Toilet Seat (album), a 1972 country music LP by Slim Newton
- "The Redback on the Toilet Seat", an award winning country music song by Slim Newton recorded in 1971

== See also ==
- Redback on the Toilet Seat, a 2008 book of Slim Newton's lyrics illustrated by Craig Smith
