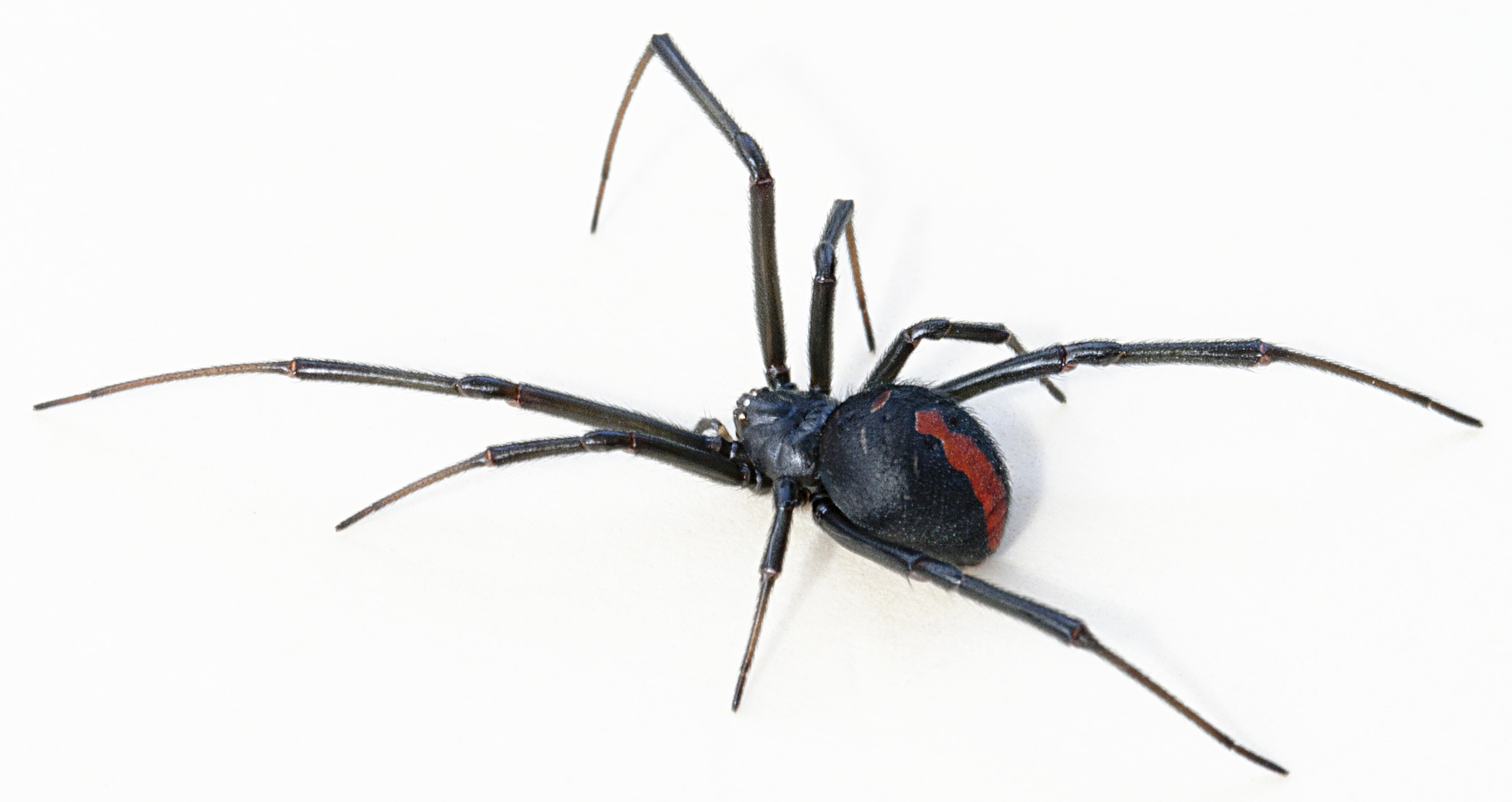
- Adult female red back spider
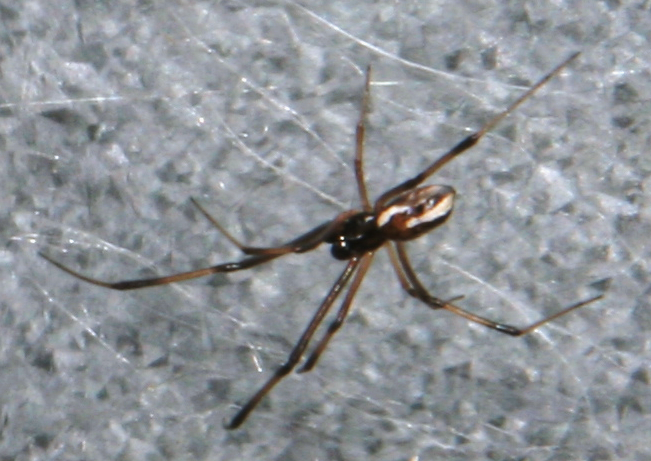
- Adult male (considerably smaller than female)

Scientific classification
- Kingdom: Animalia
- Phylum: Arthropoda
- Subphylum: Chelicerata
- Class: Arachnida
- Order: Araneae
- Infraorder: Araneomorphae
- Family: Theridiidae
- Genus: Latrodectus
- Species: L. hasselti

Binomial name
- Latrodectus hasselti Thorell, 1870

Synonyms
- Latrodectus hasseltii Thorell, 1870; Latrodectus scelio Thorell, 1870; Latrodectus scelio indicus Simon, 1897; Latrodectus indicus Pocock, 1900; Latrodectus hasselti indicus Pickard-Cambridge, 1902; Latrodectus ancorifer Dahl, 1902; Latrodectus hasselti aruensis Strand, 1911; Latrodectus hasselti ancorifer Kulczyński, 1911; Latrodectus cinctus [rejected] Gerschman & Schiapelli, 1942; Latrodectus mactans hasselti Chrysanthus, 1975

= Redback spider =

Species of spider

The redback spider (Latrodectus hasselti), also known as the Australian black widow, is a species of highly venomous spider believed to originate in Australia, but which is now found in Southeast Asia, Japan and New Zealand. It has also been found in packing crates in the United States with colonies elsewhere outside Australia. It is a member of the cosmopolitan genus Latrodectus, the widow spiders. The adult female is easily recognised by her spherical black body with a prominent red stripe on the upper side of her abdomen and an hourglass-shaped red/orange streak on the underside. Females usually have a body length of about 10 millimetres (0.4 in), while the male is much smaller, being only 3–4 mm (0.12–0.16 in) long.

Mainly nocturnal, the female redback lives in an untidy web in a warm sheltered location, commonly near or inside human residences. It preys on insects, spiders and small vertebrates that become ensnared in its web. It kills its prey by injecting a complex venom through its two fangs when it bites, before wrapping them in silk and sucking out the liquefied insides. Often, it first squirts its victim with what resembles 'superglue' from its spinnerets, immobilising the prey by sticking the victim's limbs and appendages to its own body. The redback spider then trusses the victim with silk. Once its prey is restrained, it is bitten repeatedly on the head, body and leg segments and is then hauled back to the redback spider's retreat. Sometimes a potentially dangerous victim can be left to struggle for hours until it is exhausted enough to approach safely. Male spiders and spiderlings often live on the periphery of the female spiders' web and steal leftovers. Other species of spider and parasitoid wasps prey on this species. The redback is one of a number of arachnids that usually display sexual cannibalism while mating.

After mating, sperm is stored in the spermathecae, organs of the female reproductive tract, and can be used up to two years later to fertilise several clutches of eggs. Each clutch averages 250 eggs and is housed in a round white silken egg sac. The redback spider has a widespread distribution in Australia, and inadvertent introductions have led to established colonies in New Zealand, the United Arab Emirates, and Japan.

The redback is one of the few spider species that can be seriously harmful to humans, and its liking for habitats in built structures has led it to being responsible for a large number of serious spider bites in Australia. Predominantly neurotoxic to vertebrates, the venom gives rise to the syndrome of latrodectism in humans; this starts with pain around the bite site, which typically becomes severe and progresses up the bitten limb and persists for over 24 hours. Sweating in localised patches of skin occasionally occurs and is highly indicative of latrodectism. Generalised symptoms of nausea, vomiting, headache, and agitation may also occur and indicate severe envenomation. An antivenom has been available since 1956.

== Taxonomy and naming ==
=== Common names ===
The common name "redback" is derived from the distinctive red stripe along the dorsal aspect of its abdomen. Other common names include red-striped spider, red-spot spider, jockey spider, Murra-ngura spider, Kapara spider and the Kanna-jeri spider.

=== History ===
Before DNA analysis, the taxonomy of the widow spider genus Latrodectus had been unclear—changes in the number of species reflect the difficulty of using morphology to determine subdivisions within the genus. Substantial interest in their systematics was most likely prompted by the medical importance of these venomous spiders. Swedish arachnologist Tamerlan Thorell described the redback spider in 1870 from specimens collected in Rockhampton and Bowen in central Queensland. He named it Latrodectus hasseltii in honour of colleague A.W.M. van Hasselt. In the same paper, he named a female from Cape York with an all-black abdomen L. scelio, now regarded as the same species. These specimens are in the Naturhistoriska Riksmuseet in Stockholm. Between 1872 and 1972, all subsequent authors spelled the species name as hasselti, and that altered spelling is maintained today.

German arachnologist Friedrich Dahl revised the genus in 1902 and named L. ancorifer from New Guinea, which was later regarded as a subspecies of the redback. Another subspecies, L. h. aruensis, was described by Norwegian entomologist Embrik Strand in 1911. Subspecies indica (of L. scelio) had been described by Eugène Simon in 1897, but its origin is unclear. Frederick Octavius Pickard-Cambridge questioned Dahl's separating species on what he considered minor anatomical details but Dahl dismissed Pickard-Cambridge as an "ignoramus". Pickard-Cambridge was unsure whether L. hasselti warranted species status, though he confirmed scelio and hasselti as a single species, other researchers such as Ludwig Carl Christian Koch noting the differences to be inconsistent. The redback was also considered by some to be conspecific with the katipō (L. katipo), which is native to New Zealand, though Koch regarded them as distinct.

Reviewing the genus Latrodectus in 1959, arachnologist Herbert Walter Levi concluded that the colour variations were largely continuous across the world and were not suitable for distinguishing the individual species. Instead, he focused on differences in the morphology of the female sexual organs, and revised the number of recognised species from 22 to 6. This included reclassifying the redback and several other species as subspecies of the best-known member of the group, the black widow spider (Latrodectus mactans), found in North America and other regions. He did not consider the subspecies L. h. ancorifer, L. h. aruensis and L. h. indicus distinct enough to warrant recognition. Subsequently, more reliable genetic studies have split the genus into about 30 species, and the redback has no recognised subspecies in modern classifications.

=== Placement ===
A member of the genus Latrodectus in the family Theridiidae, the redback belongs in a clade with the black widow spider, with the katipō as its closest relative. A 2004 molecular study supports the redback's status as a distinct species, as does the unique abdomen-presenting behaviour of the male during mating. The close relationship between the two species is shown when mating: the male redback is able to successfully mate with a female katipō producing hybrid offspring. However, the male katipō is too heavy to mate with the female redback, as it triggers a predatory response in the female when it approaches the web, causing the female to eat it. There is evidence of interbreeding between female katipō and male redbacks in the wild.

== Description ==
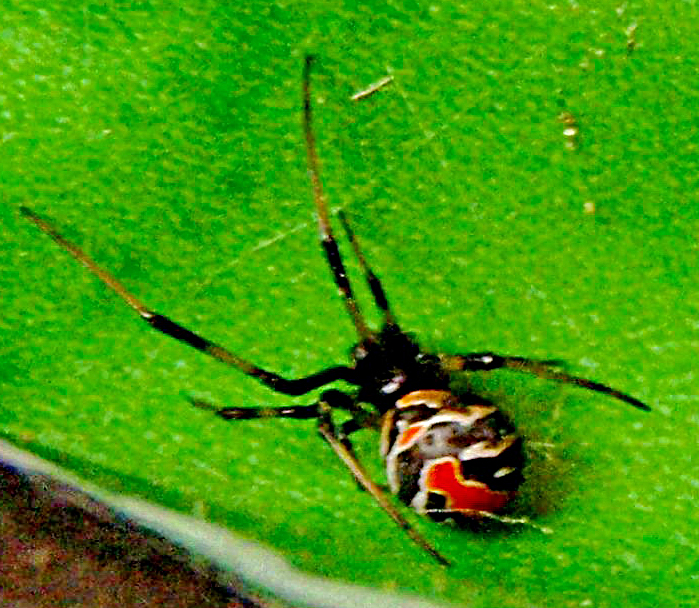
A juvenile female, showing typical white banding

The adult female redback has a body around 1 centimetre (0.4 in) long, with slender legs, the first pair of which are longer than the rest. The round abdomen is a deep black (occasionally brownish), with a red (sometimes orange) longitudinal stripe on the upper surface and an hourglass-shaped scarlet streak on the underside. Females with incomplete markings or all-black abdomens occasionally occur. The cephalothorax is much smaller than the abdomen, and is black. Redback spiderlings are grey with dark spots, and become darker with each moult. Juvenile females have additional white markings on the abdomen. The bright scarlet red colours may serve as a warning to potential predators. Each spider has a pair of venom glands, one attached to each of its chelicerae with very small fangs. Small compared to the female, the male redback is 3–4 mm (0.12–0.16 in) long and is light brown, with white markings on the upper side of the abdomen and a pale hourglass marking on the underside.

Another species in Australia with a similar physique, Steatoda capensis, has been termed the "false redback spider", but it is uniformly black (or plum), and does not display the red stripe.

== Behaviour ==
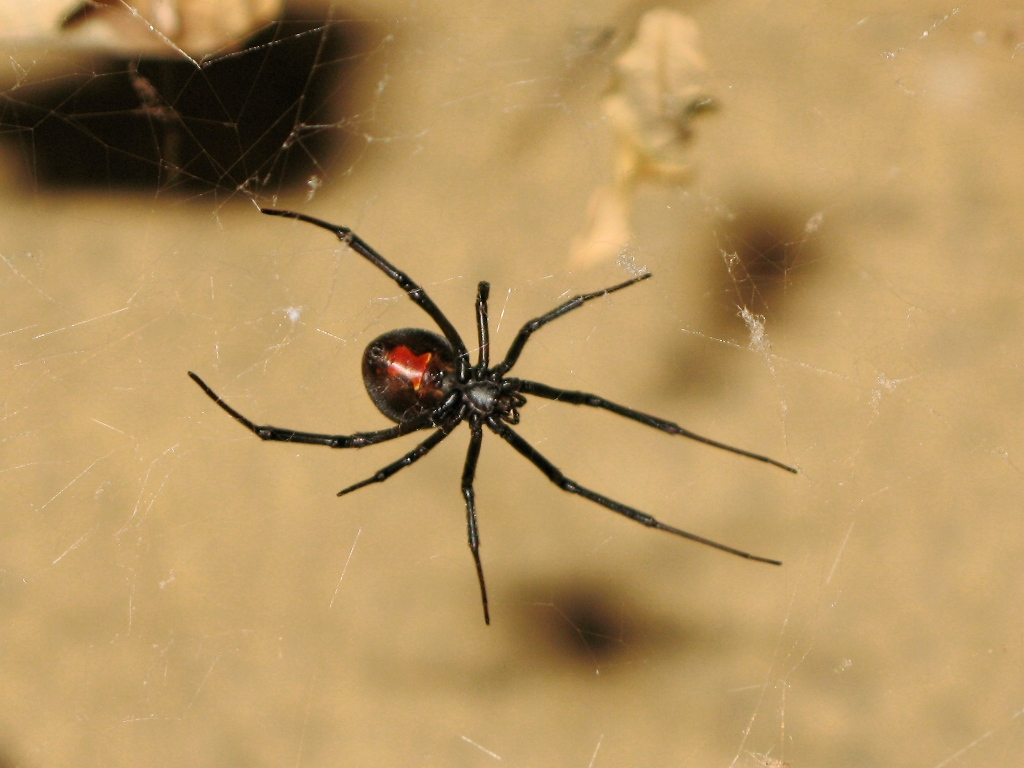
Female in its web

=== Web ===
The redback is mainly nocturnal; the female remains concealed during the day, and spins her web during the night, usually remaining in the same location for most of her adult life. Classified as a gum-footed tangle web, the web is an irregular-looking tangle of fine but strong silk. Although the threads seem random, they are strategically placed for support and entrapment of prey. The rear portion of the web forms a funnel-like retreat area where the spider and egg sacs are found. This area has vertical, sticky catching threads that run to ground attachments. The vertical strands act as trip wires to initially alert the spider to the presence of prey or threats. They also snare and haul prey into the air when weaker horizontal strands that hold them down, known as guy lines, break when prey thrash around. These webs are usually placed between two flat surfaces, one beneath the other. The female spends more time in the funnel and less time moving around during cooler weather. The individual web filaments are quite strong, able to entangle and hold small reptiles.

=== Prey ===
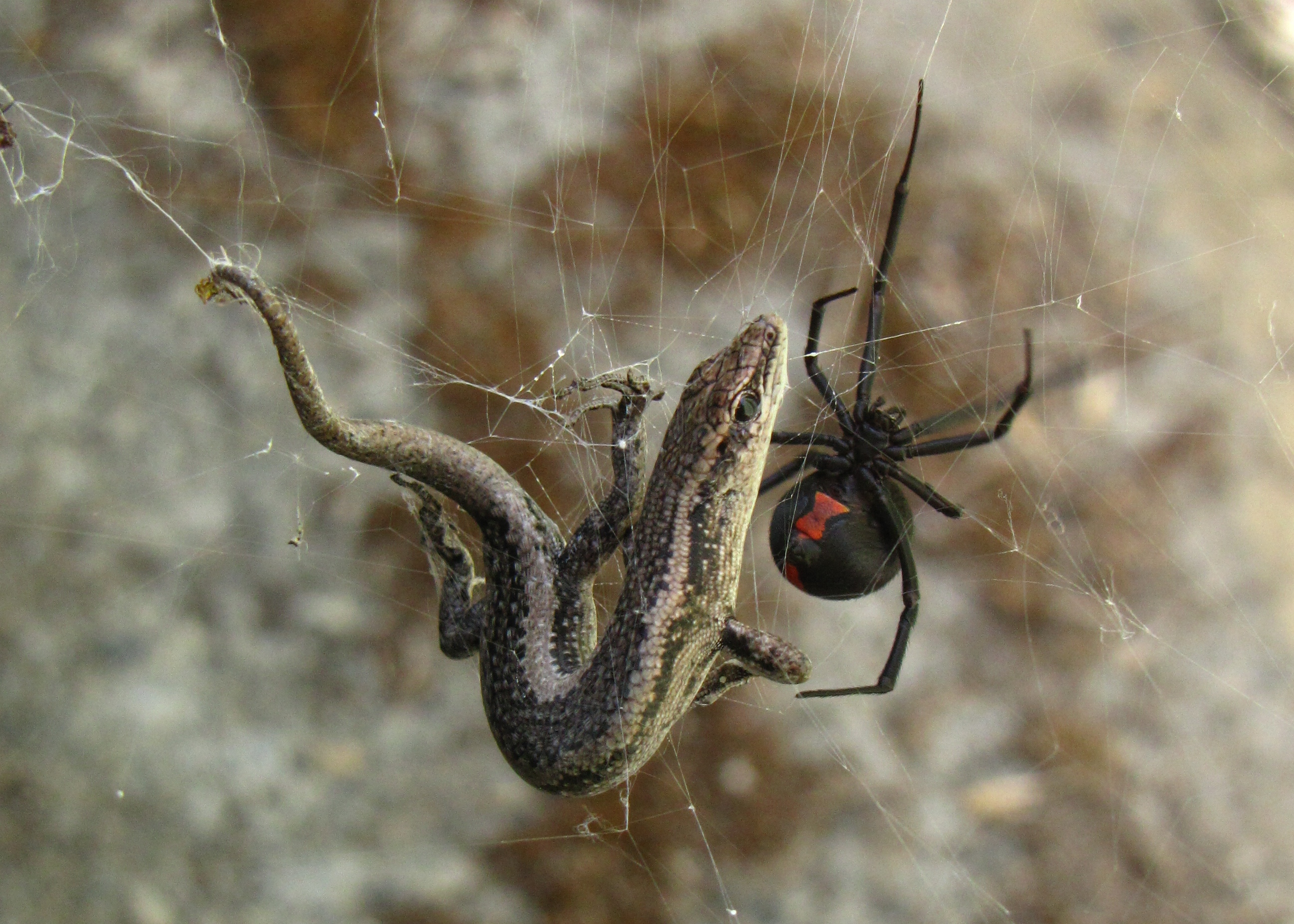
Female with a lizard it has captured

Redbacks usually prey on insects, but can capture larger animals that become entangled in the web, including trapdoor spiders, small lizards, and even on rare occasion snakes. One web was recorded as containing a dead mouse. The woodlouse (Porcellio scaber) is a particularly common food item. Developing spiderlings need size-appropriate prey, and laboratory studies show that they are willing to consume common fruit flies (Drosophila melanogaster), mealworm larvae (Tenebrio molitor), muscoid flies and early nymphs of cockroaches. Food scraps and lighting attract insect prey to areas of human activity, which brings the redbacks. Once alerted to a creature becoming ensnared in a trap line, the redback advances to around a leg's length from its target, touching it and squirting a liquid glutinous silk over it to immobilise it. It then bites its victim repeatedly on the head, body and leg joints and wraps it in sticky and dry silk. Unlike other spiders, it does not rotate its prey while wrapping in silk, but like other spiders, it then injects a venom that liquefies its victim's innards. Once it has trussed the prey, the redback takes it to its retreat and begins sucking out the liquefied insides, generally 5 to 20 minutes after first attacking it. Redback spiders do not usually drink, except when starved.

Commonly, prey-stealing occurs where larger females take food items stored in other spiders' webs. When they encounter other spiders of the same species, often including those of the opposite sex, they engage in battle, and the defeated spider is eaten. If a male redback is accepted by a female, it is permitted to feed on the victims snared in the female's web. Baby spiders also steal food from their mother, which she tries to prevent. They also consume sticky silk as well as small midges and flies. Spiderlings are cannibalistic, more active ones sometimes eating their less active siblings.

=== Life cycle ===
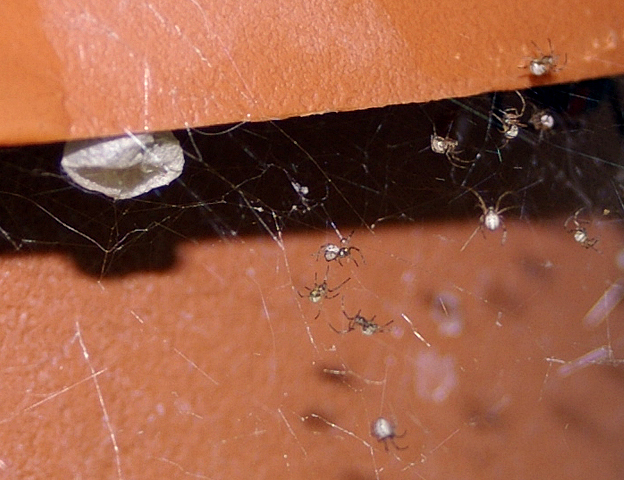
Redback spiderlings

Spiderlings hatch from their eggs after about 8 days and can emerge from the egg sac as early as 11 days after being laid, although cooler temperatures can significantly slow their development so that emergence does not occur for months. After hatching they spend about a week inside the egg sac, feeding on the yolk and molting once. Baby spiders appear from September to January (spring to early summer). Male spiders mature through five instars in about 45–90 days. Females mature through seven–eight instars in about 75–120 days. Males live for up to six or seven months, while females may live between two and three years. Laboratory tests have shown that redbacks may survive for an average of 100 days, and sometimes over 300 days without any food, those starved at 10 °C (50 °F) faring better than those kept without food at 25 °C (77 °F). Spiders are known to reduce their metabolic rates in response to starvation, and can distend their abdomens to store large amounts of food. Redbacks can survive temperatures from below freezing point to 40 °C (104 °F), though they do need relatively warm summers, with temperatures of 15 to 25 °C (59 to 77 °F) for two to three months, to survive and breed.

Redback spiderlings cohabit on the maternal web for several days to a week, during which time sibling cannibalism is often observed. They then leave by being carried on the wind. They follow light and climb to the top of nearby logs or rocks before extending their abdomens high in the air and producing a droplet of silk. The liquid silk is drawn out into a long gossamer thread that, when long enough, carries the spider away. This behaviour is known as ballooning or kiting. Eventually, the silken thread will adhere to an object where the young spider will establish its own web. They sometimes work cooperatively, climbing, releasing silk and being carried off in clusters. Juvenile spiders build webs, sometimes with other spiders.

=== Reproduction ===
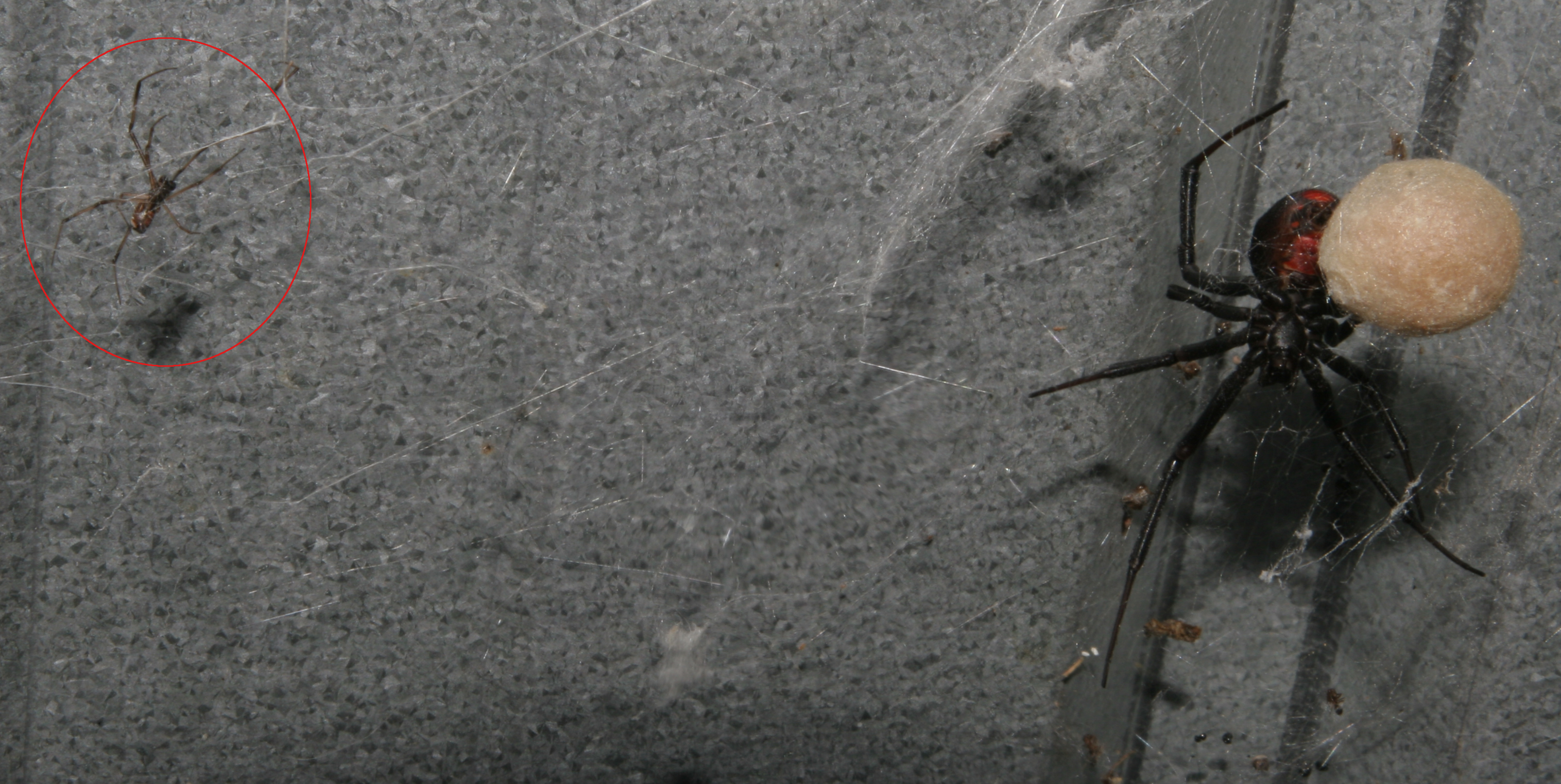
Female (right) with egg sac, note the male at left (circled)

Before a juvenile male leaves its mother's web, it builds a small sperm web on which it deposits its sperm from its gonads and then collects it back into each of its two palps (copulatory organs), because the gonads and palps are not internally connected. After it moults into its last instar, it sets off wandering to seek a female. The male spider does not eat during this period. How males find females is unclear, and it is possible they may balloon like juveniles. A Western Australian field study found that most males took 6 to 8 weeks to travel around 3 to 3.5 metres (9.8 to 11.5 ft) with occasional journeys of over 8 m (26 ft), but that only around 11–13% successfully found a mate. They are attracted by pheromones, which are secreted by unmated sexually mature female redback spiders onto their webs and include a serine derivative (N-3-methylbutyryl-O-(S)-2-methylbutyryl-L-serine). This is thought to be the sole method by which males assess a female's reproductive status, and their courtship dismantles much of the pheremone-marked web.

During mating, the male redback attempts to copulate by inserting one of its palps into one of the female's two spermathecae, each of which has its own insemination orifice. It then tries and often succeeds in inserting the other palp into the female's second orifice. The redback spider is one of only two animals known where the male has been found to actively assist the female in sexual cannibalism. In the process of mating, the much smaller male somersaults to place his abdomen over the female's mouthparts. In about two of three cases, the female fully consumes the male while mating continues. Males which are not eaten die of their injuries soon after mating. Sacrifice during mating is thought to confer two advantages to the species. The first is the eating process allows for a longer period of copulation and thus fertilisation of more eggs. The second is females which have eaten a male are more likely to reject subsequent males. Although this prohibits future mating for the males, this is not a serious disadvantage, because the spiders are sufficiently sparse that less than 20% of males ever find a potential mate during their lifetimes, and in any case, the male is functionally sterile if he has used the contents of both of his palps in the first mating.

Some redback males have been observed using an alternative tactic that also ensures more of their genetic material is passed on. Juvenile female redbacks nearing their final moulting and adulthood have fully formed reproductive organs, but lack openings in the exoskeleton that allow access to the organs. Males will bite through the exoskeleton and deliver sperm without performing the somersault seen in males mating with adult females. The females then moult within a few days and deliver a clutch of fertilised eggs.

Once the female has mated, the sperm is stored in one or both of her spermathecae. The sperm can be used to fertilise several batches of eggs, over a period of up to two years (estimated from observations of closely related species), but typically restarts the female's pheromone production advertising her sexual availability about three months after mating. A female spider may lay four to ten egg sacs, each of which is around 1 cm (0.39 in) in diameter and contains on average around 250 eggs, though can be as few as 40 or as many as 500. She prepares a shallow concave disc around 3 mm (1/8 in) in diameter before laying eggs into it over a period of around five minutes before laying more silk to complete the sac, which becomes spherical, the whole process taking around one and a quarter hours. She can produce a new egg sac as early as one to three weeks after her last.

== Distribution and habitat ==
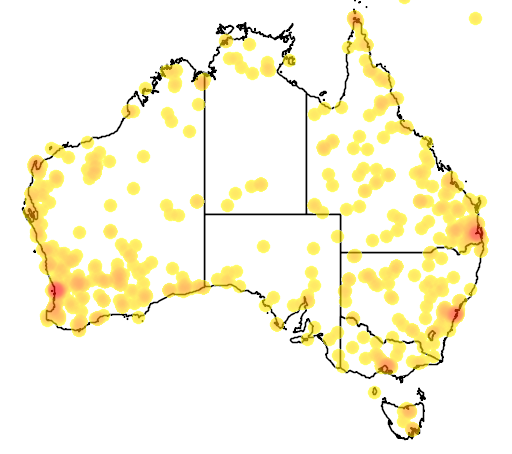
A distribution map of the records of redback spider specimens reported to the Atlas of Living Australia as of September 2013

The redback spider is widespread across Australia. The current distribution reported by the World Spider Catalogue includes Southeast Asia and New Zealand. Colonies and individuals have been found elsewhere, including Japan, England, Belgium, the United Arab Emirates and Iran. It was believed at one time that the redback may have been introduced to Australia, because when it was first formally described in 1870, it appeared to be concentrated around sea ports. However, an earlier informal description (1850) from the Adelaide Hills is now known, and names in Australian Aboriginal languages also show that it was present well before European settlement. Its original range is thought to be a relatively small arid part of South Australia and Western Australia. Its spread has been inadvertently aided by modern buildings, which often provide habitats conducive to redback populations. The close relationship between the redback and the New Zealand katipō also supports the native status of both in their respective countries.

Outside urban areas, the redback is more often found in drier habitats ranging from sclerophyll forest to desert, even as harsh as the Simpson Desert. It became much more common in urban areas in the early decades of the 20th century, and is now found in all but the most inhospitable environments in Australia and its cities. It is particularly common in Brisbane, Perth and Alice Springs. It is wide spread throughout urban Australia, with most suburban backyards in the city of Canberra (for instance) having one or more nesting females in such places as firewood piles, stored brick stacks and around unused or restoring motor vehicles as well as generally behind the shed - as observed since at least the 1970s and probably earlier. The redback spider is commonly found in close proximity to human residences. Webs are usually built in dry, dark, sheltered sites, such as among rocks, in logs, tree hollows, shrubs, old tyres, sheds, outhouses, empty tins and boxes, children's toys or under rubbish or litter. Letterboxes and the undersurface of toilet seats are common sites. Populations can be controlled by clearing these habitats, squashing the spiders and their egg sacs, and using pesticide in outhouses. The CSIRO Division of Entomology recommends against the use of spider pesticides due to their toxicity, and because redbacks are rapid recolonists anyway.

Spiders in the French territory of New Caledonia in the Pacific were identified as L. hasselti in 1920, based on morphology. Their behaviour differs from Australian redbacks, as they do not engage in sexual cannibalism and are less prone to biting humans. The first recorded envenomation in New Caledonia was in 2007.

=== Introductions ===
The redback spider's affinity for human-modified habitat has enabled it to spread to several countries via international shipping and trade. Furthermore, its tolerance to cold means that it has the ability to colonise many temperate countries with a winter climate cooler than Australia. This is concerning due to the risks to people being bitten who are unaware of its venomous nature, and also to the conservation of local threatened insect species that the redback might prey upon.

Redback spiders are also found in small colonies in areas of New Zealand. They are frequently intercepted by quarantine authorities, often among steel or car shipments. They were introduced into New Zealand in the early 1980s, and now are found around Central Otago (including Alexandra, Bannockburn and near Wānaka) in the South Island and New Plymouth in the North Island. Authorities in the United Arab Emirates warn residents and visitors of redback spiders, which have been present since 1990. Colonies have also been established in greenhouses in Belgium, and isolated observations indicate possible presence in New Guinea, the Philippines, and India. Some redbacks were found in Preston, Lancashire, England, after a container of parts arrived from Australia; some may have escaped into the countryside before pest controllers could destroy them. One redback was found in a back garden in Dartford in Kent. Two females were discovered in the Iranian port city of Bandar Abbas in 2010.

There is an established population of redback spiders in Osaka, Japan, thought to have arrived in cargoes of wood chips. In 2008, redback spiders were found in Fukuoka, Japan. Over 700 have been found near the container terminal in Hakata Bay, Fukuoka City. Dispersal mechanisms within Japan are unclear, but redbacks are thought to have spread by walking or by being carried on vehicles. In September 2012, after being bitten a woman was hospitalised in the Higashi Ward of Fukuoka City. Signs warning about redback spiders have been posted in parks around the city.

== Predators and parasitoids ==
The black house spider (Badumna insignis), the cellar spider (Pholcus phalangioides) and the giant daddy-long-legs spider (Artema atlanta) are known to prey on the redback spider, and redbacks are often absent if these species are present in significant numbers. Agenioideus nigricornis, a spider wasp, is a parasitoid of the adult redback. Other wasps of the families Eurytomidae and Ichneumonidae parasitise redback eggs, and mantid lacewings (Mantispidae) prey on redback eggs.

== Bites to humans ==
=== Incidence ===
The redback spider has been historically responsible for more envenomations requiring antivenom than any other creature in Australia. However, by 2017 the spider was blamed for only 250 envenomations requiring antivenom annually. Estimates of the number of people thought to be bitten by redback spiders each year across Australia range from 2,000 to 10,000. The larger female spider is responsible for almost all cases of redback spider bites. The smaller male was thought to be unable to envenomate a human, although some cases have been reported; their rarity is probably due to the male's smaller size and proportionally smaller fangs, rather than its being incapable of biting or lacking potent venom. The bite from both juvenile and mature females appears to have similar potency. The male bite usually only produces short-lived, mild pain. Most bites occur in the warmer months between December and April, in the afternoon or evening. As the female redback is slow-moving and rarely leaves her web, bites generally occur as a result of placing a hand or other body part too close to the spider, such as when reaching into dark holes or wall cavities. Bites often also occur when a hidden spider is disturbed in items such as clothes, shoes, gloves, building materials, garden tools or children's outdoor toys.

A 2004 review reported 46% of bites occurring on distal extremities of the limbs, 25% on proximal areas of limbs (upper arms and thighs), 21% on the trunk, and 7% on the head or neck. In some cases the same spider bites a victim multiple times. Historically, victims were often bitten on the genitalia, though this phenomenon disappeared as outhouses were superseded by plumbed indoor toilets. Conversely, bites on the head and neck have increased with use of safety helmets and ear muffs. Precautions to avoid being bitten include wearing gloves and shoes while gardening, not leaving clothes on the floor, and shaking out gloves or shoes before putting them on. Also, children can be educated not to touch spiders.

=== Venom ===
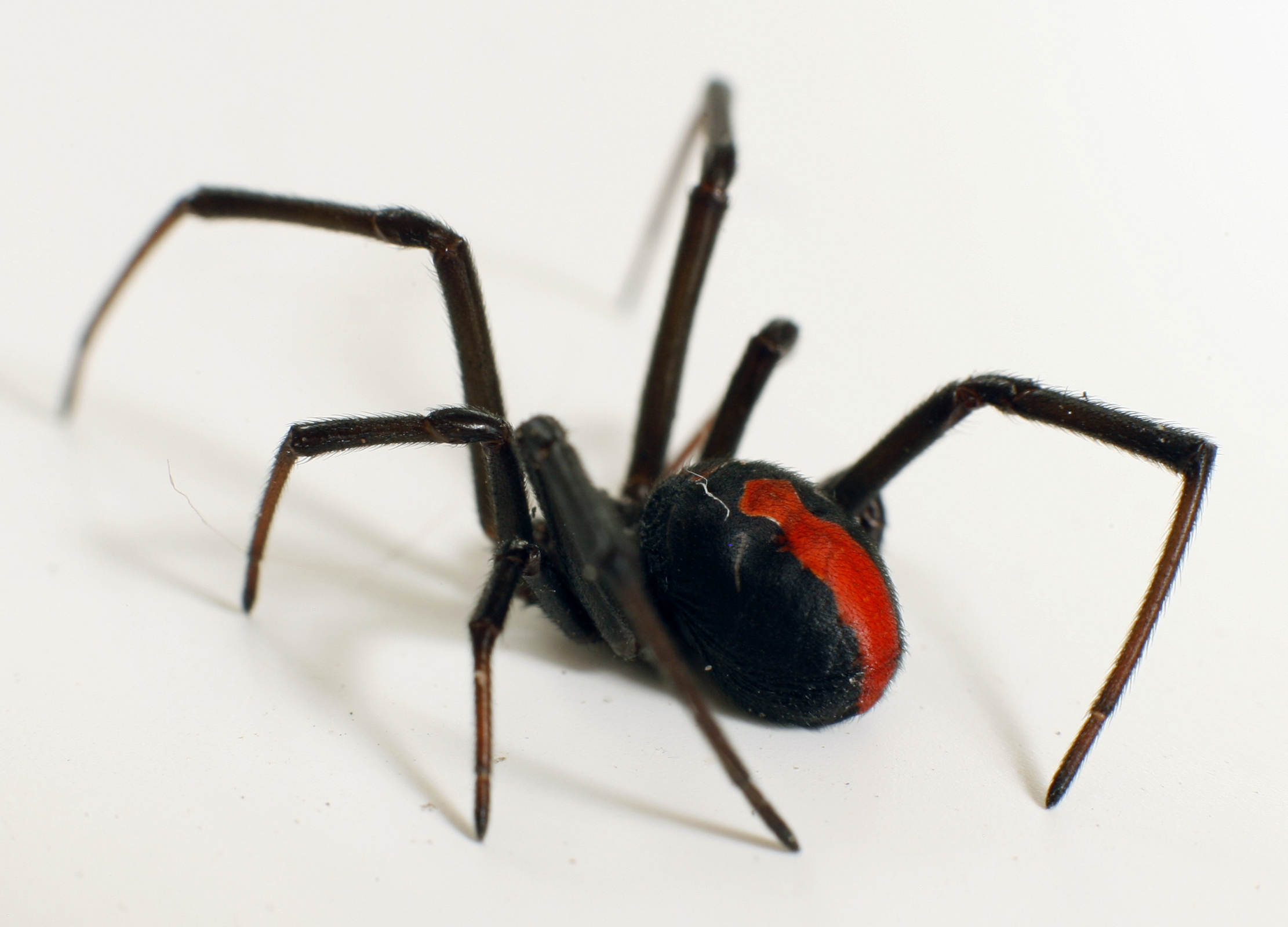
The distinctive red stripe of the adult female

The redback and its relatives in the genus Latrodectus are considered dangerous, alongside funnel-web spiders (Atrax and Hadronyche), mouse spiders (Missulena), wandering spiders (Phoneutria) and recluse spiders (Loxosceles). Venom is produced by holocrine glands in the spider's chelicerae (mouth parts). Venom accumulates in the lumen of the glands and passes through paired ducts into the spider's two hollow fangs. The venom of the redback spider is thought to be similar to that of the other Latrodectus spiders. It contains a complex mixture of cellular constituents, enzymes and a number of high-molecular-weight toxins, including insect toxins and a vertebrate neurotoxin called alpha-latrotoxin, which causes intense pain in humans.

In vertebrates, alpha-latrotoxin produces its effect through destabilisation of cell membranes and degranulation of nerve terminals, resulting in excessive release of neurotransmitters, namely acetylcholine, norepinephrine and GABA. Excess neurotransmitter activity leads to clinical manifestations of envenomation, although the precise mechanisms are not well understood. Acetylcholine release accounts for neuromuscular manifestations, and norepinephrine release accounts for the cardiovascular manifestations. Female redbacks have an average of around 0.08–0.10 mg of venom, and experiments indicate that the median lethal dose (LD_{50}) for mice at room temperature is 10–20% of this quantity (0.27–0.91 mg/kg based on the mass of the mice used), but that it is considerably deadlier for mice kept at lower or higher temperatures. Pure alpha-latrotoxin has an LD_{50} in mice of 20–40 μg/kg.

The specific variant of the vertebrate toxin found in the redback was cloned and sequenced in 2012, and was found to be a sequence of 1180 amino acids, with a strong similarity to the equivalent molecule across the Latrodectus mactans clade. The syndromes caused by bites from any spiders of the genus Latrodectus have similarities; there is some evidence there is a higher incidence of sweating, and local and radiating pain with the redback, while black widow envenomation results in more back and abdominal pain, and abdominal rigidity is a feature common with bites from the west coast button spider (Latrodectus indistinctus) of South Africa.

One crustacean-specific and two insect-specific neurotoxins have been recovered from the Mediterranean black widow (L. tredecimguttatus), as have small peptides that inhibit angiotensin-1-converting enzyme; (Note: These likely make the venom stronger by altering the victim's physiology. Angiotensin-converting-enzyme inhibitors, or ACE inhibitors, are a class of widely-prescribed medications used in hypertension and heart failure.) the venom of the redback, although little-studied, likely has similar agents.

=== Antivenom ===
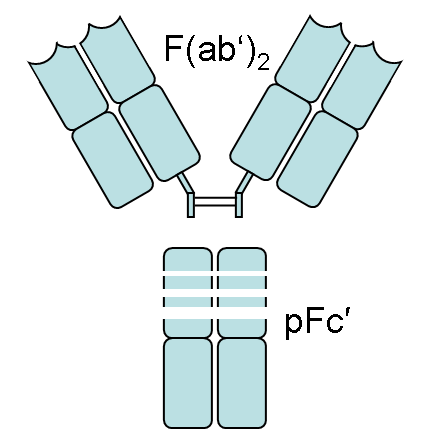
An antibody digested by pepsin yields two fragments: a F(ab')_{2} fragment and a pFc' fragment. Redback spider antivenom contains purified F(ab')_{2} derived from IgG in hyperimmune horse plasma.

Redback antivenom was developed by Commonwealth Serum Laboratories, then a government body involved with discovering antivenoms for many venomous Australian creatures. Production involves the milking of venom from redbacks and repeatedly inoculating horses with non-lethal doses. The horse immune systems makes polyclonal antibodies. Blood plasma, containing the antibodies, is extracted by plasmapheresis. The plasma is treated with pepsin, and the active F(ab')_{2} fragments are separated and purified. Each vial contains 500 units of redback antivenom in approximately 1.5 ml, which is enough to inactivate 5 mg of redback spider venom in a test tube. The antivenom has been safely administered to women in various stages of pregnancy. Redback antivenom has been widely used in Australia since 1956, although evidence from controlled studies for its effectiveness has been lacking. Recent trials show antivenom has a low response rate little better than placebo, and any effect is less than might be achieved with optimal use of standard analgesics. Further studies are needed to confirm or refute its effectiveness. It appears clinically active against arachnidism caused by Steatoda spiders; however, as these cases are often mild and the evidence of its effectiveness is limited, this treatment is not recommended. Similarly, the antivenom has been reported as effective with bites of L. katipo, and L. tredecimguttatus. Animal studies also support its use against envenomation from other widow spiders, having successfully been tested against venom from L. mactans, L. hesperus, and L. tredecimguttatus (synonym L. lugubris).

=== Signs and symptoms ===
Envenomation from a redback spider bite produces a syndrome known as latrodectism. A small but significant percentage of people bitten develop significant pain or systemic symptoms. The diagnosis is made from the clinical condition, often based on the victim being aware of a bite and ideally with identification of the spider. Laboratory tests are rarely needed and there is no specific test for the venom or latrodectism.

The redback's small size means that swelling or puncture marks at the bite site are uncommon. The bite may be painful from the start, but more often only feels like a pinprick or mild burning sensation. Within an hour, a more severe local pain may develop with local sweating and sometimes piloerection (goosebumps)—these three symptoms together are a classic presentation of redback spider envenomation. Pain, swelling and redness can spread proximally up a limb or away from the bite site and regional lymph nodes may become painful. Some subjects with delayed symptoms may present with a characteristic sweating and pain in the lower limbs, generally below the knees, or a burning sensation in the soles of the feet. This may eventuate even if the person was bitten somewhere else on their body.

Around one in three subjects develops systemic symptoms; after a number of hours, or rarely, delayed for more than 24 hours. Symptoms typically include nausea, vomiting, abdominal or chest pain, agitation, headache, generalised sweating and hypertension. Other non-specific systemic effects such as malaise and lethargy are also common. Rarely, other effects are reported such as neurological manifestations, fever and priapism (uncontrolled erection of the penis). Severe pain usually persists for over 24 hours after being bitten. Symptoms of envenomation may linger for weeks or even months. Rare complications include localised skin infection, seizure, coma, pulmonary oedema, or respiratory failure. Children, the elderly, or those with serious medical conditions are at much higher risk of severe effects resulting from a bite. Infants have died within hours of a bite, but adult fatalities have taken up to 30 days.

Children and infants may be unable to report being bitten, making it difficult to associate their symptoms with a spider bite. Symptoms seen in infants include inconsolable crying, refusing to feed and a general erythematous rash. (Note: Published studies specifically looking at effects in children have been retrospective only and too limited to draw conclusive results. A ten-year retrospective study of children bitten and admitted to hospital in Perth found that the clinical features resemble those of adult cases, and 21% required antivenom—a rate similar to adult use, while a ten-year retrospective study from Alice Springs Hospital found that 83% required antivenom therapy, with irritability, hypertension and sweating as the most common clinical symptoms.) Muscle aches and pains, and neck spasm are often seen in children over four years of age.

Unlike those of some other spiders, redback bites do not necrose. Latrodectism has been misdiagnosed as various medical conditions including acute hepatitis, sepsis, testicular torsion or an acute abdomen.

=== Treatment ===
Treatment is based on the severity of the envenomation. The majority of cases do not require medical care, and patients with localised pain, swelling and redness usually require only local application of ice and simple oral analgesia such as paracetamol. Pressure immobilisation of the wound site is not recommended. Keeping the victim still and calm is beneficial.

Hospital assessment is recommended if simple pain relief does not resolve local pain, or systemic symptoms occur. Opioid analgesics may be necessary to relieve pain. Antivenom has been historically given for adults suffering severe local pain or systemic symptoms consistent with latrodectism, which include pain and swelling spreading proximally from site, distressing local or systemic pain, chest pain, abdominal pain, or excessive sweating (diaphoresis). A significant proportion of bites will not result in envenomation or any symptoms developing; around 2–20% of bite victims have been treated with antivenom. (Note: The exact fraction of bites that require antivenom is difficult to quantify, because many bites are unreported. Figures from the manufacturer show that 344 cases required antivenom treatment in 1995, and in 2011 the figure was around 200. Estimates for the total number of bites range from 2,000 to 10,000. These estimates correspond to a broad range of about 2–17%, and reports have generally expressed this as "around" or "under" 20%. Two studies of redback victims who attended hospitals found that 6/23 (26%) and 32/150 (21%) received antivenom.) In an Australian study of 750 emergency hospital admissions for spider bites where the spider was definitively identified, 56 were from redbacks. Of these, 37 had significant pain lasting over 24 hours. Only six were treated with the antivenom.

The antivenom manufacturer's product information recommends one vial, although more has been used. Past guidelines indicated two vials, with a further two vials recommended if symptoms did not resolve within two hours, however recent guidelines state "antivenom is sometimes given if there is a history, symptoms and signs consistent with systemic envenoming, and severe pain unresponsive to oral analgesics ... however recent trials show antivenom has a low response rate little better than placebo, and any effect is less than might be achieved with optimal use of standard analgesics." The antivenom can be given by injection intramuscularly (IM) or intravenously (IV). The manufacturer recommends IM use, with IV administration reserved for life-threatening cases. In January 2008 toxicologist Geoffrey Isbister suggested IM antivenom was not as effective as IV antivenom, after proposing that IM antivenom took longer to reach the blood serum. Isbister subsequently found the difference between IV and IM routes of administration was, at best, small and did not justify routinely choosing one route over the other.

These concerns led two handbooks to recommend IV in preference to IM administration in Australian practice. (Note: A 2006 questionnaire found that of 218 Emergency physicians, 34 used the antivenom IM exclusively, 36 used IM then IV, 63 IV exclusively and 80 had no preference—that is, there was no consensus for preferred route.) Despite a long history of usage and anecdotal evidence of effectiveness, there is a lack of data from controlled studies confirming the antivenom's benefits. In 2014 Isbister and others conducted a randomized controlled trial of intravenous antivenom versus placebo for Redback envenomation, finding the addition of antivenom did not significantly improve pain or systemic effects, while antivenom resulted in acute hypersensitivity reactions in 3.6 per cent of those receiving it. The question of abandoning the antivenom on the basis of this and previous studies came up in the Annals of Emergency Medicine in 2015 where White and Weinstein argued that if the recommendations in the 2014 Isbister et al. paper were followed it would lead to abandonment of antivenom as a treatment option, an outcome White and Weinstein considered undesirable. Authors of the 2014 Isbister et al. paper responded in the same issue by suggesting patients for whom antivenom is considered should be fully informed "there is considerable weight of evidence to suggest it is no better than placebo", and in light of a risk of anaphylaxis and serum sickness, "routine use of the antivenom is therefore not recommended".

Before the introduction of antivenom, benzodiazepines and intravenous calcium gluconate were used to relieve symptoms of pain and distress, although calcium is not recommended as its benefit has not been shown in clinical trials.

Studies support the safety of antivenom, with around a 5% chance of an acute reaction, 1–2% of anaphylaxis and 10% chance of a delayed reaction due to serum sickness. Nevertheless, it is recommended that an injection of adrenaline be ready and available in case it is needed to treat a severe anaphylactic reaction, and also that the antivenom from the vial be administered diluted in a 100 ml bag of intravenous solution for infusion over 30 minutes. While it is rare that patients report symptoms of envenomation lasting weeks or months following a bite, there are case reports from the 1990s in which antivenom was reported to be effective in the relief of chronic symptoms when administered weeks or months after a bite. However, in the vast majority of cases, it is administered within 24 hours.

=== Prognosis ===
According to NSW Health, redback spider bites were considered not life-threatening but capable of causing severe pain and systemic symptoms that could continue for hours to days. In almost all cases, symptoms resolve within a week. Fatalities are extremely unlikely. In 2016, the death of a bushwalker from a redback spider bite was widely reported. In this case, the death occurred from secondary infection; and the man in question had just recovered from a serious car accident. Apart from that, there have been no deaths due to redback bite since the introduction of antivenom. (Note: No deaths since 1956 have been formally reported, but a spider expert at the CSIRO Division of Entomology told a news reporter that he had heard of one other death.) Before this, redback spider bites had been implicated in at least 14 deaths in Australia, however these cases cannot be definitively linked to the redback bite as the sole cause.

== Bites to animals ==
Redback spider bites are difficult to diagnose in pets unless witnessed. Dogs appear to have some resistance. They are at serious risk only if bitten many times, and rarely need antivenom. Cats are likely to be more susceptible and require antivenom, which can reverse symptoms very quickly. Guinea pigs, horses and camels are very susceptible. As with humans, the symptoms are predominantly autonomic in nature alongside pain at the bite site. Dogs may also suffer vomiting and diarrhea, muscle tremors or clonic contractions, and abdominal wall rigidity, while cats may salivate excessively, protrude their tongue or be overexcitable.

== Historical treatment of bites ==
Most traditional or historical first-aid treatments for redback spider bites are either useless or dangerous. These include making incisions and promoting bleeding, using ligatures, applying alkaline solutions, providing warmth, and sucking the venom out. In modern first aid, incising, sucking, applying bandages and tourniqueting are strongly discouraged. In 1893, the Camperdown Chronicle reported that a doctor noticed that a severely ill benumbed victim got much better overnight following treatment using injections of strychnine and cocaine; strychnine had been popular as a snake bite antidote, but it was not effective. As of 2011, administration of magnesium sulphate was reported to have had some benefit though evidence of effectiveness is weak.

== Cultural influence ==
Indigenous Australians in New South Wales mixed the spiders' bodies with the venom of snakes and pine tree gum to form a broth used to coat spear tips. Slim Newton drew popular attention to redbacks with his song "The Redback on the Toilet Seat", which won the Golden Guitar at the first Country Music Awards of Australia in 1973. Newton recalled an occasion when a friend used his outside toilet where the light globe had blown and reported he was lucky there was not a redback spider on the toilet seat. The phrase inspired him to write the song. A sculpture of an impossibly large redback, one of Australia's big things, was built in 1996 at Eight Mile Plains, Queensland. The Angels 1991 album Red Back Fever takes its name from the spider. Matilda Bay Brewing Company produces a wheat beer called Redback, with the distinctive red stripe as the logo. The redback formerly appeared in the name and emblem of the South Australia cricket team. The Airborne Redback, an Australian ultralight trike, was also named after the spider. Redback Boots is an Australian workboot manufacturing company, which uses the spider in its name and logo. In 2006 a redback spider postage stamp was designed as part of a "Dangerous Australians" stamp series, but was withheld from general circulation by Australia Post due to concerns that the realistic depiction would scare people opening their letter boxes. In 2012 an episode of the children's TV show Peppa Pig in which the title character picks up and plays with a spider was banned from Australian television due to fears that it would encourage children to pick up and play with redback spiders.

== See also ==
- List of common spiders of Australia
- Spiders of Australia
