= Periegops keani =

Conservation status
- Nationally Vulnerable (NZ TCS)

Scientific classification
- Domain: Eukaryota
- Kingdom: Animalia
- Phylum: Arthropoda
- Subphylum: Chelicerata
- Class: Arachnida
- Order: Araneae
- Infraorder: Araneomorphae
- Family: Periegopidae
- Genus: Periegops
- Species: P. keani

Binomial name
- Periegops keani Vink, Dupérré & Malumbres-Olarte, 2013

Species of spider

Periegops keani is a species of spider in the genus Periegops that is endemic to the North Island of New Zealand.

== Taxonomy ==
Periegops keani was described in 2013. The species is named after John Kean, who helped collect type specimens. The holotype is stored at the New Zealand Arthropod Collection under registration number NZAC03017709.

== Description ==
Like other members of the Periegops genus, P. keani has six eyes. The carapace is a red-orange colour on the anterior end but is orange on the posterior end. The abdomen is creamy brown and has a faint chevron pattern. The first pair of legs are orange brown with light orange ends, the other pairs of legs are yellow brown and darker at the proximal end. Chelicerae are red brown.

== Distribution and habitat ==
Periegops keani occurs in forests with deep leaf litter layers and well drained soil. P. keani is only known from the East Cape and the Alderman Islands of New Zealand.

== Behaviour ==
The species is not known to build webs for prey capture, but rather web is used as drag lines and to build silk retreats. The related P. suterii is likely a fast moving nocturnal hunter.

== Conservation status ==
Under the New Zealand Threat Classification System, this species is listed as "Nationally Vulnerable".
