= Spiders of Australia =

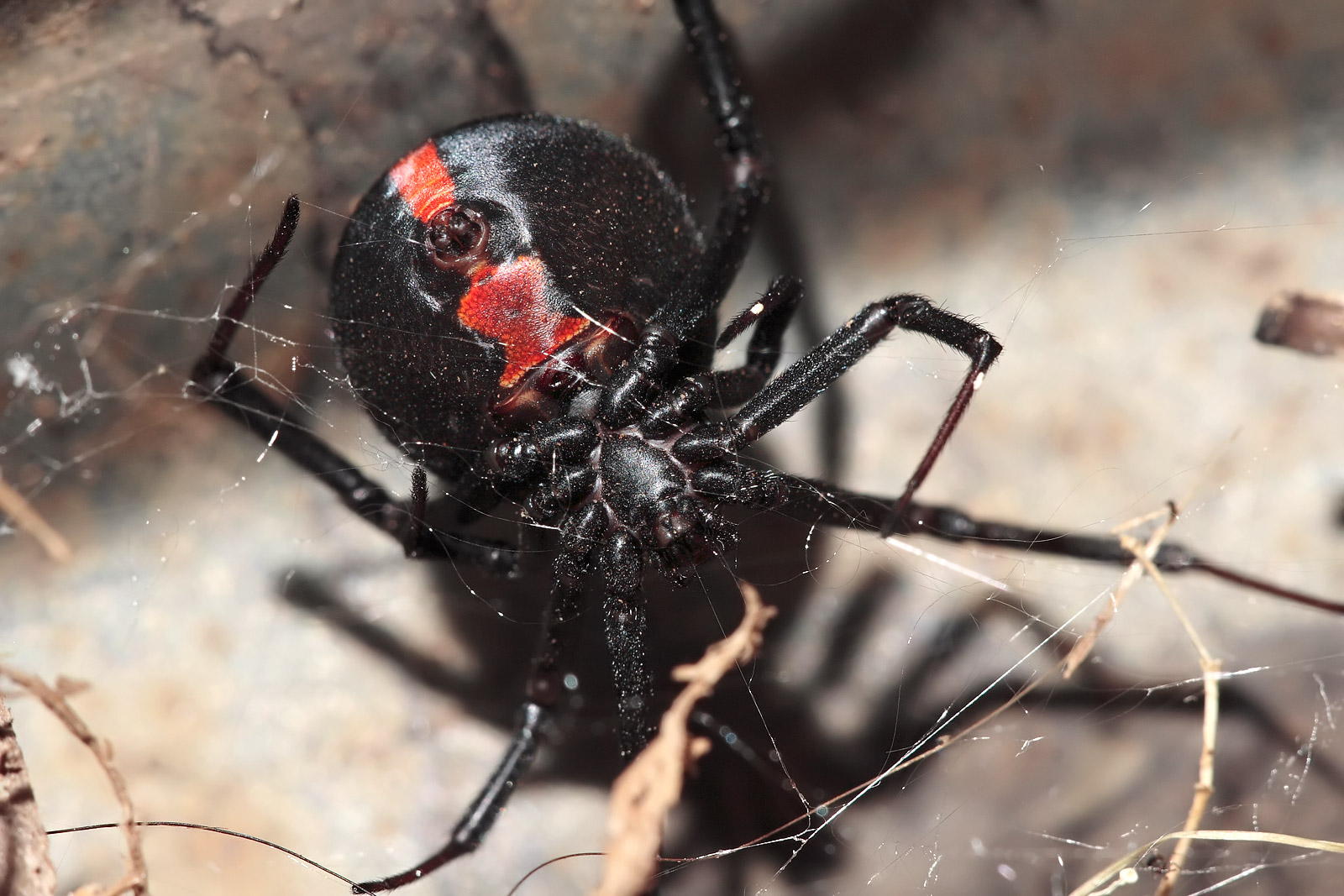
Redback spider

Australia has a number of highly venomous spiders, including the Sydney funnel-web spider, its relatives in the family Hexathelidae, and the redback spider, whose bites can be extremely painful and have historically been linked with deaths in medical records. Most Australian spiders do not have venom that is considered to be dangerously toxic. No deaths caused by spider bites in Australia have been substantiated by a coronial inquest since 1979. There are sensationalised news reports regarding Australian spiders that fail to cite evidence. A Field Guide to Spiders of Australia published by CSIRO Publishing in 2017 featuring around 836 species illustrated with photographs of live animals, around 381 genera and 78 families, introduced significant updates to taxonomy from Ramirez, Wheeler and Dmitrov.

Estimates put the total number of Australian spider species at about 10,000. Only around 3,600 have been described. Little information is known about many undiscovered species. New species are found each year.

== Early work on Australian spiders ==
An exploratory work on Australian spiders, Die Arachniden Australiens, nach der Natur beschrieben und abgebildet ("The arachnids of Australia, described and depicted according to nature", 1871–1890), was begun by L. Koch and continued by Graf E. von Keyserling. The collectors of that time included Eduard Daemel (1821–1900) entomologist, trader, explorer and collector; and Amalie Dietrich (1821–91) who spent 10 years in Australia collecting specimens for the Museum Godeffroy in Hamburg.

William Joseph Rainbow (1856–1919) was one of the most prolific of Australia's early home-grown contributors. He described around 200 new species of spiders. His Census of Australian Araneidae (1911) listed all 1,102 species known to that date.

Keith McKeown wrote Spider Wonders of Australia in 1936, followed by Australian Spiders: Their Lives and Habits in 1952 and Australian Spiders in 1963. Barbara York Main, based in Western Australia, wrote a Jacaranda Pocket Guide in 1964. John Child published Spiders of Australia in 1965. In 1967 V. V. Hickman, contributed Some Common Spiders of Tasmania. Ion Staunton was author of a factfinder book All about Australian Spiders in 1968. Densey Clyne published Australian Spiders in 1969. Ramon Mascord published Australian Spiders in Colour in 1970, Australian Spiders in 1978 and Spiders of Australia in 1980.

== Australian spider families ==
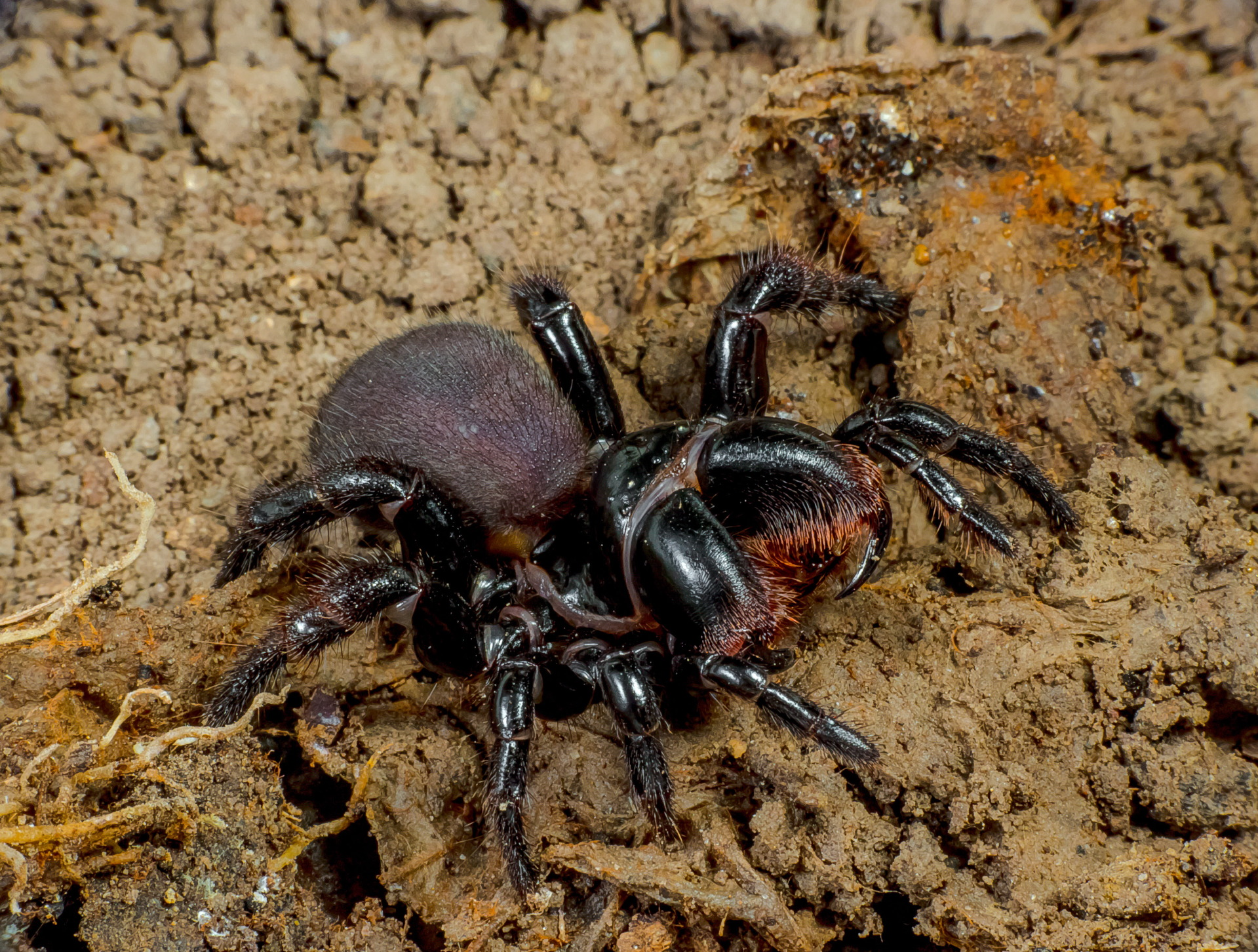
Mygalomorphae Actinopodidae Missulena bradleyi Eastern Mouse Spider The Gap Brisbane

Australian spider families include: triangular spiders (Arkyidae), ant-eating spiders (Zodariidae), armoured spiders (Tetrablemmidae), assassin spiders (Archaeidae), Australian funnelweb spiders (Hexathelidae), Australian tarantulas (Theraphosidae), brush-footed trapdoor spiders (Barychelidae), cave cobweb spinners (Nesticidae), comb-footed spiders (Theridiidae), comb‐tailed spiders (Hahniidae), cosmopolitan spider hunters (Cithaeronidae), crab spiders (Thomisidae), crevice weavers (Filistatidae), curtain-web spiders (Dipluridae), daddy long-legs spiders (Pholcidae), diamond-headed spiders (Stenochilidae), dwarf orb-weaving spiders (Symphytognathidae), false wolf spiders (Zoropsidae), fishing spiders (Pisauridae), flatties (Selenopidae), funnel weavers (Agelenidae), goblin spiders (Oonopidae), ground sac spiders (Trachelidae), ground spiders (Gnaphosidae), hackled-mesh weavers (Amaurobiidae), hair-spike synotaxids (Physoglenidae), huntsman spiders (Sparassidae), Intertidal and house spiders (Desidae), jumping spiders (Salticidae), lace-sheet weavers (Psechridae), long-claw spiders (Gradungulidae), long-jawed ground spiders (Gallieniellidae), long-jawed spiders (Tetragnathidae), long-spinneret speedsters (Prodidomidae), lynx spiders (Oxyopidae), mesh-web spiders (Dictynidae), midget ground weavers (Ochyroceratidae), midget house spiders (Oecobiidae), minute litter spiders (Mysmenidae), money spiders (Linyphiidae), mouse spiders (Actinopodidae), net-casting spiders (Deinopidae), orb-weavers (Araneidae), pirate spiders (Mimetidae), platform spiders (Stiphidiidae), prowling spiders (Miturgidae), ray spiders (Theridiosomatidae), recluse spiders (Sicariidae), red-and-black spiders (Nicodamidae), running crab spiders (Philodromidae), sac spiders (Clubionidae), saddle-legged trapdoor spiders (Ctenizidae), scuttling spiders (Cycloctenidae), seashore spiders (Anyphaenidae), shield spiders (Malkaridae), six-eyed ground spiders (Orsolobidae), slender sac spiders (Cheiracanthiidae), small swift spiders (Phrurolithidae), southern hunting spiders (Toxopidae), spiny‐legged sac spiders (Liocranidae), spiny trapdoor spiders (Idiopidae), spitting spiders (Scytodidae), swift spiders and ant mimics (Corinnidae), Tasmanian cave spiders (Austrochilidae), termite hunters (Ammoxenidae), tiny orb-weavers (Anapidae), tree sheet-web spiders (Cyatholipidae), tree trapdoor spiders (Migidae), tube-web spiders (Segestriidae), two-tailed spiders (Hersiliidae), unusual flatties (Trochanteriidae), venomless spiders (Uloboridae), wandering spiders (Ctenidae), white‐tailed spiders (Lamponidae), wide-clawed spiders (Periegopidae), wishbone spiders (Nemesiidae), wolf spiders (Lycosidae), woodlouse hunters (Dysderidae). Of these, 9 families are mygalomorph spiders, and the remaining are araneomorphs.

== Australian spider species ==
A complete checklist of Australian spiders can be found at the website of the Australasian Arachnological Society which is updated occasionally, independent of the World Spider Catalog (WSC), but generally following the WSC.

== Australian peacock spiders ==
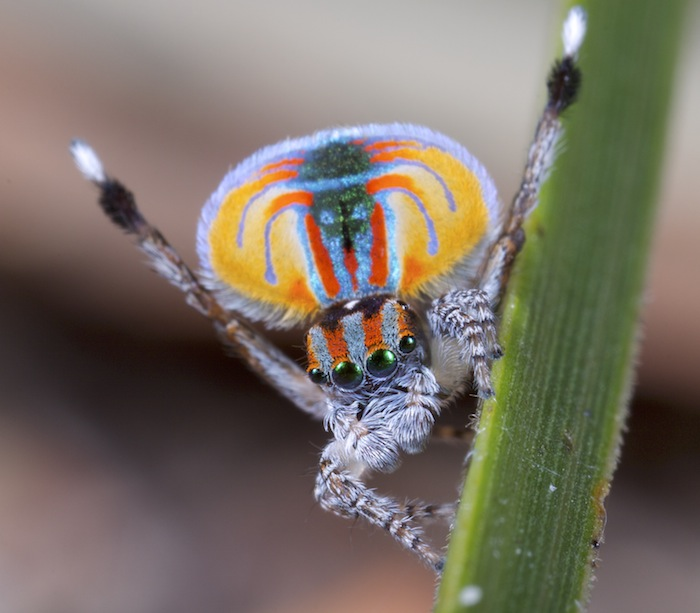
Maratus volans

Peacock spiders (Maratus spp.) are endemic to Australia. Peacock spider males extend brilliantly coloured fans and wave their legs in a display for their female partners. Their fans are flaps and fringes on the sides of the abdomen, normally folded away, are inflated and spread wide when displaying. Presently the Australian peacock spiders are assigned to two genera, Maratus Karsch 1878 and Saratus Otto & Hill 2017. Whereas only a single species of Saratus has been described, the genus Maratus includes a diverse variety of at least 107 described species endemic to Australia.

The anomalus group includes relatives of M. anomalus that can be distinguished by the presence of a blunt, bifurcated apex of the outer ring of the embolus above a shorter, sharply pointed inner apex of the male pedipalp. The female epigynum has heavily sclerotized (darker) ducts at the lateral and medial posterior margin of each fossa.

The calcitrans group is widely distributed in eastern Australia with many colourful species. Davies and Żabka (1989) figured a male M. ottoi from the vicinity of Brisbane, but did not give it a name. The most widely distributed species is M. plumosus, first found near Sydney. The male M. plumosus is also the most atypical of the group, with feathery plumes that it extends to the rear above its elevated and partly expanded fan. Males of all other species in the group inflate their spinnerets as they display to females. All members of the group have an asymmetric display in which they alternately extend or kick one leg III to one side, then the other leg III to the other side.

The chrysomelas group includes the widely distributed M. chrysomelas and the closely related M. nigromaculatus that is known only from the southern coast of Queensland. M. chrysomelas can be found in the arid interior and the tropical north. The fimbriatus group has been found at a number of locations in the grazed interior of New South Wales. The closely related M. licunxini was collected at Carnarvon Station Homestead in the interior of Queensland. These spiders are quite different from any other known Maratus, and their display includes the use of extended legs I. The harrisi group includes two closely related species with a lobate or rounded flap on either side of the fan. The discovery and later rediscovery of M. harrisi by Stuart Harris was the subject of an award- winning documentary entitled Maratus: A Documystery.

The mungaich group endemic to the southern part of Western Australia, includes species with very wide, brightly coloured fans covered with a pattern of bright red scales on a background of iridescent scales. All males in the group extend legs III, but several (M. avibus, M. bubo, M. caeruleus, and M. madelineae) closely bracket the fan with legs III as they display. The pavonis group is centered around Maratus pavonis. The spicatus group includes three very small species. Males rear their colourful fan and wave it from side to side but do not extend legs III as they display to females. The tasmanicus group includes two closely related species, one southeastern and one southwestern. Males have a large triangular fan with lobate flaps, each flap bearing a large black spot. The velutinus group have a velvety-black fan with elongated, black dorsal scales. The volans group contains three of the most colourful peacock spiders. Males of all three species have a large, fringed fan with distinctive figures consisting of pigmented scales on a background of iridescent scales.

== Australia's redback spider and Sydney funnelweb ==
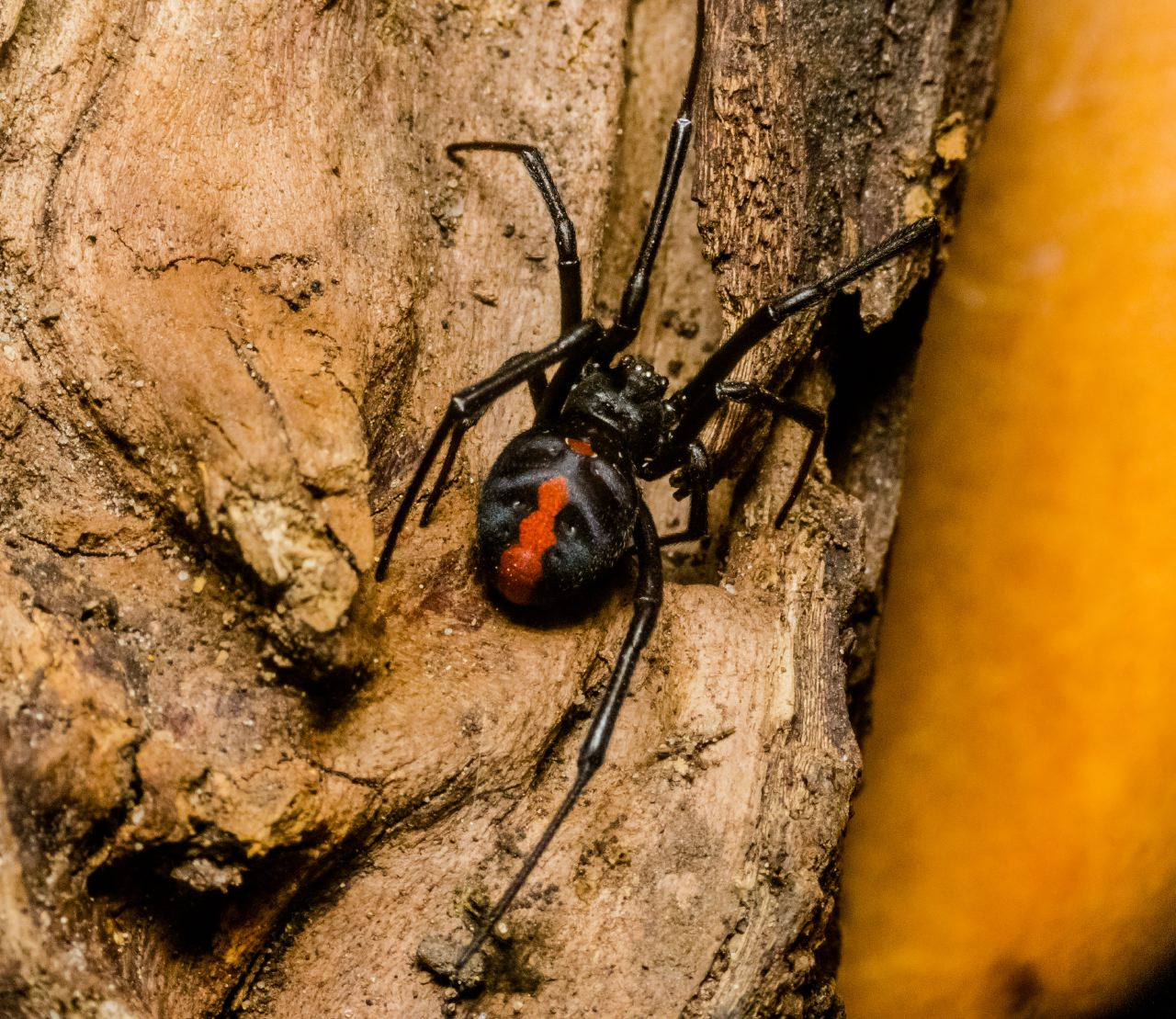
Redback spider Latrodectus hasselti, Myall Park Botanic Garden, Glenmorgan, Queensland Australia

The redback spider's original range is considered to be parts of the South Australian and Western Australian deserts, from where it has since invaded the rest of Australia and several places overseas, including New Zealand, the United Arab Emirates, the United Kingdom and Japan. The redback performs sexual cannibalism during mating, the female eating the male who sacrifices himself. The most obvious sign of a redback bite is extreme pain accompanied by localised sweating, beginning three to five minutes after being bitten. The sweating then becomes more generalised. This is the result of the body reacting to its own neurotransmitter chemicals leaking from nerve junctions at the bite site. Systemic effects such as feeling sick, abdominal pain and nausea can be brought on by trauma and associated pain. Four randomized controlled trials of redback antivenom, developed in 1956, have occurred. Isbister et al. reported in 2015 that any patient for whom antivenom is considered must be fully informed that there is considerable weight of evidence to suggest it is no better than placebo, there is a risk of anaphylaxis and serum sickness, and that routine use is therefore not recommended.

The Sydney funnelweb spider Atrax robustus, is considered to be the world's most dangerous spider. It is found within a 100 km diameter circle around Sydney. No deaths have occurred since the advent of an antivenom in 1981. Males wander at night in spring and summer in search of females. Some wander into houses or fall into swimming pools, where they can stay alive underwater for long periods. This species has been milked for research at James Cook University Cairns for use in cancer treatments.

== White-tailed spiders myths and hoaxes ==
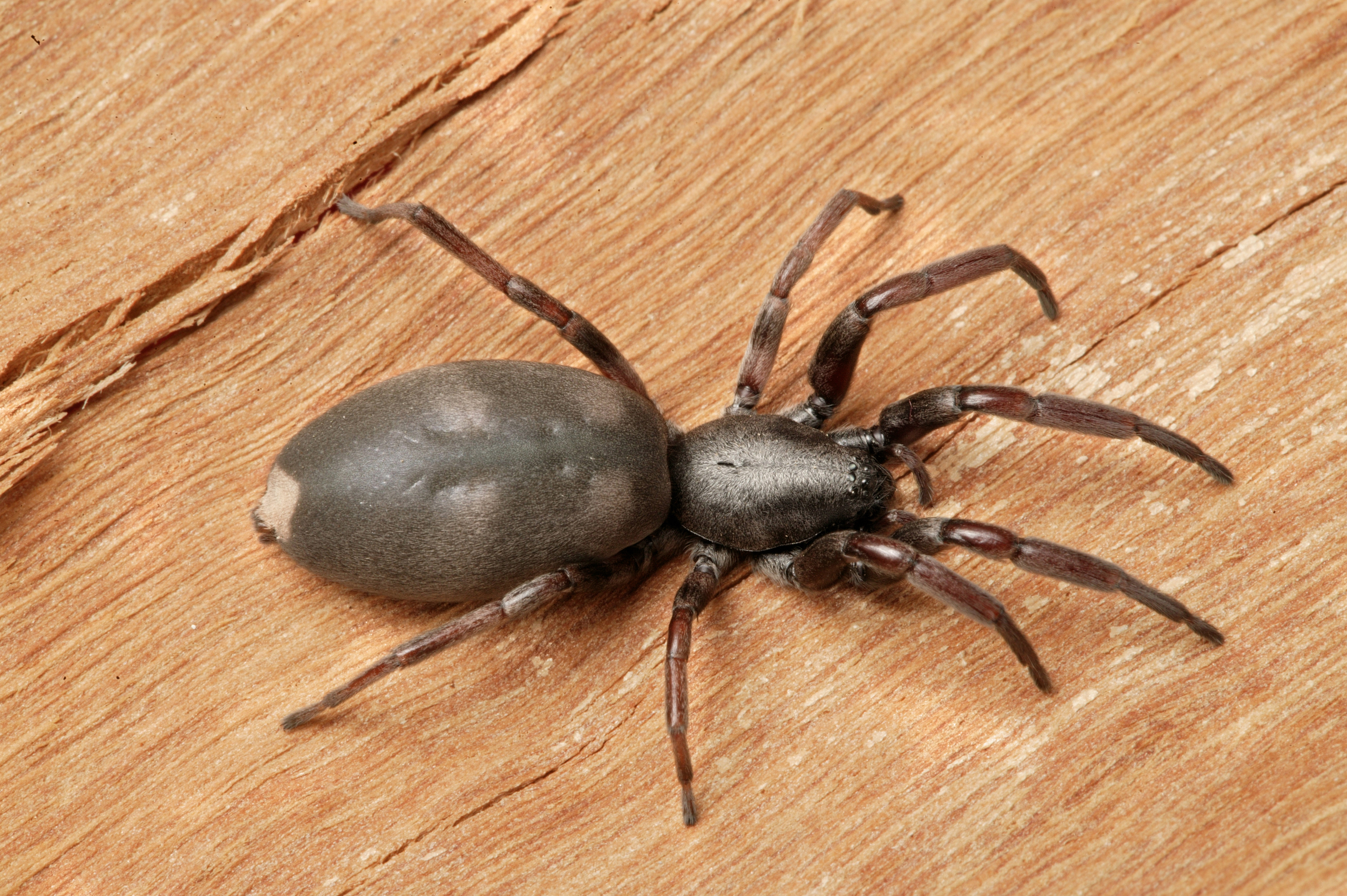
A white tailed spider

The urban myth of the bite of the white-tailed spider leading to severe illness and large flesh-eating wounds has never been verified. Studies of verified Lampona bites have not shown any case of necrotising ulcers. Lamponidae has nearly 200 known species, all but two in Australia. The most common species is Lampona cylindrata (throughout Australia but not eastern Queensland). The almost identical Lampona murina is restricted to eastern Australia. These two species are difficult to tell apart, the only clue in the field, without looking at genitalia, being location. Lamponids have eight eyes in two rows. The middle two eyes in the back row are oval shaped and often silvery or blueish. Most tend to be medium-sized, though the body length range of all species is 3 to 13 mm. The cigar-shaped abdomen (sometimes flattened) is narrowed at both ends. The cephalothorax, which is often wider than the abdomen, is similarly shaped but shorter, usually about half the length of the abdomen. Legs are slender, with two claws, usually more slender than those of the similar Gnaphosidae. Juveniles tend to have more or less obvious whitish marks on the upper surface of the abdomen.

The urban myth originated in 1982 when Australian medical researcher Struan Sutherland claimed the white-tailed spider as the culprit of severe skin ulcers and necrotic lesions. This was perpetuated by a number of articles in medical journals. Research by toxicologist Geoff Isbister and arachnologist Mike Gray investigated verified Lampona cylindrata bites, patients complained about pain, redness and itchiness, but researchers could find no resulting necrotic ulcers or other confirmed infections.

== Daddy long-legs potent venom myth ==
The daddy long-legs spider Pholcus phalangioides (so named because the abdomen is finger-shaped) is one of nine introduced pholcids in Australia. A myth developed around its venom, suggesting it would easily kill a person if only its fangs were big enough to penetrate skin. This claim is untrue. It may have arisen because of its ability to kill the redback spider Latrodectus hasseltii. Daddy long-legs spiders can tangle up and wrap redback spiders from a safe distance by means of their long legs, which they use to apply silk. Once the redback is fully trussed, the daddy long-legs spider bites at will and simply waits for the bigger spider to die so it can feed.

== Australian ant-slayer ==
Euryopis umbilicata is a small nocturnal theridiid that occupies eucalyptus tree trunks hunting large ants at night that travel along the tree trunk. The capture behaviour of the spider is extraordinary as it performs a highly acrobatic tumble over the approach ant to attach its sticky silk to the ant body, which suspends the ant in mid air. The spider then re-settles on the trunk and circles the ant, further entangling it with silk until the ant is immobilised and the spider can then bite and kill it. The capture success of this behaviour is highly successful with 85% of all staged encounters leading to successful prey capture. The spider is also unusual as it appears to be feeding almost exclusively on a single ant species, Camponotus consobrinus, in the area studied.

== See also ==
- Fauna of Australia
- List of common spider species of Australia
