= Periegops australia =

Scientific classification
- Kingdom: Animalia
- Phylum: Arthropoda
- Subphylum: Chelicerata
- Class: Arachnida
- Order: Araneae
- Infraorder: Araneomorphae
- Family: Periegopidae
- Genus: Periegops
- Species: P. australia

Binomial name
- Periegops australia Forster, 1995

Species of spider

Periegops australia is a species of spider in the genus Periegops that is endemic to South East Queensland in Australia.

== Etymology ==
The species name comes from the name of the continent of Australia, on which it is found.

== Taxonomy ==
Periegops australia was described in 1995 by Ray Forster.

== Description ==
Periegops australia, like other members of the Periegops genus, has only six eyes. Individuals have similar colouration to that found in P. suterii, but the chevron patterns on the abdomen are more strongly pigemented.
