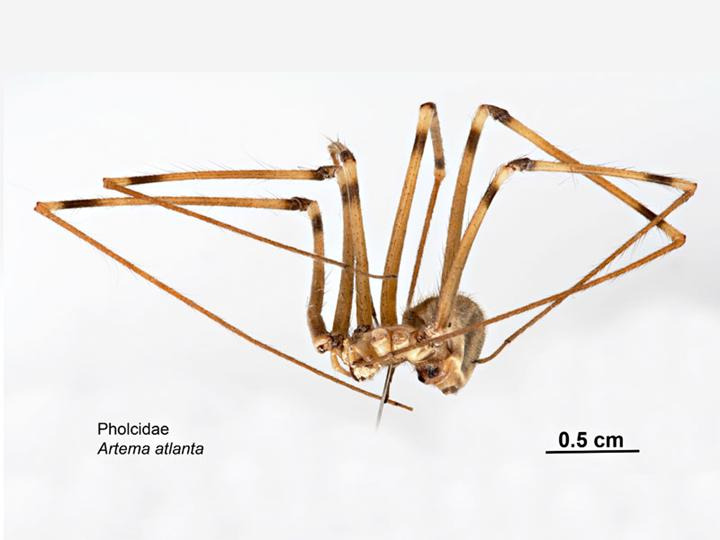
- Artema atlanta
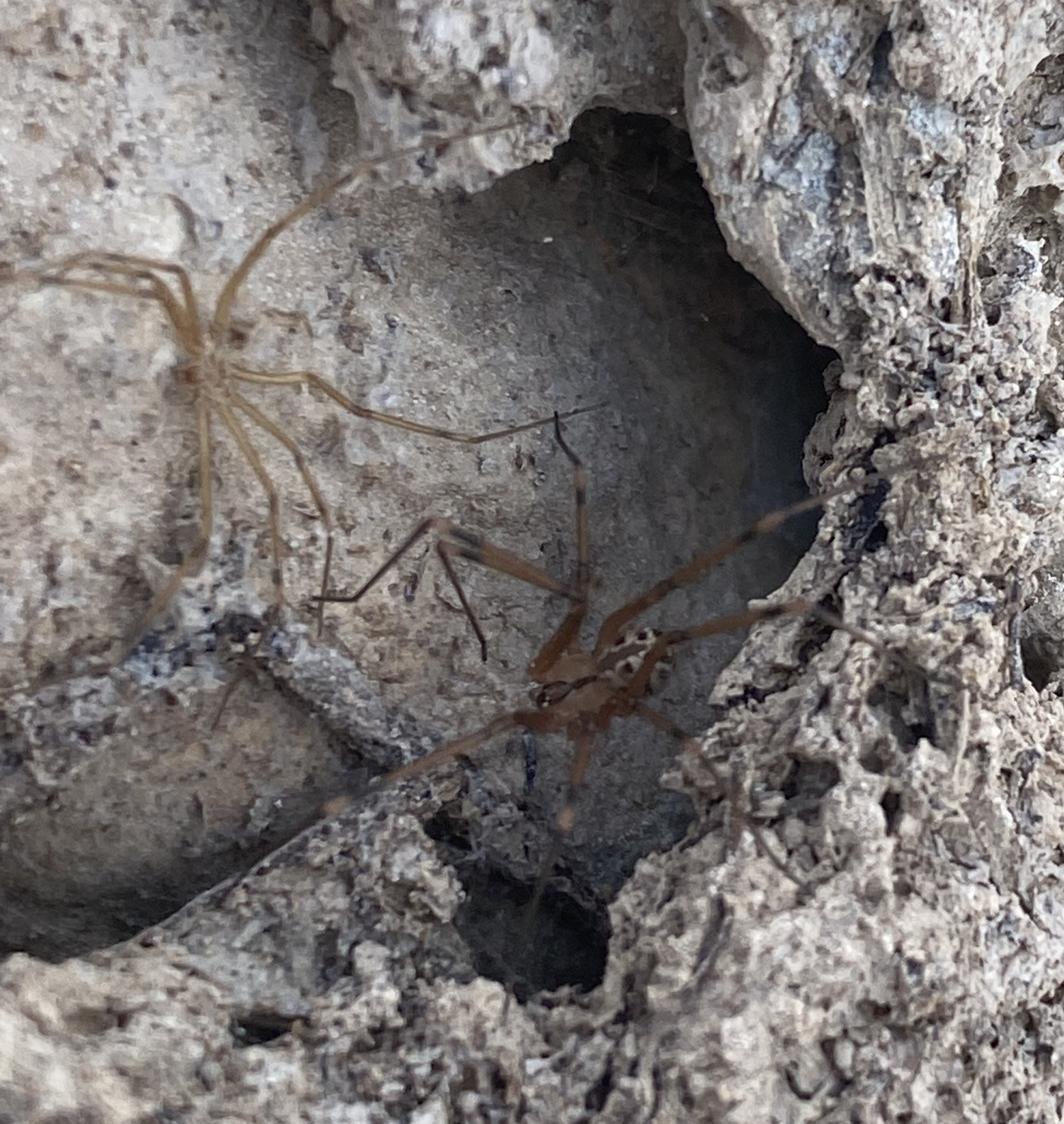
- A. doriae from Iran

Scientific classification
- Kingdom: Animalia
- Phylum: Arthropoda
- Subphylum: Chelicerata
- Class: Arachnida
- Order: Araneae
- Infraorder: Araneomorphae
- Family: Pholcidae
- Genus: Artema; Walckenaer, 1837

Type species
- A. atlanta Walckenaer, 1837

Species
- 12, see text
- blue: reported countries (WSC)

Synonyms
- Coroia González-Sponga, 2005; Pholciella Roewer, 1960

= Artema =

Genus of spiders

Artema is a genus of cellar spiders that was first described by Charles Athanase Walckenaer in 1837.

Its species are found from West Africa to Pakistan. A. atlanta has been introduced worldwide.

== Species ==
As of October 2025, this genus includes twelve species:

- Artema atlanta Walckenaer, 1837 – North Africa, Middle East. Introduced to both Americas, St. Helena, tropical Africa, Britain, Belgium, Greece, Turkey, tropical Asia, China, Japan, Taiwan, Australia, Pacific Islands (type species)
- Artema bahla Huber, 2019 – Oman
- Artema bunkpurugu Huber & Kwapong, 2013 – West Africa
- Artema dhofar Huber, 2019 – Oman
- Artema doriae (Thorell, 1881) – Turkey, Israel, United Arab Emirates, Iraq, Iran, Afghanistan. Introduced to Japan
- Artema ghubrat Huber, 2019 – Oman
- Artema kochi Kulczyński, 1901 – Eritrea, Ethiopia, Sudan, Yemen, Egypt?
- Artema magna Roewer, 1960 – Afghanistan, Pakistan?
- Artema martensi Huber, 2021 – Morocco
- Artema nephilit Aharon, Huber & Gavish-Regev, 2017 – Greece, Turkey, Cyprus, Israel, Jordan, Yemen? United Arab Emirates?
- Artema transcaspica Spassky, 1934 – Iran, Tajikistan, Turkmenistan, Uzbekistan
- Artema ziaretana (Roewer, 1960) – Afghanistan

== See also ==
- List of Pholcidae species
