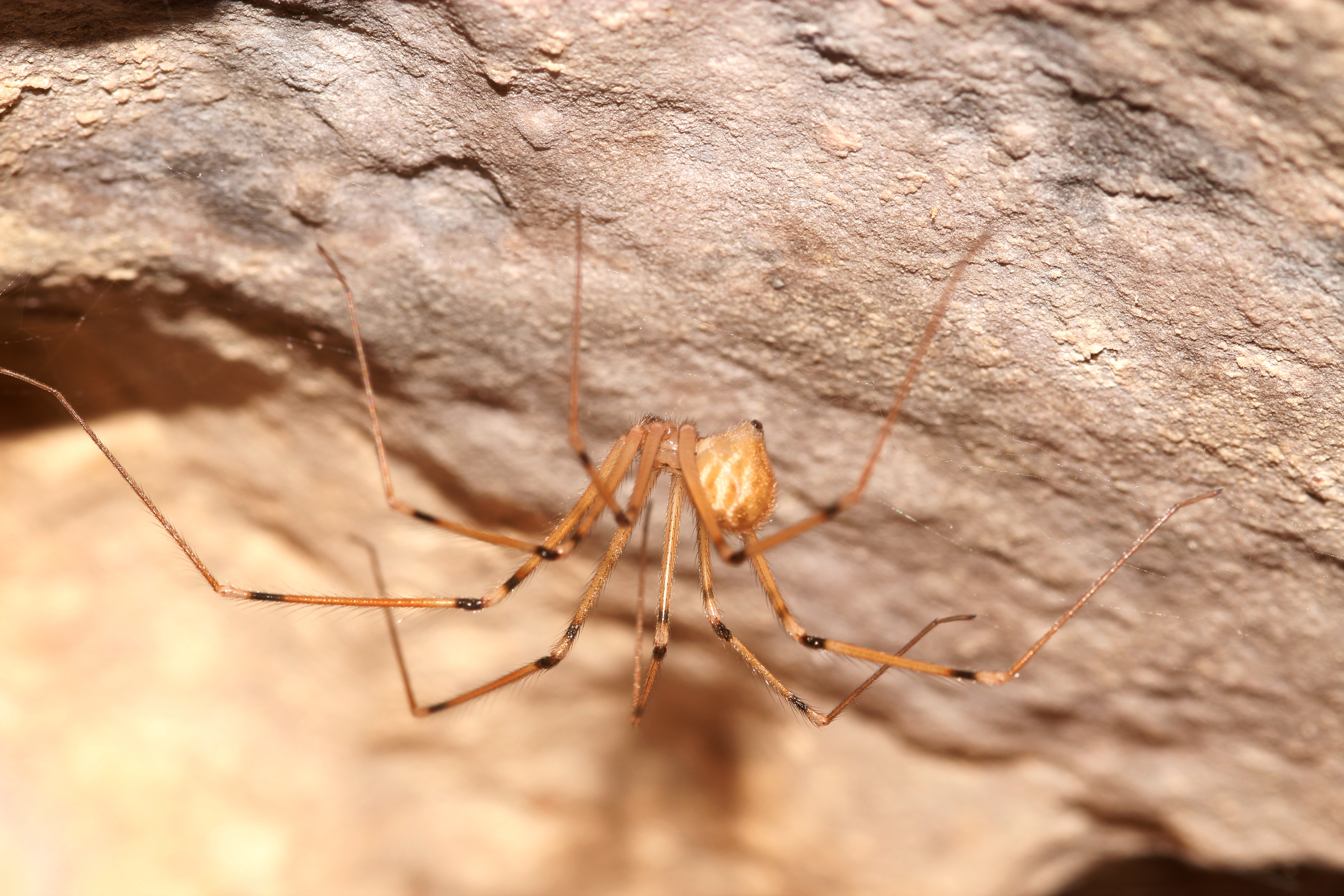

Scientific classification
- Domain: Eukaryota
- Kingdom: Animalia
- Phylum: Arthropoda
- Subphylum: Chelicerata
- Class: Arachnida
- Order: Araneae
- Infraorder: Araneomorphae
- Family: Pholcidae
- Genus: Artema
- Species: A. nephilit

Binomial name
- Artema nephilit Aharon, Huber & Gavish-Regev, 2017

= Artema nephilit =

Species of spider

Artema nephilit is a species of spider in the family Pholcidae. The species has been documented in Qatar and in other areas of the Middle East, with most sightings of the species coming from the West Bank.
