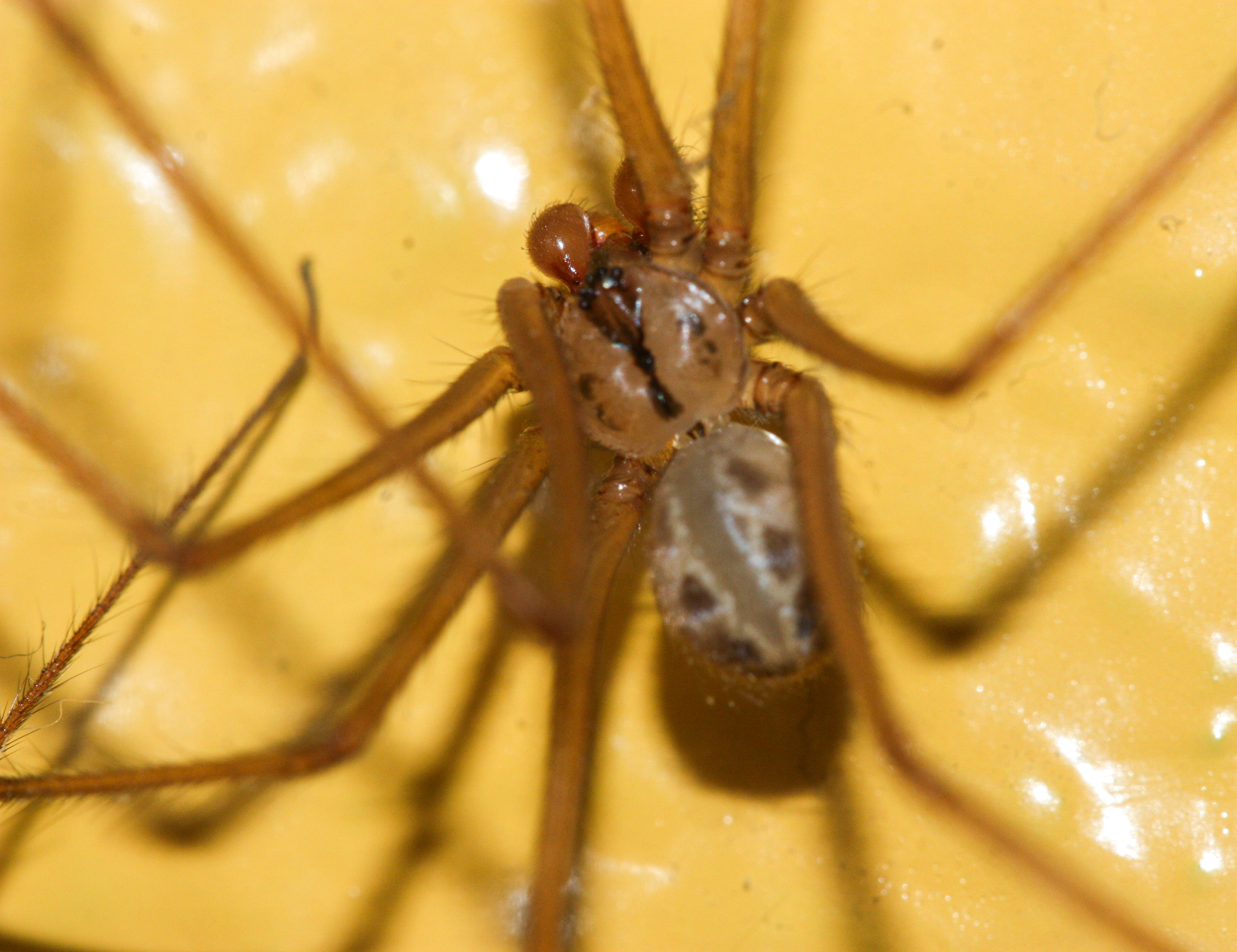
- A. atlanta from North America
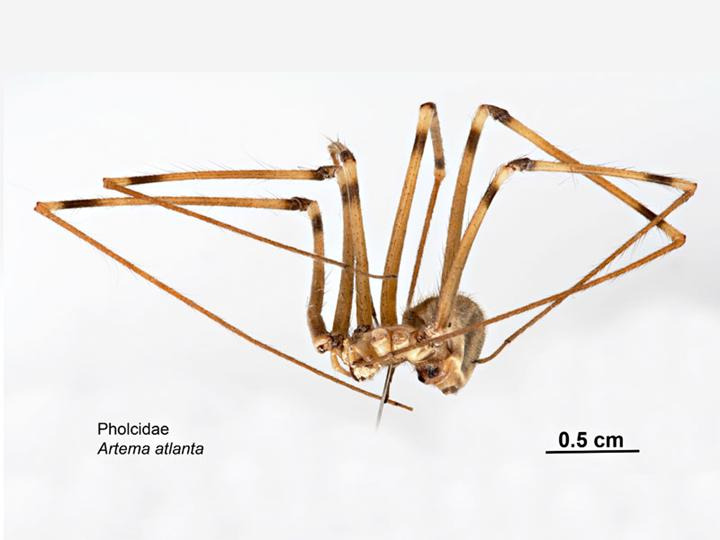
- A. atlanta from Barrow Island, Western Australia

Scientific classification
- Kingdom: Animalia
- Phylum: Arthropoda
- Subphylum: Chelicerata
- Class: Arachnida
- Order: Araneae
- Infraorder: Araneomorphae
- Family: Pholcidae
- Genus: Artema
- Species: A. atlanta

Binomial name
- Artema atlanta Walckenaer, 1837

Synonyms
- Artema mauriciana Walckenaer, 1837; Pholcus sisyphoides Doleschall, 1857; Artema convexa Blackwall, 1858; Pholcus borbonicus Vinson, 1863; Artema mauricia Vinson, 1863; Pholcus rotundatus Karsch, 1879; Artema sisyphoides (Doleschall, 1857); Artema kochii Kulczyński, 1901; Crossopriza sex-signata Franganillo, 1926; Coroia magna González-Sponga, 2005

= Artema atlanta =

Species of spider

Artema atlanta is a species of spider of the family Pholcidae with a pantropical distribution. It is commonly known as the giant daddy-long-legs spider, in Australia and South Africa. With a body length of 8–11 mm, it is the largest pholcid in the world.

== Description ==
Specimens of both sexes have a body length of 8–11 mm. Their first pair of legs is roughly 6.5 times the length of the body.

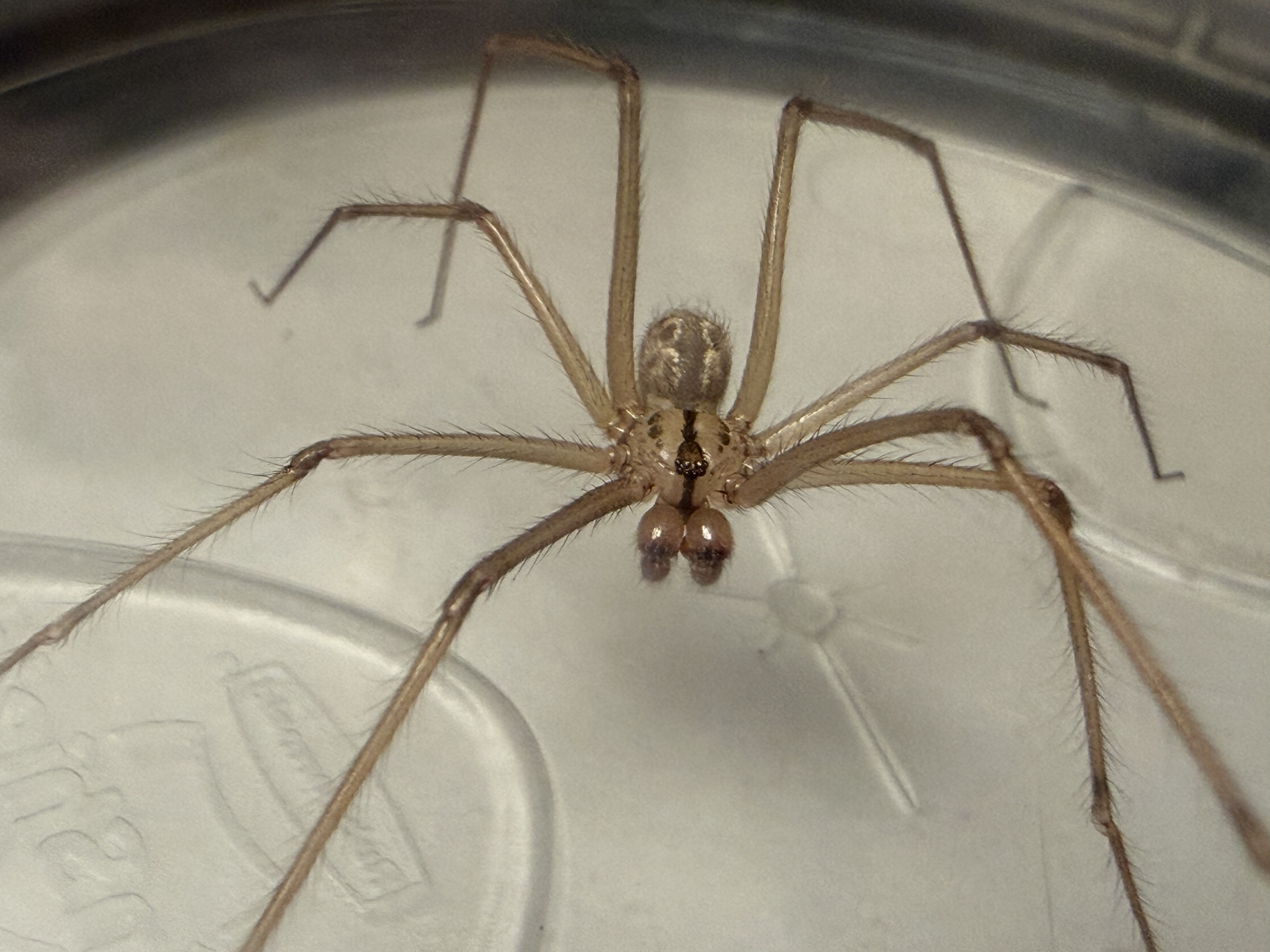
2026, Phoenix, Arizona

== Distribution ==
A. atlanta can be found in all tropical regions, such as the Seychelles, India, Indonesia, Sri Lanka, Vietnam and Brazil. It can be found on every continent (apart from Antarctica). It has been introduced into Belgium (Antwerp), and North America, where (as of 2009) colonies can be found in southern Arizona and southeastern California in the United States. Two spiders were found in a shipping container which arrived in England in 2004. It is suggested that the species originates from the Old World, although it was first described from Brazil.
