= The Redback on the Toilet Seat (album) =

Studio album by Slim Newton
- Released: November 1972
- Recorded: Hadley Records Audio Studios, Tamworth, New South Wales, Australia
- Genre: Country music
- Label: Hadley
- Producer: Eric W. Scott

Slim Newton chronology
The Redback on the Toilet Seat (1972)	What is it That's 'Bleeping' Our Country (1972)

The Redback on the Toilet Seat is the debut studio album by Slim Newton released in November 1972.

== Track listing ==
Side one
1. "The Redback on the Toilet Seat" (Newton) – 2:18
2. "It Shouldn't Happen to a Dog" (Newton) – 2:35
3. "Don't Point the Finger at Me" (Newton) – 2:03
4. "She Wouldn't Let Me Sleep" (Newton) – 2:00
5. "You Can Say That Again" (Newton) – 3:06
6. "Hijacked" (Newton) – 1:36

Side two
1. "This Here Song" (Newton) – 2:35
2. "It's No Use Complaining" (Newton) – 2:46
3. "Hound Dog" (Newton) – 3:08
4. "I'm Desperate" (Newton) – 1:54
5. "You Can't Win" (Newton) – 2:07
6. "You're Just Pint Sized" (Newton) – 2:37

== Credits ==
- Newton - vocals, rhythm guitar
- Garry Brown - electric guitar (except "This Here Song")
- Eric Newton - electric guitar (on "This Here Song")
- Frank Jones - bass guitar
- Goeff Cuneo - drums
- Ian Fenton - cover illustration
