= Slim Newton =

Australian country musician (1932–2023)

- Born: Ralph Ernest Newton; 22 October 1932; Perth, Western Australia, Australia
- Died: 8 January 2023 (aged 90) Port Macquarie, New South Wales, Australia
- Genres: Country
- Occupations: Singer-songwriter, welder
- Instruments: Vocals, guitars (acoustic, electric, rhythm)
- Years active: 1949–2023
- Labels: Hadley, Enrec, Larrikin, Dingo Track

Ralph Ernest Newton (22 October 1932 – 8 January 2023), professionally Slim Newton, was an Australian country music singer-songwriter. In June 1972 he issued an extended play, The Redback on the Toilet Seat, which peaked at No. 3 on the Go-Set National Top 40 Singles Chart and sold over 100,000 copies. In 1973 Newton won a Golden Guitar Trophy at the inaugural Country Music Awards of Australia for Top Selling Record for the EP. Newton continued his career as a part-time musician and released several albums while also working in his trade as a welder. In 1977 the Country Music Association of Australia inducted him into the Australasian Country Music Hands of Fame, and then in 2009 into the Australian Roll of Renown.

== Early life ==
Ralph Ernest Newton was born on 22 October 1932 and grew up in Perth with two brothers. At the age of 17 he was an apprentice welder when he started performing country and western music at week-ends. Newton was 19 when he had two motor bike accidents leaving him with "crockery teeth and one leg an inch shorter than the other". He finished his apprenticeship at the age of 21 and while working his trade he continued performing as a musician.

== Career ==
=== 1954–1970: Early years ===
In 1954 he toured Western Australia and followed with a solo northern Australian tour in the next year. By 1957 he was living in Sydney where he performed on the Reg Lindsay Show both on radio and at local venues. Also that year fellow country artists, Rick and Thel Carey, recorded "You Can Say That Again", which was co-written with Newton. He returned to Perth in 1959. In the mid-1960s he formed a group, The Mavericks, with Mick Kodra.

=== 1971–2023: "The Redback on the Toilet Seat" ===
Newton had continued his songwriting and, in 1971, after contact from Eric Scott of Hadley Records, he and his family relocated to Tamworth, so that he could start recording his own material at their studios. His debut release was a four track extended play, The Redback on the Toilet Seat, which appeared by June 1972 and was produced by Scott. The EP peaked at No. 3 on the Go-Set National Top 40 Singles Chart, with a run of 15 weeks. According to David Kent in his Australian Chart Book 1970–1992 the EP appeared in the Kent Music Report Singles Chart on 19 June 1972, peaked at No. 5 for two weeks and remained in the top 100 for 28 weeks. Fellow country music artist, Slim Dusty, recalled in his autobiography, Another Day, Another Town (1996), how he had often been mistaken as the song's author.

In August 1972 Newton told Nan Musgrove of The Australian Women's Weekly of an occasion where a visiting friend used his outside toilet in Perth where the light globe had blown. The friend reported that he was lucky there were no redback spiders on the toilet seat. The phrase inspired Newton to write the track, "The Redback on the Toilet Seat", which he indicated was "easy to write, that most songs come fairly easy except when you have to write one on demand, then and there". Newton's follow up EP, How Did the Redback Die?, appeared in October and continued the theme to explain what happened to the spider. In 1973 Newton was awarded a Golden Guitar Trophy at the inaugural Country Music Awards of Australia for Top Selling Record.

Newton received further recognition for his work from the Country Music Association of Australia: in 1977 he was inducted into the Australasian Country Music Hands of Fame, and then in 2009 into the Australian Roll of Renown.

In November 2003 Newton was honoured by a celebration of his life in country music with his children and grandchildren performing his signature song. Newton attended with his partner, Mary Holdom, and the couple also provided some duets. Stephen has worked with John Williamson both at Enrec Studios (when located in Sydney) and as a concert guitarist. In 2009 Stephen relocated Enrec Studios to the former Hadley Records venue.

=== Personal life and death ===
In December 1956 Slim Newton performed with the Gill Brothers Rodeo and Circus in Canberra, he was promoted as "West Australia's own Cowboy Singer". In September 1958 he married Fay Edwards née Gill in Campsie and they returned to Perth the next year. The couple had five children: Eric (1959–1981), Stephen, Lisa, Linda and Jodi. By the time Jodi was born the family had relocated to Tamworth.

Eric had died in a car accident and, in 1983, Stephen established a studio, Enrec, in Tamworth in honour of his older brother. As of June 1984 Newton was working as a welder for Wetherall Engineering in Tamworth but was still touring periodically. In 1992 Stephen relocated Enrec Studios to Kurri Kurri and then on to Sydney.

Newton died on 8 January 2023, at the age of 90.

== Discography ==
=== Albums ===
List of albums
Title	Details
The Redback on the Toilet Seat	Released: 1972; Label: Hadley Records (HLP 1210); Format: LP
What is it That's 'Bleeping' Our Country	Released: 1975; Label: Hadley Records (HLP 1222); Format: LP
There are False Teeth in the Toilet	Released: 1979; Label: Hadley Records (HLP 1238); Format: LP, Cassette
I'm a 9 Stone Cowboy	Released: 1980; Label: Hadley Records (HLP 1249); Format: LP, Cassette
It Came from the Heart When He Sang	Released: 1982; Label: Hadley Records (HLP 1269); Format: LP, Cassette
The Waterbed Song	Released: 1985; Label: Hadley Records (HLP 1283); Format: LP, Cassette
Momma Your Guitar's Come Back Home	Released: 1996; Label: Larrikin Records (LRF397); Format: CD
It's Me Past And Present	Released: 2001; Label: Dingo Track Records (DTRSN01CD); Format: CD
From Bush Ballads T' Bulldust	Released: 2006; Label: Dingo Track Records (DTRSN02CD); Format: CD

=== Extended plays ===
List of EP, with Australian chart positions
Title	Album details	Peak chart positions
Title	Album details	AUS
The Redback on the Toilet Seat	Released: June 1972; Label: Hadley Records (HEP 537); Format: 7" LP	3
How Did the Redback Die?	Released: October 1972; Label: Hadley Records (HEP 539); Format: 7" LP	—
Pride of the West	Released: 1973; Label: Hadley Records (HEP 542); Format: 7" LP	—
Buck's Bad Luck Hadley	Released: 1973; Label: Hadley Records (HEP 546); Format: 7" LP	—

== Awards ==
=== Country Music Awards of Australia ===
The Country Music Awards of Australia (CMAA) (also known as the Golden Guitar Awards) is an annual awards night held in January during the Tamworth Country Music Festival, celebrating recording excellence in the Australian country music industry. They have been held annually since 1973.

Year	Nominee / work	Award	Result (wins only)	Ref.
1973	Redback on the Toilet Seat	Top Selling Record	Won	
1977	Slim Newton	Hands of Fame	imprinted	
2009	Slim Newton	Australian Roll of Renown	inductee	

=== Tamworth Songwriters Awards ===
The Tamworth Songwriters Association (TSA) is an annual songwriting contest for original country songs, awarded in January at the Tamworth Country Music Festival. They commenced in 1986.

Year	Nominee / work	Award	Result (wins only)
1992	Slim Newton	Songmaker Award	awarded

== Bibliography ==
- Newton, Slim (2008). Redback on the Toilet Seat. illustrated by Craig Smith. Malvern, South Australia: Omnibus Books. ISBN 978-1-86291-752-1.
