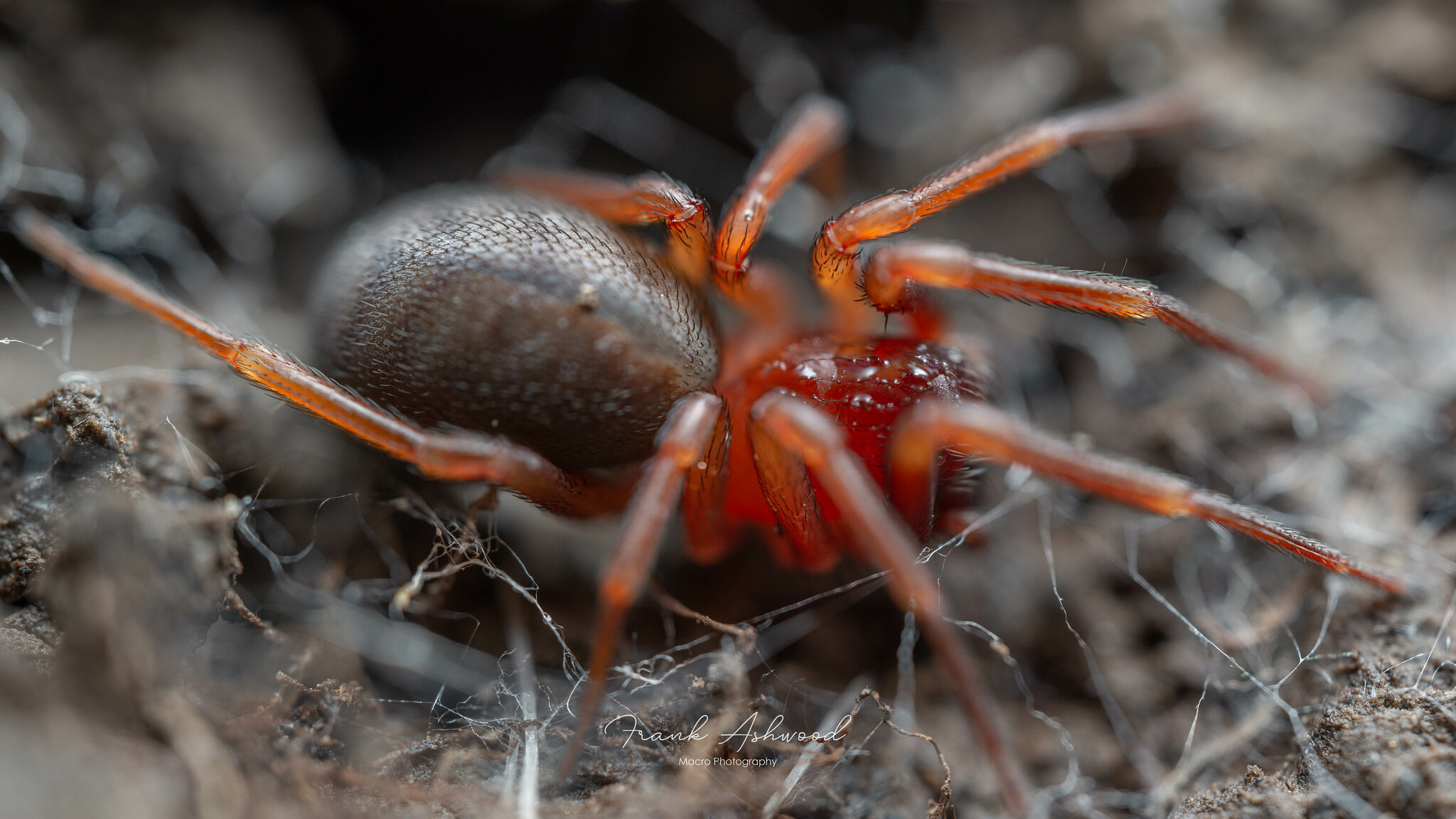
- Periegops suterii

Scientific classification
- Kingdom: Animalia
- Phylum: Arthropoda
- Subphylum: Chelicerata
- Class: Arachnida
- Order: Araneae
- Infraorder: Araneomorphae
- Family: Periegopidae; Simon, 1893
- Genus: Periegops; Simon, 1893

Diversity
- 3 species
- blue: reported countries (WSC)

= Periegops =

Family of spiders

Periegops is a genus of spiders with six eyes instead of the usual eight. It is the only genus in its family (Periegopidae) and has three described species. It was long considered to be a member of Sicariidae or Segestriidae until Raymond Forster elevated it to the family level in 1995.

== Taxonomy ==
Periegops was first described in 1893 by Eugene Simon from a specimen of P. hirsutus (a synonym of P. suterii).

== Description ==
This genus of spider has only six eyes, as opposed to eight, the latter being more common for spiders. Body length varies from 5.9 mm to 10.9 mm depending on species and sex. Carapace is an orange colour and is darker on the anterior side. The abdomen is brown or creamy brown and usually have a chevron pattern. The family can be distinguished by the pattern of eye positions, which are in three clusters of two eyes.

== Species ==
As of January 2026, the World Spider Catalog accepts three species:

- Periegops australia Forster, 1995 — Australia (Queensland)
- Periegops keani Vink, Dupérré & Malumbres-Olarte, 2013 — New Zealand (North Island)
- Periegops suterii (Urquhart, 1892) — New Zealand (South Island)

== Habitat ==
Periegops occur in forest habitat, where there are deep leaf litter layers and well drained soil.

== Behaviour ==
No Periegops species has been observed creating webs for prey capture, but rather has been observed using silk to create drag lines and silk retreats. Periegops are likely all fast moving, nocturnal hunters.

In P. suterii, females have been found with two to three males with them, which may imply that the female has a way of attracting males to them.
