= The Redback on the Toilet Seat =

EP by Slim Newton
- Released: June 1972
- Recorded: 24 October 1971, Hadley Records Audio Studios, Tamworth, New South Wales, Australia
- Genre: Country music
- Length: 9:26
- Label: Hadley

Slim Newton chronology
The Redback on the Toilet Seat (1972)	How Did the Redback Die? (1972)

The Redback on the Toilet Seat is an Australian country music EP, with all four tracks written and performed by Slim Newton. It was released in June 1972 and peaked at No. 3 on the Go-Set National Top 40 Singles Chart. It was recorded at Hadley Records Audio Studios (catalogue number HEP 537) in Tamworth, New South Wales, and it was the first record Newton made. The title song references the Redback spider (Latrodectus hasselti), also known as the Australian black widow.

At the 1973 Country Music Awards of Australia, the EP won Top Selling Album of the Year.

== Track listing ==
Side one
1. "The Redback on the Toilet Seat" (Newton) – 2:18
2. "A Pint of Water in a Jerry Can" (Newton) – 2:21

Side two
1. "Something Seems to Tell Me" (Newton) – 2:21
2. "If You Want to Make Something out of this Life" (Newton) – 2:26

== Credits ==
- Newton – vocals, acoustic guitar, electric guitar
- Gary Brown – bass guitar
- Ken Grills – drums
- Ian Fenton – cover illustration

== Cover versions ==
"The Redback on the Toilet Seat" has been covered by several artists including: John Williamson, The Wolverines on Occasional Course Language (2008).
