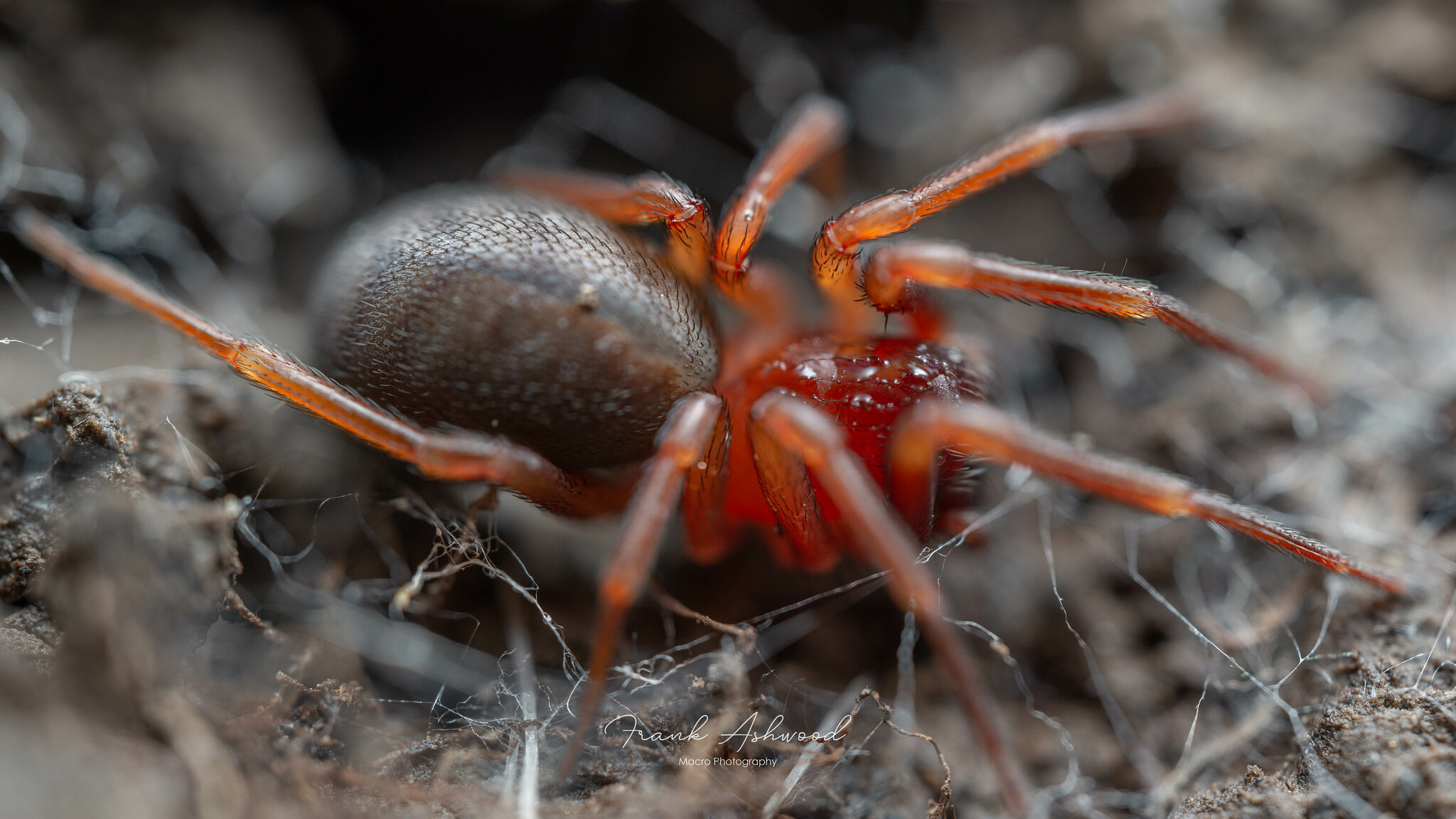
- Periegops suterii found in the Banks Peninsula, Canterbury

Conservation status
- Relict (NZ TCS)

Scientific classification
- Kingdom: Animalia
- Phylum: Arthropoda
- Subphylum: Chelicerata
- Class: Arachnida
- Order: Araneae
- Infraorder: Araneomorphae
- Family: Periegopidae
- Genus: Periegops
- Species: P. suterii

Binomial name
- Periegops suterii (Urquhart, 1892)

Synonyms
- Segestria suterii Urquhart, 1892; Periegops hirsutus Simon, 1893; Periegops suteri (Urquhart, 1892)

= Periegops suterii =

Species of spider

Periegops suterii is a species of spider in the genus Periegops that is endemic to the South Island of New Zealand.

== Taxonomy ==
Periegops suteria was first described in 1892 by Arthur T. Urquhart and was placed in the Segestria genus. Specimens for this description were collected from Port Hills near Christchurch. Independently, Eugene Simon described Periegops hirsutus in 1893, which was also the first description of the Periegops genus. In 1935, Segestria suteria was moved to the Periegops genus by Elizabeth Bangs Bryant after examining types sent to her from the Canterbury Museum. In 1946, P. hirsutus was recognized as a synonym of P. suterii by George Chamberlain. The type specimen is currently considered missing.

== Description ==
Like all members of the Periegops genus, P. suterii has six eyes. The carapace is a red-orange colour on the anterior end but is orange on the posterior end. The abdomen has a black brown chevron pattern. The first pair of legs are orange brown with light orange ends, the other pairs of legs are yellow brown and darker at the proximal end. Chelicerae are red brown. Male body length is 6.6 mm and female body length is 8.1 mm.

== Habitat and distribution ==
Periegops suterii occurs in forests with well drained soil and deep leaf layers. Within these habitats, they may be found under logs, rocks and leaves. They can occur in podocarp and beech forest. P. suterii is only known to occur in Banks Peninsula and Riccarton Bush in Canterbury. Within these locations, P. suterii has a patchy distribution. The distribution of the species suggests it could be considered a relict species.

== Behaviour ==
Periegops suterii isn't known to build webs for prey capture, but rather web is used as drag lines and to build silk retreats. P. suterii is likely a fast moving nocturnal hunter.

Females have been found with two to three males with them, which may imply that the female has a way of attracting males.

== Conservation status ==
Under the New Zealand Threat Classification System, this species is listed as "Relict" with the qualifiers of "Conservation Dependent", "Range Restricted" and "Biologically Sparse".

== Gallery ==
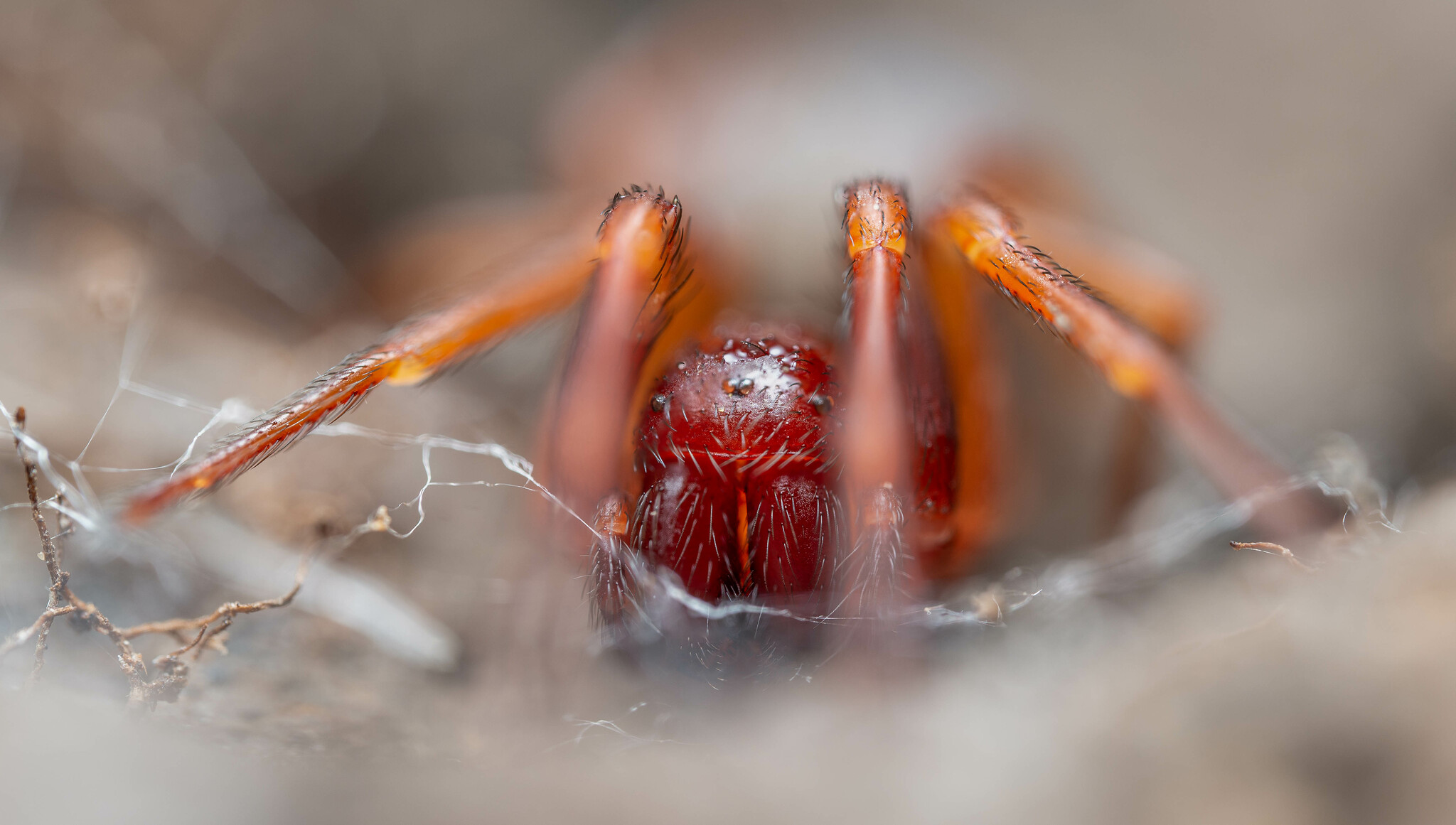

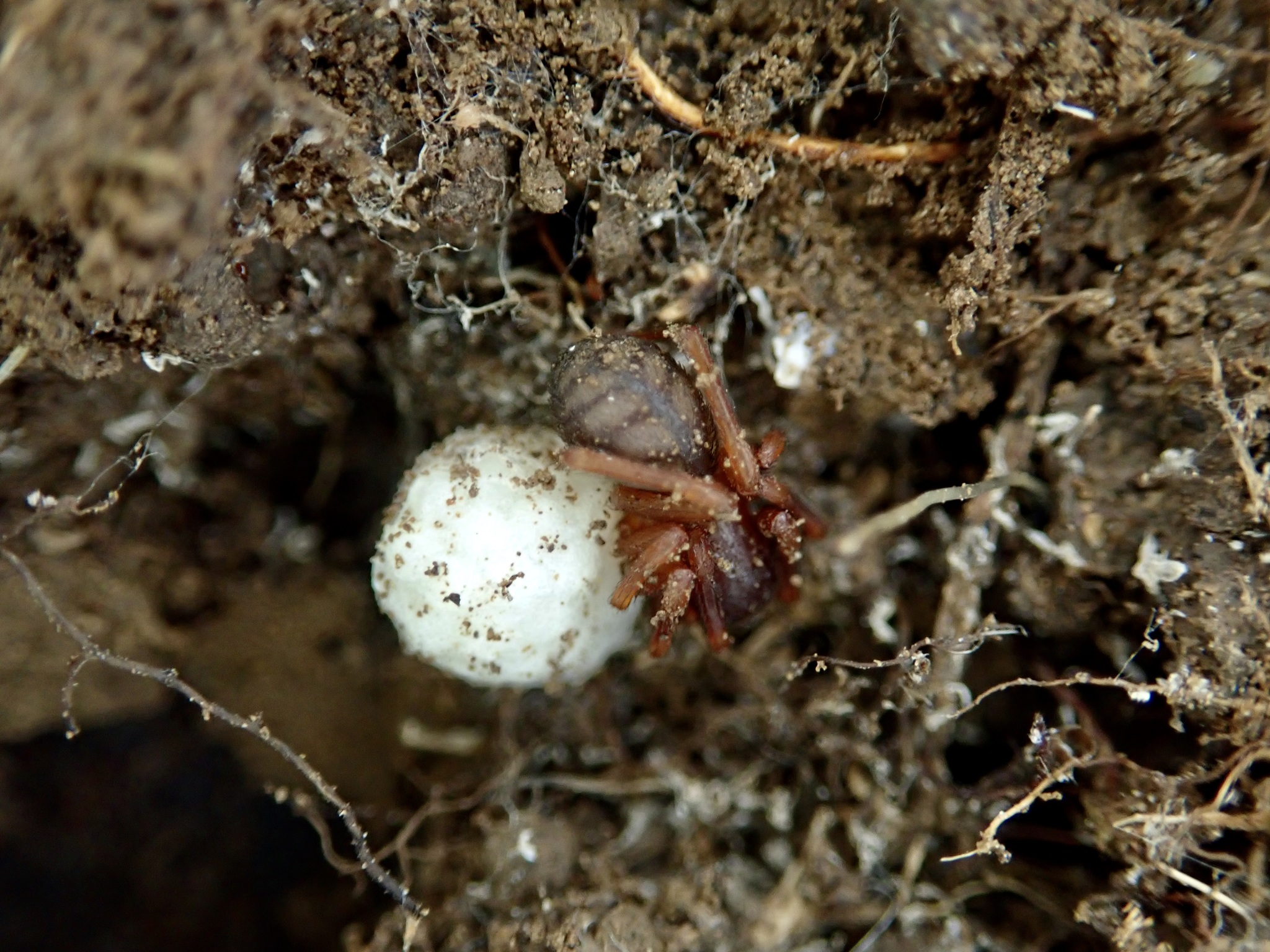

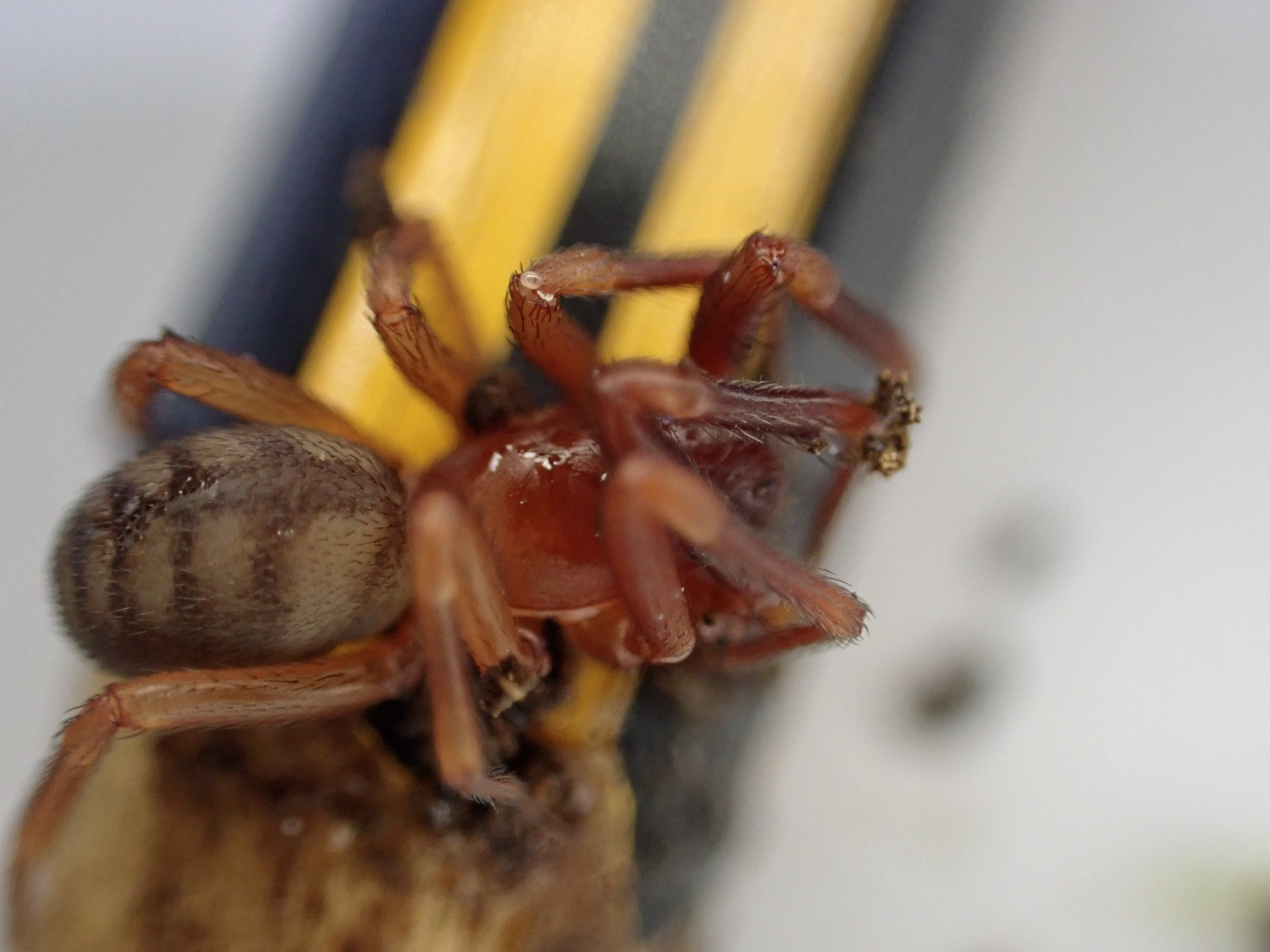

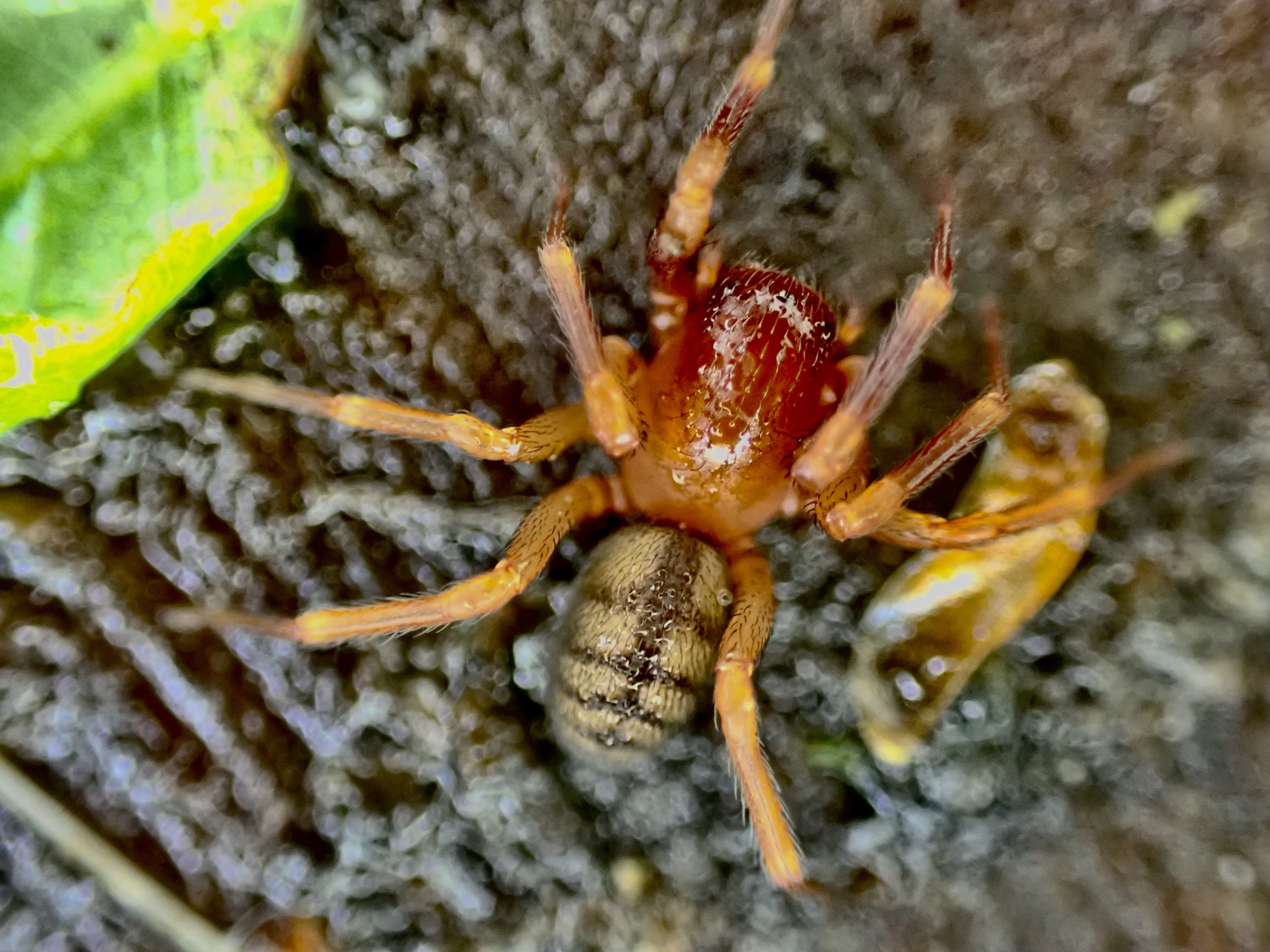
