= Pathophysiology of spider bites =

Reactions to venom of spider bites

The pathophysiology of a spider bite is due to the effect of its venom. A spider envenomation occurs whenever a spider injects venom into the skin. Not all spider bites inject venom – a dry bite, and the amount of venom injected can vary based on the type of spider and the circumstances of the encounter. The mechanical injury from a spider bite is not a serious concern for humans. Some spider bites do leave a large enough wound that infection may be a concern. However, it is generally the toxicity of spider venom that poses the most risk to human beings; several spiders are known to have venom that can cause injury to humans in the amounts that a spider will typically inject when biting.

Only a small percentage of species have bites that pose a danger to people. Many spiders do not have mouthparts capable of penetrating human skin. While venoms are by definition toxic substances, most spiders do not have venom that is toxic to humans (in the quantities delivered) to require medical attention. Of those that do, fatal outcomes are rare.

Spider venoms work on one of two fundamental principles; they are either neurotoxic (impairing the nervous system) or necrotic (dissolving tissues surrounding the bite). In some cases, the venom targets vital organs and systems.

== Neurotoxic venom ==
Spiders paralyze prey with neurotoxic venom of some sort. A few have a venom that cross reacts with mammalian nervous system, though the specific manner in which the nervous system is attacked varies from spider to spider.

- Widow spider venom contains components known as latrotoxins, which cause the massive release of the neurotransmitters causing muscle contractions, sweating, and gooseflesh. This can affect the body in several ways, including causing painful abdominal cramps
- The atracotoxins of Australian funnel-web spiders work by opening sodium channels, causing excessive neural activity including strange sensations (paresthesias), muscle contractions, unstable blood pressure (hypertension or hypotension). The venom may cause fluid to accumulate in the lungs (pulmonary edema) that can be fatal.
- The venom of Brazilian wandering spiders is also a potent neurotoxin, which attacks multiple types of ion channels. Principally generating severe pain that travels up the limb, autonomic effects, including painful erections, occur with moderate envenomation. With severe envenomation heart and lung failure can result in death. In addition, the venom contains high levels of serotonin, making an envenomation by this species particularly painful.

== Necrotic venom ==
Spiders known to have necrotic venom occur most notoriously in the family Sicariidae, which includes both the recluse spiders and the six-eyed sand spiders in the genus Hexophthalma and Sicarius. Spiders in this family possess a known dermonecrotic agent sphingomyelinase D, which is otherwise found only in a few pathogenic bacteria. Bites by spiders in this family can produce symptoms ranging from minor localized effects, to severe dermonecrotic lesions, up to and including severe systemic reactions including renal failure, and in some cases, death. Even in the absence of systemic effects, serious bites from sicariid spiders may form a necrotising ulcer that destroys soft tissue and may take months and very rarely years to heal, leaving deep scars. The damaged tissue may become gangrenous and eventually slough away. Initially there may be no pain from a bite, but over time the wound may grow to 10 inches (25 cm) in extreme cases. Bites usually become painful and itchy within two to eight hours, pain and other local effects worsen 12 to 36 hours after the bite, and then necrosis will develop over the next few days.

Systemic effects are unusual but include mild nausea, vomiting, fever, rashes, and muscle and joint pain. Rarely, more severe symptoms occur including red blood cell destruction (hemolysis), low platelets (thrombocytopenia), and loss of clotting factors (disseminated intravascular coagulation). Children may be more susceptible to systemic loxoscelism effects. Deaths have been reported for both the brown recluse and the related South American species Loxosceles laeta and Loxosceles intermedia related to hemolysis and the injury that results to the kidney. Deaths attributed to brown recluse where no brown recluse live, highlight misdiagnosis and misconception

Numerous other spiders have been associated with necrotic bites. The white tailed spider (Lampona spp.) had been suspected in necrotic lesions for decades only to be exonerated by the first extensive review. An early report Sac spider causing necrosis has been frequently referenced. Recent surveys doubt the incidence of necrosis. Necrosis from Hobo spider, a member grass spider family Agelenidae, bite is under the same debate and doubt.

== Differential diagnosis ==
The skin manifestations of recluse venom are thought to arise from Sphingomyelinase D. The enzyme acts on cell membranes. The action is therefore limited as the venom can only spread through a set area. The originally red swollen area becomes a dry black ulcer. Skin infections, in particular the widespread methicillin-resistant Staphylococcal aureus, remain swollen and red. Pus forms and the lesion often drains. It can continue to spread and expand as the bacteria grow. Other skin lesions and infections are much more common than spider bites. Physicians have reported brown recluse spider bites where no brown recluse exist. Ed: in 100 pictures retrieved online only 3 were consistent with Sphingomyelinase pathophysiology.

== Incidence of severe envenomation ==
Despite public concern about spider bites, severe envenomation is rare. Few spiders have toxins in sufficient volume to harm people. Of those that do, some have limited habitats. Spider behavior may be caused by limited human interaction. Spider defense against predators include camouflage, and escape by falling or running. Biting is a last resort and the amount of venom injected varies greatly. Spider venom toxicity can be evaluated in experimental animals, or reported from accidental bites. Different experimental animals have different reactions to the same venom. The dose that is lethal to half of the animals poisoned is the LD50 and those values for mice is below. The LD50 of many poisons is known for humans but not that of spider venom.

Serious bites develop symptoms quickly, within the hour. While a serious medical condition may result (see latrodectism and loxoscelism) fatalities are exceedingly rare. Appropriate medical treatment can improve speed of recovery. The scenario given in movies such as Arachnophobia, where bite victims die within minutes, does not occur. Small children are considered an exception because the amount of venom dispersed throughout the body is many times the concentration in an adult. There is at least one recorded case of a small child dying within 15 minutes of a bite from a Sydney funnel-web spider; that death occurred before the development of an antivenom. Since the antivenom was developed there have been no fatalities due to this species.

The neurotoxic venoms of the Sydney funnel-web spider and the Brazilian wandering spider are both known to have lethal complications. For the Brazilian wandering spider only 1 out of 200 bites is serious, in part because they appear to be capable of biting without injecting venom. Atrax robustus has a limited distribution and few bites are reported yearly.

The geographical range of the widow spiders is very great. As a result, far more people are exposed, worldwide, to widow bites than any other spider. Widow spiders bites are most often mild but may rarely cause serious complications in people. Fatalities had been reported as high as 5% of bites and as low as 0.2% of bites.

Loxosceles live in areas of South America and the southern United States. There are populations of desert and Arizona recluse in the Western deserts of the United States, but bites are rarely reported from these species. In established areas many spiders may populate the home. Even still the "reclusive" nature of the spider limits true bites. More bites had been reported in Florida than recluses ever found in the area.

=== Clinical presentation ===
| Genus | Species | Common name | Body length | Venom amount | LD-50 | Alternate LD-50 | Deaths reported |
|---|---|---|---|---|---|---|---|
| Atrax | A. robustus | Sydney funnel-web spider | 24–32 mm. | 0.25 mg (F) and 0.81 mg (M) 2 mg | 0.16 mg/kg | unknown | 13 attributed deaths from 1927 to 1980 |
| Hadronyche | H. formidabilis | Northern tree funnel-web spider | 23–45 mm. | | | | 1 death. High rates of severe envenoming. |
| Hadronyche | H. cerberea | Southern tree funnel-web spider | | | | | High rates of severe envenoming. |
| Latrodectus | L. mactans | Black widow | 8–15 mm | 0.02–.03 mg. | 0.002 mg/kg * | 0.9 mg/kg | 36 deaths recorded from 1965 to 1990 in the U.S. 5% of reported bites prior to antivenom availability |
| Latrodectus | L. tredecimguttatus | Malmignatte | (approx. same) | (approx. same) | 0.68 μg/kg | 16.25 μg/kg | possibility of deaths in Southern Europe first attributed to the brown recluse, suggesting larger frequency of the bites. |
| Loxosceles | L. reclusa | Brown recluse | 1.2 cm (0.75 in) 6–10 mm | .13–.27 mg. | | | necrosis and amputation of limbs more common, deaths rare |
| Loxosceles | L. intermedia | | | | 0.48 mg/kg 0.34 mg/kg (SC) | | |
| Loxosceles | L. laeta | Chilean recluse | | | 1.45 mg/kg | | High rates of severe envenomation. |
| Loxosceles | L. gaucho | | | | 0.74 mg/kg | | |
| Phoneutria | P. bahiensis | a Brazilian wandering spider | 30 mm | 1.079 mg | .00061–.00157 mg/kg | | cardiac failure reported in 5 out of 12 bitten |
| Phoneutria | P. boliviensis | a Brazilian wandering spider | 30 mm | 1.079 mg. | .00061–.00157 mg/kg | | |
| Phoneutria | P. fera | a Brazilian wandering spider | 30 mm | 1.079 mg | .00061–.00157 mg/kg | | disputed effectiveness of the antivenin – 4 deaths out of 7 administered |
| Phoneutria | P. nigriventer | a Brazilian wandering spider | 3–5 cm (1.25–2 in) | 2.15 mg 1.079 mg. | 15.20 ng/mg. 00061–.00157 mg/kg | 200 μg/kg (0.2 ng/mg) | severe cardiac failure, signs of priapism and irreversible damage to the central nervous system recorded. 18 deaths in Brazil alone from 2007 to 2010 |
| Phoneutria | P. reidyi | a Brazilian wandering spider | 30 mm | | .00061–.00157 mg/kg | 0.3 mg/kg | |
| Hexophthalma | spp. | Six-eyed sand spiders | 17 mm | | | | large necrotic lesions |
| Haplopelma | H. schmidti (previously H. huwenum, Selenocosmia huwena) | Chinese bird spider | | 0.70 mg/kg | | 1 death reported of a 5-year-old child suffocated, possibly caused by allergens to the venom. | |
| Poecilotheria | P. ornata | Fringed ornamental tarantula | | | | | Instances of coma reported. |
| Poecilotheria | P. fasciata ** | Sri Lankan ornamental tarantula | | | | | Instances of cardiac failure reported |
| Cheiracanthium | spp. | Yellow Sac spider | 6–10 mm | | | | one case of irreversible damage to the skin reported |
| Cheiracanthium | C. japonicum | Japanese sac spider | 6–10 mm | | | | |
| Macrothele | M. holsti, M. gigas, M. taiwanensis | Primitive burrowing spiders | | | | | No deaths reported in Taiwan. |
| Steatoda | S. grossa | Cupboard spider | | | | | Mild widow-like symptoms reported, no severe consequences Study suggests its venom can be effective in treating widow bites because of their similarity. |

* This value is based on experience with human exposures.
** Several other kinds of tarantulas in the pet trade are regarded as giving non-trivial bites. Tarantulas are typically far larger than spiders with the most toxic kinds of venom. However, the sheer volume of the venom may compensate for its lesser toxicity. The effects of a full envenomation are probably unknown for many species of tarantulas, so due caution is advisable.
