= List of Sicariidae species =

This page lists all described species of the spider family Sicariidae accepted by the World Spider Catalog as of December 2020:

== Hexophthalma ==
Hexophthalma

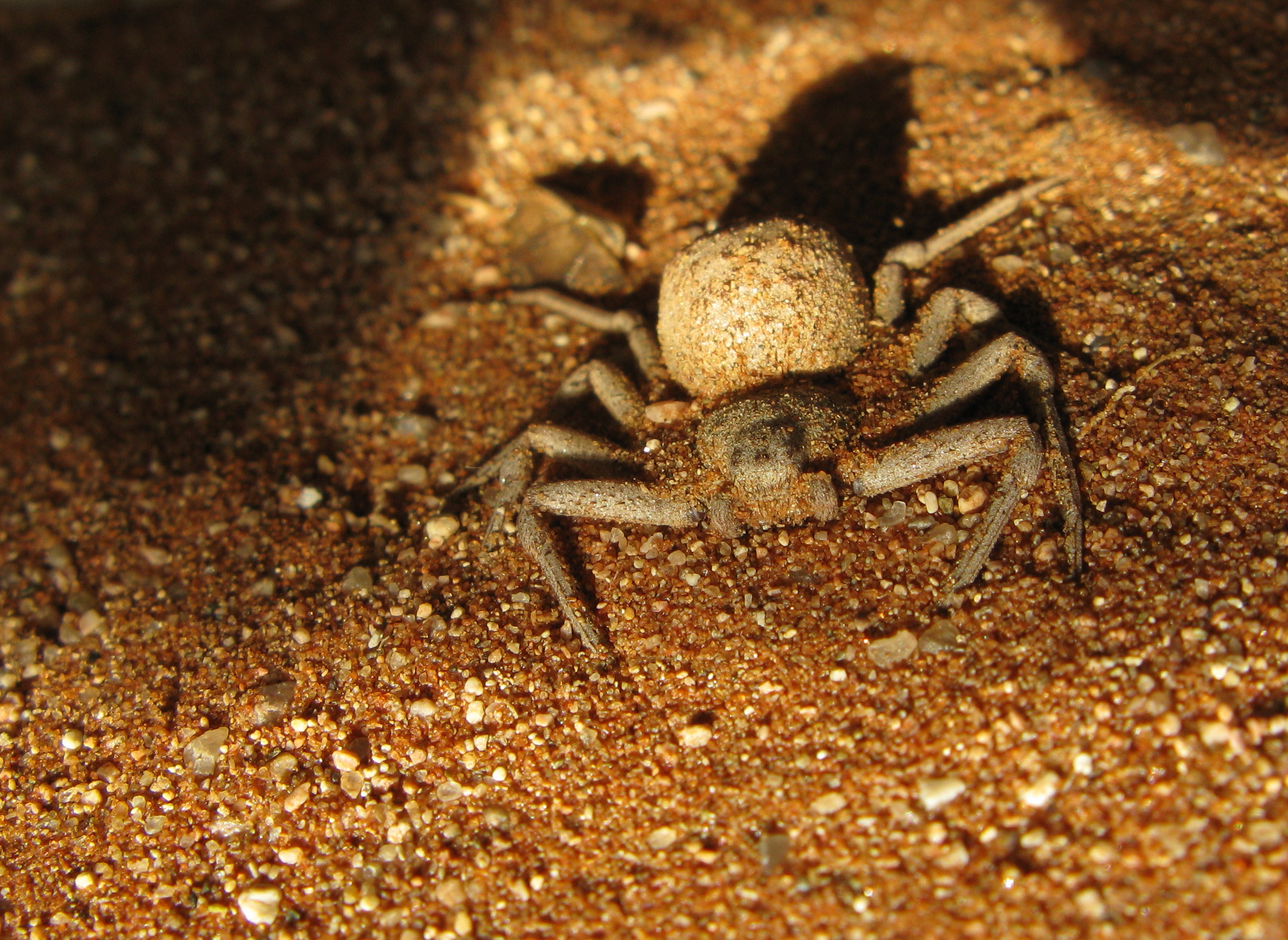
Hexophthalma sp.

Hexophthalma Karsch, 1879

- H. albospinosa (Purcell, 1908) — Namibia, South Africa
- H. binfordae Lotz, 2018 — Namibia
- H. damarensis (Lawrence, 1928) — Namibia
- H. dolichocephala (Lawrence, 1928) — Namibia
- H. goanikontesensis Lotz, 2018 — Namibia
- H. hahni (Karsch, 1878) (type) — Namibia, South Africa
- H. leroyi Lotz, 2018 — South Africa
- H. spatulata (Pocock, 1900) — South Africa

== Loxosceles ==
Loxosceles

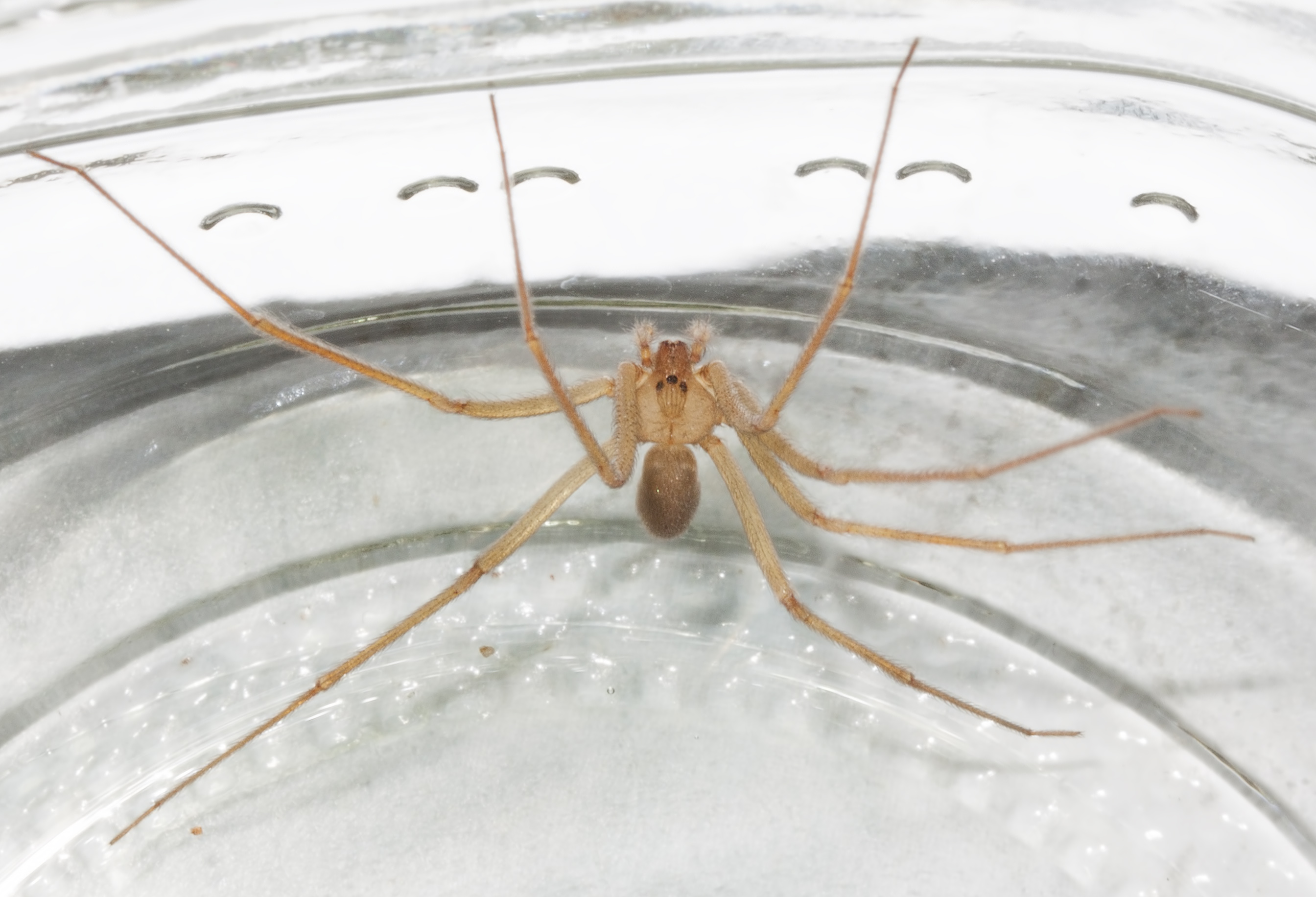
Desert recluse
(Loxosceles deserta)

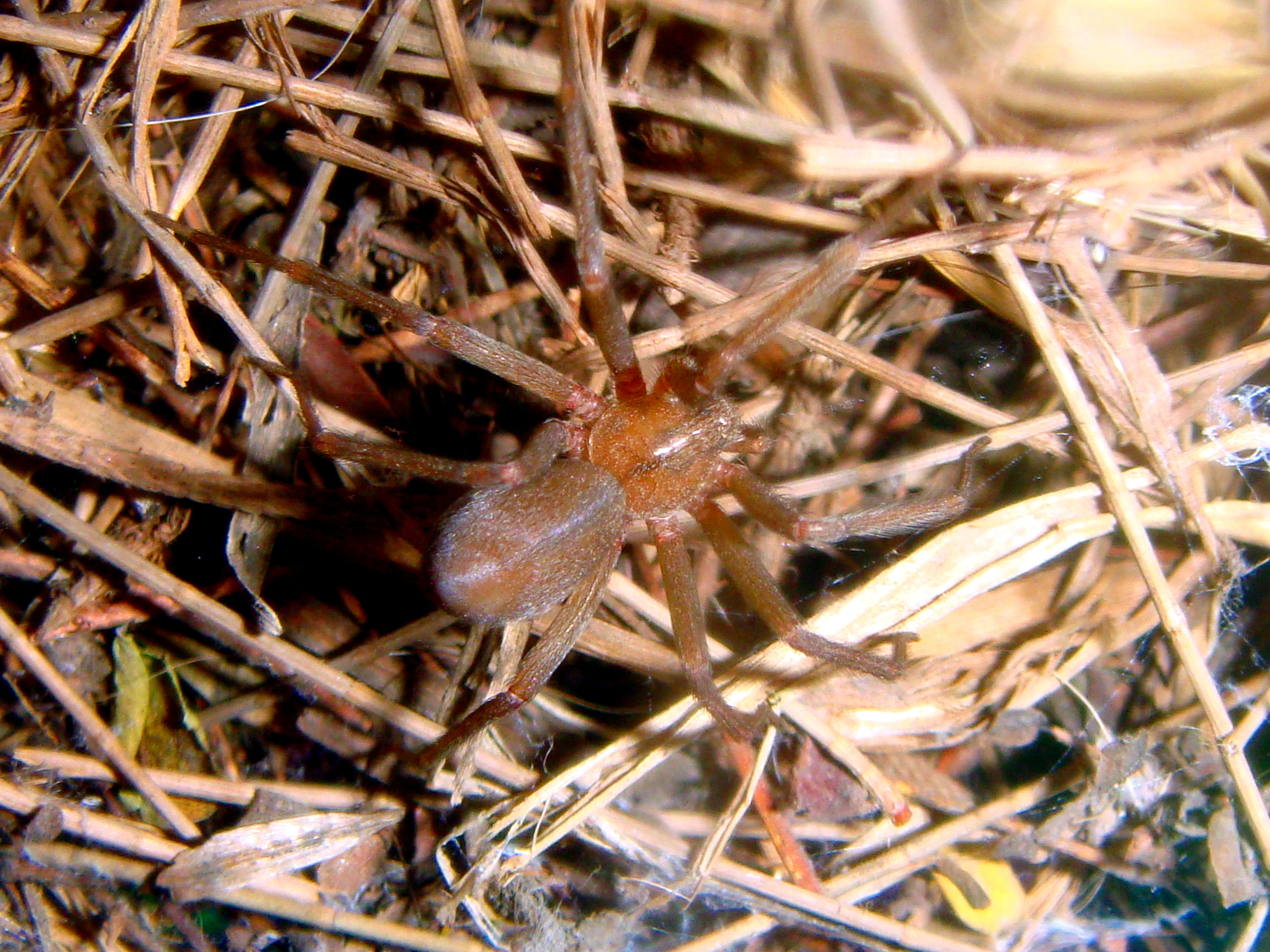
Chilean recluse spider
(Loxosceles laeta)

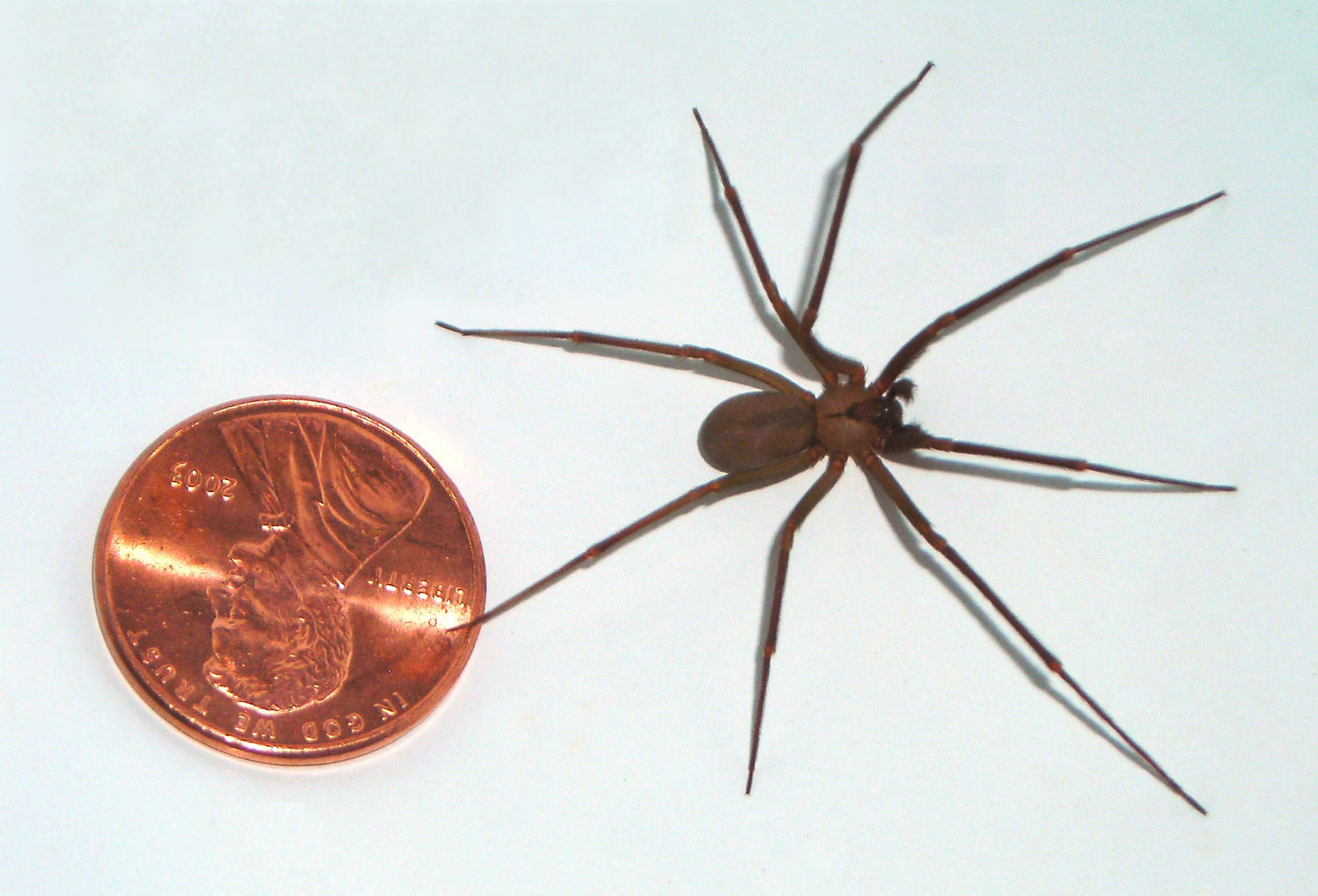
Brown recluse
(Loxosceles reclusa)

Loxosceles Heineken & Lowe, 1832

- L. accepta Chamberlin, 1920 — Peru
- L. adelaida Gertsch, 1967 — Brazil
- L. alamosa Gertsch & Ennik, 1983 — Mexico
- L. alicea Gertsch, 1967 — Peru
- L. amazonica Gertsch, 1967 — Peru, Brazil
- L. anomala (Mello-Leitão, 1917) — Brazil
- L. apachea Gertsch & Ennik, 1983 — USA, Mexico
- L. aphrasta Wang, 1994 — China
- L. aranea Gertsch, 1973 — Mexico
- L. arizonica Gertsch & Mulaik, 1940 — USA
- L. aurea Gertsch, 1973 — Mexico
- L. baja Gertsch & Ennik, 1983 — Mexico
- L. barbara Gertsch & Ennik, 1983 — Mexico
- L. belli Gertsch, 1973 — Mexico
- L. bentejui Planas & Ribera, 2015 — Canary Is.
- L. bergeri Strand, 1906 — Namibia
- L. bettyae Gertsch, 1967 — Peru
- L. blancasi Gertsch, 1967 — Peru
- L. blanda Gertsch & Ennik, 1983 — USA
- L. boneti Gertsch, 1958 — Mexico, El Salvador
- L. candela Gertsch & Ennik, 1983 — Mexico
- L. carabobensis González-Sponga, 2010 — Venezuela
- L. cardosoi Bertani, von Schimonsky & Gallão, 2018 — Brazil
- L. caribbaea Gertsch, 1958 — Greater Antilles
- L. carinhanha Bertani, von Schimonsky & Gallão, 2018 — Brazil
- L. carmena Gertsch & Ennik, 1983 — Mexico
- L. cederbergensis Lotz, 2017 — South Africa
- L. chapadensis Bertani, Fukushima & Nagahama, 2010 — Brazil
- L. chinateca Gertsch & Ennik, 1983 — Mexico
- L. colima Gertsch, 1958 — Mexico
- L. conococha Gertsch, 1967 — Peru
- L. coquimbo Gertsch, 1967 — Chile
- L. corozalensis González-Sponga, 2010 — Venezuela
- L. coyote Gertsch & Ennik, 1983 — Mexico
- L. cubana Gertsch, 1958 — Cuba, Bahama Is., Hispaniola
- L. cubiroensis González-Sponga, 2010 — Venezuela
- L. curimaguensis González-Sponga, 2010 — Venezuela
- L. dejagerae Lotz, 2017 — South Africa
- L. deserta Gertsch, 1973 — USA, Mexico
- L. devia Gertsch & Mulaik, 1940 — USA, Mexico
- L. diaguita Brescovit, Taucare-Ríos, Magalhaes & Santos, 2017 — Chile
- L. ericsoni Bertani, von Schimonsky & Gallão, 2018 — Brazil
- L. fontainei Millot, 1941 — Guinea
- L. foutadjalloni Millot, 1941 — Guinea
- L. francisca Gertsch & Ennik, 1983 — Mexico
- L. frizzelli Gertsch, 1967 — Peru
- L. gaucho Gertsch, 1967 — Brazil. Introduced to Tunisia
- L. gloria Gertsch, 1967 — Ecuador, Peru
- L. griffinae Lotz, 2017 — Namibia
- L. guajira Cala-Riquelme, Gutiérrez-Estrada & Flórez, 2015 — Colombia
- L. guatemala Gertsch, 1973 — Guatemala
- L. guayota Planas & Ribera, 2015 — Canary Is.
- L. haddadi Lotz, 2017 — South Africa
- L. harrietae Gertsch, 1967 — Peru
- L. herreri Gertsch, 1967 — Peru
- L. hirsuta Mello-Leitão, 1931 — Brazil, Paraguay, Argentina
- L. huasteca Gertsch & Ennik, 1983 — Mexico
- L. hupalupa Planas & Ribera, 2015 — Canary Is.
- L. immodesta (Mello-Leitão, 1917) — Brazil
- L. inca Gertsch, 1967 — Peru
- L. insula Gertsch & Ennik, 1983 — Mexico
- L. intermedia Mello-Leitão, 1934 — Brazil, Argentina
- L. irishi Lotz, 2017 — Namibia
- L. jaca Gertsch & Ennik, 1983 — Mexico
- L. jamaica Gertsch & Ennik, 1983 — Jamaica
- L. jarmila Gertsch & Ennik, 1983 — Jamaica
- L. julia Gertsch, 1967 — Peru
- L. kaiba Gertsch & Ennik, 1983 — USA
- L. karstica Bertani, von Schimonsky & Gallão, 2018 — Brazil
- L. lacroixi Millot, 1941 — Ivory Coast
- L. lacta Wang, 1994 — China
- L. laeta (Nicolet, 1849) — South America. Introduced to USA, Finland, Australia
- L. lawrencei Caporiacco, 1955 — Venezuela, Trinidad, Curaçao
- L. lutea Keyserling, 1877 — Colombia, Ecuador
- L. luteola Gertsch, 1973 — Mexico
- L. mahan Planas & Ribera, 2015 — Canary Is.
- L. maisi Sánchez-Ruiz & Brescovit, 2013 — Cuba
- L. makapanensis Lotz, 2017 — South Africa
- L. malintzi Valdez-Mondragón, Cortez-Roldán, Juárez-Sánchez & Solís-Catalán, 2018 — Mexico
- L. manuela Gertsch & Ennik, 1983 — Mexico
- L. maraisi Lotz, 2017 — Namibia
- L. martha Gertsch & Ennik, 1983 — USA
- L. meruensis Tullgren, 1910 — Ethiopia, Kenya, Tanzania
- L. misteca Gertsch, 1958 — Mexico
- L. mogote Sánchez-Ruiz & Brescovit, 2013 — Cuba
- L. mrazig Ribera & Planas, 2009 — Tunisia
- L. mulege Gertsch & Ennik, 1983 — Mexico
- L. muriciensis Fukushima, de Andrade & Bertani, 2017 — Brazil
- L. nahuana Gertsch, 1958 — Mexico
- L. neuvillei Simon, 1909 — Ethiopia, Somalia, East Africa
- L. niedeguidonae de Andrade, Bertani, Nagahama & Barbosa, 2012 — Brazil
- L. olivaresi González-Sponga, 2010 — Venezuela
- L. olmea Gertsch, 1967 — Peru
- L. pallalla Brescovit, Taucare-Ríos, Magalhaes & Santos, 2017 — Chile
- L. palma Gertsch & Ennik, 1983 — USA, Mexico
- L. panama Gertsch, 1958 — Panama
- L. parramae Newlands, 1981 — South Africa
- L. persica Ribera & Zamani, 2017 — Iran
- L. pilosa Purcell, 1908 — Namibia, South Africa
- L. piura Gertsch, 1967 — Peru
- L. pucara Gertsch, 1967 — Peru
- L. puortoi Martins, Knysak & Bertani, 2002 — Brazil
- L. reclusa Gertsch & Mulaik, 1940 — North America
- L. rica Gertsch & Ennik, 1983 — Costa Rica
- L. rosana Gertsch, 1967 — Peru
- L. rothi Gertsch & Ennik, 1983 — Mexico
- L. rufescens (Dufour, 1820) (type) — Southern Europe, northern Africa to Iran. Introduced to USA, Mexico, Macaronesia, South Africa, India, China, Japan, Korea, Laos, Thailand, Australia, Hawaii
- L. rufipes (Lucas, 1834) — Guatemala, Panama, Colombia. Introduced to West Africa
- L. russelli Gertsch & Ennik, 1983 — USA
- L. sabina Gertsch & Ennik, 1983 — USA
- L. sansebastianensis González-Sponga, 2010 — Venezuela
- L. seri Gertsch & Ennik, 1983 — Mexico
- L. similis Moenkhaus, 1898 — Brazil
- L. simillima Lawrence, 1927 — Southern Africa
- L. smithi Simon, 1897 — Ethiopia, Malawi, Kenya, Tanzania
- L. sonora Gertsch & Ennik, 1983 — Mexico
- L. spadicea Simon, 1907 — Peru, Bolivia, Argentina
- L. speluncarum Simon, 1893 — South Africa
- L. spinulosa Purcell, 1904 — South Africa
- L. surca Gertsch, 1967 — Peru, Chile
- L. taeniopalpis Simon, 1907 — Ecuador
- L. taino Gertsch & Ennik, 1983 — Bahama Is., Jamaica, Hispaniola
- L. tazarte Planas & Ribera, 2015 — Canary Is.
- L. tehuana Gertsch, 1958 — Mexico
- L. tenango Gertsch, 1973 — Mexico
- L. tenochtitlan Valdez-Mondragón & Navarro-Rodríguez, 2019 — Mexico
- L. teresa Gertsch & Ennik, 1983 — Mexico
- L. tibicena Planas & Ribera, 2015 — Canary Is.
- L. tlacolula Gertsch & Ennik, 1983 — Mexico
- L. tolantongo Navarro-Rodríguez & Valdez-Mondragón, 2020 — Mexico
- L. troglobia Souza & Ferreira, 2018 — Brazil
- L. valdosa Gertsch, 1973 — Mexico
- L. vallenar Brescovit, Taucare-Ríos, Magalhaes & Santos, 2017 — Chile
- L. variegata Simon, 1897 — Paraguay, Argentina
- L. virgo Gertsch & Ennik, 1983 — Virgin Is.
- L. vonwredei Newlands, 1980 — Namibia
- L. weyrauchi Gertsch, 1967 — Peru
- L. willianilsoni Fukushima, de Andrade & Bertani, 2017 — Brazil
- L. yucatana Chamberlin & Ivie, 1938 — Mexico, Belize, Guatemala
- L. zapoteca Gertsch, 1958 — Mexico
- † L. aculicaput Wunderlich, 2004
- † L. defecta Wunderlich, 1988
- † L. deformis Wunderlich, 1988

== Sicarius ==
Sicarius

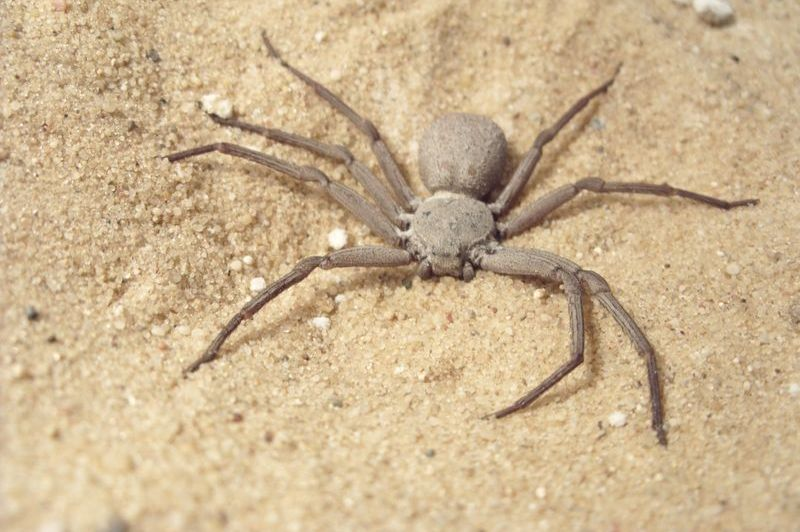
Sicarius levi, female

Sicarius Walckenaer, 1847

- S. andinus Magalhaes, Brescovit & Santos, 2017 — Peru
- S. boliviensis Magalhaes, Brescovit & Santos, 2017 — Bolivia, Peru, Brazil, Paraguay
- S. cariri Magalhaes, Brescovit & Santos, 2013 — Brazil
- S. crustosus (Nicolet, 1849) — Chile
- S. diadorim Magalhaes, Brescovit & Santos, 2013 — Brazil
- S. fumosus (Nicolet, 1849) — Chile
- S. gracilis (Keyserling, 1880) — Ecuador, Peru
- S. jequitinhonha Magalhaes, Brescovit & Santos, 2017 — Brazil
- S. lanuginosus (Nicolet, 1849) — Chile
- S. levii Magalhaes, Brescovit & Santos, 2017 — Chile, Argentina
- S. mapuche Magalhaes, Brescovit & Santos, 2017 — Argentina
- S. ornatus Magalhaes, Brescovit & Santos, 2013 — Brazil
- S. peruensis (Keyserling, 1880) — Peru
- S. rugosus (F. O. Pickard-Cambridge, 1899) — El Salvador, Nicaragua, Costa Rica
- S. rupestris (Holmberg, 1881) — Argentina
- S. saci Magalhaes, Brescovit & Santos, 2017 — Brazil
- S. thomisoides Walckenaer, 1847 (type) — Chile
- S. tropicus (Mello-Leitão, 1936) — Brazil
- S. utriformis (Butler, 1877) — Ecuador (Galapagos)
- S. vallenato Cala-Riquelme, Gutiérrez-Estrada, Flórez-Daza & Agnarsson, 2017 — Colombia
- S. yurensis Strand, 1908 — Peru, Chile
