= Phα1β =

Spider neurotoxin

Identifiers
3D model (JSmol)	Interactive image
- InChI: InChI=1S/C248H382N74O78S12/c1-14-120(6)192-240(393)301-152(88-129-44-21-18-22-45-129)215(368)283-142(52-29-36-80-255)209(362)308-170-113-411-412-117-174(243(396)322-85-41-57-177(322)244(397)320-83-39-55-175(320)238(391)271-101-183(334)277-160(103-323)225(378)303-161(104-324)226(379)293-148(86-119(4)5)200(353)269-102-185(336)316-192)315-218(371)151(90-131-60-64-134(328)65-61-131)296-232(385)168-111-407-410-116-173-237(390)319-195(127(13)326)242(395)302-159(97-191(347)348)223(376)299-158(96-190(345)346)224(377)312-167-110-406-405-109-166(230(383)286-139(49-26-33-77-252)204(357)279-136(46-23-30-74-249)202(355)275-126(12)246(399)400)307-208(361)141(51-28-35-79-254)282-210(363)146(68-72-187(339)340)287-205(358)138(48-25-32-76-251)280-203(356)137(47-24-31-75-250)281-206(359)143(54-38-82-267-248(263)264)285-220(373)156(94-181(260)332)298-233(386)169-112-404-402-107-164(229(382)300-157(95-189(343)344)222(375)297-155(93-180(259)331)221(374)288-145(211(364)309-168)66-70-178(257)329)278-184(335)100-270-201(354)163(106-401-409-115-172(305-196(349)123(9)256)236(389)318-194(122(8)16-3)245(398)321-84-40-56-176(321)239(392)290-135(53-37-81-266-247(261)262)199(352)268-99-182(333)276-144(67-71-186(337)338)213(366)317-193(121(7)15-2)241(394)314-173)306-235(388)171(310-212(365)147(289-231(167)384)69-73-188(341)342)114-408-403-108-165(313-227(380)162(105-325)304-234(170)387)228(381)274-125(11)197(350)291-153(91-132-98-265-118-272-132)214(367)273-124(10)198(351)292-154(92-179(258)330)219(372)284-140(50-27-34-78-253)207(360)294-150(89-130-58-62-133(327)63-59-130)216(369)295-149(217(370)311-169)87-128-42-19-17-20-43-128/h17-22,42-45,58-65,98,118-127,135-177,192-195,323-328H,14-16,23-41,46-57,66-97,99-117,249-256H2,1-13H3,(H2,257,329)(H2,258,330)(H2,259,331)(H2,260,332)(H,265,272)(H,268,352)(H,269,353)(H,270,354)(H,271,391)(H,273,367)(H,274,381)(H,275,355)(H,276,333)(H,277,334)(H,278,335)(H,279,357)(H,280,356)(H,281,359)(H,282,363)(H,283,368)(H,284,372)(H,285,373)(H,286,383)(H,287,358)(H,288,374)(H,289,384)(H,290,392)(H,291,350)(H,292,351)(H,293,379)(H,294,360)(H,295,369)(H,296,385)(H,297,375)(H,298,386)(H,299,376)(H,300,382)(H,301,393)(H,302,395)(H,303,378)(H,304,387)(H,305,349)(H,306,388)(H,307,361)(H,308,362)(H,309,364)(H,310,365)(H,311,370)(H,312,377)(H,313,380)(H,314,394)(H,315,371)(H,316,336)(H,317,366)(H,318,389)(H,319,390)(H,337,338)(H,339,340)(H,341,342)(H,343,344)(H,345,346)(H,347,348)(H,399,400)(H4,261,262,266)(H4,263,264,267)/t120-,121-,122-,123-,124-,125-,126-,127+,135-,136-,137-,138-,139-,140-,141-,142-,143-,144-,145-,146-,147-,148-,149-,150-,151-,152-,153-,154-,155-,156-,157-,158-,159-,160-,161-,162-,163-,164-,165-,166-,167-,168-,169-,170-,171-,172-,173-,174-,175-,176-,177-,192-,193-,194-,195-/m0/s1 Key: QGMVGSCZYUDILO-FPHUJEMDSA-N
- SMILES: N[C@@]([H])(C)C(=O)N[C@@]([H])(CS7)C(=O)N[C@@]([H])([C@]([H])(CC)C)C(=O)N1[C@@]([H])(CCC1)C(=O)N[C@@]([H])(CCCNC(=N)N)C(=O)NCC(=O)N[C@@]([H])(CCC(=O)O)C(=O)N[C@@]([H])([C@]([H])(CC)C)C(=O)N[C@@]([H])(CS2)C(=O)N[C@@]([H])([C@]([H])(O)C)C(=O)N[C@@]([H])(CC(=O)O)C(=O)N[C@@]([H])(CC(=O)O)C(=O)N[C@@]([H])(CS3)C(=O)N[C@@]([H])(CCC(=O)O)C(=O)N[C@@]([H])(CS4)C(=O)N[C@@]([H])(CS7)C(=O)NCC(=O)N[C@@]([H])(CS5)C(=O)N[C@@]([H])(CC(=O)O)C(=O)N[C@@]([H])(CC(=O)N)C(=O)N[C@@]([H])(CCC(=O)N)C(=O)N[C@@]([H])(CS2)C(=O)N[C@@]([H])(Cc1ccc(O)cc1)C(=O)N[C@@]([H])(CS6)C(=O)N1[C@@]([H])(CCC1)C(=O)N1[C@@]([H])(CCC1)C(=O)NCC(=O)N[C@@]([H])(CO)C(=O)N[C@@]([H])(CO)C(=O)N[C@@]([H])(CC(C)C)C(=O)NCC(=O)N[C@@]([H])([C@]([H])(CC)C)C(=O)N[C@@]([H])(Cc1ccccc1)C(=O)N[C@@]([H])(CCCCN)C(=O)N[C@@]([H])(CS6)C(=O)N[C@@]([H])(CO)C(=O)N[C@@]([H])(CS4)C(=O)N[C@@]([H])(C)C(=O)N[C@@]([H])(CC1=CN=C-N1)C(=O)N[C@@]([H])(C)C(=O)N[C@@]([H])(CC(=O)N)C(=O)N[C@@]([H])(CCCCN)C(=O)N[C@@]([H])(Cc1ccc(O)cc1)C(=O)N[C@@]([H])(Cc1ccccc1)C(=O)N[C@@]([H])(CS5)C(=O)N[C@@]([H])(CC(=O)N)C(=O)N[C@@]([H])(CCCNC(=N)N)C(=O)N[C@@]([H])(CCCCN)C(=O)N[C@@]([H])(CCCCN)C(=O)N[C@@]([H])(CCC(=O)O)C(=O)N[C@@]([H])(CCCCN)C(=O)N[C@@]([H])(CS3)C(=O)N[C@@]([H])(CCCCN)C(=O)N[C@@]([H])(CCCCN)C(=O)N[C@@]([H])(C)C(=O)O

Properties
Chemical formula	C_{248}H_{382}N_{74}O_{78}S_{12}
Molar mass	6032.94 g·mol^{−1}

Related compounds
Related compounds	PnTx3-4, PLTX-II, ω-Aga-IIIA, ICK-OtTx-1A, DW-13.3
- Except where otherwise noted, data are given for materials in their standard state (at 25 °C [77 °F], 100 kPa). Infobox references

Phα1β (also known as PnTx3-6; PhTx3-6; Phalpha1beta) is a peptide toxin that blocks various types of voltage-gated calcium channels (VGCCs) and is a specific receptor antagonist of the TRPA1 cation channel. The peptide is derived from the venom of the armed spider Phoneutria nigriventer and possesses wide-ranging analgesic and anti-nociceptive effects in animal models.

== Source and Etymology ==
Phα1β is purified from the venom of Phoneutria nigriventer, commonly known as the “armed spider”. A recombinant peptide (CTK 01512-2) has been synthesized. CTK 01512-2 showed a level of efficacy and potency equivalent to Phα1β.

== Chemistry ==
Phα1β (PhTx3-6) is the sixth isoform of the PhTx3 neurotoxin, with a mature peptide of 55 amino acids, including 12 cysteines. These cysteines form six disulfide bonds that contribute to the peptide's stable tertiary structure. The molecular mass, calculated from its mature amino acid sequence, is approximately 6045.03 Da.

The following sequence represents the mature peptide's amino acid sequence.

ACIPRGEICT DDCECCGCDN QCYCPPGSSL GIFKCSCAHA NKYFCNRKKE KCKKA

== Target and mode of action ==
The peptide reversibly blocks a variety of voltage-gated calcium channels (VGCCs), including N-type (Cav2.2), R-type (Cav2.3), P/Q-type (Cav2.1), and L-type (Cav1.2) channels, with varying potencies that correspond to IC50 values of 122, 136, 263, and 607 nM, respectively. It induces a complete blockade of N-type-based currents and an incomplete blockade of R-, P/Q- and L-type-based currents. The exact mechanism by which Phα1β influences the functional properties of these ion channels remains unclear. However, it has been suggested that the peptide blocks VGCCs by physically occluding the pore, which could account for its varying effects across this family of channels. Furthermore, the toxin acts as a specific TRPA1 antagonist. Its affinity within this context has not yet been accurately determined.

== Toxicity ==
Phα1β possesses wide-ranging analgesic and anti-nociceptive effects in animal models, that can be attributed to its modulatory action on VGCCs and TRPA1 receptors. Furthermore, it is known to be effective at doses that induce little to no side effects in animal models. While Phoneutria nigriventer venom is highly neurotoxic and can cause a range of symptoms that may include agitation, hypertension, perspiration, excessive salivation, nausea, profuse vomiting, lacrimation, somnolence, tachycardia, tachypnea, spasms, tremors, and priapism, the toxicity of Phα1β has not been sufficiently characterized to provide estimates of its LD50 or specific side effects.

== Therapeutic use ==
Phα1β exhibits anti-nociceptive effects by inhibiting pro-nociceptive glutamate release induced by influx of calcium ions (Ca^{2+}) or by inhibiting TRPA1 channels.

The cell bodies of sensory nerves, which are involved in neurogenic or inflammatory conditions, are primarily located in the Dorsal Root Ganglia (DRG). Phα1β attenuates the pain response by targeting synaptic transmission in these neurons in the following two ways.

=== 1. Nociceptive modulation by voltage-gated calcium channels (VGCCs) ===
Nociception is modulated by VGCCs. Upon activation of L, N, and P/Q type VGCCs in response to painful stimuli, glutamate is released. N-type channels (Cav2.2) respond most potently to painful stimuli. Thus, they are central to analgesic research as they constitute the primary source of Ca2+ influx, and are upregulated in response to chronic pain. Phα1β inhibits N-type channels, resulting in a decrease of glutamate influx and consequently reduced pain perception.

=== 2. Nociceptive modulation by non-selective cation channels ===
Phα1β also affects the signal transmission of sensory neurons by targeting TRPA1 channels, which are non-selective cation channels predominantly found in the DRG. TRPA1 channels constitute a major pain conduction pathway. Phα1β acts as an antagonist for TRPA1, effectively inhibiting the calcium responses induced by TRPA1 agonists such as allyl isothiocyanate (AITC).

Compared to similar toxins (MVIIA, which is a ω-conotoxin), Phα1β has a significantly wider therapeutic index, no evident side effects in controlled settings in animal models, and longer-lasting analgesic effects. Phα1β achieves maximum pain relief comparable to other analogs (MVIIA), with a higher effective dose (ED50) and lower inhibitory dose (ID50), indicating enhanced safety and potency at lower concentrations. Importantly, Phα1β has the potential to prevent and reverse chronic pain conditions, such as those induced by complete Freund’s adjuvant (CFA), and alleviate symptoms of allodynia and hyperalgesia. Additionally, its analgesic and anti-inflammatory properties could also be utilized for pain treatment in cancer patients. Interestingly, Phα1β also appears to mitigate or even prevent symptoms in a mouse model of Huntington’s Disease, where it may exhibit neuroprotective effects and improve motor performance.

Phα1β is potentially useful for the treatment of various pain conditions, including acute and chronic inflammatory or neuropathic pain. Additionally, its potential may extend to neurodegenerative diseases such as Huntington's disease. Studies in human subjects would be required to explore its broader therapeutic applications and efficacy across different neurological conditions.
