= Phoneutria bahiensis =

Scientific classification
- Domain: Eukaryota
- Kingdom: Animalia
- Phylum: Arthropoda
- Subphylum: Chelicerata
- Class: Arachnida
- Order: Araneae
- Infraorder: Araneomorphae
- Family: Ctenidae
- Genus: Phoneutria
- Species: P. bahiensis

Binomial name
- Phoneutria bahiensis Simó & Brescovit, 2001

Species of spider

Phoneutria bahiensis is a species of spider in the family Ctenidae, found in Brazil. It is known in Brazilian Portuguese as armadeira da Bahia (Bahia armed spider).

== Description and behavior ==
Phoneutria bahiensis can reach 3.5 cm in body length and 14 cm with leg-span. P. bahiensis is very similar in appearance to Phoneutria fera and Phoneutria reidyi: its anterior flat lobe is convex while much more distinct in P. fera, and poorly developed in P. reidyi. The pedipalps are dorsally dark brown, with the retrolateral face of the patella and tibia with barn bands. The opistosome is dorsally dark brown, with yellow-orange bristles. The ventral part is dark brown with four series of light yellow spots. In males, the tibia is equal to or greater than the cambium, and the plunger is straight with a slightly curved tip. The males also have a reduced retrolateral tibial apophysis of the pedipalp. The coloration of the males is similar to that of the females, except for the exchange with a median longitudinal orange band. The cheliceras of the females are dark brown with yellow bristles.

Phoneutria bahiensis is usually found on top of trees in the Atlantic Forest. It is carnivorous, feeding on insects, other spiders, frogs, lizards, and small mice. Like other wandering spiders it does not use webs to hunt, instead actively hunting on the forest floor. It attacks and uses a paralyzing toxin to immobilize its prey. Unlike other wandering spiders, P. bahiensis is rarely aggressive.

== Distribution and habitat ==
This species is endemic to Brazil, being found in the Atlantic Forest from the south of Bahia to the north of Espírito Santo.

== Danger ==
Although not much is known about this species, it is venomous and should be treated with caution. Out of 12 reported bites, 5 developed heart failure. (See Pathophysiology of spider bites).
