= U24-ctenitoxin-Pn1a =

Neurotoxin

U24-ctenitoxin-Pn1a (or U24-CNTX-Pn1a) is a neurotoxin that is naturally found in the venom of Latrodectus geometricus (L. geometricus). It reduces the inactivation of insect voltage-gated sodium channels. It is also thought to be a cysteine proteinase inhibitor.

== Etymology ==
The term ‘ctenitoxin’ in U24-ctenitoxin-Pn1a refers to toxins found in the venom of spiders from the Ctenidae family. ‘Pn’ is an acronym for Phoneutria nigriventer referring to the genus and species of the animal it was first isolated from. An alternative name for U24-ctenitoxin-Pn1a is “Venom protein PN16C3”.

== Source ==
U24-ctenitoxin-Pn1a is naturally found in the venom of Latrodectus geometricus, often referred to as the brown widow spider or brown button spider. The spider genus Latrodectus is found worldwide in pantropical and subtropical regions and is considered one of the most dangerous spider genera to humans and animals. Its venom contains latrotoxins, which are the main neurotoxins in the venom.

== Chemistry ==
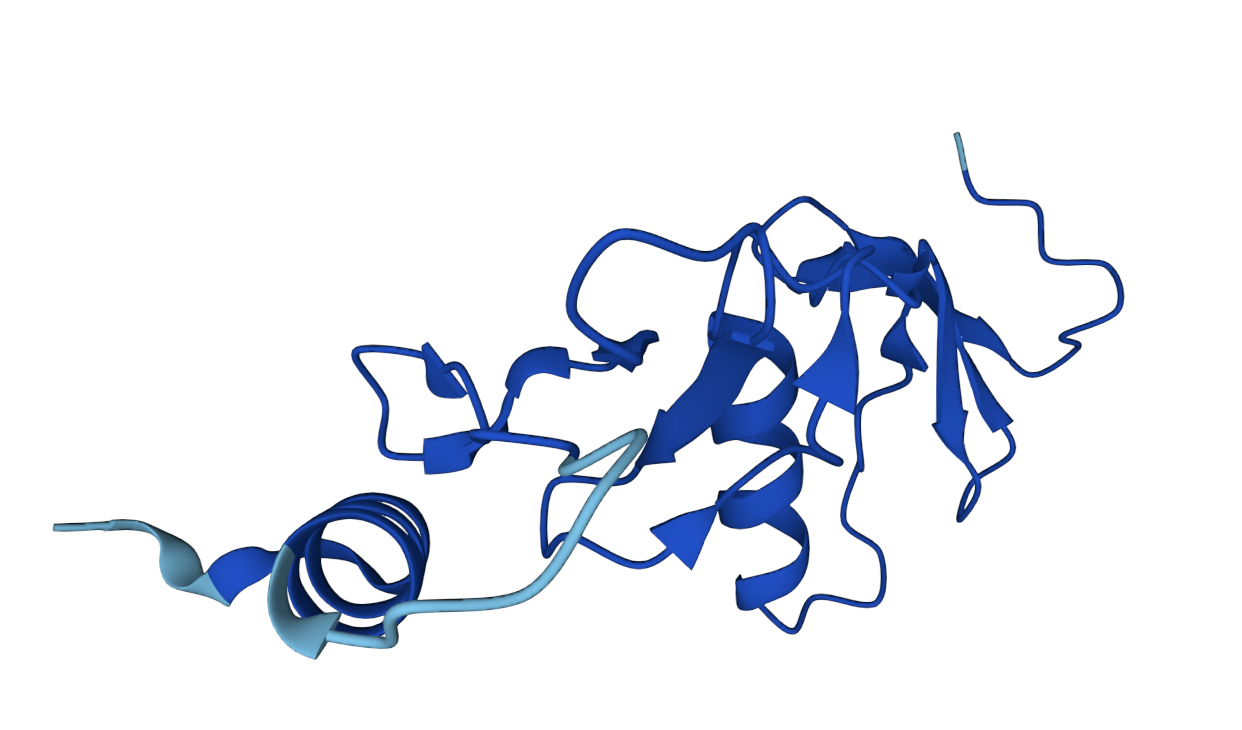
3D Structure of the U24-ctenitoxin-Pn1a protein

=== Structure ===
U24-ctenitoxin-Pn1a is a 128 amino acid protein. The amino acid sequence of the mature protein is:

  1 ARPKSDCEKH RESTEKTGTI MKLIPKCKEN SDYEELQCYE DSKFCVCYDK 50 
 51 KGHAASPIST KVKECGCYLK QKERKDSGRE SAIIPQCEED GKWAKKQLWE 100
101 FNKSCWCVDE KGEQVGKIHH DCDSLKCE 128

The molecular mass of U24-ctenitoxin-Pn1a is 14,778 Da.

=== Family ===
U24-ctenitoxin-Pn1a belongs to the ctenitoxin family. Ctenitoxins consist of two repeats of thyroglobulin type I domain (Thyroglobulin type-1 1 and Thyroglobulin type-1 2) and a signal peptide. Based on the presence of the thyroglobulin domains, U24-ctenitoxin-Pn1a and other members of ctenitoxin family, are thought to inhibit the activity of cysteine proteinases. Ctenitoxins, in general, also inhibit BgNa_{v} as well as the arachnid channel of Varroa destructor (VdNa_{v}1).

== Target and molecular mechanism ==
U24-ctenitoxin-Pn1a, purified from L.geometricus venom, reduces the inactivation of the insect voltage-gated sodium channels of Blatella germanica (BgNa_{v}) and Drosophila melanogaster (DmNa_{v}) expressed in Xenopus laevis oocytes.

== Toxicity ==
The neurotoxic peptides of the L.geometricus venom target the voltage-gated ion channels of both vertebrates and invertebrates. The effect of U24-ctenitoxin-Pn1a is in line with the effect of another toxin from the ctenitoxin family, PnTx2-1 (δ-Ctenitoxin-Pn1a). Both of these toxins slow down the inactivation of insect voltage-gated sodium channels; this may lead to paralysis or mortality of the insects.

== Therapeutic use ==
In general, since spider toxins influence the functioning of the nervous system, they are examined as a possible influence for therapeutic leads or bioinsecticides. The function of U24-ctenitoxin-Pn1a on altering ion channel activity has indicated that it can be viewed as a source for bioinsecticidal peptides.
