= Phoneutria keyserlingi =

Scientific classification
- Kingdom: Animalia
- Phylum: Arthropoda
- Subphylum: Chelicerata
- Class: Arachnida
- Order: Araneae
- Infraorder: Araneomorphae
- Family: Ctenidae
- Genus: Phoneutria
- Species: P. keyserlingi

Binomial name
- Phoneutria keyserlingi (F.O. P-Cambridge, 1897)

Species of spider

Phoneutria keyserlingi is a species of spiders in the family Ctenidae, found in Brazil.

P. keyserlingi is venomous and should be treated with caution, studies on the other Phoneutria are scarce, however, a recent characterization of the venom of this species has shown that it contains neurotoxins similar to those isolated from Phoneutria nigriventer and that are active on the neuronal ion (Ca^{2+}, Na^{+} and K^{+}) channels and NMDA-type glutamate receptors. CRISP-1 is a protein (basically an allergen) from the cysteine-rich P. keyserlingi venom, proteins in the CAP domain that includes CRISP have also been recruited from cephalopods, cone snails, scorpions, reptiles and ticks, the proteins in the domain CAP are allergy-inducing toxins, although their role in spider toxins has yet to be determined, CRISP-1 is known to induce a dangerous allergic reaction in humans.

== See also ==
- Ion channel
  - Calcium channel (Ca^{2+})
  - Sodium channel (Na^{+})
  - Potassium channel (K^{+})
