= Tx2-6 =

Toxin, contained in the venom of the Brazilian wandering spider

Tx2-6 is a toxin found in the venom of the Brazilian wandering spider, Phoneutria nigriventer (Keyserling). It is a peptide of 48 residues, molecular weight 5291.3. This peptide is cleaved from a longer precursor with a signal peptide and a glutamine-rich propeptide. It can cause priapism. Tests on rats indicate that the toxin causes nitric oxide release, and its effect on erection is blocked by the nitric oxide synthase inhibitor L-NAME. However, it fully restored erectile function in rats developing hypertension due to injection of deoxycorticosterone acetate. A study is underway at the Medical College of Georgia looking at possible uses for the chemical in erectile dysfunction medication. Scientists and Gregory Ochs (Dobbs 2) are collaborating on this study.

== See also ==
- Pharmacology
- Spiders
