= Phoneutria depilata =

Scientific classification
- Kingdom: Animalia
- Phylum: Arthropoda
- Subphylum: Chelicerata
- Class: Arachnida
- Order: Araneae
- Infraorder: Araneomorphae
- Family: Ctenidae
- Genus: Phoneutria
- Species: P. depilata

Binomial name
- Phoneutria depilata (Strand, 1909)

Species of spider

Phoneutria depilata is a species of spider in the family Ctenidae, found in Central America.

== Description and behavior ==
Adult females reach a body length that can be about 4 inches and can have a stride length of more than 10 centimeters. Males are smaller. Carapace brown with a longitudinal black line. Ocular area with brown setae and back oblique band from PLE to anterior dorsal shield of prosoma edge. The chelicerae brown with reddish setae. Sternum endites and labium yellowish-brown dorsally, with yellow dots, ventrally dark brown with four conspicuous series of yellow dots.

P. depilata is an euryphagous predator with a broad diet made up predominantly of arthropods and to a lesser extent of small vertebrates (Gekkonidae, Hylidae and Sphaerodactylidae).

The range of eggs per egg sac is 430–1300, and spiderlings emerge 28–34 days after the egg sacs are produced. Sexual maturity occurs after 14–17 molts, and spiders mature 300–465 days after emerging from the egg sac.

== Distribution and habitat ==
This species is found in disturbed habitats associated with both dry and humid tropical forests (0-1700), usually on the ground with sparse litter and low vegetation. It's found in Ecuador, Colombia, Panama, Costa Rica, Nicaragua, Honduras and Guatemala.

== Bites ==
There are human bite records of this species reported in Costa Rica and banana plantations in Colombia. All occurred with adults, and most of them have presented mild to moderate symptoms, with only one presenting severe symptoms such as renal failure.

The transcriptome analysis showed a significant number of neurotoxins, which affect mainly sodium and calcium ion channels. Enzymes such as serine proteases, metalloproteases, cholinesterases and hyaluronidases, that could explain some effects during envenomation.
