= Phoneutria eickstedtae =

Scientific classification
- Domain: Eukaryota
- Kingdom: Animalia
- Phylum: Arthropoda
- Subphylum: Chelicerata
- Class: Arachnida
- Order: Araneae
- Infraorder: Araneomorphae
- Family: Ctenidae
- Genus: Phoneutria
- Species: P. eickstedtae

Binomial name
- Phoneutria eickstedtae Martins & Bertani, 2007

Species of spider

Phoneutria eickstedtae is a species of spider in the family Ctenidae, found in Brazil.
