= PhTx-2 =

PhTx-2 is a toxic fraction of the venom of the Brazilian wandering spider Phoneutria nigriventer.

== Target ==
This fraction is responsible for most of the venom's effects, acts on voltage-gated ion channels, and is composed of nine different peptides, of which PhTx-2-5 and PhTx-2-6 activate voltage-gated ion channels. PhTx-2 has been shown to be related to the activation and delay of inactivation of neuronal sodium channels, leading to an increase in the concentration of neuronal Ca++ and the release of glutamate, resulting in the release of neurotransmitters such as acetylcholine and catecholamines. Primates are more sensitive to the PhTx-1 & 2 components than in the case of mice, about 4 to 5 times more sensitive. The LD50 for a 70kg adult human is 6.3 mg, but the spider has only 1-2 mg and usually delivers 0.4 mg.
