= Phoneutria pertyi =

Scientific classification
- Domain: Eukaryota
- Kingdom: Animalia
- Phylum: Arthropoda
- Subphylum: Chelicerata
- Class: Arachnida
- Order: Araneae
- Infraorder: Araneomorphae
- Family: Ctenidae
- Genus: Phoneutria
- Species: P. pertyi

Binomial name
- Phoneutria pertyi (F.O. P-Cambridge, 1897)

Species of spider

Phoneutria pertyi is a species of spiders in the family Ctenidae, found in Brazil.

P. pertyi is very similar to P. nigriventer and P. eickstedtae, females have several basal grooves in the epiginal lateral apophysis, while they are absent in P. nigriventer. The maschos have the longest tibial pedipalp, or similar in length to the cambium, and the curved hook-shaped apex of the emboli. The dorsal shield of the prossoma is reddish-brown with golden bristles, the ocular area has light gray bristles and a dark brown oblique band, to the anterior dorsal shield on the edge of the prossoma. The cheliceras are dark brown with golden-yellow and white setae, a light brown sternum. The tibia pediplapo is dorsally brown with a golden median longitudinal stripe, retrolateral face with white stripe legs I and IV yellowish brown. Dorsally golden optosome, with dark-stained walls longitudinally in the median region, ventrally yellowish brown with or without a dark brown transverse band near the epihgastric groove, and four more conspicuous white lines in the posterior half of the opistogosome, area close to the rows with two dark brown side bands.

P. nigriventer is the most studied species, studies on other species are scarce, but it has been reported to contain 296 unique sequences and 61 sequences that corresponded to peptide toxins rich in putative cysteines, other putative components of the venom such as protease, defensins and serine proteases were identified, glycine-rich proteins (GRP) were also identified, a class of venom component never described for the genus Phoneutria. Eight sequences of cysteine-rich toxins are considered to be new toxins from P. pertyi.
