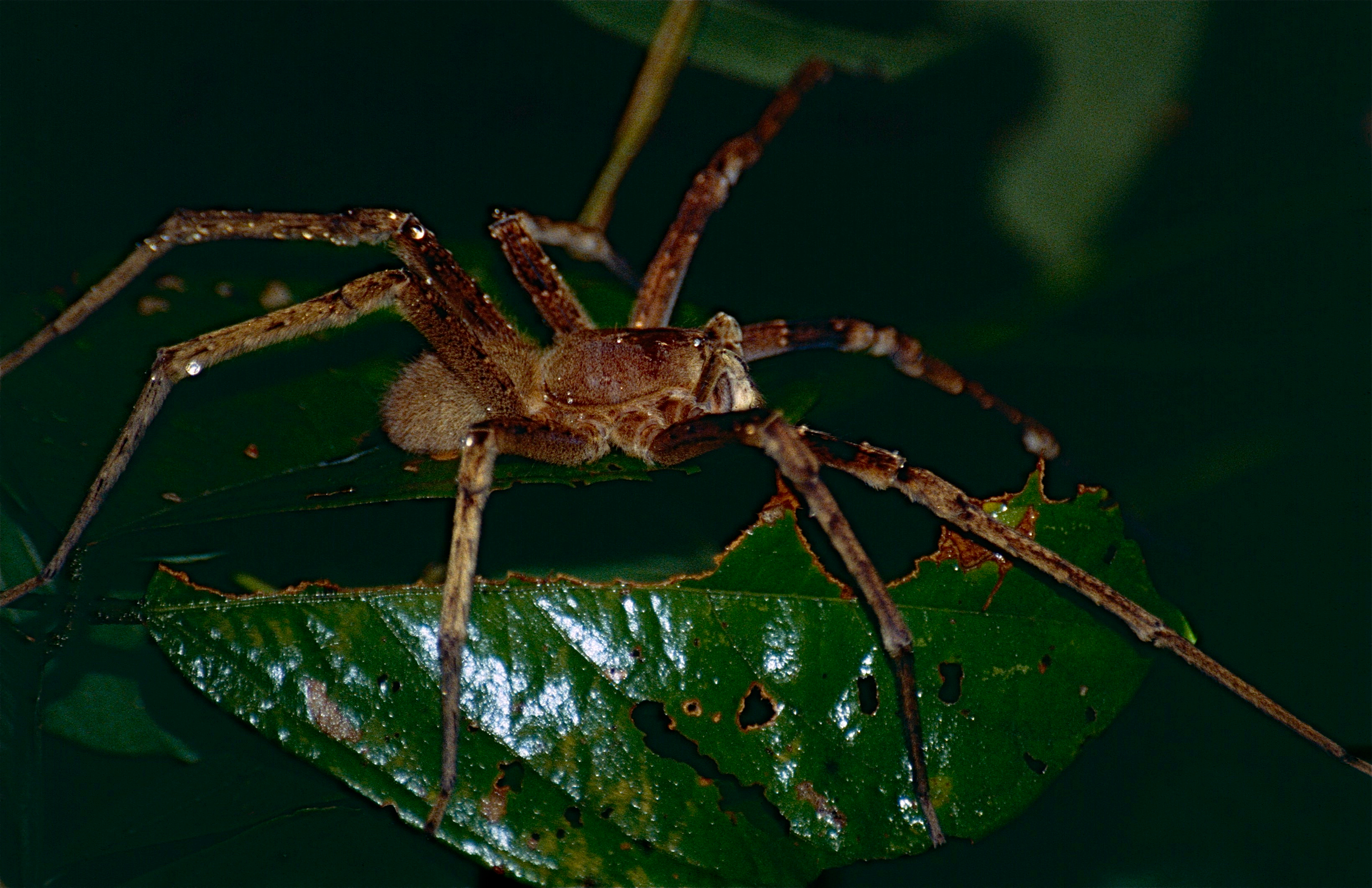
- P. fera from French Guiana

Scientific classification
- Kingdom: Animalia
- Phylum: Arthropoda
- Subphylum: Chelicerata
- Class: Arachnida
- Order: Araneae
- Infraorder: Araneomorphae
- Family: Ctenidae
- Genus: Phoneutria
- Species: P. fera

Binomial name
- Phoneutria fera Perty, 1833

Synonyms
- Ctenus ferus (Perty, 1833); Ctenus sus Strand, 1909

= Phoneutria fera =

Species of spider

Phoneutria fera is a species of spider with medically significant venom in the family Ctenidae found in South America (Colombia, Ecuador, Peru, Brazil, Suriname, and Guyana). It is commonly known as the Brazilian wandering spider and the banana spider, although these names are applied to other species in the genus Phoneutria, particularly Phoneutria nigriventer. P. fera tends to spend a larger amount of time in vegetation during the early period of its life and spends more time on the ground once it becomes larger. This is more common in females, since they are usually larger than males. Medical records from within the geographic range of P. fera show bites (likely from P. fera or its close relative P. reidyi), have the potential to develop moderate to severe systematic reactions in humans.

== Taxonomy ==
The name Phoneutria fera meaning "murderess, wild animal" is of both Greek and Latin origin. The genus Phoneutria derives from the Greek φονεύτρια, meaning "murderess", and the species fera which is derived from the Latin term "ferus" (also written as "feros") meaning "wild animal". The species P. fera is native to the northern portion of South America in the Amazon of Brazil, Venezuela, Ecuador, Peru and the Guyanas.
