= Hexophthalma leroyi =

Scientific classification
- Kingdom: Animalia
- Phylum: Arthropoda
- Subphylum: Chelicerata
- Class: Arachnida
- Order: Araneae
- Infraorder: Araneomorphae
- Family: Sicariidae
- Genus: Hexophthalma
- Species: H. leroyi

Binomial name
- Hexophthalma leroyi Lotz, 2018

Species of spider

Hexophthalma leroyi is a species of spider in the family Sicariidae. It is endemic to South Africa.

== Distribution ==
Hexophthalma leroyi is known only from the Northern Cape province of South Africa at Augrabies National Park at 635 m above sea level.

== Habitat and ecology ==
The species is a free-running ground dweller collected in a grassy area in the Nama Karoo biome.

== Conservation ==
Hexophthalma leroyi is listed as Data Deficient due to taxonomic reasons. The species is known only from the type locality and the status remains obscure. More sampling is needed to collect males and determine the species' range. The species is protected in Augrabies National Park.

== Taxonomy ==
The species was described by Leon N. Lotz in 2018 from Augrabies National Park. It is known only from the female, with males remaining to be discovered.
