= Hexophthalma albospinosa =

Namibian Six-eyed Sand Spider

Conservation status
- Least Concern (SANBI Red List)

Scientific classification
- Kingdom: Animalia
- Phylum: Arthropoda
- Subphylum: Chelicerata
- Class: Arachnida
- Order: Araneae
- Infraorder: Araneomorphae
- Family: Sicariidae
- Genus: Hexophthalma
- Species: H. albospinosa

Binomial name
- Hexophthalma albospinosa (Purcell, 1908)

Synonyms
- Sicarius albospinosus Purcell, 1908

Species of spider

Hexophthalma albospinosa is a species of spider in the family Sicariidae. It is endemic to southern Africa and is commonly known as the Namibian six-eyed sand spider.

== Distribution ==
Hexophthalma albospinosa occurs in Namibia and South Africa. In South Africa, it is recorded only from the Northern Cape province at Bloeddrift, west of Arnisfont in the Richtersveld at 357 m above sea level.

== Habitat and ecology ==
The species inhabits the Desert biome where it is found beneath stones in sandy areas, buried in sand. It is a free-living ground dweller that has the ability to stay beneath the soil surface for long periods.

== Description ==
The body size ranges from 8-11 mm for both males and females. The color of body and legs varies between light brown, reddish brown, dark brown or grey. The carapace is about as wide as long, with one or multiple rows of macro-setae on lateral borders. The dorsal macro-setae are arranged in a central group surrounded by 4-5 pairs of macro-setae lines. Six eyes are arranged in three diads with anterior median eyes absent. The labium is longer than wide, tapering distally and partially fused to the sternum. The chelicerae are fused at the base.

The abdomen is rounded, slightly truncate posteriorly, with 3-6 paired transversal rows of macro-setae. Leg femora are covered on the dorsal surface by macro-setae, the tibia has eight rows of pointed macro-setae, and the tarsus lacks an onychium.

== Conservation ==
Hexophthalma albospinosa is listed as Least Concern by the South African National Biodiversity Institute due to its wide geographical range in southern Africa, despite its limited range within South Africa.

== Etymology ==
The specific name albospinosa is Latin, meaning "with white spines".

== Taxonomy ==
The species was originally described by W.F. Purcell in 1908 as Sicarius albospinosus from Namibia. It was later transferred to the genus Hexophthalma by Magalhães et al. in 2017. The species has been revised by Lotz (2012, 2018) and is known from both sexes.
