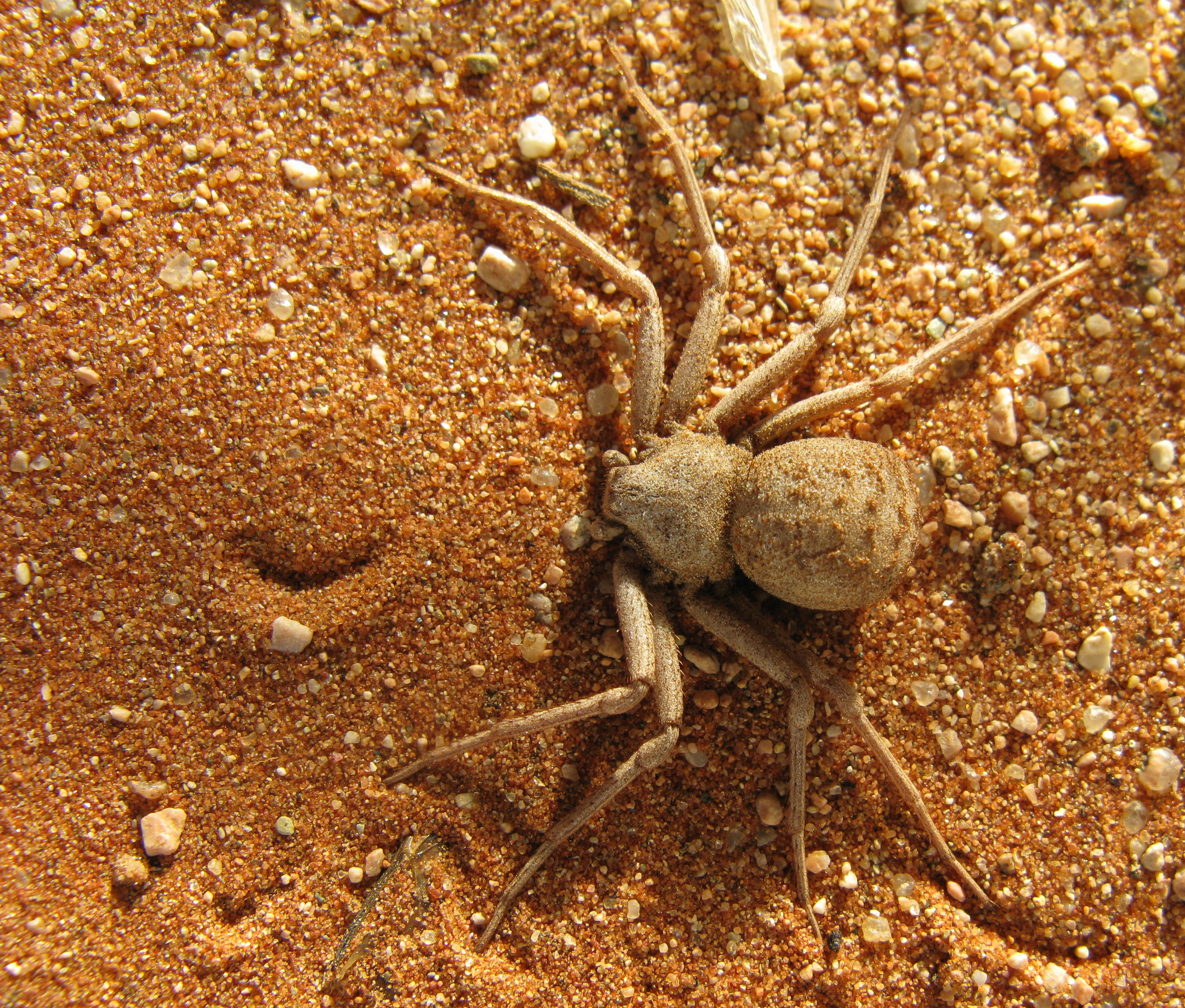
- Hexophthalma sp. from coastal Namibia

Scientific classification
- Kingdom: Animalia
- Phylum: Arthropoda
- Subphylum: Chelicerata
- Class: Arachnida
- Order: Araneae
- Infraorder: Araneomorphae
- Family: Sicariidae
- Genus: Hexophthalma; Karsch, 1879

Diversity
- 8 species

= Hexophthalma =

Six-eyed Sand Spiders

Genus of spiders

Hexophthalma is a southern African genus of spiders in the family Sicariidae. The English name six-eyed sand spiders is used for members of the genus, particularly Hexophthalma hahni.

Species in the genus have dermonecrotic venom, and can potentially cause serious or even life-threatening wounds.

== Distribution ==
Hexophthalma is endemic to southern Africa, having been found only in Namibia, South Africa and Zimbabwe.

== Life style ==
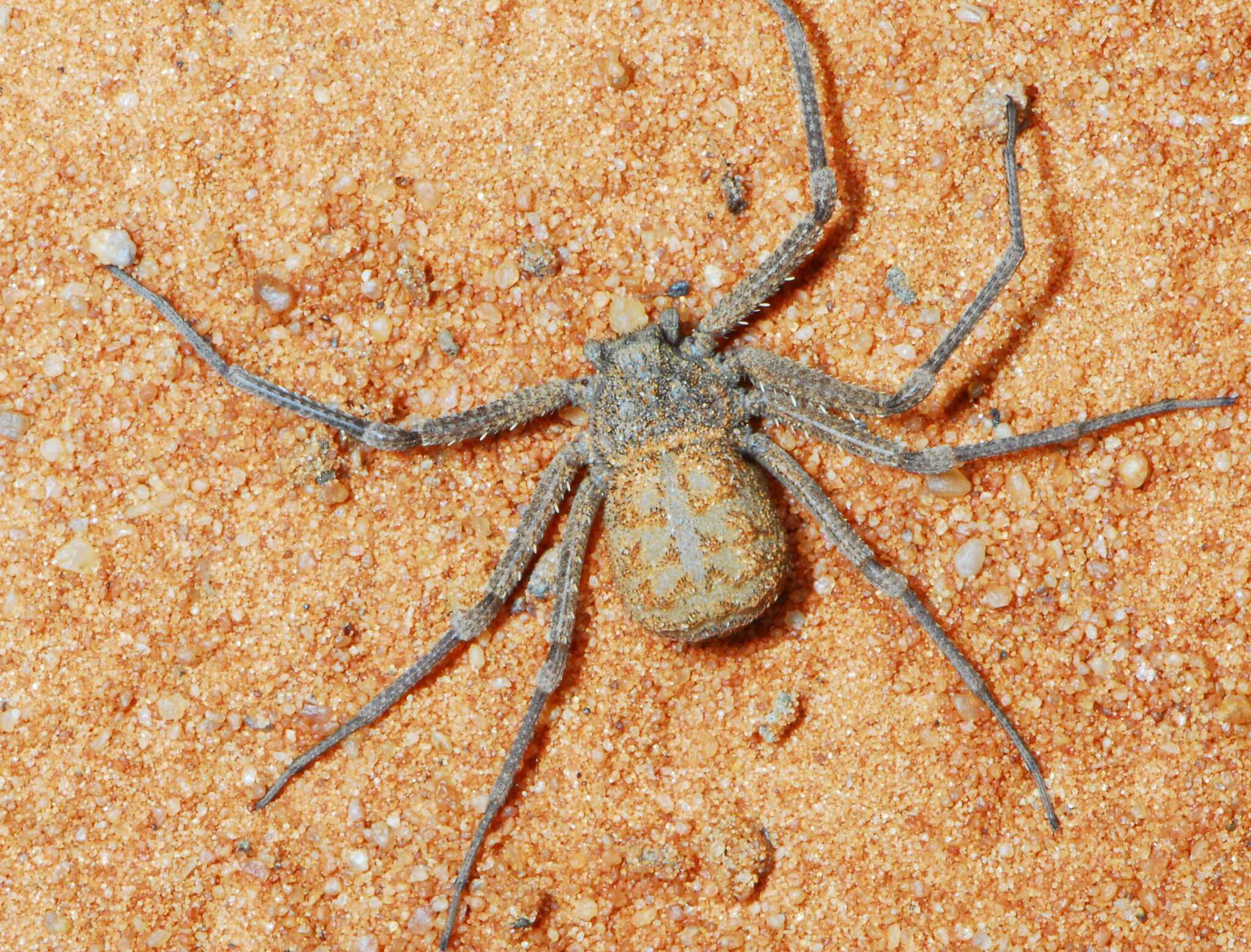
H. hahni

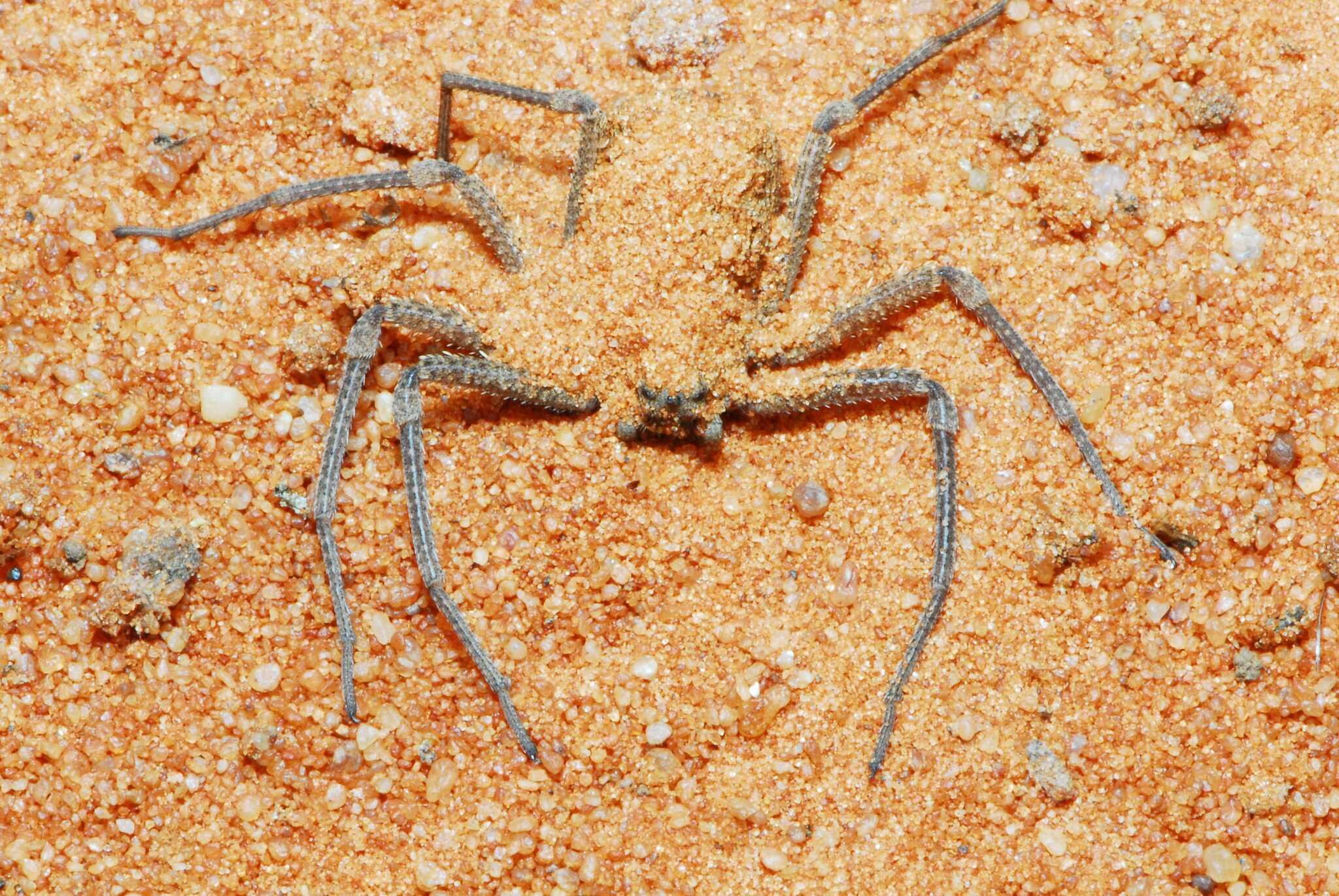

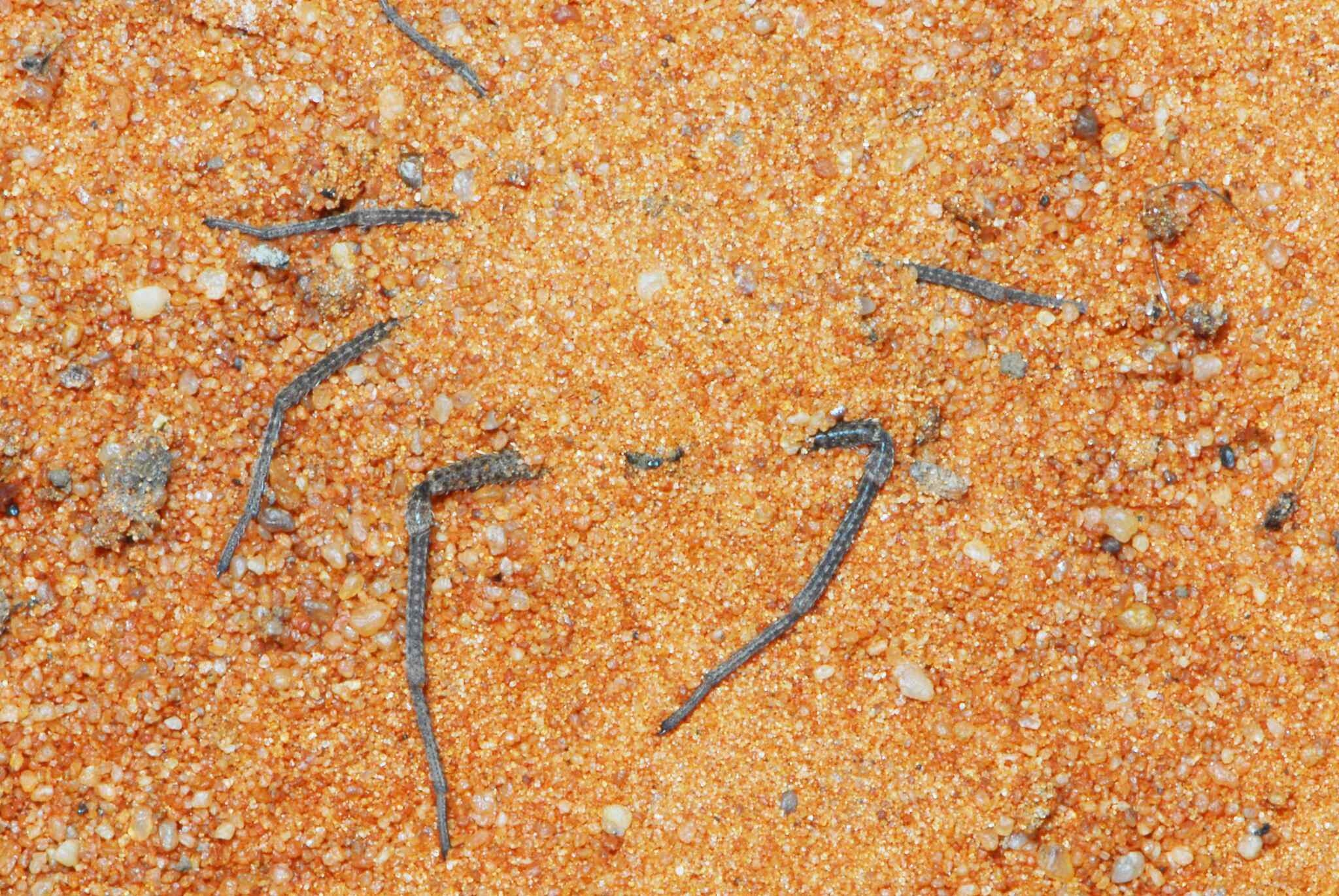

Species of Hexophthalma are free-living ground dwellers that have the ability to stay for long periods beneath the soil surface. With the help of their legs, sand is rapidly thrown over their bodies, enabling them to completely disappear beneath the surface. The tufts of sickle-shaped setae on their abdomen and legs help in holding the sand covering in place.

Only during mating are males more active and aggressive, roaming around above ground in search of a mate. The egg cocoon is cup-like in shape and is buried in the sand.

== Description ==
Body size ranges 8-11 mm for both males and females. Colour of body and legs varies from light brown, reddish brown, dark brown or grey. The carapace is about as wide as long, with one or multiple rows of macro-setae on lateral borders. Dorsal macro-setae are arranged in a central group surrounded by 4-5 pairs of macro-setae lines. The six eyes typical for the family are arranged in three diads with anterior median eyes absent.

The labium is longer than wide, tapering distally and partially fused to the sternum. The chelicerae are fused at the base. The sternum is wider than long, posteriorly truncate, with three outer rows of longer macro-setae near the border and shorter macro-setae in the middle. The abdomen is rounded, slightly truncate posteriorly, with 3-6 paired transversal rows of macro-setae.

Leg femora are covered on the dorsal surface by macro-setae. The tibia has eight rows of pointed macro-setae and the tarsus lacks an onychium.

== Taxonomy ==
The genus was first created in 1878 by Ferdinand Karsch as Hexomma, with the sole species Hexomma hahni. By 1879, though, Karsch had realized that this name had already been used in 1877 for a genus of harvestmen, so he published the replacement name Hexophthalma.

In 1893, Eugène Simon transferred Hexophthalma hahni to the genus Sicarius, and Hexophthalma fell out of use, until a phylogenetic study in 2017 showed that the African species of Sicarius, including Sicarius hahni, were distinct, and revived the genus Hexophthalma for them.

Hexophthalma is one of three genera in the family Sicariidae, as of July 2018. It is placed in the same subfamily, Sicariinae, as Sicarius:

- Sicariidae
  - Loxoscelinae
    Loxosceles
  - Sicariinae
    - Hexophthalma
    - Sicarius

=== Species ===
Two new species were added to the genus in 2018, and one previously accepted species, H. testacea, was synonymized with H. hahnii. The number of species is expected to increase with further study. H. spatulata differs in a number of respects from other species in the genus, which thus may not be monophyletic.

As of September 2025, this genus includes eight species:

- Hexophthalma albospinosa (Purcell, 1908) – Namibia, South Africa
- Hexophthalma binfordae Lotz, 2018 – Namibia
- Hexophthalma damarensis (Lawrence, 1928) – Namibia
- Hexophthalma dolichocephalus (Lawrence, 1928) – Namibia
- Hexophthalma goanikontesensis Lotz, 2018 – Namibia
- Hexophthalma hahni (Karsch, 1878) – Namibia, Zimbabwe, South Africa (type species)
- Hexophthalma leroyi Lotz, 2018 – South Africa
- Hexophthalma spatulata (Pocock, 1900) – South Africa

== Venom ==
Species of Hexophthalma produce venom that can have necrotic (dermonecrotic) effects, capable of causing serious or even life-threatening wounds, particularly if the wound becomes infected or the venom spreads in the body. The necrotic effects are caused by a family of proteins related to sphingomyelinase D, present in the venom of all sicariid spiders. In this respect, the genus resembles Loxosceles, the recluse spiders.

However, most Hexophthalama species have only been studied in vitro, and the detailed effects of their venom in humans and other vertebrates are unknown. One case was officially confirmed in South America in 1992, in a 17-year-old who developed a dermonecrotic lesion. There are two suspected cases in Africa, for which the spider has not been identified; however, according to the victim's description, the culprit could be Hexophthalma spatulata. One of the two victims lost his arm due to extensive tissue necrosis.
