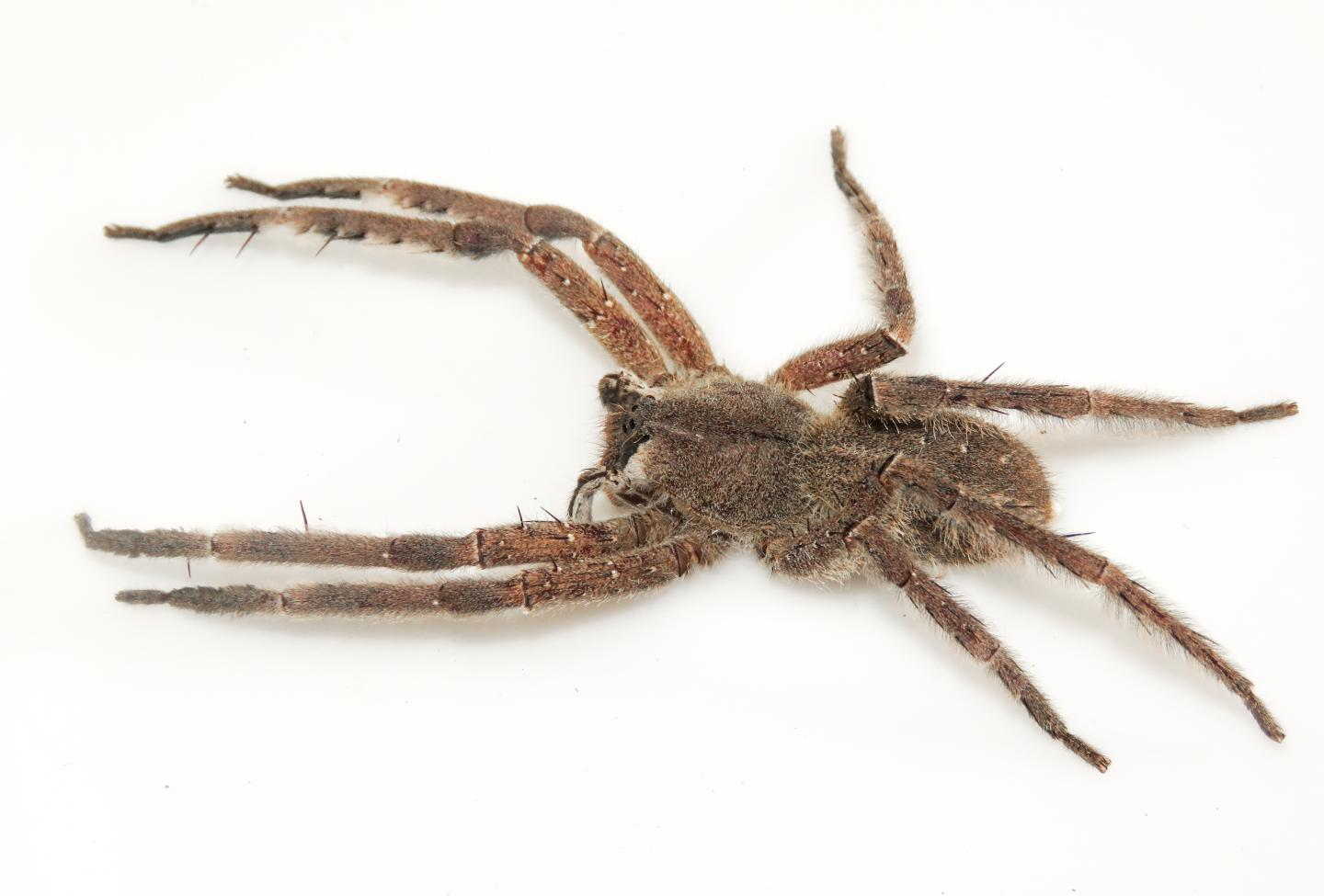
- In the Peruvian Amazon

Scientific classification
- Kingdom: Animalia
- Phylum: Arthropoda
- Subphylum: Chelicerata
- Class: Arachnida
- Order: Araneae
- Infraorder: Araneomorphae
- Family: Ctenidae
- Genus: Phoneutria
- Species: P. boliviensis

Binomial name
- Phoneutria boliviensis (F.O. P-Cambridge, 1897)

= Phoneutria boliviensis =

Species of spider

Phoneutria boliviensis is a species of a medically significant spider in the family Ctenidae found in tropical areas of Central and South America.

== Characteristics ==
Males

Males have a varied color. The prosoma, legs and sternum are brown, and the opisthosoma is dark. Males grow from 30 to 35 mm in length.

Females

The females are slightly larger, growing up to 30-40 mm in length, with a yellowish to brownish brown prosoma. There are clipped lateral black lines, a thin longitudinal black band and yellow bands dorsally on the pedipalp. The opisthosoma is dorsally yellowish, with a bright yellow-brownish pair of beams. The ventral part of the opisthosoma varies from gold to yellow with two sharp brown spots and two white spots. The chelicerae vary from red to reddish-brown. The legs have two small yellow spots dorsally and thin black transverse stripes.

== Distribution and habitat ==
Phoneutria boliviensis lives in both Central and South America. In South America it can be seen in Bolivia, Paraguay, Peru, Ecuador, Brazil and Colombia. They are also found in habitats associated with dry and humid tropical forests, usually in soil with little waste.

== Reproduction ==
Females lay up to 4 egg sacks, with 430-1,300 spiderlings hatching after 28-34 days. Reproductive behavior consists of the male riding on the female, showing a typical copulation position of modern wandering spiders.
