= Phoneutria nigriventer toxin-3 =

Broad-spectrum calcium channel blocker

Phoneutria nigriventer toxin-3 is more commonly referred to as PhTx3.

The PhTx3 neurotoxin is a broad-spectrum calcium channel blocker that inhibits glutamate release, calcium uptake and also glutamate uptake in synaptosomes. Currently, it is known to naturally occur only in the venom of the spider Phoneutria nigriventer, also known as the Brazilian Wandering spider.

== Studies ==
Many studies have been done on this neurotoxin, including one regarding its effect on the release of 3H-acetylcholine, and one comparing the effect with other toxins used by Phoneutria nigriventer.

Another study made the following claims:

NEUROTOXINS can help the understanding of mechanisms involved in neurotransmission. We here report that two neurotoxin isoforms, Tx3-3 and Tx3-4 obtained from the venom of the spider Phoneutria nigriventer inhibited the 45 Ca^{2+} influx in rat cortical synaptosomes induced by the scorpion venom tityustoxin. The IC_{50} for Tx3-3 and Tx3-4 were 0.32 and 7.9 nM, respectively. The neurotoxins Tx3-3 and Tx3-4 are very effective in inhibiting 45 Ca^{2+} influx and they should be useful in studies involving Ca^{2+}-dependent processes.

A study done at the Universidade Federal de Minas Gerais stated this:

The toxic fraction, Phoneutria nigriventer toxin-3 (PhTx3), abolished Ca^{2+}-dependent glutamate release, but did not alter Ca^{2+}-independent secretion of glutamate when rat brain cortical synaptosomes were depolarized with 33 mM KCl. This effect was most likely due to interference with the entry of calcium through voltage-gated calcium channels, because PhTx3 reduced by 50% the increase in intrasynaptosomal free calcium induced by membrane depolarization, and did not affect the release of glutamate evoked by a calcium ionophore (ionomycin). A polypeptide (Tx3-3) present in the PhTx3 fraction reproduced the effects of the PhTx3 fraction on transmitter release and intrasynaptosomal free calcium in the low nanomolar range. We compared the alterations produced by the Tx3-3 with the actions of toxins known to block calcium channels coupled to exocytosis: the results indicated that the Tx3-3 inhibition of glutamate release and intrasynaptosomal calcium resemble that observed with w-conotoxin MVIIC. We suggest that the Tx3-3 is a calcium-channel antagonist that blocked glutamate exocytosis.
