= Hexophthalma spatulata =

Conservation status
- Least Concern (SANBI Red List)

Scientific classification
- Kingdom: Animalia
- Phylum: Arthropoda
- Subphylum: Chelicerata
- Class: Arachnida
- Order: Araneae
- Infraorder: Araneomorphae
- Family: Sicariidae
- Genus: Hexophthalma
- Species: H. spatulata

Binomial name
- Hexophthalma spatulata (Pocock, 1900)

Synonyms
- Sicarius spatulatus Pocock, 1900

Species of spider

Hexophthalma spatulata is a species of spider in the family Sicariidae. It is endemic to South Africa.

== Distribution ==
Hexophthalma spatulata is known from two provinces in South Africa, the Eastern Cape and Western Cape. It occurs at altitudes ranging from 4 to 756 m above sea level.

== Habitat and ecology ==
The species is a free-living ground dweller found in the Fynbos biome.

== Conservation ==
Hexophthalma spatulata is listed as Least Concern by the South African National Biodiversity Institute due to its wide geographical range. The species is protected in Addo Elephant National Park, De Hoop Nature Reserve and Kammanasie Nature Reserve.

== Taxonomy ==
The species was originally described by Reginald Innes Pocock in 1900 as Sicarius spatulatus from Port Elizabeth. It was later transferred to the genus Hexophthalma by Magalhães et al. in 2017. The species has been revised by Lotz (2012, 2018) and Magalhães et al. (2017) and is known from both sexes.
