= Phoneutria reidyi =

Scientific classification
- Kingdom: Animalia
- Phylum: Arthropoda
- Subphylum: Chelicerata
- Class: Arachnida
- Order: Araneae
- Infraorder: Araneomorphae
- Family: Ctenidae
- Genus: Phoneutria
- Species: P. reidyi

Binomial name
- Phoneutria reidyi (F.O. P-Cambridge, 1897)

Species of spider

Phoneutria reidyi is a species of venomous spiders in the family Ctenidae, found in South America (Colombia, Venezuela, Peru, Brazil and Guyana).

This species is characterized by a double dark dorsal band on the palp, white spots in the abdominal dorsal pattern, the female anterior legs ventrally have a yellow femur, while in males it is very dark. Like other Phoneutria, P. reidyi is venomous and should be treated with caution, its venom has a median lethal dose of 0.11 mg / kg.
