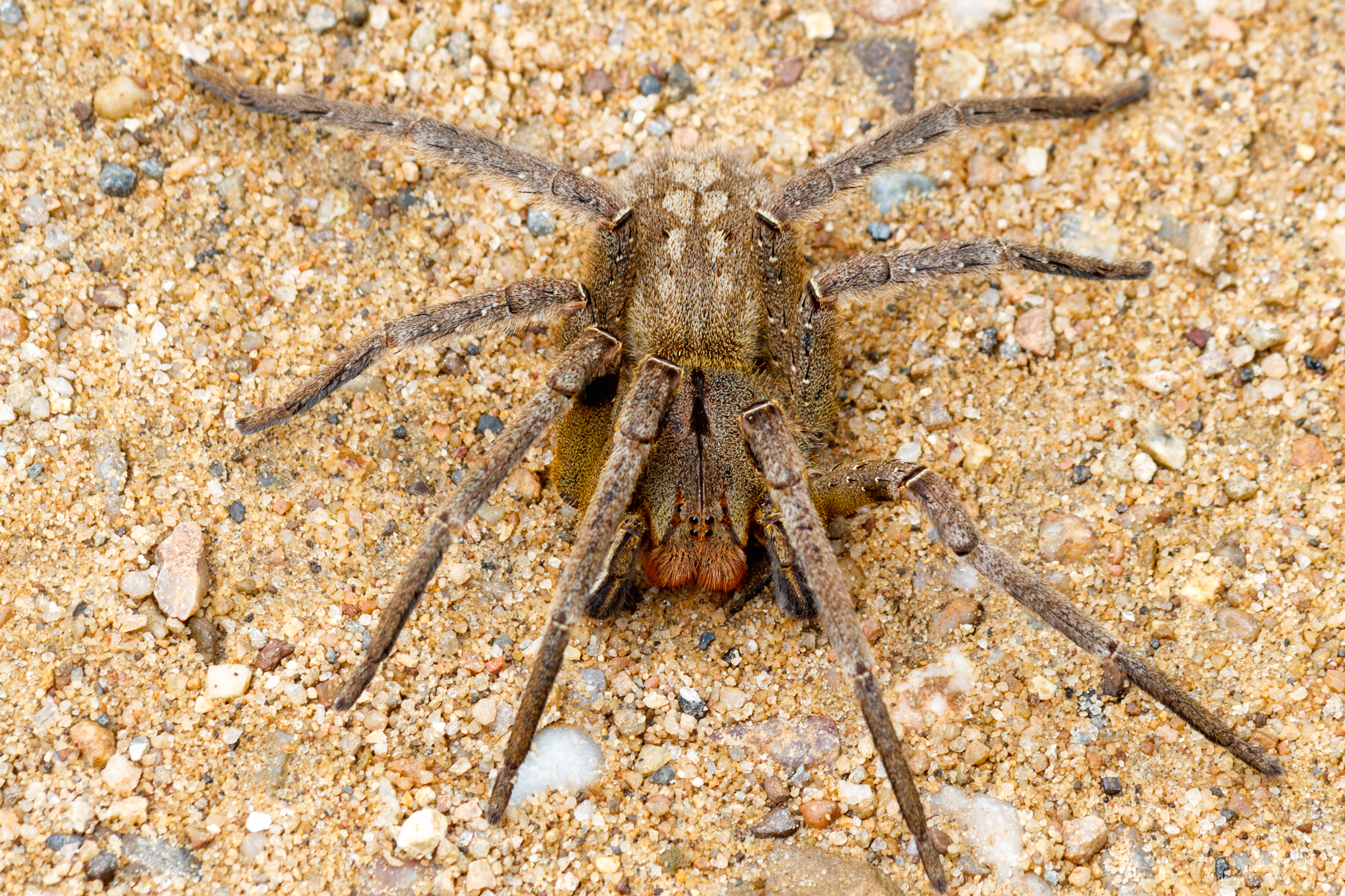
- Phoneutria nigriventer

Scientific classification
- Kingdom: Animalia
- Phylum: Arthropoda
- Subphylum: Chelicerata
- Class: Arachnida
- Order: Araneae
- Infraorder: Araneomorphae
- Family: Ctenidae
- Genus: Phoneutria; Perty, 1833

Type species
- Phoneutria fera Perty, 1833

Species
- See text

Diversity
- 9 species

= Phoneutria =

Genus of spiders

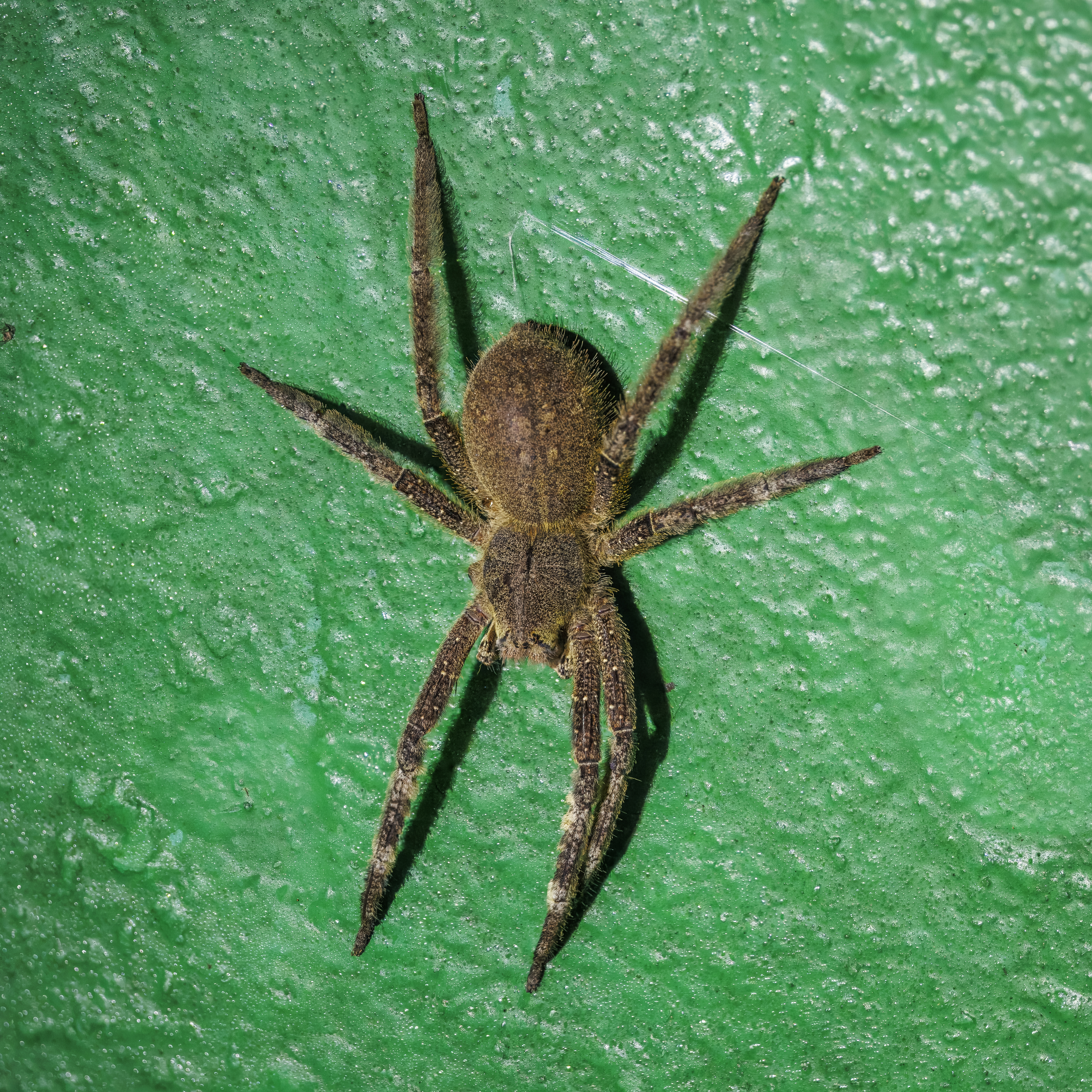
in Ecuador

Phoneutria is a genus of spiders in the family Ctenidae. They are mainly found in northern South America, with one species in Central America. Members of the genus are commonly referred to as Brazilian wandering spiders. Other English names include armed spiders (armadeiras in Brazilian Portuguese) and banana spiders (a name shared with several others).

== Description ==
The spiders in the genus can grow to have a leg span of 13 to 18 cm (5 to 7 in). Their body length ranges from 17 to 48 mm (43/64 to 1 57/64 in). While some other araneomorph spiders have a longer leg span, the largest Phoneutria species have the longest body and the greatest body weight in this group. The genus is distinguished from other related genera such as Ctenus by the presence of dense prolateral scopulae (a dense brush of fine hairs) on the pedipalp tibiae and tarsi in both sexes. Phoneutria are easily confused with several other non-medically significant ctenids, especially Cupiennius, in which the recently described C. chiapanensis also has bright red hairs on the chelicerae. Additionally, some Phoneutria species lack red hairs on the chelicerae, making it an unreliable identification feature. The presence of a dark linear stripe or stripes on the frontal (dorsal) palps and the presence of a single thin black line running anterior-posterior along the dorsal carapace may help identify Phoneutria. Other features are the strong ventral marking on the underside of the legs with contrasting dark mid-segments and lighter joints, and the pattern on the ventral (underside) of the abdomen with several rows of black dots, or an overall reddish color.

The characteristic defensive posture with frontal legs held high is an excellent indicator to confirm a specimen is Phoneutria, especially alongside correct color patterns. During the defensive display the body is lifted into an erect position, the first two pairs of legs are lifted high (revealing the conspicuous black/light-banded pattern on the leg underside), while the spider sways from side to side with hind legs in a cocked position.

== Taxonomy ==
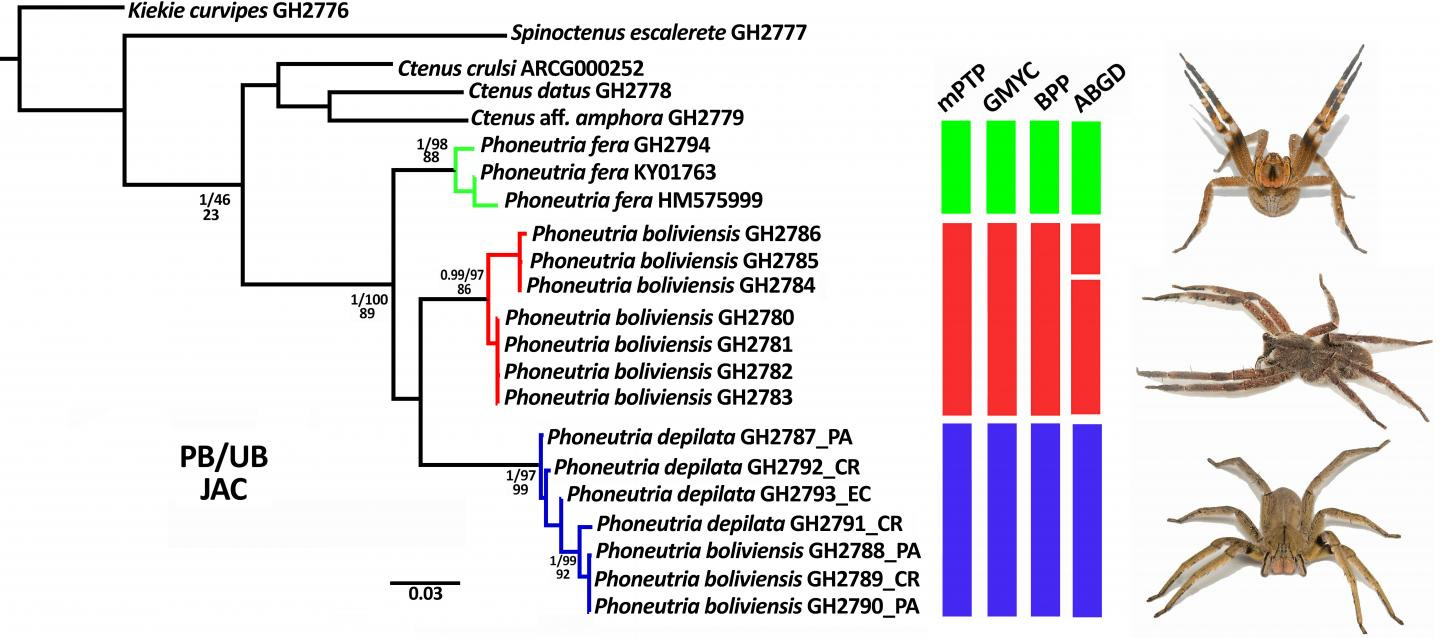
Rooted genetic evolutionary tree of the banana spiders genus Phoneutria and relatives. Some P. depilata specimens appear to be misinterpreted as P. boliviensis (blue color). Credit N. Hazzi (2021).

The genus Phoneutria was started by Maximilian Perty in 1833. The genus name is from the Greek φονεύτρια, meaning "murderess". Perty placed two species in the genus: Phoneutria rufibarbis and Phoneutria fera. The former is treated as a nomen dubium; the latter is the type species of the genus.

=== Species ===
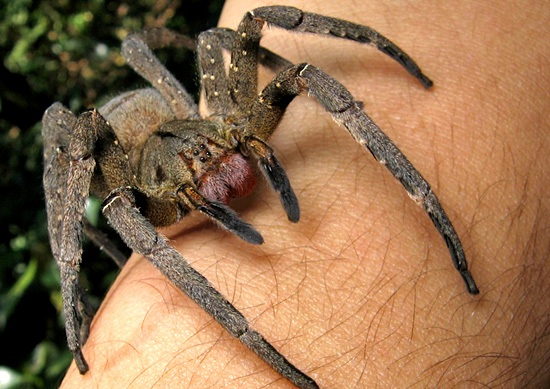
Female specimen of P. cf nigriventer: This and other species of the genus Phoneutria have medically significant venom that can be dangerous if the spiders are handled.

As of March 2021, the World Spider Catalog accepted the following species:

- Phoneutria bahiensis Simó & Brescovit, 2001 – Brazil
- Phoneutria boliviensis (F. O. Pickard-Cambridge, 1897) – Central, South America
- Phoneutria depilata (Strand, 1909) – Guatemala, Honduras, Nicaragua, Costa Rica, Panama, Colombia, Ecuador
- Phoneutria eickstedtae Martins & Bertani, 2007 – Brazil
- Phoneutria fera Perty, 1833 (type) – Colombia, Ecuador, Peru, Brazil, Suriname, Guyana
- Phoneutria keyserlingi (F. O. Pickard-Cambridge, 1897) – Brazil
- Phoneutria nigriventer (Keyserling, 1891) – Brazil, Uruguay, Paraguay, Argentina
- Phoneutria pertyi (F. O. Pickard-Cambridge, 1897) – Brazil
- Phoneutria reidyi (F. O. Pickard-Cambridge, 1897) – Colombia, Venezuela, Peru, Brazil, Guyana

== Behaviour ==
Wandering spiders are so-called because they wander the jungle floor at night, rather than residing in a lair or maintaining a web. During the day they hide inside termite mounds, under fallen logs and rocks, and in banana plants (hence the "banana spider" nickname) and bromeliads. P. nigriventer is known to hide in dark and moist places in or near human dwellings.

P. nigriventer mates during the dry season from April to June, leading to frequent observations of the species.

== Distribution ==
Phoneutria are found in forests from Costa Rica southwards throughout South America east of the Andes including Colombia, Venezuela, the Guianas, Ecuador, Peru, Bolivia, Brazil, Paraguay, and into northern Argentina. Three species (P. reidyi, P. boliviensis and P. fera) are found in the Amazon region, one species (P. fera) is restricted to the Amazon, and one (P. depilata) ranges into Central America in Panama and Costa Rica. The remaining species are restricted to Atlantic Forest of Argentina, Paraguay, and Brazil, including forest fragments in the Cerrado savanna. In Brazil, Phoneutria is only absent in the northeastern region north of Salvador, Bahia.

Phoneutria has been introduced to Chile and Uruguay.

=== Banana shipments ===
These spiders acquired their other common name, "banana spider", because it is claimed that they are occasionally found in shipments of bananas, though the number of reports is exaggerated due to common misidentifications of unrelated spiders. A survey of spiders found in international shipments to North America revealed that only 7 of 135 spiders were Phoneutria species: six Phoneutria boliviensis from bananas, and one Phoneutria nigriventer from a shipment of electrical parts. Spiders from genera such as Cupiennius had been misidentified by experienced arachnologists. Cases continue to be reported but without evidence of expert identification. In 2005, a man was bitten in Bridgwater, England, by a spider in a shipment of bananas, and in 2014, a south London family photographed a spider that they claimed was delivered to their home in a bunch of bananas.

== Medical significance ==
The genus Phoneutria includes some of the few species of spiders known to present a threat to humans. Danger to humans comprises not only toxicity of the venom, but also such factors as the spider's capacity and proclivity to bite and deliver a dangerous dose, and proximity to human habitation. These spiders' wandering nature is another reason they are considered so dangerous. In densely populated areas, Phoneutria species usually search for cover and dark places to hide during daytime, which can include houses, clothes, cars, boots, boxes, and log piles, where they may bite if accidentally disturbed.

Spider mouth parts are adapted to envenomate very small prey; they are not well adapted to attacking large mammals such as humans. Some believe that various spiders which use venom mainly to kill prey, such as Phoneutria, can deliver a "dry" bite in defence, purposely conserving their venom, in contrast to the more primitive spider-like Atrax which usually delivers a full load. A study in March 2009 suggests that Phoneutria inject venom in approximately one-third of their bites, and only a small quantity in one-third of those cases. Another study similarly suggested that only 2.3% of bites (mainly in children) were serious enough to require antivenom. Research in this area is hindered by the difficulty of identifying particular species. Nevertheless, there are a few well-attested instances of death. In one case, a single spider, positively identified as a Phoneutria by Wolfgang Bücherl, killed two children in São Sebastião. Fatalities are usually attributed to respiratory arrest, secondary to systemic effects, or directly to envenoming. Systemic effects occur in 9% to 27% of cases; symptoms at the site are more frequent, occurring from 83% to 96% of cases. The severity of the cases can be related to the sex of the spider, since the male produces less venom and is less lethal than the females, except for P. boliviensis, in which the male is more toxic. Symptoms may appear within 10 to 20 minutes after the bite, and death within two to six hours, during which severe pain radiates to the rest of the limb and systemic effects include tachycardia, increased blood pressure, vertigo, fever, sweating, visual disturbances, nausea, vomiting, difficulty breathing and paralysis. Death is usually caused by respiratory arrest. These spiders seem to produce a smaller amount of venom during cold months (June to September), a minimum of 0.03 mg, an average of 0.44 mg, and a maximum of 1.84 mg during the summer months. The maximum amount observed among individuals was 3.10 mg (October 26), 4 mg (November 3), 5 mg (November 4) and 8 mg (October 31). 7 mg of dried venom is enough to kill 500 mice subcutaneously and 1,000 intravenously.

P. nigriventer is the species responsible for most cases of envenomation in Brazil because it is commonly found in highly populated areas of southeastern Brazil, such as the states of São Paulo, Minas Gerais, Rio de Janeiro and Espírito Santo.

=== Non-fatal cases ===
A 45-year-old man, with no nervous background, employed in the agricultural section of the Butantan Institute, working barefoot, was bitten at 10:40 AM on the small toe of his left foot by a medium-sized Phoneutria. Immediately he felt intense pain that radiated to his foot and leg. He also reported visual disturbances, and when he tried to enter the building, he fell. Without strength, he was supported by two men to the laboratory, where he was examined. He could not stand, had difficulty seeing, difficulty talking (he could not answer questions), and complained of severe general pain and intense cold. He was sweating profusely, there was hyper nasal secretion and salivation, which made him blow his nose and spit constantly. He was agitated, with generalized tremors and continuous cramps in his left foot and leg, and an irregular pulse with 112 beats per minute. An hour after the accident, the serum was injected into the left buttock. During the next hour, the pulse became faster, thready, almost uncountable, and the temperature decreased, with a worsening of the general condition. At noon the victim received a new injection of serum and by 1:00 pm there was improvement.

In another case, a 16-year-old boy was bitten on his left hand. The victim had severe general pain, visual disturbance, generalized tremors, cramps, profuse sweating, and a weak, irregular rapid pulse.

A 23-year-old market worker moving a bunch of bananas was bitten on his hand by P. nigriventer in São Paulo, Brazil. The specimen measured 3.5 cm long and 6 cm with its legs. It was reported that the wound was extremely painful, with the victim noticing that the bite area was sweating and the hair on his skin stood on end. He also reported that the pain radiated to his chest and that his heart began to race. The victim was dizzy and nauseated, felt cold, began to drool and vomit, and exhibited priapism. He was later treated with anesthetics, tetanus prophylaxis, and anti-venom, and recovered 36 hours after the bite.

Another case occurred with a 52-year-old man, bitten by an adult female P. nigriventer. Immediately after the bite, he experienced severe local pain, blurred vision, profuse sweating, and vomiting. From one to two hours after the bite he presented agitation and high blood pressure; at four hours after the heart rate was high at 150 beats per minute, mild tachypnea, cold extremities, profuse sweating, generalized tremors, and priapism. He was treated with anesthetics, anti-venom, and fluid replacement.

In 2005, an English man was bitten twice by a spider identified as a Phoneutria, which was hidden in a box of bananas. It was reported that his hand became swollen, he felt dizzy, and when he got home he collapsed. He was taken to the hospital and received treatment, but his condition continued to deteriorate. He reported chest tightness, and difficulty breathing, and both his blood pressure and heart rate were high. He was treated with increased saline to release toxins from the body and was discharged the next day. He took almost a week to recover.

A 70-year-old man was bitten by a spider with a leg span of 5 to 6 cm. He was cutting sugarcane at the residence of São Pedro de Alcantara, in the countryside, when a spider jumped on his shoulder and came "walking" by the right arm to the back where it bit his hand (bled at the time); he felt intense pain at the time. The spider had several young in the abdomen. The patient evolved with agitation, anxiety, blood pressure 200x110 mmHg, heart rate of 62 beats per minute, respiratory rate of 36 breathing movements per minute, respiratory distress, hyperemia, edema and radiating pain. After 50 minutes, the patient was admitted to the emergency department of the HU with blood pressure 150x90 (after captopril), mild dyspnea (patient pneumectomized by TU), with paresthesias and local condition as previously reported. He received anesthetic infiltration, dipyrone and two vials of serum, the right hand remained red and swollen, with improvement in anxiety symptoms and control blood pressure.

Another case occurred in Minas Gerais, Brazil, where a man bitten by a Phoneutria developed numbness in his legs, redness, headache, and loss of sense of time and space.

=== Fatal cases ===
In a case that occurred in Itanhaém, São Paulo, a 40-year-old man bitten in the foot, presented significant pain and generalized contractures, dying six hours after being bitten.

A 7-year-old child, bitten in the ear, presented convulsions, opisthotonos, and progressive paralysis, dying 17 hours after being bitten.

In a case that occurred in Franca, a 10-year-old child bitten on the middle finger of the right hand, presented severe pain, trismus, tremors in the right arm and face, evolving to permanent contracture, respiratory paralysis, cyanosis, and convulsions, dying in 30–40 minutes after being bitten.

In São Sebastião, São Paulo, two brothers, 6 months and 18 months old, the children woke up during the night crying and screaming, dying soon after (time of death is not described). The father removed the sheets and found the spider, which was referred to the Butantan Institute, identified as a large female Phoneutria nigriventer.

A 3-year-old girl, bitten on the third finger of her right hand, presented immediate local pain, periods of alternating prostration, cold sweating, chest and abdomen pains, and 3 episodes of vomiting, was admitted to UNICAMP 3 hours after being bitten, with the same symptoms. 5 vials of AV (Antivenom) and local anesthetic infiltration were administered, and there was an improvement in symptoms, with a decrease in sweating, but still agitated, 2–3 hours after AV, there was a picture of significant diarrhea (semi-liquid stools) evolving to 2nd-degree dehydration. Parenteral hydration was started, 3h30 min post AV, her heart rate was 160 beats per minute, and her respiratory rate was 72 at 4 hours post AV. Between 4h15min and 4h30min after AV, she had peripheral cyanosis, a heart rate of 150 beats per minute dyspnea, and loss of peripheral venous access. Afterward, there was disseminated pulmonary stertoration, and worsening of agitation, dyspnea, and bradycardia, while being performed orotracheal intubation, manual ventilation, adrenaline, and external cardiac massage, she later died.
