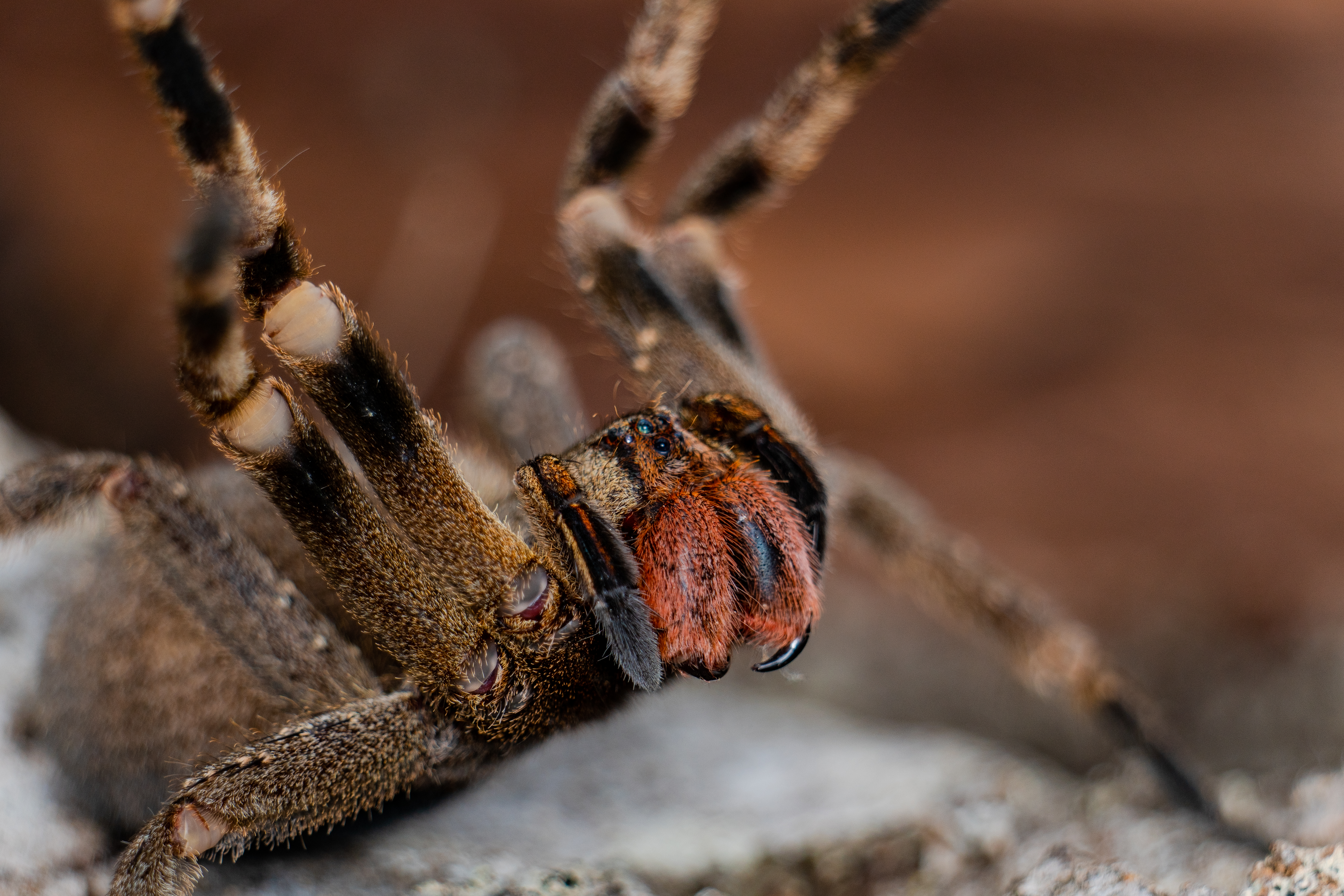

Scientific classification
- Kingdom: Animalia
- Phylum: Arthropoda
- Subphylum: Chelicerata
- Class: Arachnida
- Order: Araneae
- Infraorder: Araneomorphae
- Family: Ctenidae
- Genus: Phoneutria
- Species: P. nigriventer

Binomial name
- Phoneutria nigriventer (Keyserling, 1891)

= Phoneutria nigriventer =

Species of arachnid

Phoneutria nigriventer is a species of medically significant spider in the family Ctenidae, found in the Southern Cone of South America (Brazil, Uruguay, Paraguay, and Argentina). Along with other members of the genus, they are often referred to as Brazilian wandering spiders.

Its bite can cause severe symptoms, including increased pulse, blood pressure, and respiratory rate, very severe pain, priapism, and in several documented cases, death.

== Description and behavior ==
Phoneutria nigriventer is a large spider. Its maximum body length is around 5 cm and its legs can span 15 cm in larger individuals. Its body is covered in thick brown hair. They are nocturnal, and hunt at night, killing by ambush rather than using a web; during the day, they are found hidden under logs or crevices. When threatened, it raises its first two pairs of legs as a warning. It also occurs in banana trees, foliage, and urban regions, mainly inside residences.

== Reproduction ==
As with most spider species, the female is larger than the male. The mating ritual takes place with the male dancing to get the female's attention, with the males even fighting each other. After mating, females may attack males. The female can store the sperm in a chamber separate from the eggs, until she is ready for fertilization. They may lay about 1,000 eggs, which are stored in a silk sac. One study claims that females with egg sacs are slightly more toxic than females without egg sacs.

== Toxicity and prey ==
The bite of P. nigriventer in humans can cause several symptoms such as priapism, tachycardia, arrhythmias, cardiogenic shock, acute pulmonary edema and convulsions. P. nigriventer can choose to deliver a dry bite (without injecting venom) or a minimal dose.

The venom of P. nigriventer has been reported to contain at least six neurotoxic peptides globally known as PhTx3 and individually identified as Tx3-1 to Tx3-6. Tx3-3 has also been named ω-Phoneutria nigriventer toxin ω-PnTx3-3 and Tx3-4, phonetoxin IIA or ω-Ptx-IIA. These toxins act as broad-spectrum calcium channel blockers that inhibit glutamate release, calcium uptake and also glutamate uptake in neural synapses. At deadly concentrations, these neurotoxins cause loss of muscle control and breathing problems, resulting in paralysis and eventual asphyxiation. In addition, the venom causes intense pain and inflammation following a bite, due to an excitatory effect the venom has on the serotonin 5-HT4 receptor of sensory nerves. This sensory nerve stimulation causes a cascading release of neuropeptides such as substance P, which triggers inflammation and pain. Studies on the effects of the venom in dogs have shown low lethal doses to be around 0.2 mg/kg (SC). The median lethal dose for females is 0.63 mg / kg (95% confidence interval [0.54-0.71], for females with egg sacs the LD50 is 0.61 mg / kg [0.56-0.73]. For males the LD50 is 1.57 mg / kg. Differences between the venom of male and female Phoneutria nigriventer have been reported, with females producing a greater quantity of venom. PhTx-2 is considered the most toxic group, which is also potent for primates. Humans can be ten times more sensitive to the P. nigriventer venom compared to mice. Primates, such as monkeys and humans, are said to react particularly strongly to the venom components.

Aside from causing intense pain, the venom of the spider can also cause priapism in humans. Erections resulting from the bite are uncomfortable, can last for many hours and can lead to impotence. A component of the venom, Tx2-6, is being studied for use in erectile dysfunction treatments.

The Brazilian wandering spider's prey includes crickets, katydids, mantids, as well as larger animals, including tree frogs, lizards and bats.

The average venom yield is 1.25 mg, and 0.4 mg in the winter.

== Case reports ==
A 23-year-old market worker was bitten on his hand in São Paulo, Brazil, while moving a bunch of bananas. The specimen measured 3.5 cm long and 6 cm with its legs. It was reported that the bite was extremely painful, accompanied by sweating and hairs standing on end. The victim additionally reported pain radiating to his chest, increased heart rate, dizziness, nausea, coldness, drooling, vomiting, and an immediate erection. He was treated with anesthetics, tetanus prophylaxis and antivenom, recovering 36 hours after the bite.

Another case occurred with a 52-year-old man bitten by an adult female. Immediately after the bite, he experienced severe local pain, blurred vision, profuse sweating, and vomiting. One to two hours after the bite he presented agitation and high blood pressure. Four hours after the bite, his heart rate reached 150 beats / min, and he also experienced mild tachypnea, cold extremities, profuse sweating, generalized tremors, and priapism. He was treated with anesthetics, antivenom and fluid replacement.

In a period from 1925 to 1945 there were recorded 415 bites by this species, 400 of which required antivenom.
