= List of Atracidae species =

This page lists all described species of the spider family Atracidae accepted by the World Spider Catalog as of December 2020:

== Atrax ==
Atrax O. Pickard-Cambridge, 1877

- A. robustus O. Pickard-Cambridge, 1877 (type) — Australia (New South Wales)
- A. sutherlandi Gray, 2010 — Australia (New South Wales, Victoria)
- A. yorkmainorum Gray, 2010 — Australia (New South Wales, Australian Capital Territory)
- ‘’ A. christenseni’’ Christensen, 2025 - Australia (New South Wales, Newcastle, Greater Sydney)*’’

== Hadronyche ==
Hadronyche

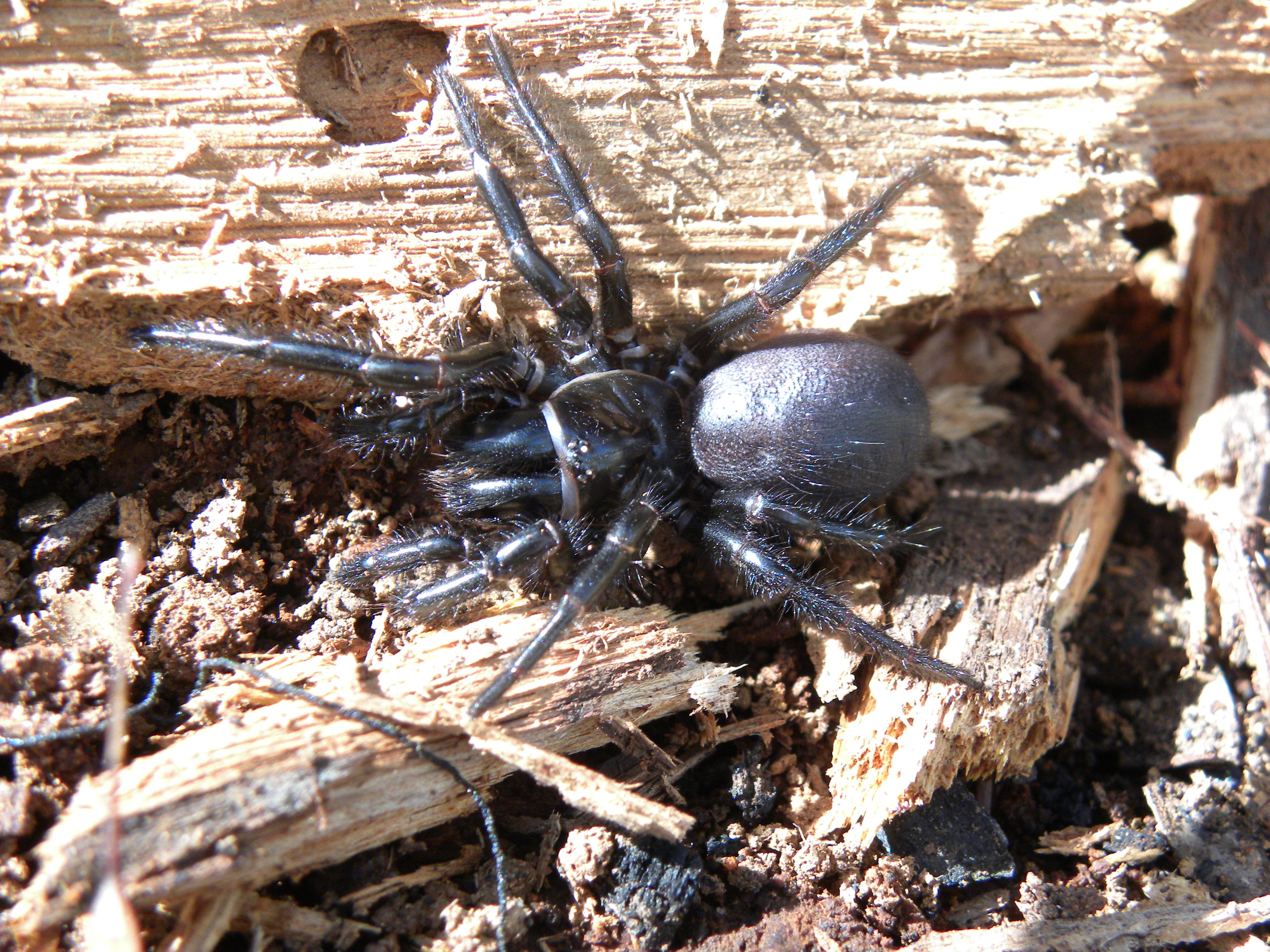
Southern tree funnel-web spider (Hadronyche cerberea)

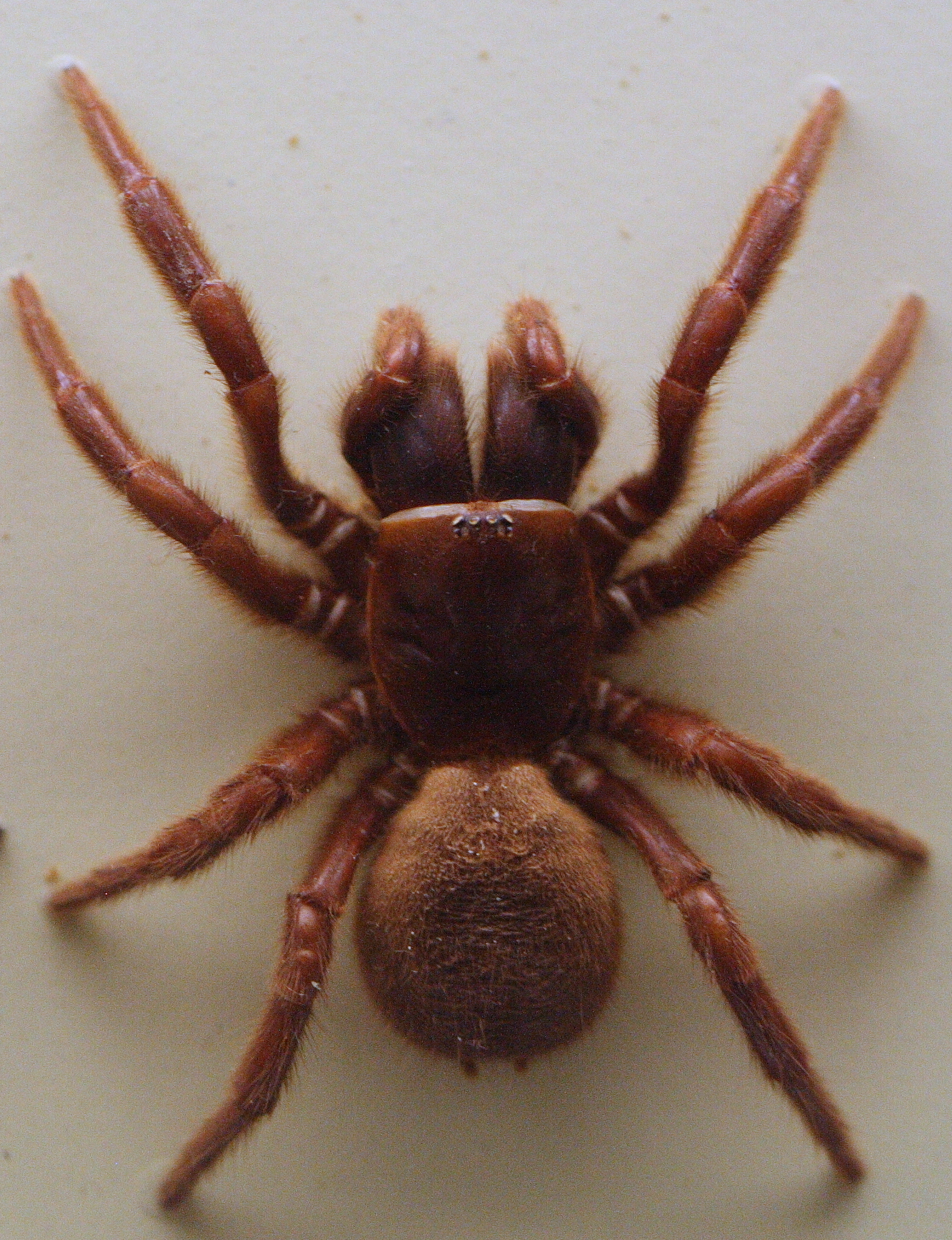
Northern tree funnel-web spider (Hadronyche formidabilis)

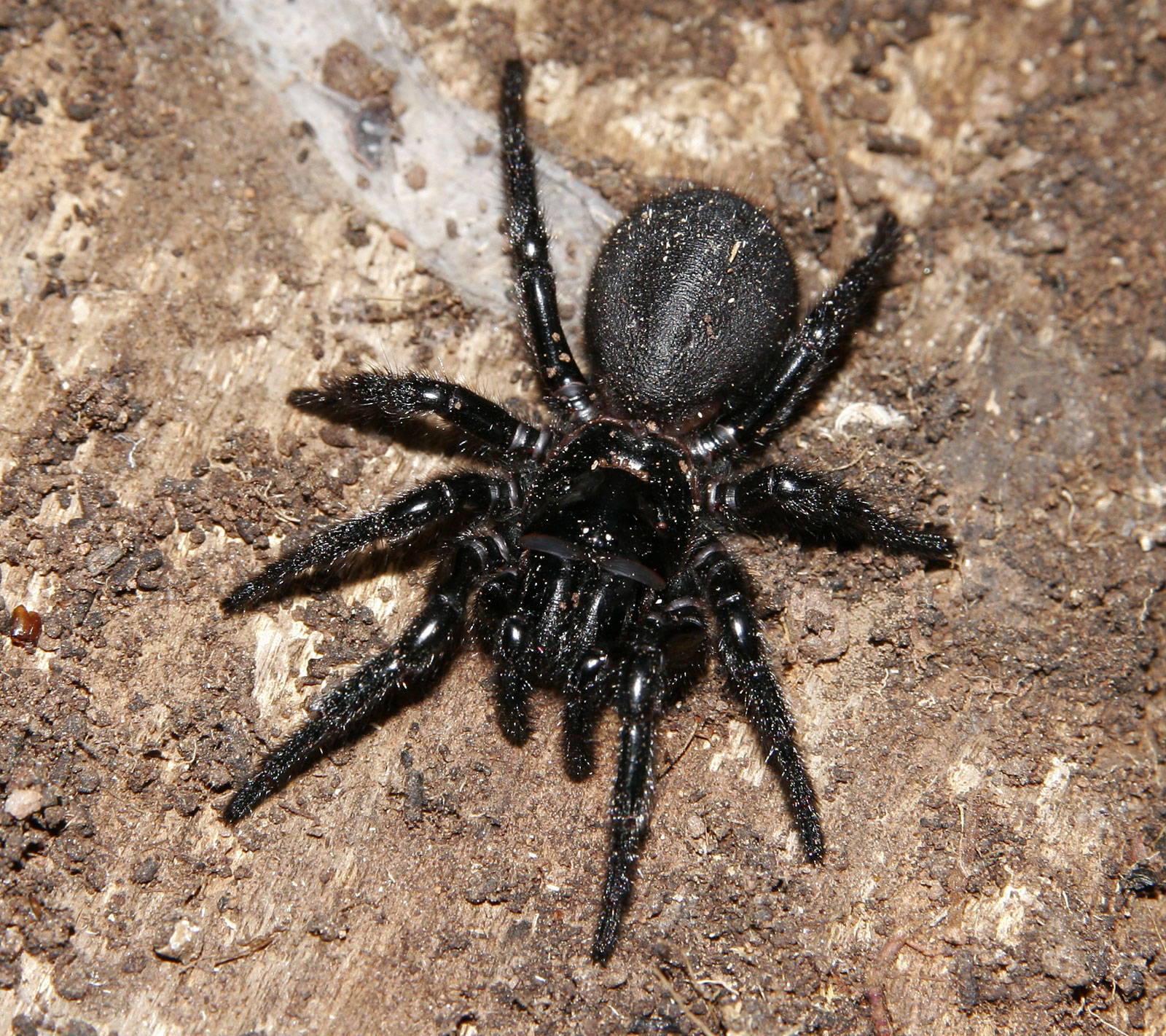
Victorian funnel-web spider (Hadronyche modesta)

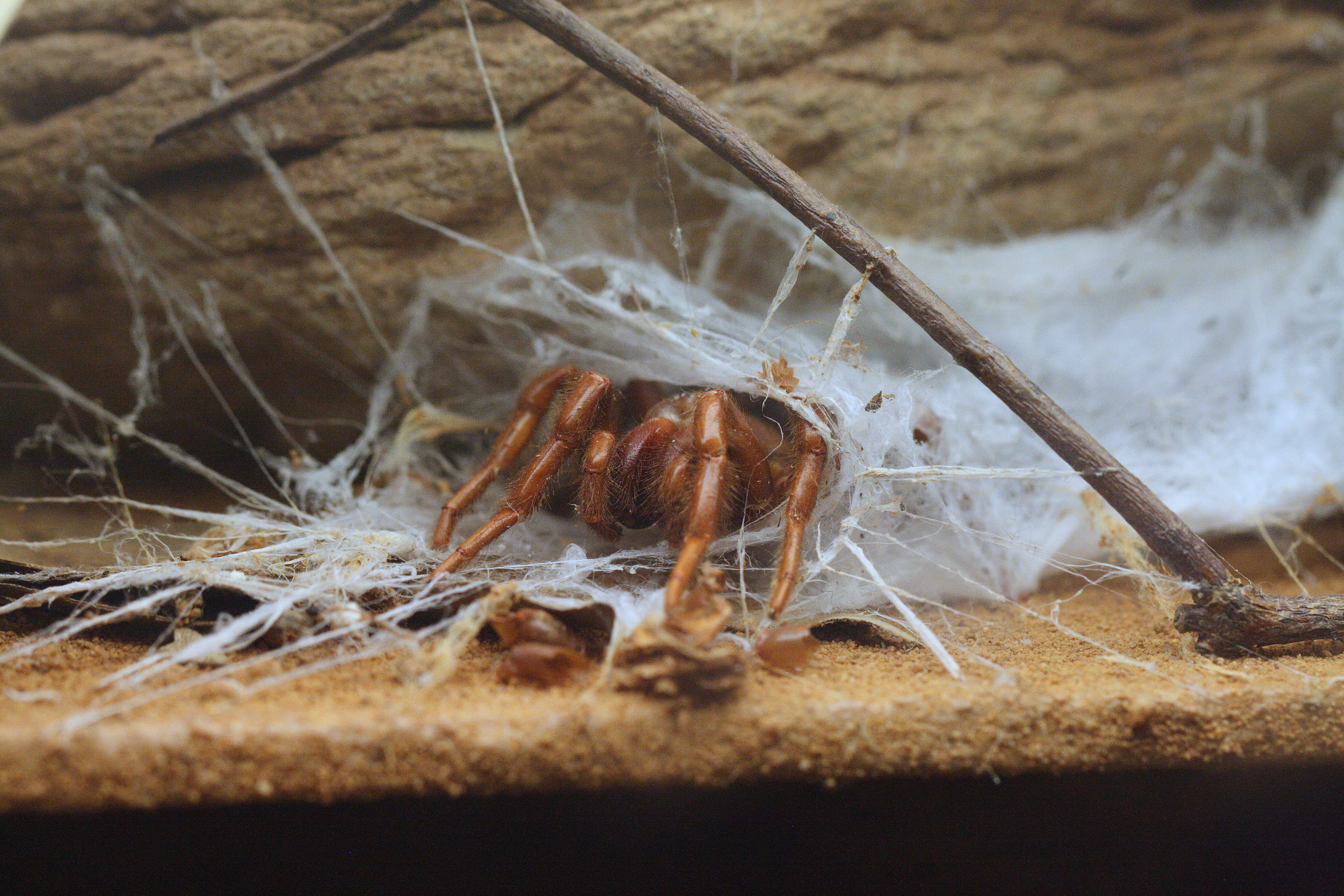
Blue Mountains funnel-web spider (Hadronyche versuta)

Hadronyche L. Koch, 1873

- H. adelaidensis (Gray, 1984) — Australia (South Australia)
- H. alpina Gray, 2010 — Australia (New South Wales, Australian Capital Territory)
- H. annachristiae Gray, 2010 — Australia (New South Wales)
- H. anzses Raven, 2000 — Australia (Queensland)
- H. cerberea L. Koch, 1873 (type) — Australia (New South Wales)
- H. emmalizae Gray, 2010 — Australia (New South Wales)
- H. eyrei (Gray, 1984) — Australia (South Australia)
- H. flindersi (Gray, 1984) — Australia (South Australia)
- H. formidabilis (Rainbow, 1914) — Australia (Queensland, New South Wales)
- H. infensa (Hickman, 1964) — Australia (Queensland, New South Wales)
- H. jensenae Gray, 2010 — Australia (Victoria)
- H. kaputarensis Gray, 2010 — Australia (New South Wales)
- H. lamingtonensis Gray, 2010 — Australia (Queensland)
- H. levittgreggae Gray, 2010 — Australia (New South Wales)
- H. lynabrae Gray, 2010 — Australia (New South Wales)
- H. macquariensis Gray, 2010 — Australia (New South Wales)
- H. marracoonda Gray, 2010 — Australia (New South Wales, Australian Capital Territory)
- H. mascordi Gray, 2010 — Australia (New South Wales)
- H. meridiana Hogg, 1902 — Australia (New South Wales, Victoria)
- H. modesta (Simon, 1891) — Australia (Victoria)
- H. monaro Gray, 2010 — Australia (New South Wales)
- H. monteithi Gray, 2010 — Australia (Queensland)
- H. nadgee Whitington & Harris, 2021 – Australia (New South Wales)
- H. nimoola Gray, 2010 — Australia (New South Wales, Australian Capital Territory)
- H. orana Gray, 2010 — Australia (New South Wales)
- H. pulvinator (Hickman, 1927) — Australia (Tasmania)
- H. raveni Gray, 2010 — Australia (Queensland)
- H. tambo Gray, 2010 — Australia (Victoria)
- H. valida (Rainbow & Pulleine, 1918) — Australia (Queensland, New South Wales)
- H. venenata (Hickman, 1927) — Australia (Tasmania)
- H. versuta (Rainbow, 1914) — Australia (New South Wales)
- H. walkeri Gray, 2010 — Australia (New South Wales)

== Illawarra ==
Illawarra Gray, 2010

- I. wisharti Gray, 2010 (type) — Australia (New South Wales)
