= Hc3a =

Spider Neurotoxin

- Source: Australian funnel Web spider
- Amino acids: NECIRKWLSCVDRKNDCCEGLECWKRRGNKSSVCVPIT
- Target: ASCI1
- Family: Inhibitor cysteine knot
Pi-Hexatoxin-Hc1b_1
Identifiers
- Organism: Hadronyche cerberea
- Symbol: Hc3a
- RefSeq (mRNA): HAHJ01000277
- RefSeq (Prot): SNX35365
- UniProt: A0A4Q8K7H6
Search for
- Structures: Swiss-model
- Domains: InterPro

Hc3a is a peptide from the venom of the Australian funnel web spider, which slows down desensitisation of the acid-sensing sodium channel ASIC1a.

== Source ==
Hc3a is a peptide derived from the venom gland of the Australian Funnel web spider Hadronyche cerberea.

== Chemistry ==
Hc3a is a single inhibitor cystine knot (ICK) peptide consisting of 38 amino acids. It resembles other single and double ICKs such as PcTx1 and Hm3a. It strongly resembles Hc1a, a double ICK also found in H. cerbrea venom, and Hi1a as the N-terminal 23 amino acids are identical and the C-terminal 15 amino acids differ by only a single or two amino acids, respectively.

The amino acid sequence of Hc3a is:

NECIRKWLSCVDRKNDCCEGLECWKRRGNKSSVCVPIT

The structure of Hc3a is a hydrophobic patch surrounded by charged residues, showing an identical fold as PcTx1. It contains three disulphide bridges that give rise to a tightly knotted structure with 3 folds. Despite these similarities, Hc3a seems to have a different mechanism of action than other known peptides that act on the same channel.

== Target ==
Hc3a, in a similar way as PcTx1, binds to the acidic pocket of the proton-activated sodium channel ASIC1a.

== Mode of action ==
Hc3a has complex pharmacology, but its main effect appears to be that it can bind to ASIC1a in the open state and potentiate currents by slowing down desensitisation. Hc3a also shifts the steady-state desensitisation curve to slightly more alkaline values.
