= Hadronyche raveni =

Scientific classification
- Kingdom: Animalia
- Phylum: Arthropoda
- Subphylum: Chelicerata
- Class: Arachnida
- Order: Araneae
- Infraorder: Mygalomorphae
- Family: Atracidae
- Genus: Hadronyche
- Species: H. raveni

Binomial name
- Hadronyche raveni Gray, 2010

Species of spider

Hadronyche raveni is a species of funnel-web spider in the Atracidae family. It is endemic to Australia. It was described in 2010 by Australian arachnologist Michael R. Gray. The species epithet raveni honours Dr Robert Raven, Senior Curator of Arachnology at the Queensland Museum.

== Distribution and habitat ==
The species occurs in the Conondale Range of south-eastern Queensland.
