= Hadronyche adelaidensis =

Scientific classification
- Kingdom: Animalia
- Phylum: Arthropoda
- Subphylum: Chelicerata
- Class: Arachnida
- Order: Araneae
- Infraorder: Mygalomorphae
- Family: Atracidae
- Genus: Hadronyche
- Species: H. adelaidensis

Binomial name
- Hadronyche adelaidensis (Gray, 1984)

Synonyms
- Atrax adelaidensis Gray, 1984

Species of spider

Hadronyche adelaidensis, also known as the Adelaide funnel-web spider, is a species of funnel-web spider in the Atracidae family. It is endemic to Australia. It was described in 1984 by Australian arachnologist Michael R. Gray.

== Distribution and habitat ==
The species is found in the Mount Lofty Ranges and the Adelaide region of South Australia.
