= Hadronyche emmalizae =

Scientific classification
- Kingdom: Animalia
- Phylum: Arthropoda
- Subphylum: Chelicerata
- Class: Arachnida
- Order: Araneae
- Infraorder: Mygalomorphae
- Family: Atracidae
- Genus: Hadronyche
- Species: H. emmalizae

Binomial name
- Hadronyche emmalizae Gray, 2010

Species of spider

Hadronyche emmalizae is a species of funnel-web spider in the Atracidae family. It is endemic to Australia. It was described in 2010 by Australian arachnologist Michael R. Gray. The species epithet honours the author's daughter, Emma Elizabeth Jensen Gray.

== Distribution and habitat ==
The species occurs in the Bago State Forest and Khancoban-Geehi region, on the western side of the Snowy Mountains, in New South Wales.
