= Hadronyche venenata =

Scientific classification
- Kingdom: Animalia
- Phylum: Arthropoda
- Subphylum: Chelicerata
- Class: Arachnida
- Order: Araneae
- Infraorder: Mygalomorphae
- Family: Atracidae
- Genus: Hadronyche
- Species: H. venenata

Binomial name
- Hadronyche venenata (Hickman, 1927)

Synonyms
- Atrax venenatus Hickman, 1927

Species of spider

Hadronyche venenata, also known as the Tasmanian funnel-web spider, is a species of funnel-web spider in the Atracidae family. It is endemic to Australia. It was described in 1927 by Australian arachnologist Vernon Victor Hickman.

== Distribution and habitat ==
The species occurs in eastern Tasmania, where it is known from forested parts of the Ben Lomond, Flinders and Tasmanian South East IBRA bioregions.

== Behaviour ==
The spiders construct silk-lined burrows in the ground beneath decaying logs and large rocks.

=== Venom ===
The species is venomous and potentially dangerous. Little is known about the toxicity of its venom, though its bite is reportedly painful.
