= Hadronyche monteithi =

Scientific classification
- Kingdom: Animalia
- Phylum: Arthropoda
- Subphylum: Chelicerata
- Class: Arachnida
- Order: Araneae
- Infraorder: Mygalomorphae
- Family: Atracidae
- Genus: Hadronyche
- Species: H. monteithi

Binomial name
- Hadronyche monteithi Gray, 2010

Species of spider

Hadronyche monteithi is a species of funnel-web spider in the Atracidae family. It is endemic to Australia. It was described in 2010 by Australian arachnologist Michael R. Gray. The species epithet monteithi honours Dr Geoff Monteith, collector of type specimens and other spider species.

== Distribution and habitat ==
The species occurs in the border ranges in the Killarney region of south-eastern Queensland.
