= Hadronyche flindersi =

Scientific classification
- Kingdom: Animalia
- Phylum: Arthropoda
- Subphylum: Chelicerata
- Class: Arachnida
- Order: Araneae
- Infraorder: Mygalomorphae
- Family: Atracidae
- Genus: Hadronyche
- Species: H. flindersi

Binomial name
- Hadronyche flindersi (Gray, 1984)

Synonyms
- Atrax flindersi Gray, 1984

Species of spider

Hadronyche flindersi, also known as the Flinders Ranges funnel-web spider, is a species of funnel-web spider in the Atracidae family. It is endemic to Australia. It was described in 1984 by Australian arachnologist Michael R. Gray.

== Description ==
The carapace is a glossy brownish-black in colour, the back and sides of the abdomen a dark maroon-brown with a paler, pinkish, underside. There are four pairs of pale markings on the upper and lateral surfaces. The venom contains excitatory neurotoxins.

== Distribution and habitat ==
The species occurs in the southern Flinders Ranges of South Australia. The type locality is on the lower slopes of Mount Remarkable, 3 km north of Melrose. The spiders are found in open forest and woodland habitats.

== Behaviour ==
The spiders construct burrows, without surface triplines, in or beneath leaf litter. The burrows contain a side chamber and have an entrance with a soil door in a collapsible silk collar.
