= Huntiglennia =

Scientific classification
- Kingdom: Animalia
- Phylum: Arthropoda
- Subphylum: Chelicerata
- Class: Arachnida
- Order: Araneae
- Infraorder: Araneomorphae
- Family: Salticidae
- Subfamily: Salticinae
- Genus: Huntiglennia; Zabka & Gray, 2004
- Species: H. williamsi

Binomial name
- Huntiglennia williamsi Zabka & Gray, 2004

Genus of spiders

Huntiglennia is a genus of jumping spiders found in New South Wales, in the brigalow belt. Its single described species is Huntiglennia williamsi.

The genus was first described by Marek Zabka and Michael Gray in 2004.
