= Hadronyche tambo =

Scientific classification
- Kingdom: Animalia
- Phylum: Arthropoda
- Subphylum: Chelicerata
- Class: Arachnida
- Order: Araneae
- Infraorder: Mygalomorphae
- Family: Atracidae
- Genus: Hadronyche
- Species: H. tambo

Binomial name
- Hadronyche tambo Gray, 2010

Species of spider

Hadronyche tambo is a species of funnel-web spider in the Atracidae family. It is endemic to Australia. It was described in 2010 by Australian arachnologist Michael R. Gray. The species epithet tambo refers to the Tambo River in Gippsland.

== Distribution and habitat ==
The species occurs in the Bairnsdale – Buchan region of East Gippsland, Victoria.
