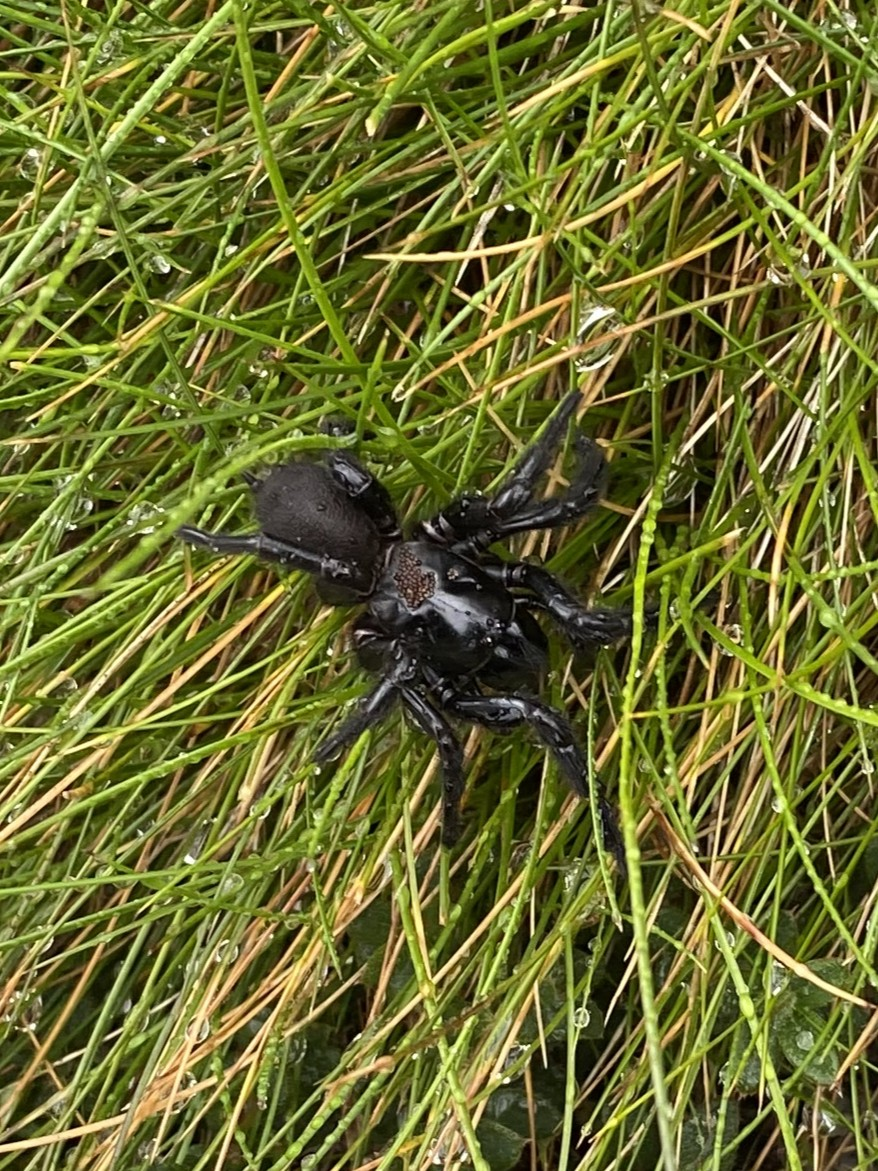

Scientific classification
- Kingdom: Animalia
- Phylum: Arthropoda
- Subphylum: Chelicerata
- Class: Arachnida
- Order: Araneae
- Infraorder: Mygalomorphae
- Family: Atracidae
- Genus: Hadronyche
- Species: H. alpina

Binomial name
- Hadronyche alpina Gray, 2010

= Hadronyche alpina =

Species of spider

Hadronyche alpina, also known as the Alpine funnel-web spider or Kosciusko funnel-web spider, is a species of funnel-web spider in the Atracidae family. It is endemic to Australia. It was described in 2010 by Australian arachnologist Michael R. Gray. The specific epithet alpina refers to the alpine habitats in the Snowy Mountains region where the spiders are found.

== Distribution and habitat ==
The species occurs in the Kosciuszko National Park of New South Wales and the Brindabella Range of the Australian Capital Territory, as well as in the Alpine National Park, Victoria.
