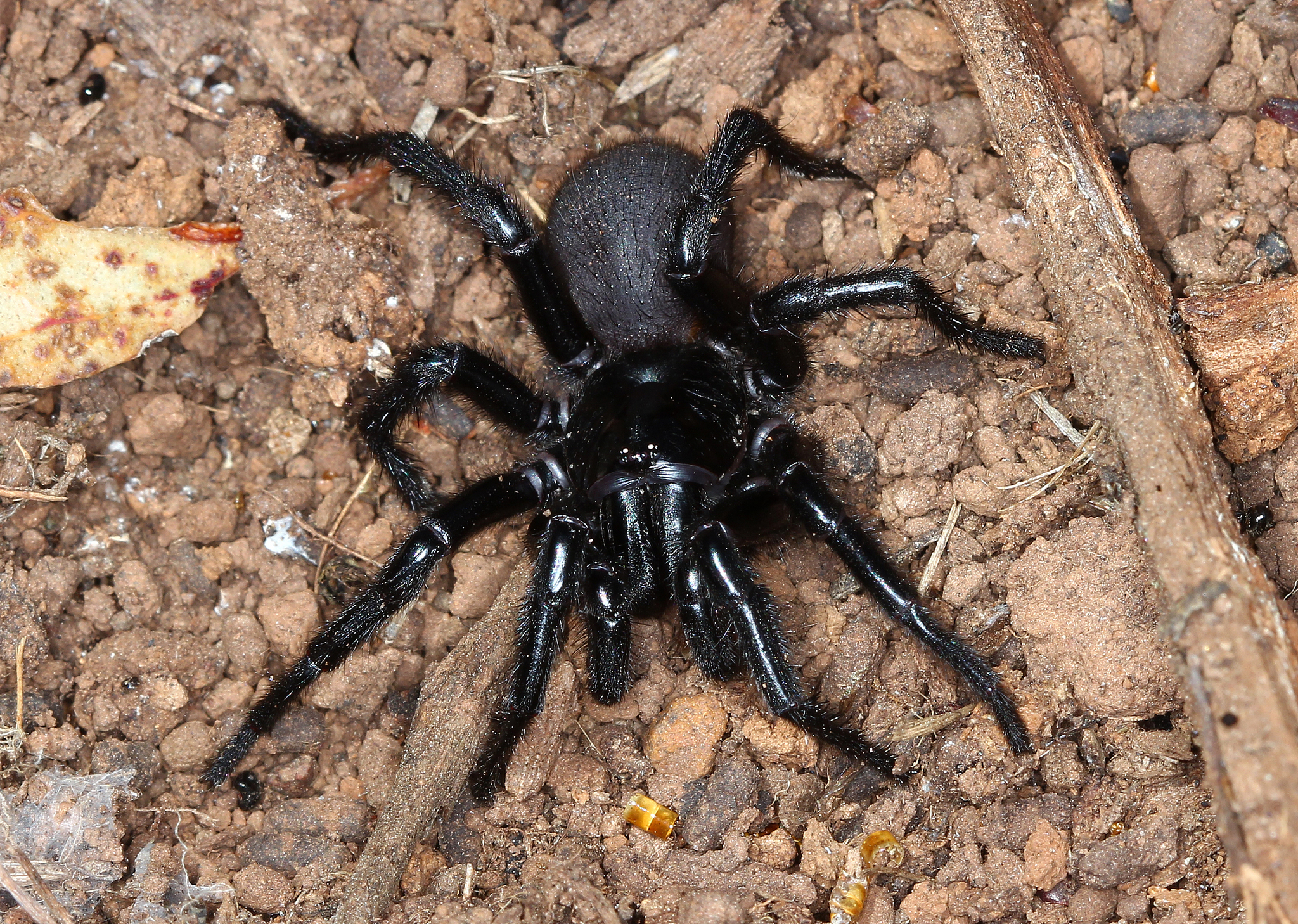
- near Bald Blair, Northern Tablelands, New South Wales

Scientific classification
- Kingdom: Animalia
- Phylum: Arthropoda
- Subphylum: Chelicerata
- Class: Arachnida
- Order: Araneae
- Infraorder: Mygalomorphae
- Family: Atracidae
- Genus: Hadronyche
- Species: H. walkeri

Binomial name
- Hadronyche walkeri Gray, 2010

= Hadronyche walkeri =

Species of spider

Hadronyche walkeri is a species of funnel-web spider in the Atracidae family. It is endemic to Australia. It was described in 2010 by Australian arachnologist Michael R. Gray. The species epithet walkeri honours Pat Walker, naturalist and photographer from North Queensland.

== Distribution and habitat ==
The species occurs from the Armidale region eastwards to the Dorrigo region in the New England Tablelands of northern New South Wales.
