= Hadronyche simonfearni =

Scientific classification
- Kingdom: Animalia
- Phylum: Arthropoda
- Subphylum: Chelicerata
- Class: Arachnida
- Order: Araneae
- Infraorder: Mygalomorphae
- Family: Atracidae
- Genus: Hadronyche
- Species: H. simonfearni

Binomial name
- Hadronyche simonfearni Raven & Douglas, 2025

Species of spider

Hadronyche simonfearni, commonly known as the Blue Tier funnel-web, is a species of funnel-web spider in the Atracidae family. It is endemic to Australia. It was described in 2025 by Dr Robert J. Raven and John C. Douglas. The species epithet simonfearni honours Simon Fearn, the original discoverer of the species.

== Distribution and habitat ==
The species occurs only in the far north-eastern corner of Tasmania, close to Mount Victoria.
