= Hadronyche levittgreggae =

Scientific classification
- Kingdom: Animalia
- Phylum: Arthropoda
- Subphylum: Chelicerata
- Class: Arachnida
- Order: Araneae
- Infraorder: Mygalomorphae
- Family: Atracidae
- Genus: Hadronyche
- Species: H. levittgreggae

Binomial name
- Hadronyche levittgreggae Gray, 2010

Species of spider

Hadronyche levittgreggae is a species of funnel-web spider in the Atracidae family. It is endemic to Australia. It was described in 2010 by Australian arachnologist Michael R. Gray. The species epithet levittgreggae honours naturalist and Australian Museum Associate Vera Levitt-Gregg.

== Distribution and habitat ==
The species occurs in the Hawkesbury River area, north-west of Sydney, in eastern New South Wales.
