= Hadronyche marracoonda =

Scientific classification
- Kingdom: Animalia
- Phylum: Arthropoda
- Subphylum: Chelicerata
- Class: Arachnida
- Order: Araneae
- Infraorder: Mygalomorphae
- Family: Atracidae
- Genus: Hadronyche
- Species: H. marracoonda

Binomial name
- Hadronyche marracoonda Gray, 2010

Species of spider

Hadronyche marracoonda, also known as the south-western slopes funnel-web spider, is a species of funnel-web spider in the Atracidae family. It is endemic to Australia. It was described in 2010 by Australian arachnologist Michael R. Gray. The species epithet marracoonda is an Aboriginal term meaning ‘towards the west’, with reference to the species’ range on the western slopes of the Great Dividing Range.

== Distribution and habitat ==
The species occurs along the western side of the Great Dividing Range in New South Wales and the Australian Capital Territory, from the latitude of Sydney southwards until close to the Victorian border.
