= Hadronyche jensenae =

Scientific classification
- Kingdom: Animalia
- Phylum: Arthropoda
- Subphylum: Chelicerata
- Class: Arachnida
- Order: Araneae
- Infraorder: Mygalomorphae
- Family: Atracidae
- Genus: Hadronyche
- Species: H. jensenae

Binomial name
- Hadronyche jensenae Gray, 2010

Species of spider

Hadronyche jensenae is a species of funnel-web spider in the Atracidae family. It is endemic to Australia. It was described in 2010 by Australian arachnologist Michael R. Gray. The species epithet honours the author's wife, Greta Jensen Gray.

== Distribution and habitat ==
The species occurs in Central Gippsland, Victoria.
