= Hadronyche pulvinator =

Scientific classification
- Kingdom: Animalia
- Phylum: Arthropoda
- Subphylum: Chelicerata
- Class: Arachnida
- Order: Araneae
- Infraorder: Mygalomorphae
- Family: Atracidae
- Genus: Hadronyche
- Species: †H. pulvinator

Binomial name
- †Hadronyche pulvinator (Hickman, 1927)

Synonyms
- Atrax pulvinator Hickman, 1927

Species of spider

Hadronyche pulvinator, also known as the Cascade funnel-web spider, is a species of funnel-web spider in the Atracidae family. It is endemic to Australia. It was described in 1927 by Australian arachnologist Vernon Victor Hickman.

== Distribution and habitat ==
The species occurred in south-east Tasmania; it is now presumed to be extinct under Tasmania's Threatened Species Protection Act 1995. It is known only from the female holotype specimen collected in 1926 from the type locality of Cascades, now a western suburb of Hobart, in the foothills of Mount Wellington.
