= Hadronyche lynabrae =

Scientific classification
- Kingdom: Animalia
- Phylum: Arthropoda
- Subphylum: Chelicerata
- Class: Arachnida
- Order: Araneae
- Infraorder: Mygalomorphae
- Family: Atracidae
- Genus: Hadronyche
- Species: H. lynabrae

Binomial name
- Hadronyche lynabrae Gray, 2010

Species of spider

Hadronyche lynabrae is a species of funnel-web spider in the Atracidae family. It is endemic to Australia. It was described in 2010 by Australian arachnologist Michael R. Gray. The species epithet lynabrae honours Lyn Abra of the Australian Reptile Park, who provided spider specimens to the Australian Museum.

== Distribution and habitat ==
The species occurs from the Hawkesbury River region to the south-eastern foothills of the Barrington Tops massif in New South Wales.
