= Hadronyche monaro =

Scientific classification
- Kingdom: Animalia
- Phylum: Arthropoda
- Subphylum: Chelicerata
- Class: Arachnida
- Order: Araneae
- Infraorder: Mygalomorphae
- Family: Atracidae
- Genus: Hadronyche
- Species: H. monaro

Binomial name
- Hadronyche monaro Gray, 2010

Species of spider

Hadronyche monaro is a species of funnel-web spider in the Atracidae family. It is endemic to Australia. It was described in 2010 by Australian arachnologist Michael R. Gray. The species epithet monaro refers to the Monaro region of south-eastern New South Wales.

== Distribution and habitat ==
The species occurs in the Eucumbene–Jindabyne area of the eastern Snowy Mountains of New South Wales.
