= Hadronyche kaputarensis =

Scientific classification
- Kingdom: Animalia
- Phylum: Arthropoda
- Subphylum: Chelicerata
- Class: Arachnida
- Order: Araneae
- Infraorder: Mygalomorphae
- Family: Atracidae
- Genus: Hadronyche
- Species: H. kaputarensis

Binomial name
- Hadronyche kaputarensis Gray, 2010

Species of spider

Hadronyche kaputarensis is a species of funnel-web spider in the Atracidae family. It is endemic to Australia. It was described in 2010 by Australian arachnologist Michael R. Gray. The species epithet refers to the type locality.

== Distribution and habitat ==
The species is known only from Mount Kaputar, near Narrabri in northern New South Wales.
