= Hadronyche orana =

Scientific classification
- Kingdom: Animalia
- Phylum: Arthropoda
- Subphylum: Chelicerata
- Class: Arachnida
- Order: Araneae
- Infraorder: Mygalomorphae
- Family: Atracidae
- Genus: Hadronyche
- Species: H. orana

Binomial name
- Hadronyche orana Gray, 2010

Species of spider

Hadronyche orana is a species of funnel-web spider in the Atracidae family. It is endemic to Australia. It was described in 2010 by Australian arachnologist Michael R. Gray. The species epithet orana refers to the Orana region of central northern New South Wales.

== Distribution and habitat ==
The species occurs on the western slopes of the Great Dividing Range from the Warrumbungles southwards to the Mudgee area of New South Wales.
