= Hadronyche nimoola =

Scientific classification
- Kingdom: Animalia
- Phylum: Arthropoda
- Subphylum: Chelicerata
- Class: Arachnida
- Order: Araneae
- Infraorder: Mygalomorphae
- Family: Atracidae
- Genus: Hadronyche
- Species: H. nimoola

Binomial name
- Hadronyche nimoola Gray, 2010

Species of spider

Hadronyche nimoola is a species of funnel-web spider in the Atracidae family. It is endemic to Australia. It was described in 2010 by Australian arachnologist Michael R. Gray. The species epithet nimoola is an Aboriginal term meaning ‘steep slope’, with reference to the spider's head profile.

== Distribution and habitat ==
The species occurs in the southern highlands and coastal areas of south-eastern New South Wales and in the Australian Capital Territory.
