= Hadronyche eyrei =

Scientific classification
- Kingdom: Animalia
- Phylum: Arthropoda
- Subphylum: Chelicerata
- Class: Arachnida
- Order: Araneae
- Infraorder: Mygalomorphae
- Family: Atracidae
- Genus: Hadronyche
- Species: H. eyrei

Binomial name
- Hadronyche eyrei (Gray, 1984)

Synonyms
- Atrax eyrei Gray, 1984

Species of spider

Hadronyche eyrei, also known as the Eyre Peninsula funnel-web spider, is a species of funnel-web spider in the Atracidae family. It is endemic to Australia. It was described in 1984 by Australian arachnologist Michael R. Gray.

== Description ==
The carapace is a glossy brownish-black in colour, the back and sides of the abdomen a dark maroon-brown with a paler underside. There are four pairs of pale markings on the upper and lateral surfaces. The venom contains excitatory neurotoxins.

== Distribution and habitat ==
The species occurs in the southern Eyre Peninsula region of South Australia. The type locality is 6.5 km south of Coulta. The spiders are found in open forest and woodland habitats.

== Behaviour ==
The spiders construct burrows, without surface triplines, in or beneath leaf litter. The burrows contain a side chamber and have an entrance with a soil door in a collapsible silk collar.
