= Hadronyche annachristiae =

Scientific classification
- Kingdom: Animalia
- Phylum: Arthropoda
- Subphylum: Chelicerata
- Class: Arachnida
- Order: Araneae
- Infraorder: Mygalomorphae
- Family: Atracidae
- Genus: Hadronyche
- Species: H. annachristiae

Binomial name
- Hadronyche annachristiae Gray, 2010

Species of spider

Hadronyche annachristiae is a species of funnel-web spider in the Atracidae family. It is endemic to Australia. It was described in 2010 by Australian arachnologist Michael R. Gray. The species epithet annachristiae honours the author’s daughter, Anna-Christie Gray.

== Distribution and habitat ==
The species occurs in the Kerewong and Lorne State Forests in the Mid North Coast region of New South Wales.
