= Hadronyche mascordi =

Scientific classification
- Kingdom: Animalia
- Phylum: Arthropoda
- Subphylum: Chelicerata
- Class: Arachnida
- Order: Araneae
- Infraorder: Mygalomorphae
- Family: Atracidae
- Genus: Hadronyche
- Species: H. mascordi

Binomial name
- Hadronyche mascordi Gray, 2010

Species of spider

Hadronyche mascordi is a species of funnel-web spider in the Atracidae family. It is endemic to Australia. It was described in 2010 by Australian arachnologist Michael R. Gray. The species epithet mascordi honours Ramon Mascord, an author, photographer and student of spiders.

== Distribution and habitat ==
The species occurs in the Kulnura–Somersby region of the New South Wales Central Coast.
