= Hadronyche lamingtonensis =

Scientific classification
- Kingdom: Animalia
- Phylum: Arthropoda
- Subphylum: Chelicerata
- Class: Arachnida
- Order: Araneae
- Infraorder: Mygalomorphae
- Family: Atracidae
- Genus: Hadronyche
- Species: H. lamingtonensis

Binomial name
- Hadronyche lamingtonensis Gray, 2010

Species of spider

Hadronyche lamingtonensis, also known as the Lamington funnel-web spider, is a species of funnel-web spider in the Atracidae family. It is endemic to Australia. It was described in 2010 by Australian arachnologist Michael R. Gray. The species epithet lamingtonensis refers to the Lamington National Park, the type locality.

== Distribution and habitat ==
The species occurs in the border ranges of south-eastern Queensland and north-eastern New South Wales.
