= Hadronyche macquariensis =

Scientific classification
- Domain: Eukaryota
- Kingdom: Animalia
- Phylum: Arthropoda
- Subphylum: Chelicerata
- Class: Arachnida
- Order: Araneae
- Infraorder: Mygalomorphae
- Family: Atracidae
- Genus: Hadronyche
- Species: H. macquariensis

Binomial name
- Hadronyche macquariensis Gray, 2010

Synonyms
- Hadronyche sp. 14

Species of spider

Hadronyche macquariensis, the Port Macquarie funnel-web spider, is a venomous mygalomorph spider, one of a number of species of Australian funnel-web spiders] found in New South Wales.

== Taxonomy ==
Commonly known as the Port Macquarie funnel-web spider, Hadronyche macquariensis was described by Mike Gray in 2010, the holotype male having been collected from Taree, New South Wales in January 1978. Within the genus, it is a member of the infensa group, which contains several described and undescribed species in central New South Wales and southern Queensland. Before its description, it was known as Hadronyche sp. 14.

== Description ==
Like many Australian funnel-web spider species, both sexes of the Port Macquarie funnel-web spider have a shiny black carapace and dark brown to black legs, chelicerae and abdomen. The carapace is slightly longer than it is wide; in the male averages around 0.97 cm long and 0.91 cm wide, and around 1.1 cm long and 0.93 cm wide in the female. The legs of the male are around 3 cm (1.2 in) long each, and the female around 2.5 cm (0.98 in) long. The abdomen is around 1.1 cm long in the male and 1.4 cm long in the female.

== Distribution and habitat ==
The Port Macquarie funnel-web spider is found along the northern coast of New South Wales in eastern Australia, where specimens have been collected from the vicinity of Forster north through Taree, Port Macquarie to Coffs Harbour and Bellingen.

== Toxicity ==
The Port Macquarie funnel-web spider has been responsible for at least one case of serious envenomation out of six bites that can be attributed to it. A six-year-old boy was bitten on the foot in sand dunes near Forster and required hospitalisation and intubation.
