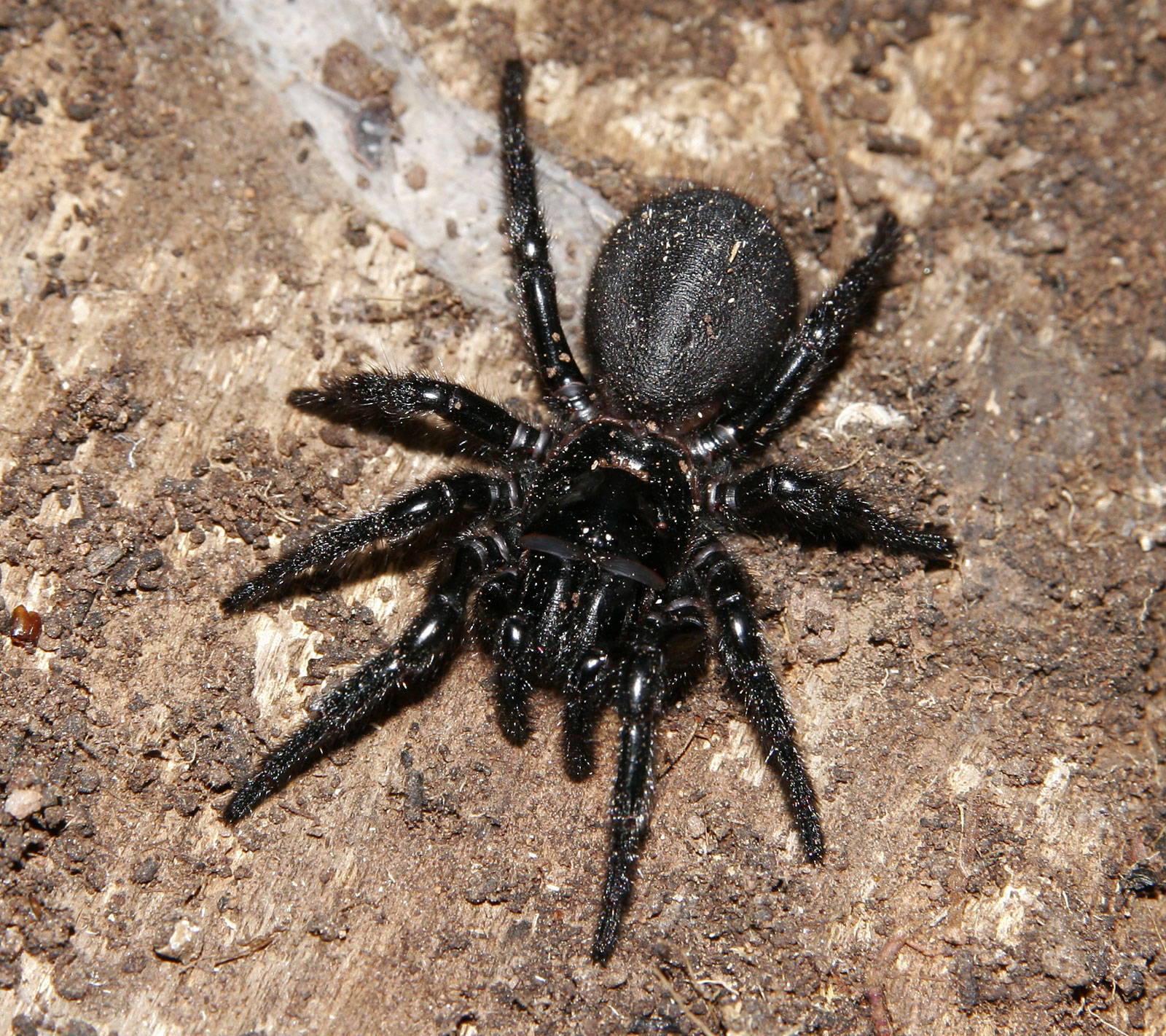

Scientific classification
- Kingdom: Animalia
- Phylum: Arthropoda
- Subphylum: Chelicerata
- Class: Arachnida
- Order: Araneae
- Infraorder: Mygalomorphae
- Family: Atracidae
- Genus: Hadronyche
- Species: H. modesta

Binomial name
- Hadronyche modesta (Simon, 1891)

Synonyms
- Atrax modesta Simon

= Hadronyche modesta =

Victorian funnel-web spider

Species of spider

Hadronyche modesta, the Victorian funnel-web spider, is a species of spider found in Victoria, Australia.

== Taxonomy ==
A member of the genus Hadronyche, the Victorian funnel-web spider was first described in 1891 by Simon in the genus Atrax, having been collected from the vicinity of Melbourne. The type specimen is located in Paris.

== Description ==
A small species compared with other Australian funnel-web spiders, the Victorian funnel-web spider has a similar colouration to most other Australian funnel-web spiders, namely a shiny black carapace and black to dark brown legs and chelicerae, with a matte abdomen with a maroon tinge.

== Distribution and habitat ==
The Victorian funnel-web spider is found in southeastern Australia from the vicinity of Melbourne east through the Dandenong Ranges and East Gippsland.

== Venom ==
Although this species is related to the Sydney funnel-web spider, it has not been implicated in any fatalities or serious envenomations. It is only known to cause general symptoms, such as headaches and nausea.
