= Hadronyche anzses =

Scientific classification
- Kingdom: Animalia
- Phylum: Arthropoda
- Subphylum: Chelicerata
- Class: Arachnida
- Order: Araneae
- Infraorder: Mygalomorphae
- Family: Atracidae
- Genus: Hadronyche
- Species: H. anzses

Binomial name
- Hadronyche anzses Raven, 2000

Species of spider

Hadronyche anzses, also known as the wet tropics funnel-web spider, is a species of funnel-web spider in the Atracidae family. It is endemic to Australia. It was described in 2000 by Australian arachnologist Robert Raven.

== Distribution and habitat ==
The species occurs on the coastal rim of the Mount Carbine Tableland, west of Mossman in Far North Queensland, where it inhabits high altitude rainforest.
