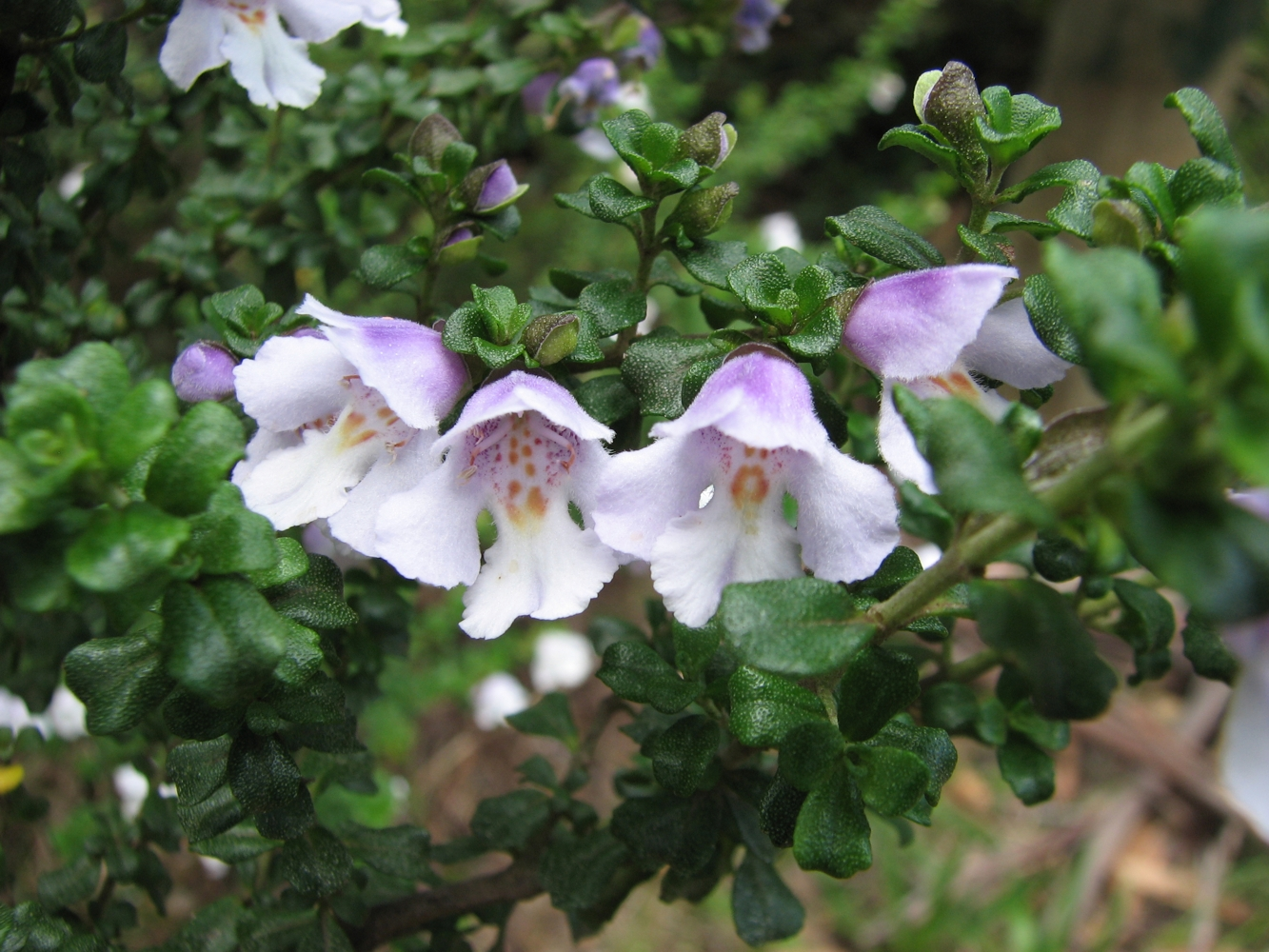
- On Mount Baw Baw

Scientific classification
- Kingdom: Plantae
- Clade: Embryophytes
- Clade: Tracheophytes
- Clade: Spermatophytes
- Clade: Angiosperms
- Clade: Eudicots
- Clade: Asterids
- Order: Lamiales
- Family: Lamiaceae
- Genus: Prostanthera
- Species: P. cuneata

Binomial name
- Prostanthera cuneata Benth.
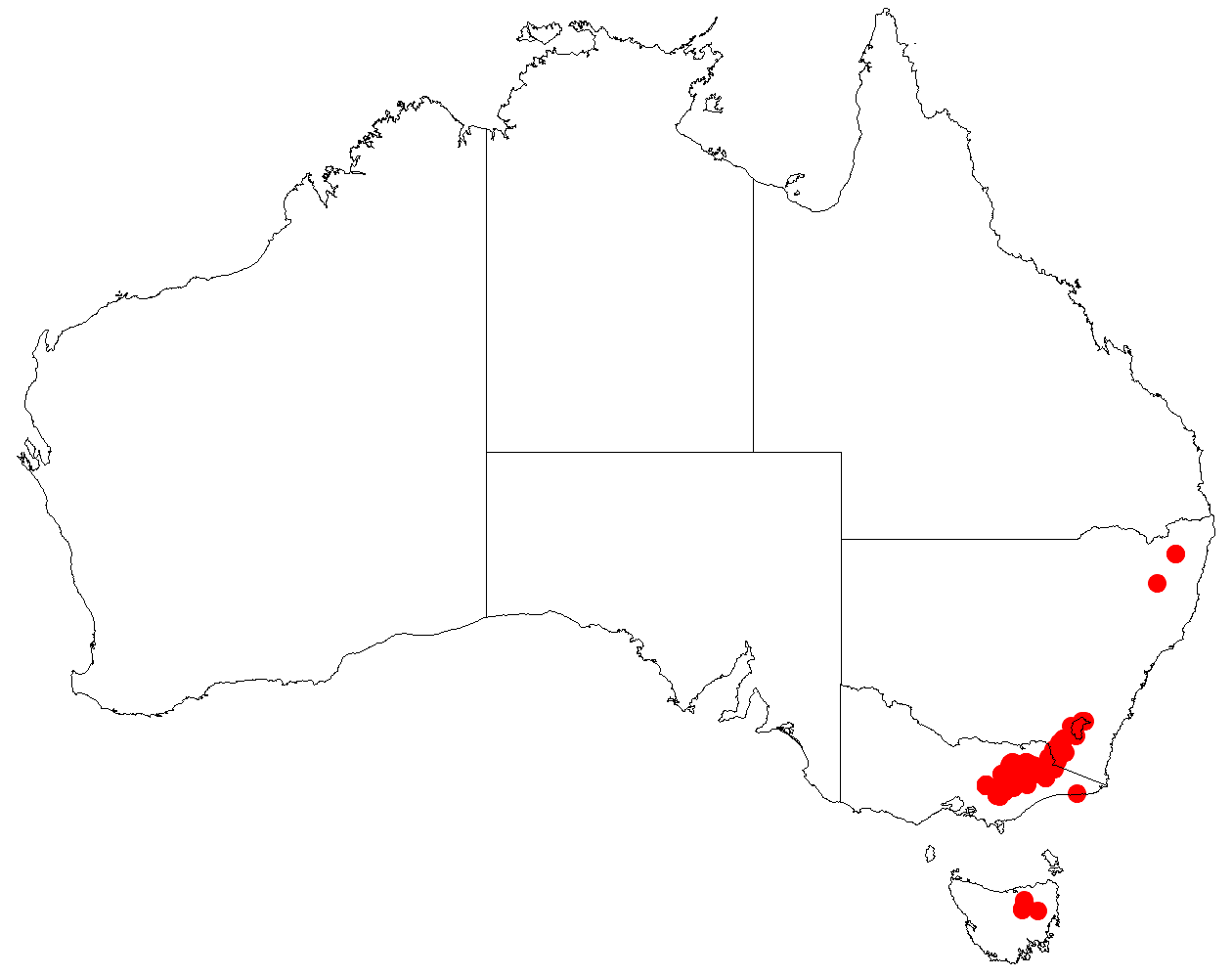
- Occurrence data from AVH

= Prostanthera cuneata =

Alpine mint bush

Species of plant

Prostanthera cuneata, commonly known as alpine mint bush, is a species of flowering plant in the mint family Lamiaceae, and is endemic to mountainous areas of south-eastern continental Australia. It is an erect, compact shrub with egg-shaped leaves with the narrower end towards the base, and pale lavender to almost white flowers with purple blotches.

== Description ==
Prostanthera cuneata is usually an erect, more or less compact shrub that typically grows to a height of 0.5–1.5 m (1 ft 8 in – 4 ft 11 in) but often tending to prostrate as it ages. The branches are more or less cylindrical and covered with white hairs. The leaves are strongly aromatic when crushed, egg-shaped with the lower end towards the base, often appearing wedge-shaped, 4–6 mm (0.16–0.24 in) long, 3.5–5 mm (0.14–0.20 in) wide and sessile or on a petiole up to 0.5 mm (0.020 in) long. The flowers are arranged singly in four to ten leaf axils near the ends of branchlets, each flower on a pedicel 1–2 mm (0.039–0.079 in) long. The sepals are green, usually tinged with purple and form a tube 2.5–3 mm (0.098–0.118 in) wide with two lobes. The lower sepal lobe is 3–4.5 mm (0.12–0.18 in) long and the upper lobe 2.5–4 mm (0.098–0.157 in) long. The petals are pale lavendar to almost white with reddish or purple blotches inside, 9–15 mm (0.35–0.59 in) long, forming a tube 6–8 mm (0.24–0.31 in) long. The lower central lobe is 6.5–9 mm (0.26–0.35 in) long and the upper lobes are 5–6 mm (0.20–0.24 in) long with a central notch 1–2 mm (0.039–0.079 in) long. Flowering occurs from November to April.

== Taxonomy and naming ==
Prostanthera cuneata was first formally described in 1848 by botanist George Bentham in de Candolle's treatise Prodromus Systematis Naturalis Regni Vegetabilis. The specific epithet cuneata means "wedge-shaped".

== Distribution and habitat ==
Alpine mint bush occurs in alpine and subalpine closed heath and shrubland in granite-based soils in New South Wales and Victoria, often in association with snow gums (Eucalyptus pauciflora). In Tasmania, the species is listed as "presumed to be extinct" under the state's Threatened Species Protection Act 1995. In New South Wales it is found south from the Brindabella Range and in north-eastern Victoria at altitudes between about 1,500 and 2,000 m (4,900 and 6,600 ft).

== Use in horticulture ==
In cultivation this plant has gained the Royal Horticultural Society's Award of Garden Merit. It has an RHS hardiness rating of H4 (hardy throughout most of the UK, down to -5°/-10 °C) and is suited to USDA hardiness zones 8 to 9.
