= Hadronyche valida =

Scientific classification
- Kingdom: Animalia
- Phylum: Arthropoda
- Subphylum: Chelicerata
- Class: Arachnida
- Order: Araneae
- Infraorder: Mygalomorphae
- Family: Atracidae
- Genus: Hadronyche
- Species: H. valida

Binomial name
- Hadronyche valida (Rainbow & Pulleine, 1918)

Synonyms
- Atrax valida Rainbow & Pulleine, 1918; Anepsiada ventricosa Rainbow & Pulleine, 1918; Atrax validus Main, 1985

Species of spider

Hadronyche valida, also known as the true funnel-web spider, is a species of funnel-web spider in the Atracidae family. It is endemic to Australia. It was described in 1918 by Australian arachnologists William Joseph Rainbow and Robert Henry Pulleine. The specific epithet valida means ‘true’ or ‘valid’.

== Distribution and habitat ==
The species occurs in the border ranges of north-eastern New South Wales and south-eastern Queensland, where it inhabits closed and open forest habitats.

== Behaviour ==
The spiders construct burrows, especially beneath logs, the entrances to which are lined and extended with silk. They are terrestrial predators of invertebrates and small vertebrates.
