= Hadronyche nadgee =

Scientific classification
- Kingdom: Animalia
- Phylum: Arthropoda
- Subphylum: Chelicerata
- Class: Arachnida
- Order: Araneae
- Infraorder: Mygalomorphae
- Family: Atracidae
- Genus: Hadronyche
- Species: H. nadgee

Binomial name
- Hadronyche nadgee Whitington & Harris, 2021

Species of spider

Hadronyche nadgee is a species of funnel-web spider in the Atracidae family. It is endemic to Australia. It was described in 2021 by Paul Whitington and Kerri-Lee Harris. The species epithet nadgee refers to the Nadgee Nature Reserve which is close to the type locality.

== Distribution and habitat ==
The species occurs in the South East Corner region of New South Wales, where specimens were collected in dry sclerophyll forest.
