= Hadronyche meridiana =

Scientific classification
- Kingdom: Animalia
- Phylum: Arthropoda
- Subphylum: Chelicerata
- Class: Arachnida
- Order: Araneae
- Infraorder: Mygalomorphae
- Family: Atracidae
- Genus: Hadronyche
- Species: H. meridiana

Binomial name
- Hadronyche meridiana Hogg, 1902

Species of spider

Hadronyche meridiana, also known as the Central Victorian funnel-web spider, is a species of funnel-web spider in the Atracidae family. It is endemic to Australia. It was described in 1902 by British arachnologist Henry Roughton Hogg.

== Distribution and habitat ==
The species occurs on the western side of the Great Dividing Range in southern New South Wales and northern Victoria.
