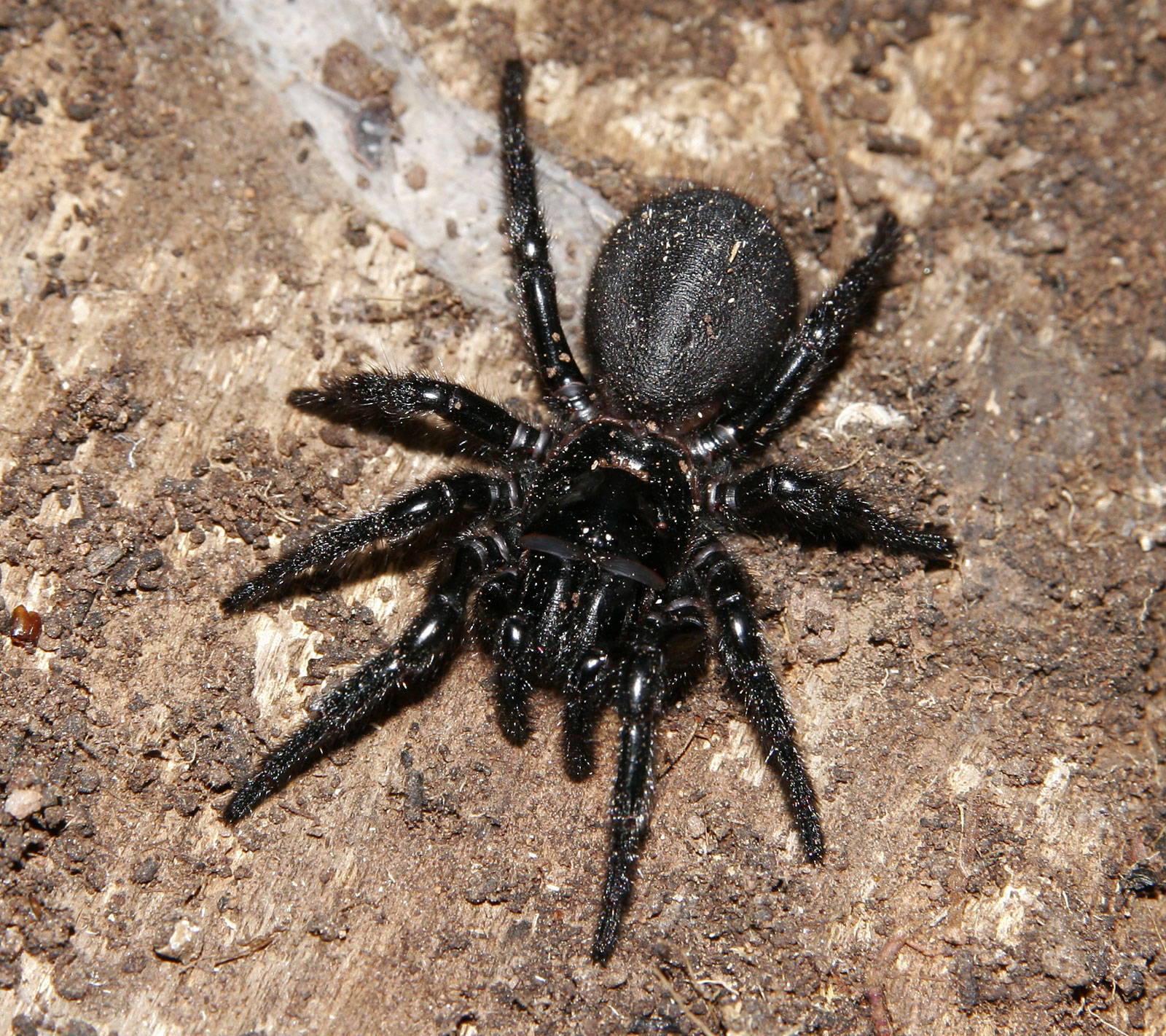
- Hadronyche modesta

Scientific classification
- Kingdom: Animalia
- Phylum: Arthropoda
- Subphylum: Chelicerata
- Class: Arachnida
- Order: Araneae
- Infraorder: Mygalomorphae
- Family: Atracidae
- Genus: Hadronyche; L. Koch, 1873

Type species
- H. cerberea L. Koch, 1873

Species
- 32, see text

Synonyms
- Anepsiada Rainbow & Pulleine, 1918; Pseudatrax Rainbow, 1914; Styphlopis Rainbow, 1913

= Hadronyche =

Genus of spiders

Hadronyche is a genus of venomous Australian funnel-web spiders that was first described by L. Koch in 1873. Originally placed with the curtain web spiders, it was moved to the Hexathelidae in 1980, then to the Atracidae in 2018.

== Description ==
Their size varies significantly, measuring from 1 to 5 cm. Most species in this genus, as most Mygalomorphae, have a glossy black or brown carapace. They have a very long life span for spiders, having been known to live for up to 20 years.

They can be easily identified by the raised morphology of their caput (the front part of the cephalothorax). If identification is not certain, they can be distinguished from Atrax by the unmodified or blunt apophysis in their second tibia, or from Illawarra by the male tarsi, which have two instead of three ventral spine rows.

== Venom ==
While Australian funnel-web spider venom is medically significant, no human fatalities as a result have been recorded since the introduction of antivenom in 1980. The venom profile of this genus is also different from the other genera from the Atracidae family.

== Distribution ==
They are found in eastern Australia from north-east Queensland to Tasmania and the Gulf Ranges region of South Australia. They live primarily in the moist regions and highlands of the east coast, though they are also found in drier open forests in the Western Slopes of the Great Dividing Range and South Australia's gulf ranges.

== Burrows ==
Hadronyche spiders usually make their burrows under rocks or logs, usually in cool humid areas. As with most funnel web spiders, these spiders make funnel shaped webs. The webs have silk trip lines radiating from the entrance which function as a warning system, alerting the spiders to the presence of insect prey or a possible mate. In the case of seasonal rains, the burrows can flood. While these spiders are able to survive submerged for several hours by trapping air bubbles with their hair covered legs beneath their abdomens, prolonged flooding can force them to leave their burrows. They may also leave their burrow to find a mate.

== Species ==
As of September 2026, it contains 33 species, all from Australia:

- Hadronyche adelaidensis (Gray, 1984) – SA
- Hadronyche alpina Gray, 2010 – NSW, ACT, VIC
- Hadronyche annachristiae Gray, 2010 – NSW
- Hadronyche anzses Raven, 2000 – QLD
- Hadronyche cerberea L. Koch, 1873 (type species) – NSW
- Hadronyche emmalizae Gray, 2010 – NSW
- Hadronyche eyrei (Gray, 1984) – SA
- Hadronyche flindersi (Gray, 1984) – SA
- Hadronyche formidabilis (Rainbow, 1914) – QLD, NSW
- Hadronyche infensa (Hickman, 1964) – QLD, NSW
- Hadronyche jensenae Gray, 2010 – VIC
- Hadronyche kaputarensis Gray, 2010 – NSW
- Hadronyche lamingtonensis Gray, 2010 – QLD, NSW
- Hadronyche levittgreggae Gray, 2010 – NSW
- Hadronyche lynabrae Gray, 2010 – NSW
- Hadronyche macquariensis Gray, 2010 – NSW
- Hadronyche marracoonda Gray, 2010 – NSW, ACT
- Hadronyche mascordi Gray, 2010 – NSW
- Hadronyche meridiana Hogg, 1902 – NSW, VIC
- Hadronyche modesta (Simon, 1891) – VIC
- Hadronyche monaro Gray, 2010 – NSW
- Hadronyche monteithi Gray, 2010 – QLD
- Hadronyche nadgee (Whitington & Harris, 2021) – NSW
- Hadronyche nimoola Gray, 2010 – NSW, ACT
- Hadronyche orana Gray, 2010 – NSW
- †Hadronyche pulvinator (Hickman, 1927) – TAS
- Hadronyche raveni Gray, 2010 – QLD
- Hadronyche simonfearni Raven & Douglas, 2025 – TAS
- Hadronyche tambo Gray, 2010 – VIC
- Hadronyche valida (Rainbow & Pulleine, 1918) – QLD, NSW
- Hadronyche venenata (Hickman, 1927) – TAS
- Hadronyche versuta (Rainbow, 1914) – NSW
- Hadronyche walkeri Gray, 2010 – NSW
