= Hi1a =

Peptide toxin from spiders

Hi1a is a peptide from the venom of the Darling Downs funnel-web spider (Hadronyche infensa) which researchers have found, in studies done on mice, to be an acid-sensing ion channel 1a (ASIC1a) inhibitor. It has cardioprotective properties - preventing heart tissue from degradation during a heart attack and also has a highly neuroprotective effect in case of stroke. It is being studied for its potential use for acute ischemic events by preventing cell death.
