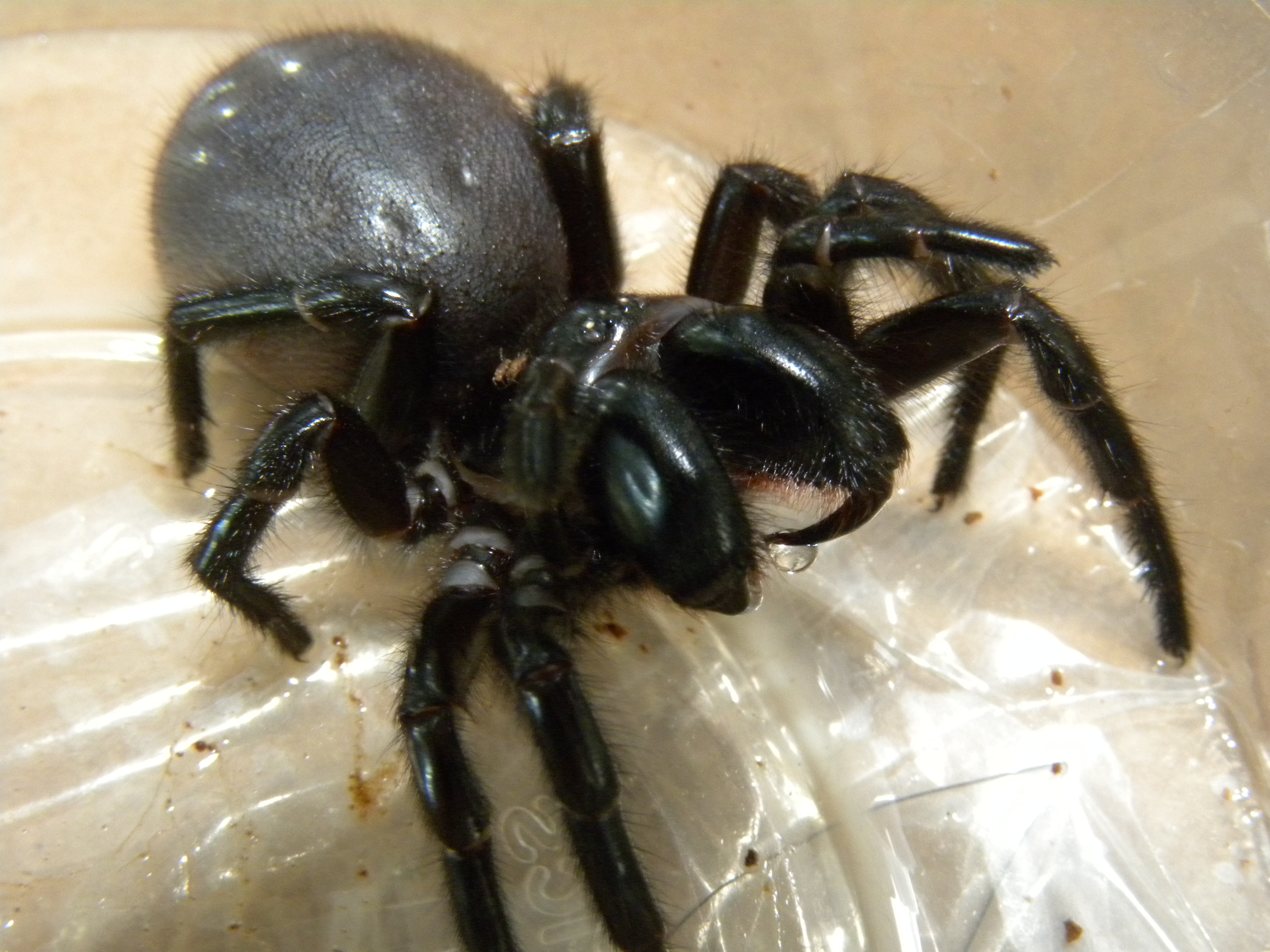

Scientific classification
- Domain: Eukaryota
- Kingdom: Animalia
- Phylum: Arthropoda
- Subphylum: Chelicerata
- Class: Arachnida
- Order: Araneae
- Infraorder: Mygalomorphae
- Family: Atracidae
- Genus: Hadronyche
- Species: H. cerberea

Binomial name
- Hadronyche cerberea Koch, 1873

= Hadronyche cerberea =

Species of spider

Hadronyche cerberea, the southern tree-dwelling funnel-web spider, is an extremely venomous mygalomorph spider found in central New South Wales, Australia.

== Taxonomy and naming ==
German naturalist Ludwig Koch described the southern tree-dwelling funnel-web spider from a female spider collected in Sydney, and erected the genus Hadronyche in 1873. The type specimen was housed at the State Museum of Natural History Stuttgart and destroyed during bombing in World War II. A neotype was subsequently selected in 2010 and is housed at the Australian Museum in Sydney.

== Description ==
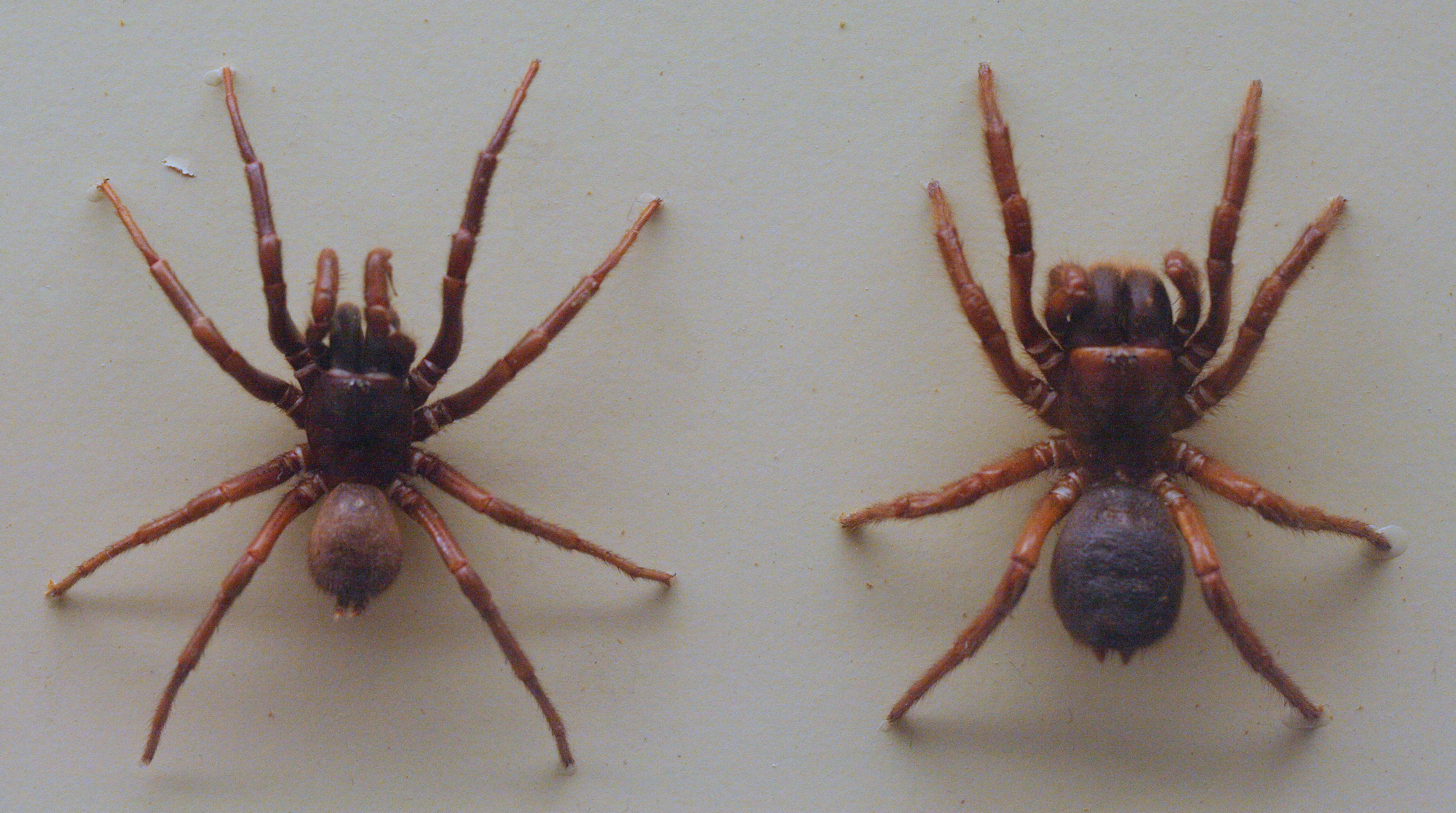
Male and female funnel-web spider specimens on display in the Australian Museum

The southern tree-dwelling funnel-web spider has a glossy black carapace, matte black or dark brown chelicerae and legs, and a light maroon-brown to dark brown abdomen.

== Distribution and habitat ==
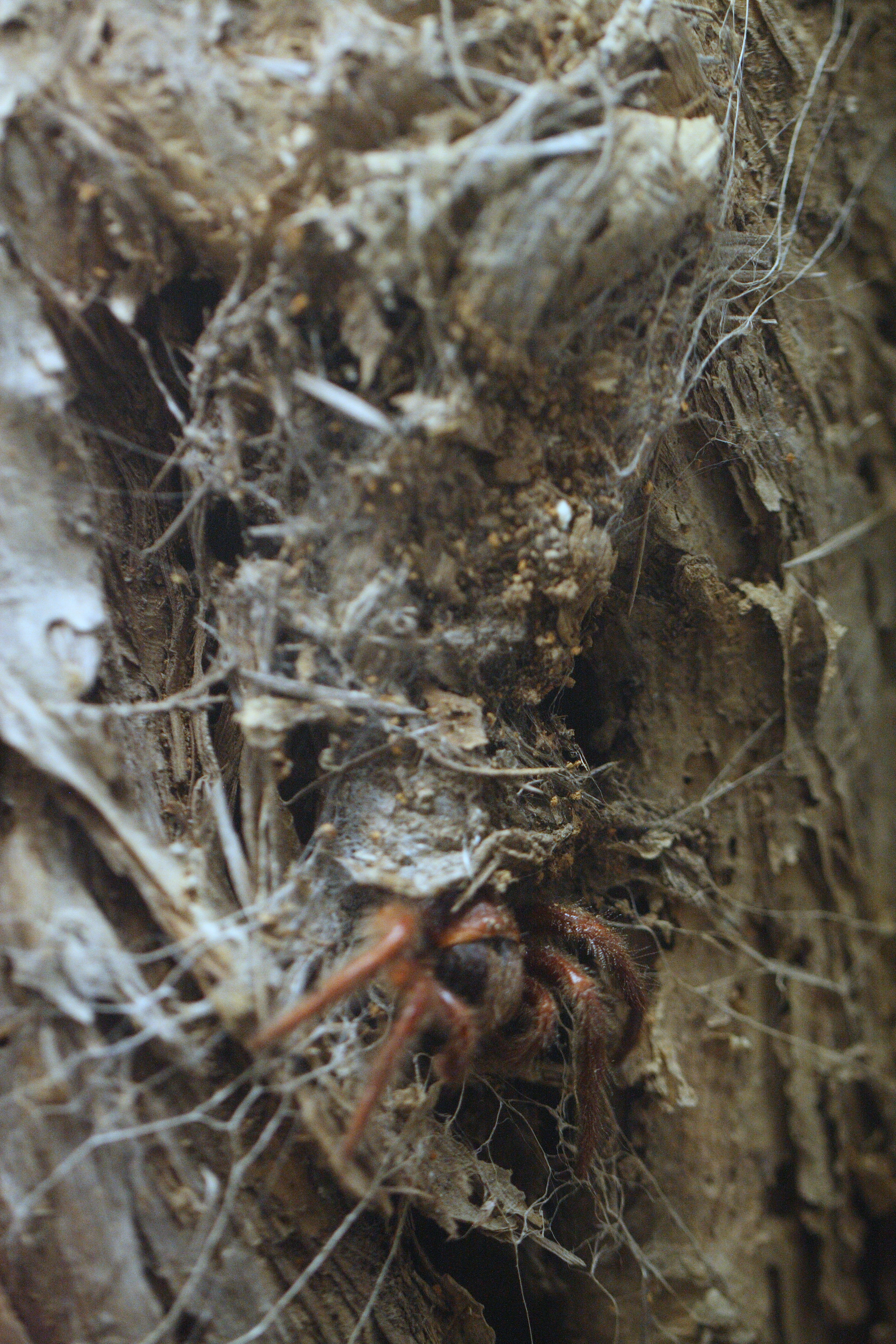
A female in its funnel on a tree stump, displayed in the Australian Museum

The southern tree-dwelling funnel-web spider is found in eastern Australia from the Hunter River in central New South Wales to southern New South Wales. This and the northern tree-dwelling funnel-web spider (Hadronyche formidabilis) are the only two species of Australian funnel-web spiders that live predominantly in trees.

It inhabits dry sclerophyll forest.

In Tallaganda National Park and its surrounds in southeastern New South Wales, the southern tree-dwelling funnel-web spider co-occurs with the funnel-web species Atrax sutherlandi, which burrows exclusively in the soil, in contrast with the former species' preference for logs. Genetic analysis shows that the southern tree-dwelling funnel-web spider has recently rapidly spread through the area.

== Toxicity ==
A high proportion of bites from the southern tree-dwelling funnel-web spider—three out of four recorded cases—result in severe symptoms of envenomation, a higher proportion of bites than even the Sydney funnel-web spider. The venom can be successfully treated with the antivenom for the related Sydney funnel-web spider (Atrax robustus).

The venom of Hadronyche cerberea contains the peptide Hc3a.

Symptoms of envenomation can occur within 15–20 minutes. Applying pressure and a tourniquet can significantly delay the onset of symptoms and remains a critical part of the management of an Australian funnel-web spider bite. Despite the venom lacking the atraxotoxin or atraxin of A. robustus, the symptoms are very similar to those from a Sydney funnel-web spider bite. Common symptoms include diaphoresis (profuse sweating), hypertension (elevated blood pressure), sinus tachycardia (elevated heart rate), nausea, vomiting and local pain at the bite site. Pulmonary oedema (fluid build-up in the lungs) often comes on early.
