= Illawarra wisharti =

Scientific classification
- Kingdom: Animalia
- Phylum: Arthropoda
- Subphylum: Chelicerata
- Class: Arachnida
- Order: Araneae
- Infraorder: Mygalomorphae
- Family: Atracidae
- Genus: Illawarra; Gray, 2010
- Species: I. wisharti

Binomial name
- Illawarra wisharti Gray, 2010

Genus of spiders

Illawarra wisharti, the Illawarra funnel-web spider, is a species of Australian funnel-web spiders. It is the only species in the monotypic genus Illawarra. The genus and species were first described by Michael R. Gray in 2010. It has only been found in the Illawarra region of southern New South Wales. The generic name comes from the Illawarra region where the spider was found. The species name wisharti honours Graeme Wishart, who collected many mygalomorph spiders in that region.

== Description ==
Mature males have an overall body length of about 15 millimetres (0.59 in), with the carapace and abdomen being of roughly equal length. The carapace length averages about 8 millimetres (0.31 in), with a range of 7 to 10 millimetres (0.28 to 0.39 in). The fourth pair of legs is the longest at about 23 millimetres (0.91 in) in total. Individuals are basically brown, with an obvious pattern of narrow chevrons on the abdomen. Females are of a similar size and overall appearance. They are said to have an "ant-like" smell.

Males differ from those of other atracids by the presence of a broad row of spines in the middle of the underside (ventral side) of the tarsi of all four pairs of legs. Females can be distinguished by the first leg, which lacks spines, has the metatarsus partly fused to the tarsus, and also has enlarged tarsal claws.

It is a fossorial species, residing in burrows under leaf litter and rocks.

=== Venom ===
A study of the peptides in atracine spider venom in 2001 found that Illawarra wisharti venom had a similar profile to that of Atrax robustus, a species known to have caused dangerous envenomation effects in humans. However, I. wisharti is not one of the six atracine species listed as dangerous.
