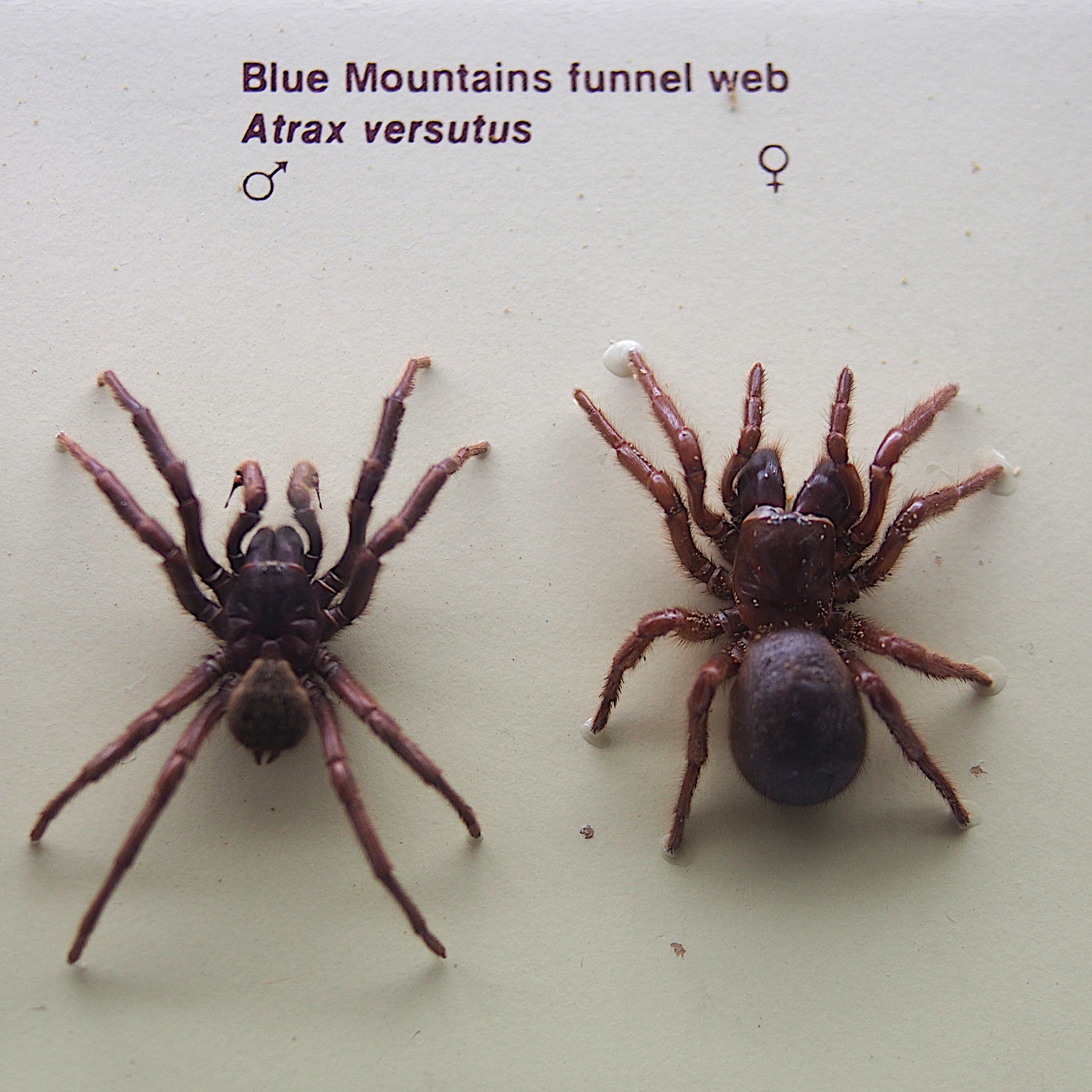
- Male (left) and female (right) Blue Mountains funnel-web spiders (Hadronyche versuta)

Scientific classification
- Kingdom: Animalia
- Phylum: Arthropoda
- Subphylum: Chelicerata
- Class: Arachnida
- Order: Araneae
- Infraorder: Mygalomorphae
- Family: Atracidae
- Genus: Hadronyche
- Species: H. versuta

Binomial name
- Hadronyche versuta (Rainbow, 1914)

Synonyms
- Atrax versuta Rainbow; Aname bicolor Rainbow; Pseudatrax moreaui Rainbow; Atrax bicolor Hickman; Atrax moreaui Main

= Hadronyche versuta =

Species of spider

Hadronyche versuta, the Blue Mountains funnel-web spider, is a venomous mygalomorph spider found in central New South Wales.

== Taxonomy ==
A member of the genus Hadronyche, the Blue Mountains funnel-web spider was first described in 1914, by William Joseph Rainbow in the genus Atrax, having been collected from the vicinity of the Jenolan Caves. The species name is derived from the Latin versutus "clever/cunning".

== Description ==
The Blue Mountains funnel-web spider has a similar colouration to most other Australian funnel-web spiders, namely a shiny black carapace and black to dark brown legs and chelicerae. The abdomen of the male has a pale dorsal patch, and that of the female is maroon-brown. The carapace in the male is slightly longer than wide and is roughly square in the female.

== Distribution and habitat ==
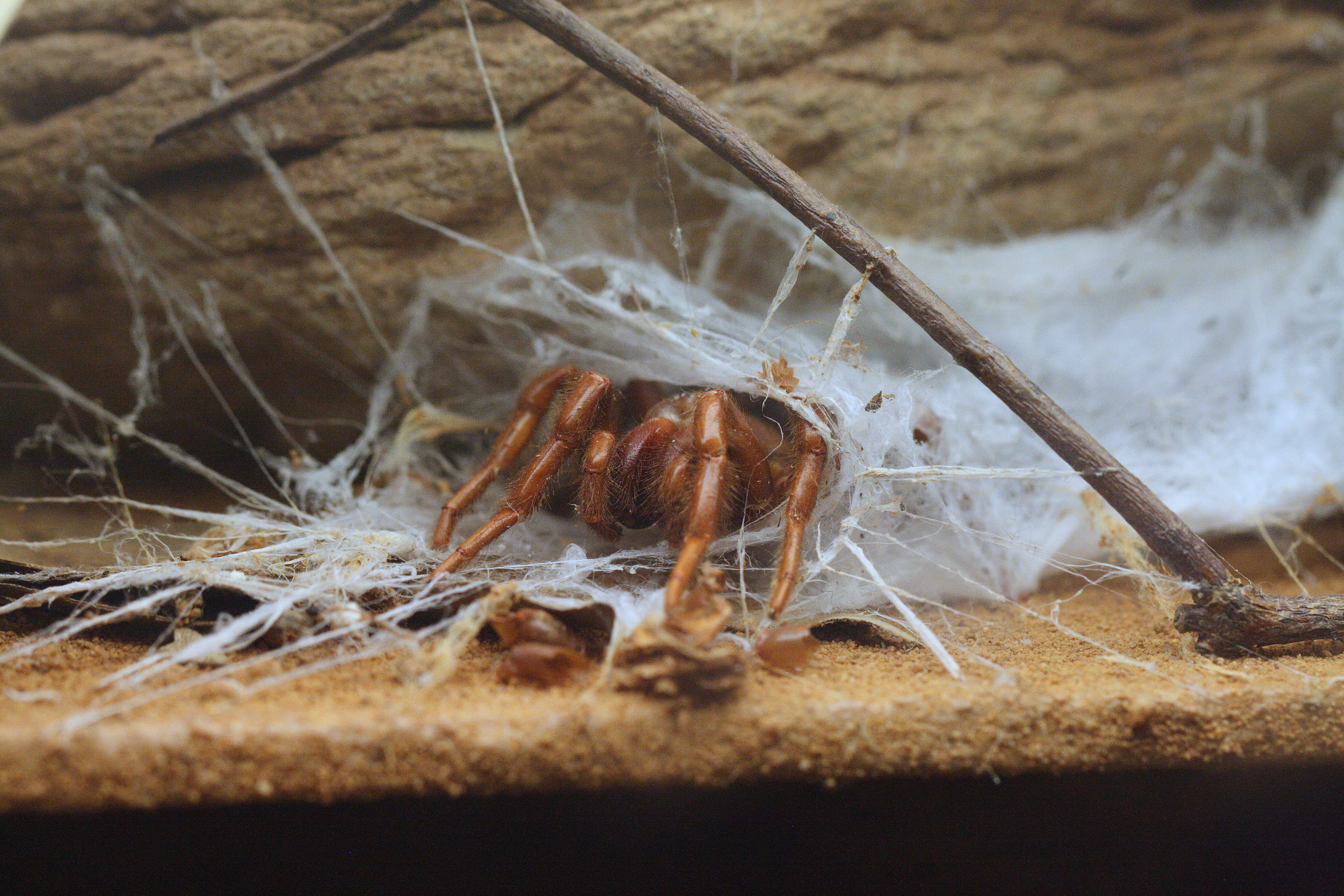
Specimen in its funnel-web on display at the Australian Museum

The Blue Mountains funnel-web spider is found in eastern Australia from the Blue Mountains to Illawarra District in New South Wales. Its burrows are found in stumps and rotten logs.

== Toxicity ==
One out of nine recorded cases of being bitten by a Blue Mountains funnel-web spider has resulted in severe symptoms of envenomation. The bite can be successfully treated with the antivenom for the related Sydney funnel-web spider (Atrax robustus). Symptoms of envenomation can occur within 15–20 minutes. Applying pressure bandage similar to snake bite treatment can significantly delay the onset of symptoms and remains a critical part of the management of an Australian funnel-web spider bite. Despite the venom lacking the atraxotoxin or atraxin of A. robustus, the symptoms are very similar to those from a Sydney funnel-web spider bite. Features of envenomation include diaphoresis, local pain at the bite site, pulmonary oedema, hypertension, nausea and vomiting.

Females are suspected of being more venomous than males, possibly because they inject larger amounts of venom. Versutoxin, a neurotoxin very similar to robustoxin produced by the Sydney funnel-web spider, induces an autonomic storm in the victim.
