= Threatened Species Protection Act 1995 =

Act of the Parliament of Tasmania, Australia

Parliament of Tasmania
- Long title: An Act to provide for the protection and management of threatened native flora and fauna and to enable and promote the conservation of native flora and fauna.
- Enacted by: Parliament of Tasmania
- Enacted: 14 November 1995
- Royal assent: 14 November 1995
- Commenced: 14 November 1995
- Administered by: Department of Primary Industries, Parks, Water and Environment (Tasmania)
- Status: In force

The Threatened Species Protection Act 1995 (TSP Act), is an act of the Parliament of Tasmania that provides the statute relating to conservation of flora and fauna. Its long title is An Act to provide for the protection and management of threatened native flora and fauna and to enable and promote the conservation of native flora and fauna. It received the royal assent on 14 November 1995.

As of 25 November 2020, the TSP Act is administered by the Department of Primary Industries, Parks, Water and Environment (Tasmania) and is the primary legislation for the listing, protection and conservation of threatened native flora and fauna in Tasmania. Threatened species in Tasmania can also be listed on the Environment Protection and Biodiversity Conservation Act 1999, which is the primary national legislation for the protection of threatened species in Australia.

The objectives of the TSP Act are to ensure the survival of native flora and fauna as well to encourage, educate and assist the Tasmanian community and relevant landowners to engage in the conservation and protection of endemic flora and fauna.

== Listing process ==
For a species to be eligible for listing on the Act, it must be considered to be a native Tasmanian flora or fauna. Alongside Tasmania's endemic flora and fauna, The Threatened Species Protection Amendment Act 2001 adjusted the definition of native flora and fauna to allow the listing and protection of migrant species, as well as vagrant or hybrid species if deemed appropriate by the Scientific Advisory Committee.

If a species is eligible for protection under the TSP Act, any person may submit a form nominating that species for listing or delisting. Upon receiving a nomination, the Scientific Advisory Committee decides whether the species meet the legislative guidelines and must publish an initial decision within 12 months. This initial decision is then published in the Tasmanian Government Gazette and several Tasmanian newspapers so that comment can be made. After this 30-day period, any comment or scientific advice received is used to synthesise a final decision. The Minister for Environment Parks must inform the public of this decision to make an Order under the Act in the Gazette and newspapers. An Order under the TSP Act may seek to list, delist or alter the status of one or more species. As of 25 November 2020, there have been 22 Threatened Species Protection Orders enacted.

== Assessing threatened species ==
=== Scientific Advisory Committee ===
The assessment of nominations for the listing or delisting of species under the TSP Act is overseen by the Scientific Advisory Committee (Threatened Species). The Scientific Advisory Committee (SAC) is a body provided for by the TSP Act, whose function is to make recommendations to the Minister and Secretary of Primary Industries and Water on the listing and delisting of species. As well as suggesting amendments to the TSP Act and providing expert advice on the management of conservation and threatening processes in Tasmania. The SAC is composed of seven experts from various fields, whose collective expertise must include: vertebrate and invertebrate fauna, vascular and non-vascular flora, taxonomy, and the fields of marine, freshwater, terrestrial and population ecology.

=== Categorisation of taxa ===
The assessment guidelines for the TSP Act were devised with several major taxonomic groups in mind: vertebrate and invertebrate fauna, vascular and non-vascular flora, fungi and marine species. However, when listed, taxa are placed into one of four groups: vertebrate fauna, invertebrate fauna, vascular flora or non-vascular flora.

=== Threat levels ===
If a species is approved for listing on the TSP Act, they are placed in one of five categories depending on how the circumstances of that species' population meet certain thresholds of endangerment:

==== Criterion 1 – endangered ====
An extant taxon of native flora or fauna may be listed as endangered if it is in danger of extinction because long-term survival is unlikely while the factors causing it to be endangered continue operating."

==== Criterion 2 – endangered (presumed extinct) ====
A taxon of native flora or fauna may be listed as endangered because it is presumed to be extinct on the ground that no occurrence of the taxon in the wild can be confirmed during the past 50 years."

==== Criterion 3 – vulnerable ====
A taxon of native flora or fauna may be listed as vulnerable if it is likely to become an endangered taxon while the factors causing it to be vulnerable continue operating."

==== Criterion 4 – rare ====
A taxon of native flora or fauna may be listed as rare if it has a small population in Tasmania that is not endangered or vulnerable but is at risk."

==== Criterion 5 – taxa below the level of subspecies ====
A taxon of native flora or fauna which is below the level of sub-species and which is narrowly defined owing to its taxonomic position, environmental conditions or geography may be listed only if, in addition to the requirements of this section, there is a special need to conserve it in Tasmania."

=== Application of the IUCN Red List in Tasmania ===
These levels of threat, along with the assessment processes of the TSP Act are largely structured around the International Union for Conservation of Nature (IUCN) Red List framework. The IUCN Red List is often used by national or regional bodies when constructing conservation management frameworks. It aims to provide an efficient mechanism for the objective classification of taxa to a threat level based upon certain thresholds of population decline. This objective process is enabled by removing expert opinion from the final classification of a species, which is done using data analysis to determine extinction risk. The IUCN framework instead uses expert knowledge to inform the process of mapping, listing and conservation, but aims to remove any subjective opinion from the final decision.

There are several major challenges faced when applying the IUCN Red List at a regional level, and the IUCN offer insight into how it should best be approached. If a region is isolated, and minimal migration of fauna occurs across borders of management, then the region may utilise the Red List criteria in a global context. However, the movement of taxa, particularly fauna, across borders and between regions of different authority, can be a substantial challenge in accurately listing population size, especially when endemic and introduced species and their breeding and non-breeding members are considered. The IUCN recommends that firstly a species' population and risk is assessed within the regional area, and after an initial classification is made, extraneous global factors should be used to adjust the classification if needed. Since Tasmania is an island, with many endemic species of flora and fauna, it is in an advantageous position to adopt the IUCN Red List Framework.

The levels of threat on the TSP Act differ from the Red List slightly; where the Red List has a distinction between "Endangered" and "Critically Endangered", the TSP Act just has a broader Endangered category. The TSP Act also uses the category "Rare", which is not used on the Red List. All taxa within a certain category are provided the same level of protection under the law, however conservatory action is taken subjective to the needs of an individual species.

IUCN Red List Categories

== Threatened species in Tasmania ==
As of November 25, 2020, there are 681 species listed on the TSP Act. Of these, 121 are vulnerable, 313 are rare, 220 are endangered and 27 are now extinct. There are a further 39 Tasmanian native species listed on the EPBC Act that are not listed on the TSP Act. The EPBC Act uses the criteria: conservation dependant, vulnerable, endangered, critically endangered, extinct and extinct in the wild. Of these Tasmanian species listed on the EPBC Act, 7 are conservation dependant, 21 are vulnerable, 8 are endangered, and 3 are critically endangered.

=== Extinctions ===
Australia has one of the highest extinction rates of native animals in the world. This is due to many factors, however, the greatest contributors are invasive species, variations and increases in the number and severity of bushfires and the loss of at least 33% of Australia's vegetation and native habitat. Since the European settlement of Australia, the extinction of at least 90 species has occurred; of these species, 27 were native to Tasmania, 19 flora and 8 fauna. The most notable of these extinctions is that of the Tasmanian tiger (Thylacine).

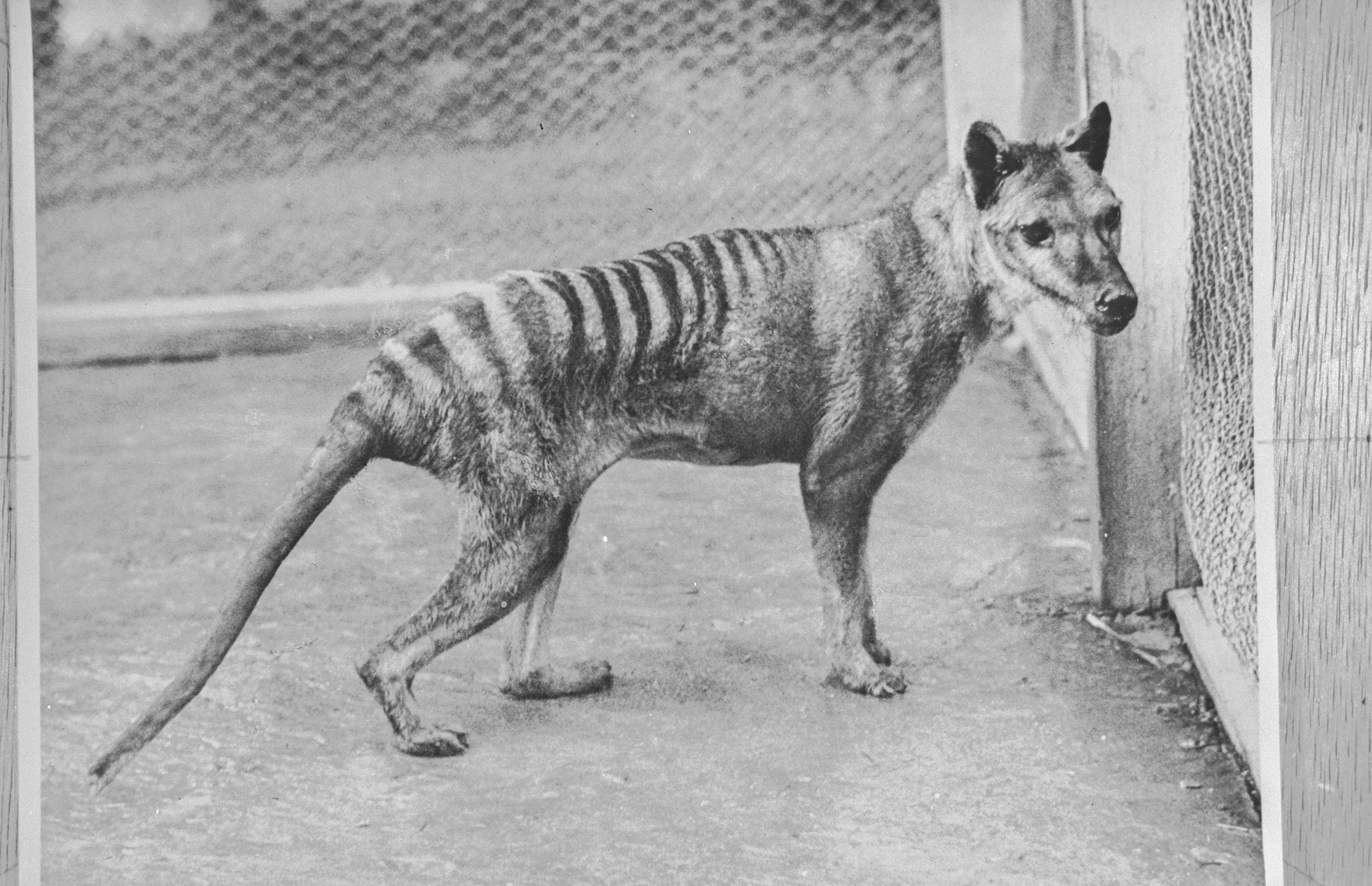
Thylacine at Beaumaris Zoo, 1936

Extinct Tasmanian flora and fauna
Species	Common name	Classification
Ballantinia antipoda	Southern shepherds purse	Flora, vascular
Banksia integrifolia subsp. integrifolia	Coast banksia	Flora, vascular
Botrychium australe	Parsley fern	Flora, vascular
Caladenia cardiochila	Heartlip spider-orchid	Flora, vascular
Chenopodium erosum	Papery goosefoot	Flora, vascular
Coopernookia barbata	Purple native-primrose	Flora, vascular
Deyeuxia lawrencei	Lawrences bentgrass	Flora, vascular
Hibbertia obtusifolia	Grey guineaflower	Flora, vascular
Lepilaena australis	Southern watermat	Flora, vascular
Levenhookia dubia	Hairy stylewort	Flora, vascular
Myriophyllum glomeratum	Clustered watermilfoil	Flora, vascular
Ozothamnus selaginoides	Table Mountain everlasting bush	Flora, vascular
Podotheca angustifolia	Sticky longheads	Flora, vascular
Prostanthera cuneata	Alpine mintbush	Flora, vascular
Senecio georgianus	Grey groundsel	Flora, vascular
Senecio macrocarpus	Largefruit fireweed	Flora, vascular
Thesium australe	Southern toadflax	Flora, vascular
Thynninorchis huntiana	Elbow orchid	Flora, vascular
Punctelia subflava	N/A	Flora, non-vascular
Costora iena	Caddis fly (Great Lakes)	Fauna, invertebrate
Hadronyche pulvinator	Cascade funnel-web spider	Fauna, invertebrate
Hypolimnus pedderensis	Lake Pedder earthworm	Fauna, invertebrate
Cyanoramphus novaezelandiae erythrotis	Macquarie Island parakeet	Fauna, vertebrate
Dromaius ater	King Island emu	Fauna, vertebrate
Dromaius novaehollandiae diemenensis	Tasmanian emu	Fauna, vertebrate
Gallirallus philippensis macquariensis	Macquarie Island rail	Fauna, vertebrate
Thylacinus cynocephalus	Thylacine	Fauna, vertebrate

== Offences under the act ==
Licences and permits can be obtained to take, trade in, keep, move, process, or distribute listed flora or fauna in line with the act, failure to use this licence or permit within the constraints of the TSP Act is an offence. It is an offence under the TSP Act if a person without a licence or permit knowingly takes, keeps, trades in, or processes a listed species, or disturbs in any way a listed species on land that is subject to an interim protection order, land management agreement or conservation covenant. Furthermore, a person may not release or abandon a listed species into the wild.

If the listed flora or fauna occurs within a domestic garden, or is encountered whilst a person is acting under a certified forest practices plan, public authority management agreement or dam works in line with the Water Management act 1999, the interference or taking of a listed species is not considered an offence.

== Amendments ==
As of 25 November 2020, the TSP Act has received two amendment acts. The Threatened Species Protection Amendment Act 2001 dealt with minor changes to word phrasing, definitions and offences. It received the Royal Assent on 17 December 2001. The Threatened Species Protection Amendment Act 2018 amended the penalties for some offences under the act. It received the Royal Assent on 10 September 2018.

== Challenges and efficacy ==
Some significant challenges are faced in accurately mapping habitats and assessing a species level of threat due to their inhabited environment, this occurs both in the marine and terrestrial settings.

A small amount of historical reference data on population, combined with the inability to accurately and efficiently map species numbers and distribution in the marine environment, results in unabated species decline going unregistered. Marine species of flora and fauna are underrepresented on the TSP Act when compared with terrestrial taxa. This is most likely due to the marine environment being obscured from public view and mapping and assessment of marine taxa requiring considerably more time and resources when compared with terrestrial mapping. However, marine vertebrates are represented in greater number than their terrestrial counterparts, this may be explained by their low repopulation rates, being a target of hunting and fishing, and their exposure to both marine and terrestrial impacts.

The category of non-vascular flora, largely lichens, is also significantly underrepresented. Similarly to the marine environment, the obscure and hidden nature of non-vascular flora makes them very difficult to sample and obtain accurate population information. There is a lack of expert knowledge for these taxa in Tasmania, and consequently, the protection of these species often relies on the vascular plants of their habitat being protected. Similar discrepancies are also seen on the EPBC Act, where "birds, amphibians and mammals have high levels of threatened species (12–24%) but < 6% of all reptiles and plants and < 0.01% of invertebrates and fish are considered threatened."

Sampling of species' populations and habitats, particularly invertebrate fauna, has historically been conducted with a single species sampling approach in Tasmania. This aims to give policy makers and landowners relevant information to manage native species' habitats. This approach to sampling is highly beneficial for invertebrate conservation, as it provides a greater depth of knowledge regarding the habitat and population of a given taxon. The challenge of using assessments with such a focused nature is that with the limited resources for conservation of these taxa in Tasmania, this approach to sampling struggles to efficiently gather enough information for landowners to make management decisions. It also struggles to maximise the amount of species receiving population and habitat mapping, and consequently, conservatory action. It has been suggested that groups of taxa, rather than individual species should be sampled in a habitat to allow better land management direction.

== See also ==
- Environment Protection and Biodiversity Conservation Act 1999, federal legislation
- Wildlife Conservation Act 1950, Western Australian legislation
- NSW Threatened Species Conservation Act 1995 (TSC Act), New South Wales legislation
