= Vernon Victor Hickman =

Australian zoologist, arachnologist (1894–1984)

Vernon Victor Hickman OBE
- Born: 28 August 1894; Hobart, Tasmania, Australia
- Died: 1984 (aged 89–90); New Town, Tasmania, Australia
- Education: University of Tasmania, DSc (1937)
- Employer: University of Tasmania
- Known for: Arachnology

Vernon Victor Hickman (28 August 1894 – 1984) was an entomologist, born and resident in Tasmania, who became a leading authority on the spiders of Australia.

The genus Hickmania and its formerly recognised family Hickmaniidae were named in tribute to the author. In 1979 Hickman was awarded the title Officer of the Order of the British Empire (OBE) "for service to zoological science and education". Hickman was proudest of the Anders Retzius medal, awarded in 1951, but said to be modest regarding his other achievements.

Hickman, born in Hobart on 28 August 1894, was the eldest son of Pauline née Patterson and her husband, George Milford Hickman, a Tasmanian storekeeper. He was educated at the University of Tasmania and briefly lectured before enlisting to serve in first world war, returning from the experience of the Western Front with a psychological impact that remained throughout his life.

An early interest in invertebrates began with studies of Anaspides tasmaniae, known as the mountain shrimp, before pursuing a major focus on arachnology. Hickman's knowledge encompassed other organisms, including mammals, and was extended through lectures and chairs held throughout his career.
