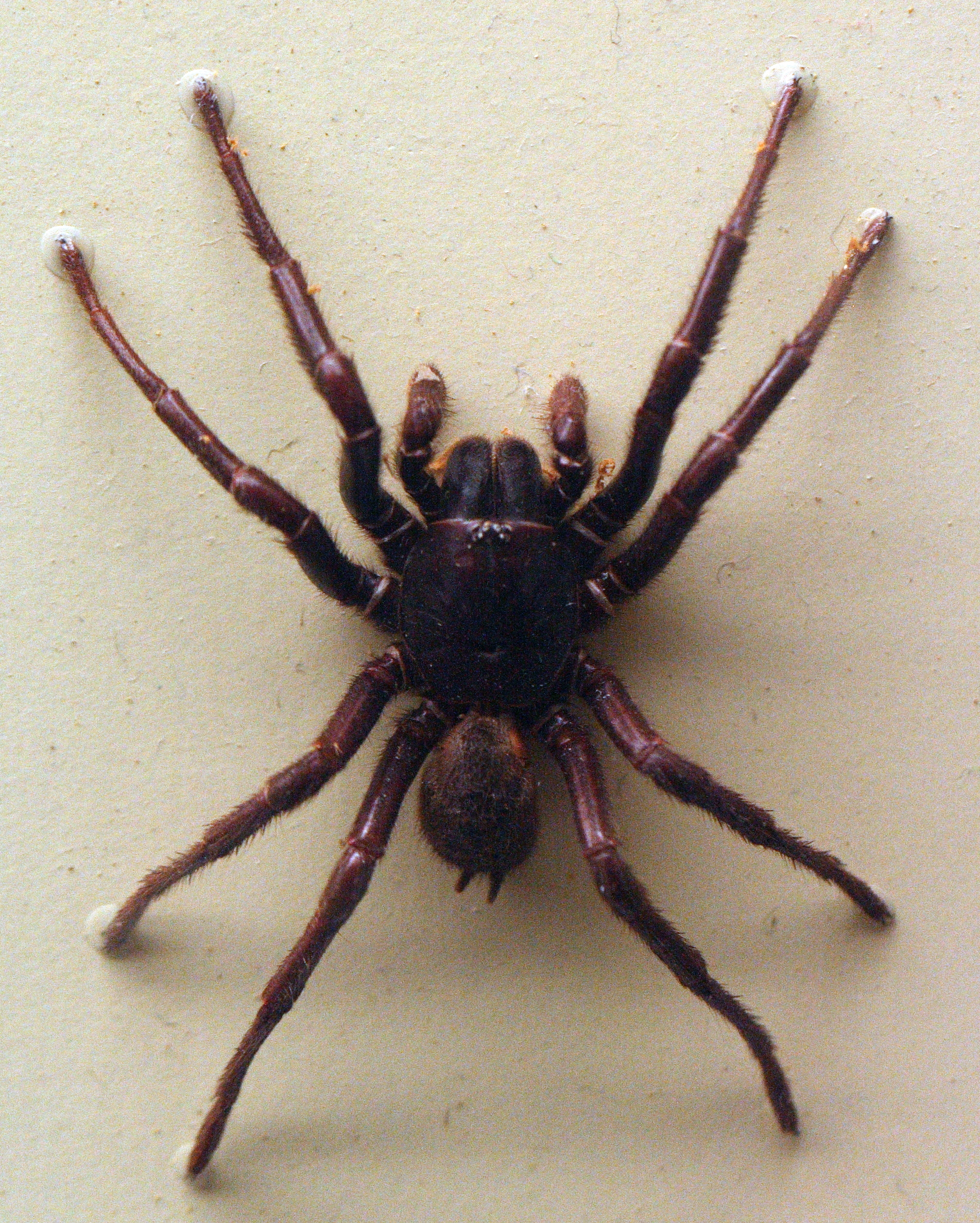
- male specimen on display at the Australian Museum

Scientific classification
- Kingdom: Animalia
- Phylum: Arthropoda
- Subphylum: Chelicerata
- Class: Arachnida
- Order: Araneae
- Infraorder: Mygalomorphae
- Family: Atracidae
- Genus: Hadronyche
- Species: H. infensa

Binomial name
- Hadronyche infensa (Hickman, 1964)

Synonyms
- Atrax infensus Hickman

= Hadronyche infensa =

Species of spider

Hadronyche infensa, the Darling Downs funnel-web spider, is a venomous mygalomorph spider, one of a number of Australian funnel-web spiders found in Queensland and New South Wales.

== Taxonomy ==
The Darling Downs funnel-web spider was described by Hickman in 1964 as Atrax infensus before being moved to the genus Hadronyche in 1988. The type specimen is a male spider that was collected in Toowoomba, Queensland, in 1963. Within the genus, it is a member of the infensa group, which contains several described and undescribed species in central New South Wales and southern Queensland.

== Description ==
Like many Australian funnel-web spider species, both sexes of the Darling Downs funnel-web spider have a shiny black carapace and dark brown to black legs, chelicera and abdomen. The carapace is longer than it is wide. The abdomen of the male has a pale patch underneath.

== Distribution and habitat ==
The Darling Downs funnel-web spider is found in eastern Australia, ranging from southeast Queensland to the northeastern portion of New South Wales.

== Toxicity ==
The venom of male and female Darling Downs funnel-web spiders is of equal toxicity. Two out of 14 recorded cases of being bitten by a Darling Downs funnel-web spider have resulted in severe symptoms of envenomation. Bites from female spiders have also resulted in milder cases of envenomation. The venom can be successfully treated with the antivenom for the related Sydney funnel-web spider (Atrax robustus).

The venom of the Darling Downs funnel-web spider becomes more toxic in early summer, after the spider has been fasting over the winter. Male Darling Downs funnel-web spiders at this time are mobile and searching for a mate, meaning that people are more at risk of encountering them and being bitten.
