= Michael R. Gray =

Australian arachnologist (1941- 2023)

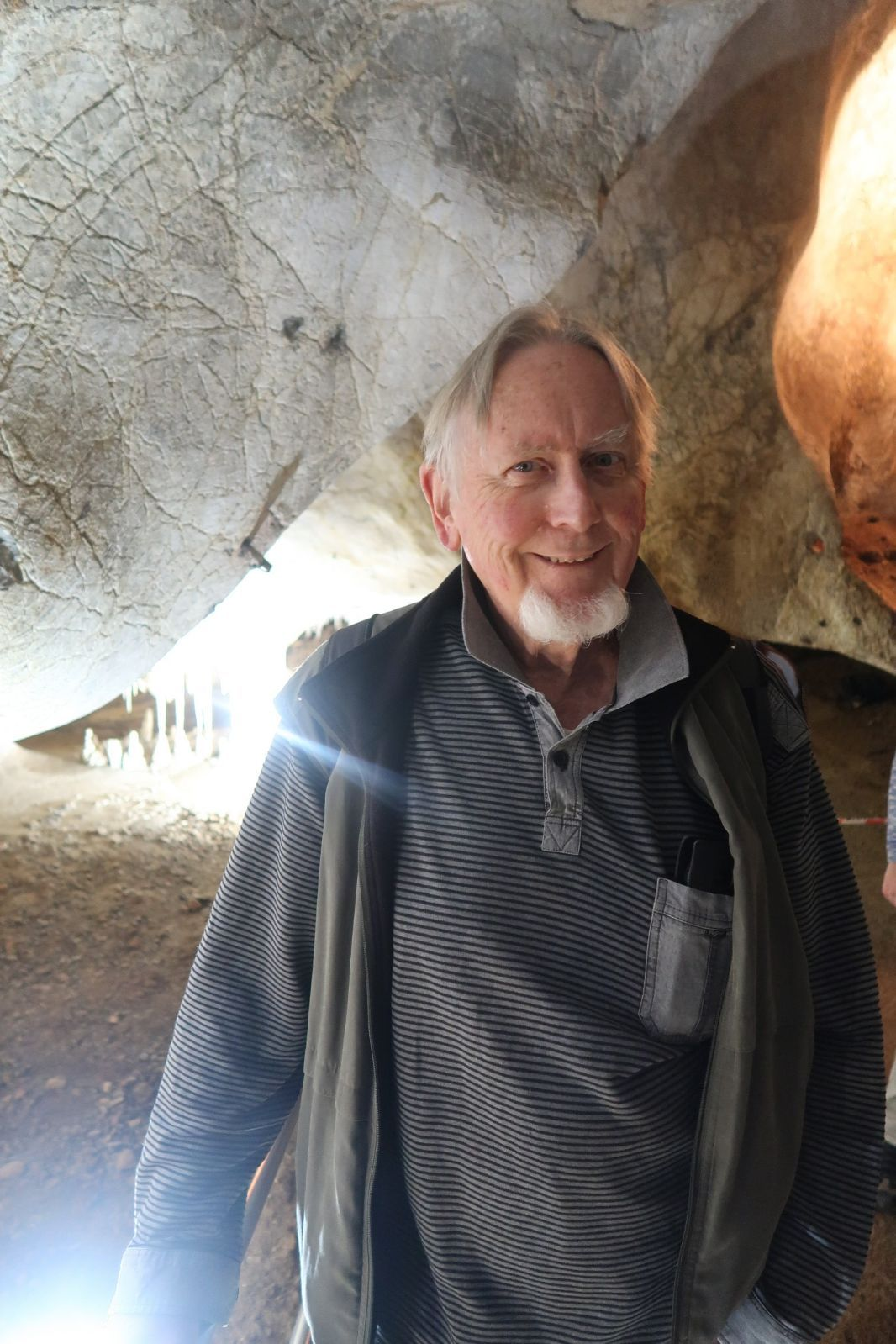
- Mike Gray at Jenolan Caves, NSW, 2018
- Born: 25 August 1941; Perth, Western Australia, Australia
- Died: 28 July 2023 (aged 81); Katoomba, New South Wales
- Education: Wesley College, Perth; University of Western Australia; Macquarie University
- Spouse: Greta Gray (nee Jensen)
- Children: Emma Gray, Anna Gray
- Scientific career
- Fields: Arachnology
- Workplaces: Australian Museum
- Thesis: A Systematic Study of the Funnel Web Spiders (Mygalomorphae: Hexathelidae Atracinae) (1986)
- Doctoral advisor: Dinah Hales, David Briscoe, Courtenay Smithers

Michael Robert Blair Gray (25 August 1941 – 28 July 2023) was an arachnologist who specialised in the taxonomy of spiders at the Australian Museum in Sydney with a particular interest in the systematics of Australian funnel-web spiders (Atracidae).

== Biography ==
Gray was born to Dorothy Dean Gray (nee Sweeting) and William Blair Christie Gray in Kensington, Western Australia. Gray was the great grandchild of William Blair Gray. He grew up in Perth, Western Australia, and attended Wesley College, Perth.

In 1968, Gray received a Master of Science with the Zoology Department of the University of Western Australia supervised by Barbara York Main. His thesis was titled: Comparison of Three Genera of Trapdoor Spiders (Ctenizidae, Aganippini) with Respect to Survival under Arid Conditions. In 1986, Gray was awarded a PhD through Macquarie University, with the thesis A Systematic Study of the Funnel Web Spiders (Mygalomorphae: Hexathelidae: Atracinae).

While at the Australian Museum, Gray met his wife, Greta Jensen, who was then working in the Marine Invertebrates department. They married in 1970 and had two children, Emma and Anna.

== Career ==
In 1968 Gray started as Assistant Curator of Arachnology at the Australian Museum. By 2003, Gray had progressed to the position of Principal Research Scientist.

Gray's research interests included the systematics of Australian funnel-web spiders (Atracidae). Of particular public interest along with Gray’s funnel-web work, was a collection of papers co-written with medical doctor Geoff Isbister relating to spider bites. This work debunked the myth of flesh eating necrosis being caused by a bite from an Australian white-tailed spider (Lampona spp.). In 2004, Isbister and Gray were nominated as finalists in the Australian Skeptics Eureka Prize for Critical Thinking, for their paper on the white-tailed spider bite.

Cave spiders were another research interest, with Gray undertaking fieldwork in Jenolan Caves, Wombeyan Caves and caves on the Nullarbor Plain. Notable surveys Gray was involved in include the World Heritage Rainforests Survey with the Queensland Museum, the Lord Howe Island Survey, and the North East Forests Biodiversity Survey with NSW National Parks and Wildlife Service.

Equally important to his research was public engagement. Throughout his career, Gray was regularly interviewed by media outlets. Through these interviews he tried to educate and build public interest in spiders. In 1997, Gray curated the Spiders! exhibition at the Australian Museum.

Scientific committees and societies Gray has been a member of include:

- Jenolan Caves Scientific Advisory Committee
- Australian Venoms Research Council
- Joyce Vickery Scientific Research Fund grants committee (Chair)
- Linnean Society of New South Wales

Gray was particularly active within the Linnean Society having been a member since 1981, then a council member in 1988 and President in 2012-2013.

Gray was an Honorary Associate in the Faculty of Science and the Faculty of Agriculture Food and Natural Resources at the University of Sydney. Gray supervised many students studying for Honours, Masters, and PhD degrees. He also became a mentor to retired pharmacist Graham Wishart, developing Wishart's interest in trapdoor spiders.

Gray retired in 2009 and in 2010, as a retired fellow of the Australian Museum, published his PhD thesis findings A revision of the Australian funnel-web spiders (Hexathelidae: Atracinae).

Gray's field work has resulted in almost 11,000 specimen lots registered in the Australian Museum database under his name. Gray introduced contemporary curatorial techniques and standards to registering arachnology specimens at the Australian Museum. In 1977, with the support of an assistant, he started databasing specimens. By 1990, 28,000 specimens had been recorded. As of 2023, over 131,000 arachnological specimens are represented in the Australian Museum database.

== See also ==
- Taxa named by Michael R.Gray
