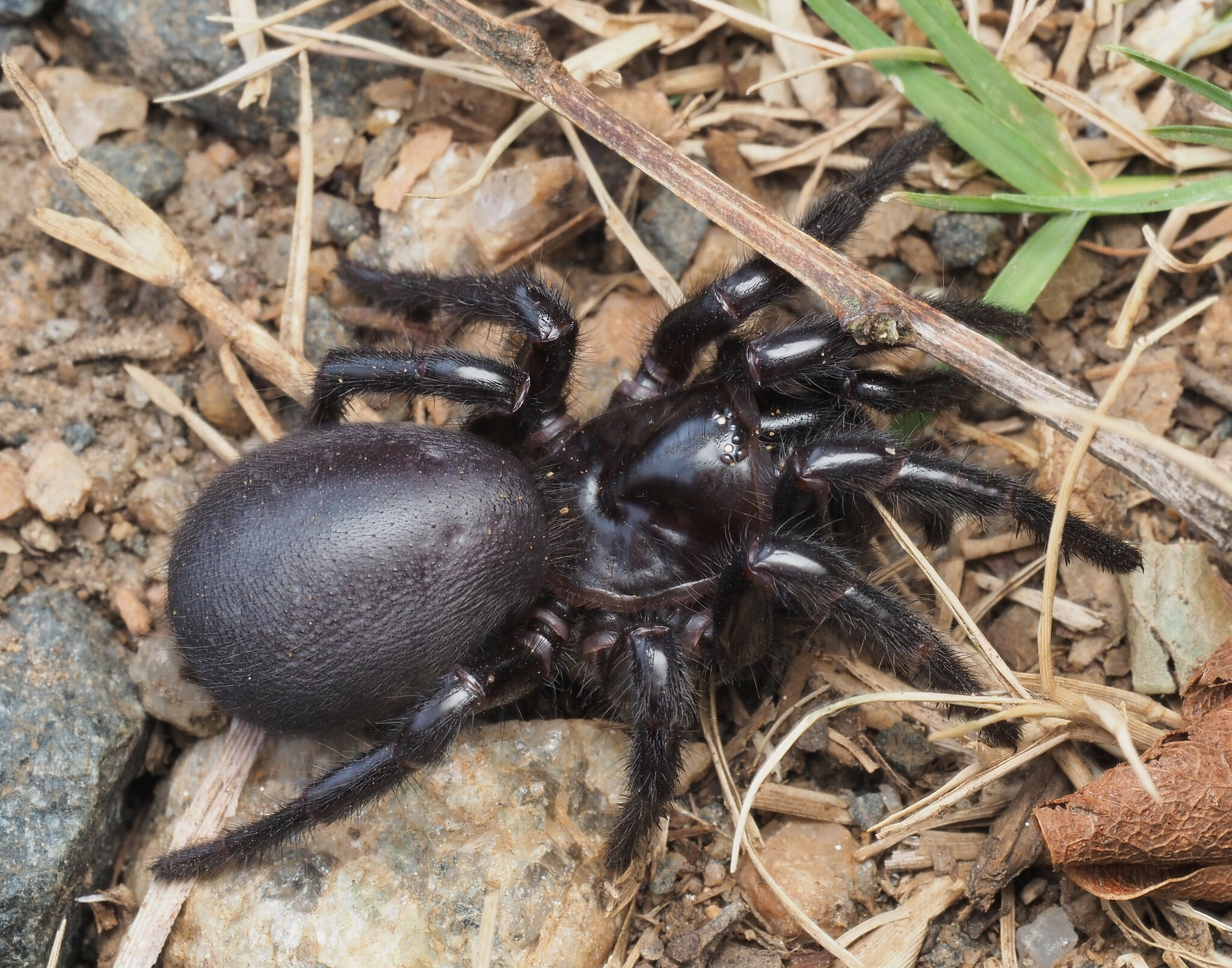
- Hadronyche infensa
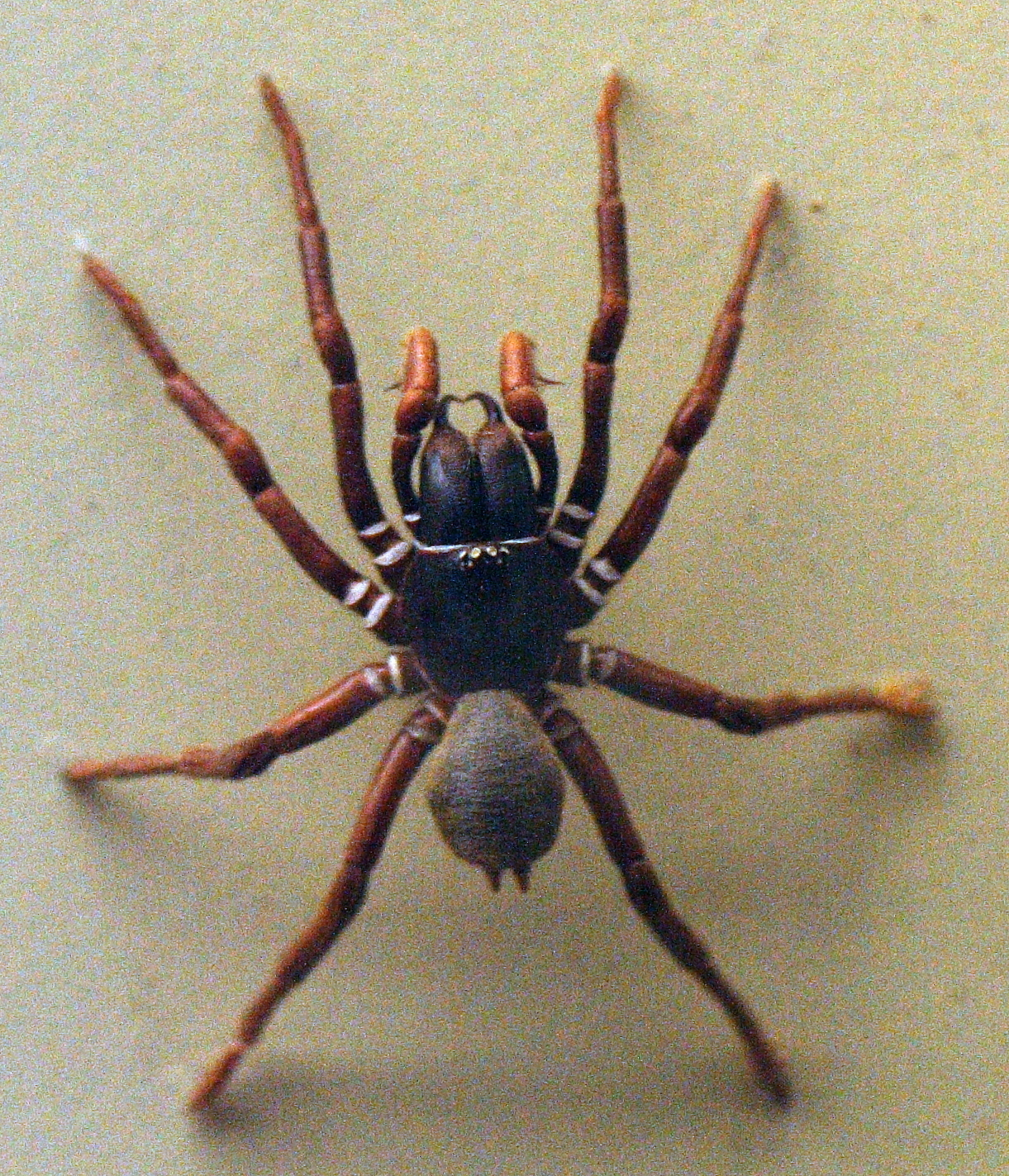
- Atrax sutherlandi

Scientific classification
- Kingdom: Animalia
- Phylum: Arthropoda
- Subphylum: Chelicerata
- Class: Arachnida
- Order: Araneae
- Infraorder: Mygalomorphae
- Clade: Avicularioidea
- Family: Atracidae; Hogg, 1901

Genera
- Atrax O. Pickard-Cambridge, 1877; Hadronyche L. Koch, 1873; Illawarra Gray, 2010

= Australian funnel-web spider =

Family of mygalomorph spiders

Atracidae is a family of mygalomorph spiders, commonly known as Australian funnel-web spiders or atracids. It has been included as a subfamily of the Hexathelidae, but is now recognised as a separate family. All members of the family are native to Australia. Atracidae consists of three genera: Atrax, Hadronyche, and Illawarra, comprising 35 species. Some members of the family produce venom that is dangerous to humans, and bites by spiders of six of the species have caused severe injuries to victims. The bites of the Sydney funnel-web spider (Atrax robustus) and northern tree-dwelling funnel-web spider (Hadronyche formidabilis) are potentially deadly, but no fatalities have occurred since the introduction of modern first-aid techniques and antivenom.

== Description ==
Spiders in the family Atracidae are medium to large in size, with body lengths ranging from 1 to 5 cm (0.39 to 1.97 in), with one exceptional specimen reaching 8 cm (3.1 in). They have a hairless carapace covering the front part of their bodies. Some atracids have relatively long spinnerets; this is especially true of the Sydney funnel-web spider (A. robustus). Males have a large mating spur projecting from the middle of their second pair of legs. Like other Mygalomorphae – an infraorder of spiders that includes the tropical tarantulas – these spiders have fangs that point straight down the body and do not point towards each other (cf. Araneomorphae). They have ample venom glands that lie entirely within their chelicerae. Their fangs are large and powerful, capable of penetrating fingernails and soft shoes.

Australian funnel-web spiders make their burrows in moist, cool, sheltered habitats – under rocks, in and under rotting logs, and some in rough-barked trees (occasionally meters above ground). They are commonly found in suburban rockeries and shrubberies, rarely in lawns or other open terrain. A burrow characteristically has irregular silk trip-lines radiating from the entrance. Unlike some related trapdoor spiders, they do not build lids to their burrows.

== Distribution ==
The primary range of the Australian funnel-web spiders is the eastern coast of Australia, with specimens found in New South Wales, South Australia, Victoria, Tasmania and Queensland. The only Australian states or territories without members of this family are Western Australia and the Northern Territory.

== Taxonomy ==
The first atracid spider to be described was Hadronyche cerberea, by Carl Ludwig Koch in 1873. Octavius Pickard-Cambridge described another atracid species, A. robustus, four years later. For a considerable time, confusion existed as to the limits of the genera Hadronyche and Atrax, not helped by the destruction of the type specimens of Hadronyche cerberea during World War II. In 1980, Robert J. Raven merged the two genera under Atrax. In 1988, Michael R. Gray separated them again, and in 2010, added a third genus, Illawarra.

The family placement of the group has varied. In 1892, Eugène Simon placed Atrax and Hadronyche in the family Dipluridae. In 1901, Henry R. Hogg considered them to be sufficiently distinctive to form a separate group, which he called "Atraceae" – the basis of the modern family name Atracidae. When in the 1980s, Raven elevated part of Simon's Dipluridae to the family Hexathelidae, he included the atracine group. Molecular phylogenetic studies consistently threw doubt on the monophyly of the Hexathelidae. In 2018, the group was restored to a full family as Atracidae. The following cladogram shows the relationship found between Atracidae and related taxa. Its sister taxon is Actinopodidae.

- - Dipluridae
  - - Hexathelidae
    - - Porrhothelidae
      - - Macrothelidae
        - - - Calisoga (Nemesiidae)
            - Hebestatis (Halonoproctidae)
          - - Atracidae
            - Actinopodidae

== Genera ==
As of October 2025, this family includes three genera:

- Atrax O. Pickard-Cambridge, 1877 – Australia
- Hadronyche L. Koch, 1873 – Australia
- Illawarra Gray, 2010 – Australia

== Medical significance ==
Australian funnel-web spiders are one of the most medically significant groups of spiders in the world and are regarded by some to be the most deadly, both in terms of clinical cases and venom toxicity. Six species have caused severe injuries to human victims: the Sydney funnel-web spider (Atrax robustus), the northern tree-dwelling funnel-web spider (Hadronyche formidabilis), the southern tree-dwelling funnel-web spider (H. cerberea), the Blue Mountains funnel-web spider (H. versuta), the Darling Downs funnel-web spider (H. infensa), and the Port Macquarie funnel-web spider (H. macquariensis).

Examination of bite records has implicated wandering males in most, if not all, fatal Australian funnel-web spider bites to humans. Adult males, recognised by the modified terminal segment of the palp, tend to wander during the warmer months of the year, looking for receptive females for mating. They are attracted to water, hence are often found in swimming pools, into which they often fall while wandering. The spiders can survive immersion in water for several hours and can deliver a bite when removed from the water. They also show up in garages and yards in suburban Sydney. Contrary to a commonly held belief, Australian funnel-web spiders are not able to jump, although they can run quickly.

The volume of venom delivered to large animals is often small, possibly due to the angle of the fangs, which are not horizontally opposed, and because contact is often brief before the spider is brushed off. About 10 to 25% of bites are claimed to produce significant toxicity, but the likelihood cannot be predicted and all bites should be treated as potentially life-threatening.

Bites from Sydney funnel-web spider complex have caused 13 documented deaths (seven in children). In all cases where the sex of the biting spider could be determined, it was found to be the male of the species. One member of the genus Hadronyche, the northern tree-dwelling funnel-web spider, has also been claimed to cause fatal envenomation, but to date, this lacks the support of a specific medical report. Assays of venom from several Hadronyche species have shown it to be similar to Atrax venom.

In 2021 researchers from the University of Queensland announced that the venom from funnel-web spiders found on Fraser Island contains the molecule Hi1a that could block the cell death message after a heart attack, protecting the heart after major injury and potentially preventing or minimising muscle damage.

=== Toxins ===
Many different toxins are found in the venom of Atrax and Hadronyche spiders. Collectively, these spider toxins are given the name atracotoxins (ACTX), as all these spiders belong to the family Atracidae. The first toxins isolated were the δ-ACTX toxins present in the venom of both A. robustus (δ-ACTX-Ar1, formerly known as robustoxin or atracotoxin) and H. versuta (δ-ACTX-Hv1a, formerly known as versutoxin). Both of these toxins produce the same effects in monkeys as those seen in humans, suggesting that they are responsible for the physiological effects seen with crude venom.

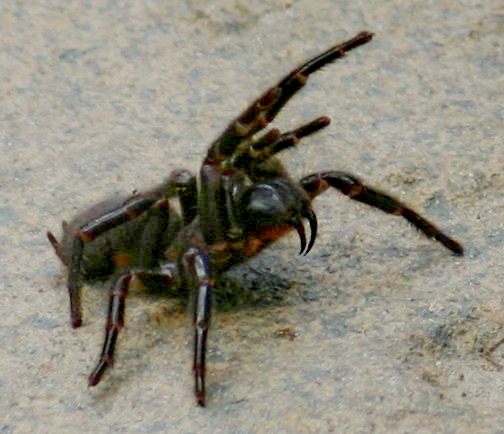
Female Sydney funnel-web spider (A. robustus) in a warning posture

These toxins are thought to induce spontaneous, repetitive firing and prolongation of action potentials, resulting in continuous acetylcholine neurotransmitter release from somatic and autonomic presynaptic nerve endings. This leads to slower voltage-gated sodium channel inactivation and a hyperpolarizing shift in the voltage-dependence of activation. This in turn inhibits neurally mediated transmitter release, resulting in a surge of endogenous acetylcholine, noradrenaline, and adrenaline.

Although extremely toxic to primates, the venom appears to be fairly harmless to many other animals. These animals may be resistant to the venom's effects due to the presence of IgG, and possibly cross-linked IgG and IgM inactivating factors in their blood plasma that bind to the toxins responsible and neutralise them.

The female's venom was thought to be only about a sixth as potent to humans as that of the male's. The bite of a female or juvenile may still be serious, but considerable variability occurs in venom toxicity between species, together with assumed degrees of inefficiency in the method of venom delivery.

=== Symptoms ===
Envenomation symptoms observed following bites by these spiders are very similar. The bite is initially very painful, due to the size of the fangs penetrating the skin. Puncture marks and local bleeding are also usually visible. If substantial envenomation occurs, symptoms generally occur within minutes and progress rapidly.

Early symptoms of systemic envenomation include goose bumps, sweating, tingling around the mouth and tongue, twitching (initially facial and intercostal), salivation, watery eyes, elevated heart rate, and elevated blood pressure. As systemic envenomation progresses, symptoms include nausea, vomiting, shortness of breath (caused by airway obstruction), agitation, confusion, writhing, grimacing, muscle spasms, pulmonary oedema (of neurogenic or hypertensive origin), metabolic acidosis, and extreme hypertension. The final stages of severe envenomation include dilation of the pupils (often fixed), uncontrolled generalised muscle twitching, unconsciousness, elevated intracranial pressure, and death. Death generally is a result of progressive hypotension or possibly elevated intracranial pressure consequent on cerebral oedema.

The onset of severe envenomation can be rapid. In one prospective study, the median time to onset of envenomation was 28 minutes, with only two cases having onset after two hours (both had pressure immobilisation bandages applied). Death may occur within a period ranging from 15 minutes (this occurred when a small child was bitten) to three days.

=== Treatment ===
Owing to the severity of symptoms, and the speed with which they progress, in areas where these spiders are known to live, all bites from large, black spiders should be treated as though they were caused by Australian funnel-web spiders. First-aid treatment for a suspected Australian funnel-web spider bite consists of immediately applying a pressure immobilization bandage; a technique which consists of wrapping the bitten limb with a crepe bandage, as well as applying a splint to limit movement of the limb. This technique was originally developed for snakebites, but has also been shown to be effective at slowing venom movement and preventing systemic envenomation in case of an Australian funnel-web spider bite. Some evidence suggests that periods of prolonged localisation may slowly inactivate the venom.

Further supportive care may be necessary, but the mainstay of treatment is antivenom. Venom from the male Sydney funnel-web spider (A. robustus) is used in producing the antivenom, but it appears to be effective against the venom of all species of atracids. Australian funnel-web spider antivenom has also been shown, in vitro, to reverse the effects of eastern mouse spider (Missulena bradleyi) venom.

Before the introduction of antivenom, envenomation resulted in significant morbidity and mortality. The purified rabbit IgG antivenom was developed in 1981 through a team effort led by Dr. Struan Sutherland, head of immunology at the Australian Commonwealth Serum Laboratories in Melbourne. The antivenom is fast-acting and highly and globally effective. Antivenom therapy has shortened the course of envenomation effects; prior to its availability, the average length of hospital treatment for severe bites was about 14 days. Today, antivenom-treated patients are commonly discharged from hospital within one to three days. No deaths are known since it became available.
