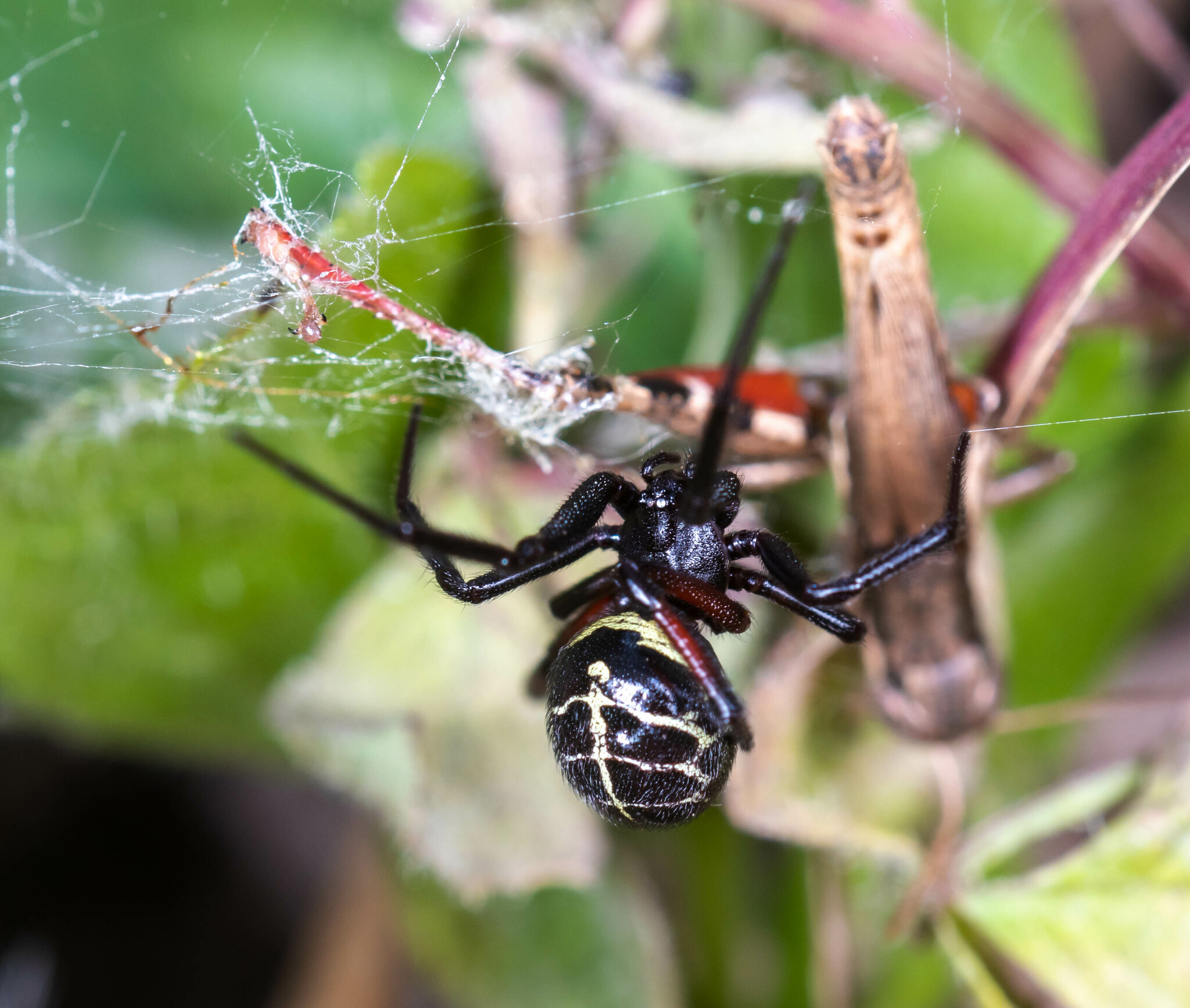
- female from Thailand

Scientific classification
- Kingdom: Animalia
- Phylum: Arthropoda
- Subphylum: Chelicerata
- Class: Arachnida
- Order: Araneae
- Infraorder: Araneomorphae
- Family: Theridiidae
- Genus: Steatoda
- Species: S. tortoisea

Binomial name
- Steatoda tortoisea Yin, Griswold, Bao & Xu, 2003

= Steatoda tortoisea =

Species of spider

Steatoda tortoisea is a species of spider in the family Theridiidae. It is endemic to China, where it has been recorded from Yunnan Province. Only the female has been described; the male remains unknown.

== Taxonomy ==
The species was first described in 2003 by Yin, Griswold, Bao and Xu based on female specimens collected from the Nujiang region of Yunnan Province. The specific name "tortoisea" is derived from the tortoise shell-like pattern found on the spider's abdominal dorsum.

== Distribution ==
S. tortoisea has been described from Yunnan Province in southwestern China, specifically from the Nujiang region and Liuku in Lushui County. It has also been found in Thailand.

== Description ==
The female of S. tortoisea has a pear-shaped carapace that is red-brown to black-brown in color. The abdominal dorsum is ovoid and black-brown with a distinctive tortoise shell-like pattern and three pairs of muscle impressions, with the second pair being the largest.

The epigyne is characterized by the presence of a scape with lateral margins that turn up towards the median. The vulva contains two large spherical spermathecae. The species is most similar to Steatoda cingulata, but can be distinguished by the presence of the characteristic scape and the distinct abdominal patterns.

The holotype female measures 9.27 mm in total length, with a carapace length of 3.97 mm and width of 3.76 mm. The abdomen measures 5.51 mm in length and 4.55 mm in width.
