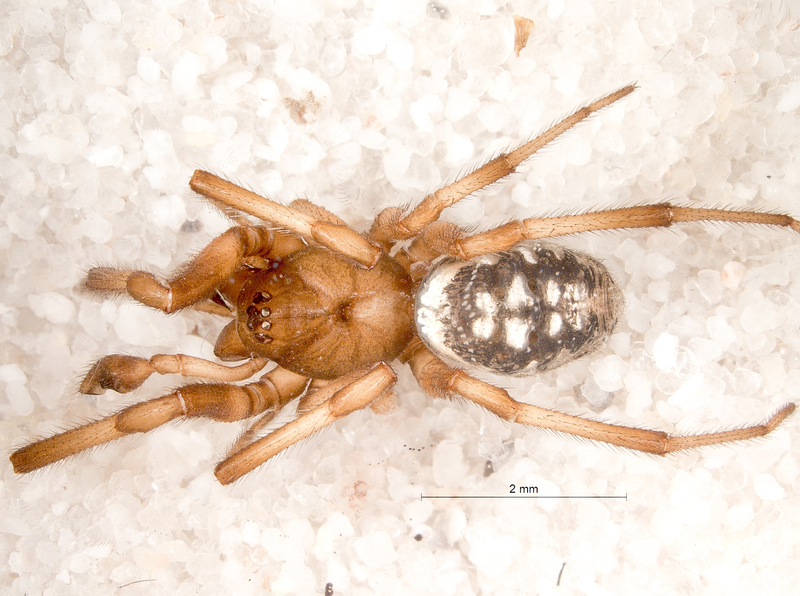
- S. albomaculata, adult male
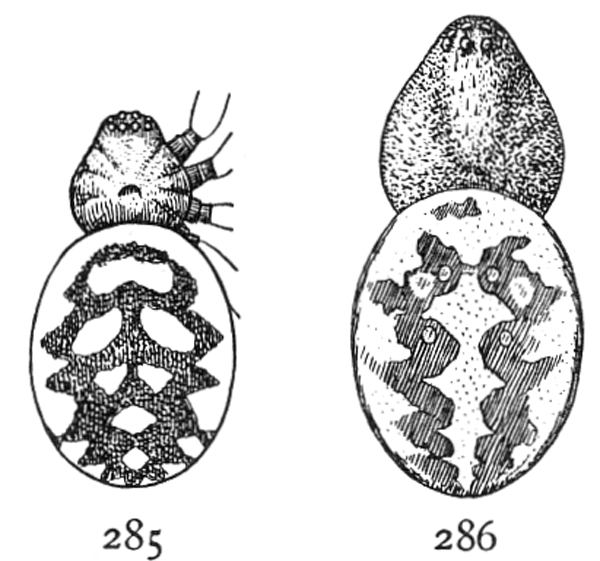
- drawing of S. albomaculata, female on left compared to S. triangulosa on right

Scientific classification
- Kingdom: Animalia
- Phylum: Arthropoda
- Subphylum: Chelicerata
- Class: Arachnida
- Order: Araneae
- Infraorder: Araneomorphae
- Family: Theridiidae
- Genus: Steatoda
- Species: S. albomaculata

Binomial name
- Steatoda albomaculata (De Geer, 1778)

= Steatoda albomaculata =

Species of spider

Steatoda albomaculata or white-spotted false widow spider is a species of cobweb spider in the family Theridiidae. It is found in North America, Europe and Russia, North Africa, Israel, Kazakhstan, Iran, Central Asia, China, Korea, and Japan.

== Subspecies ==
Steatoda albomaculata used to have 2 subspecies: Steatoda albomaculata infuscata and it's nominotypical subspecies Steatoda albomaculata albomaculata. In 2024 S. a. infuscata was synonymized with Steatoda albomaculata. Currently, it has no subspecies.
