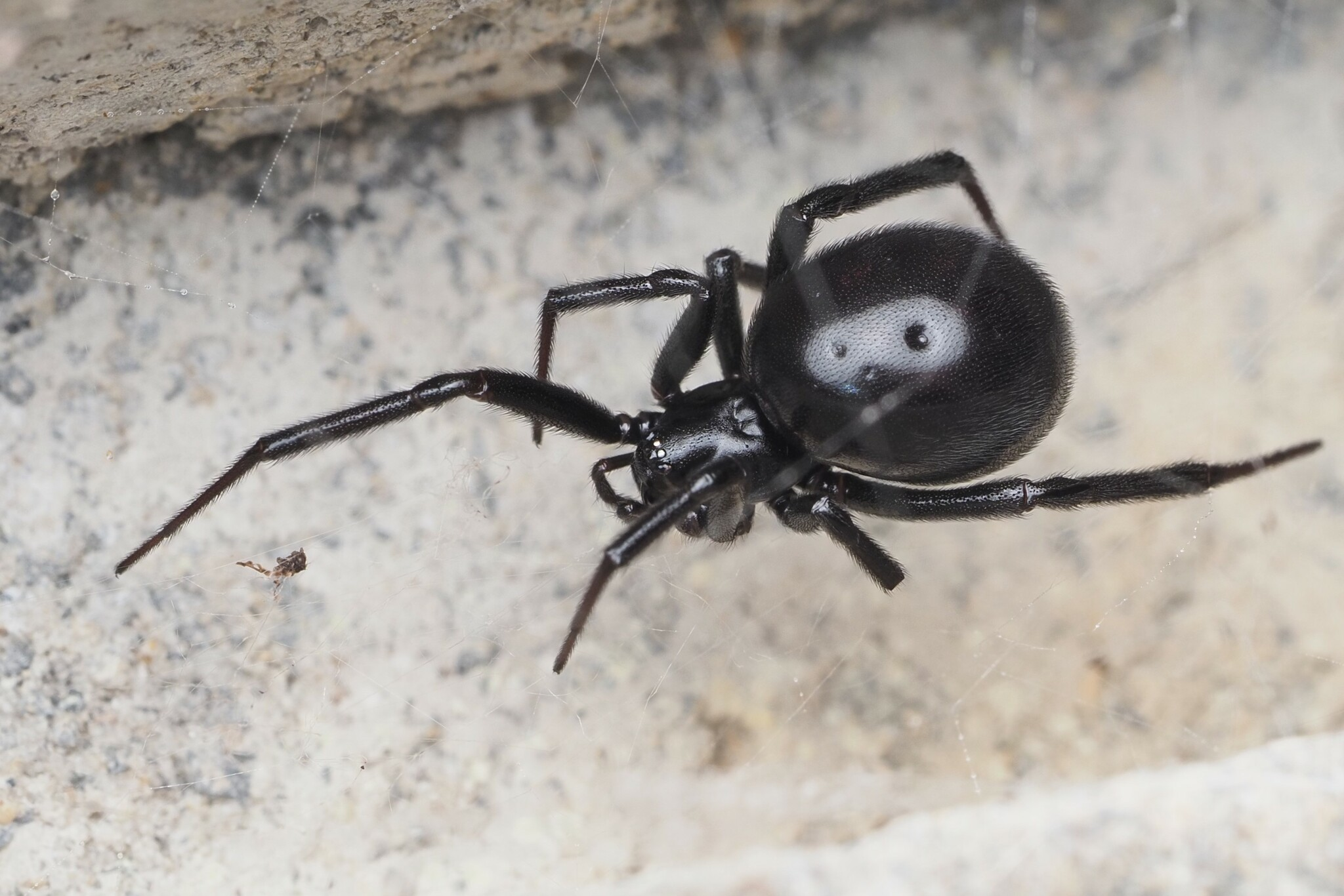
- Female
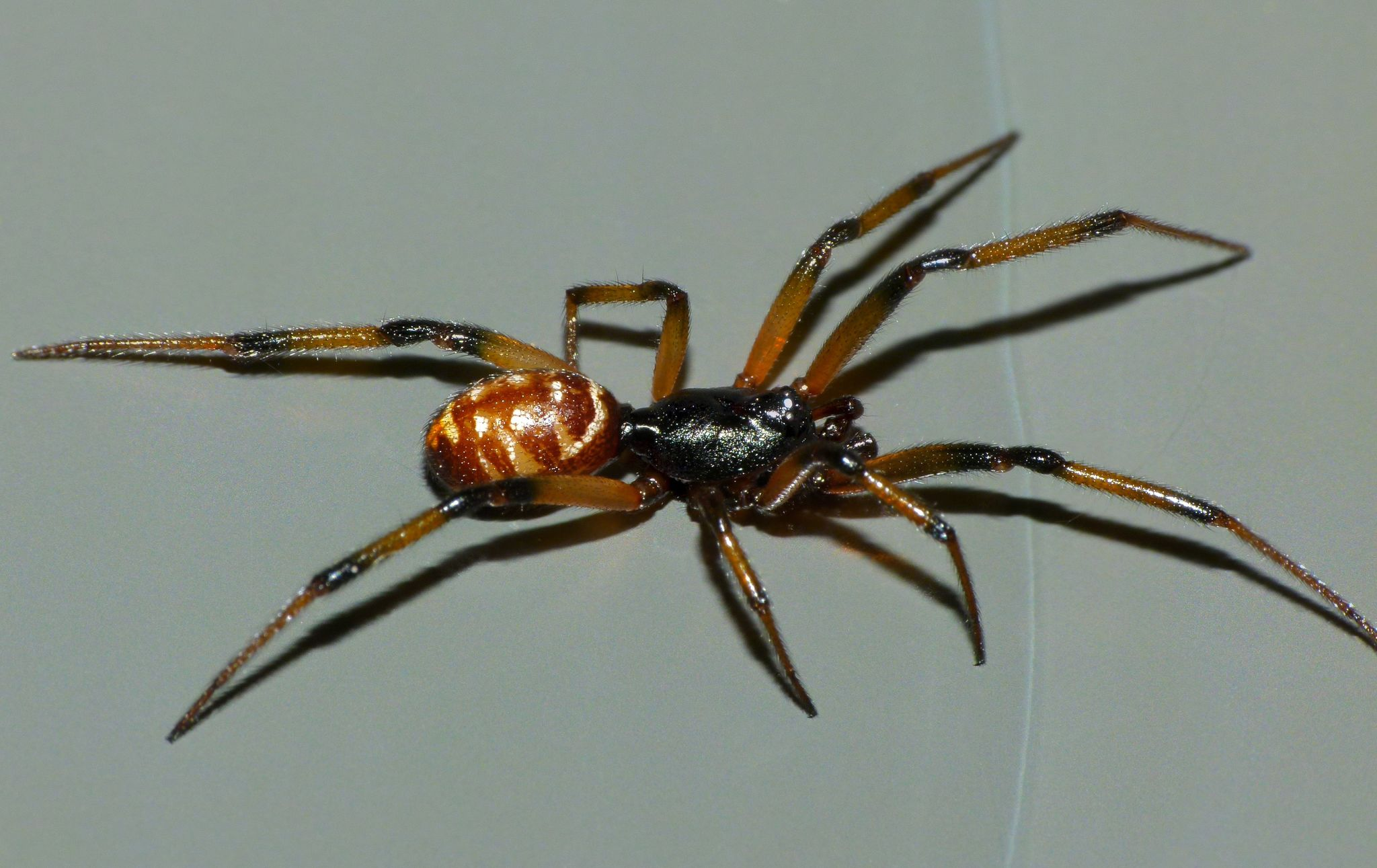
- Male

Scientific classification
- Kingdom: Animalia
- Phylum: Arthropoda
- Subphylum: Chelicerata
- Class: Arachnida
- Order: Araneae
- Infraorder: Araneomorphae
- Family: Theridiidae
- Genus: Steatoda
- Species: S. capensis

Binomial name
- Steatoda capensis Hann, 1990

Synonyms
- Teutana lepida O. Pickard-Cambridge, 1904; Steatoda lepida Benoit, 1977

= Steatoda capensis =

Species of spider

Steatoda capensis is a spider originating from South Africa. Its common names include the black cobweb spider, brown house spider, cupboard spider and due to its similarities to the katipō spider it is commonly known as the false katipō in New Zealand.

Common throughout Southern Africa, it has been introduced into other countries and is now present in Australia and throughout New Zealand.

== Description ==
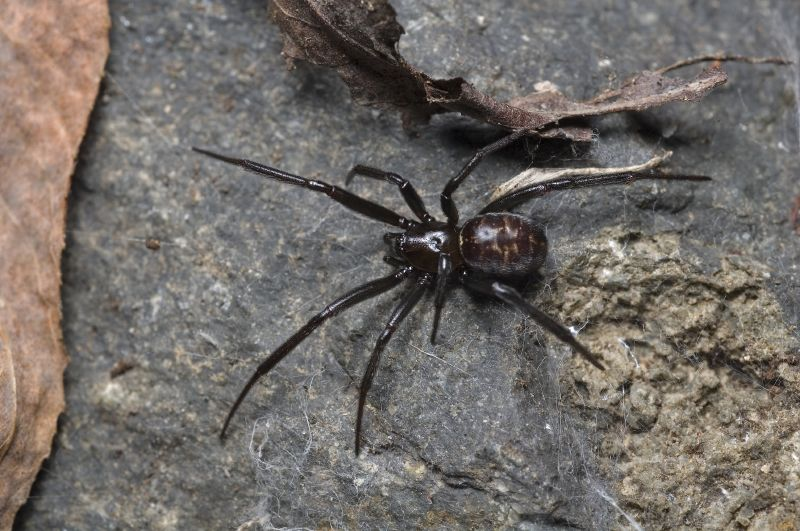
female

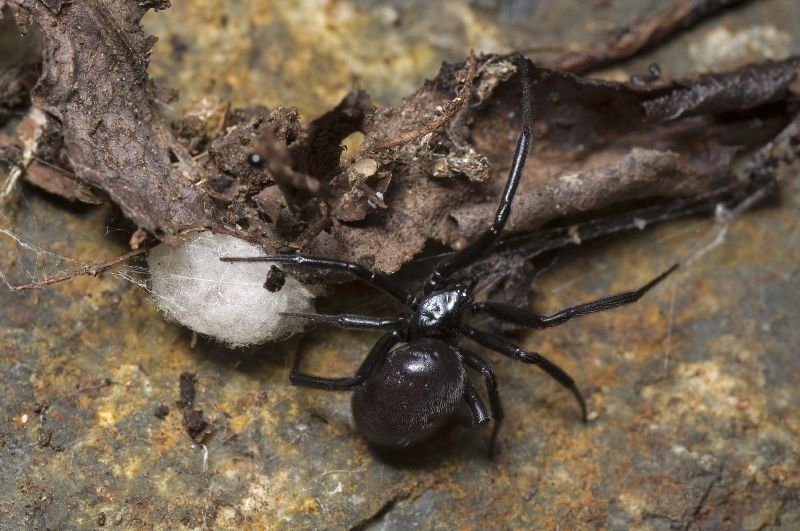
female with egg sac

Steatoda capensis is a small spider, usually an all-over shiny black. It may have a small bright red, orange, or yellow patch near the tip of the abdomen along with a crescent shaped band near the front of the abdomen.

== Distribution and habitat ==
Steatoda capensis is native to South Africa but is also found in Australia and New Zealand (where it is especially widespread in the latter). The spiders are synanthropic and frequently live on or in buildings. They also occur in a variety of other habitats such as sand dunes.

== Ecology ==
In New Zealand, Steatoda capensis occurs in sand dunes where the endemic katipō spider also occurs. The two spiders occupy similar niches to one another, but S. capensis can reproduce more quickly. Because of this, it is possible that S. capensis is slowly displacing katipō spiders from their native habitat, which may be a contributing factor in their declining population.

== Etymology ==
The species name of "capensis" refers to Cape Town, which is where the spider originates.

== Taxonomy ==
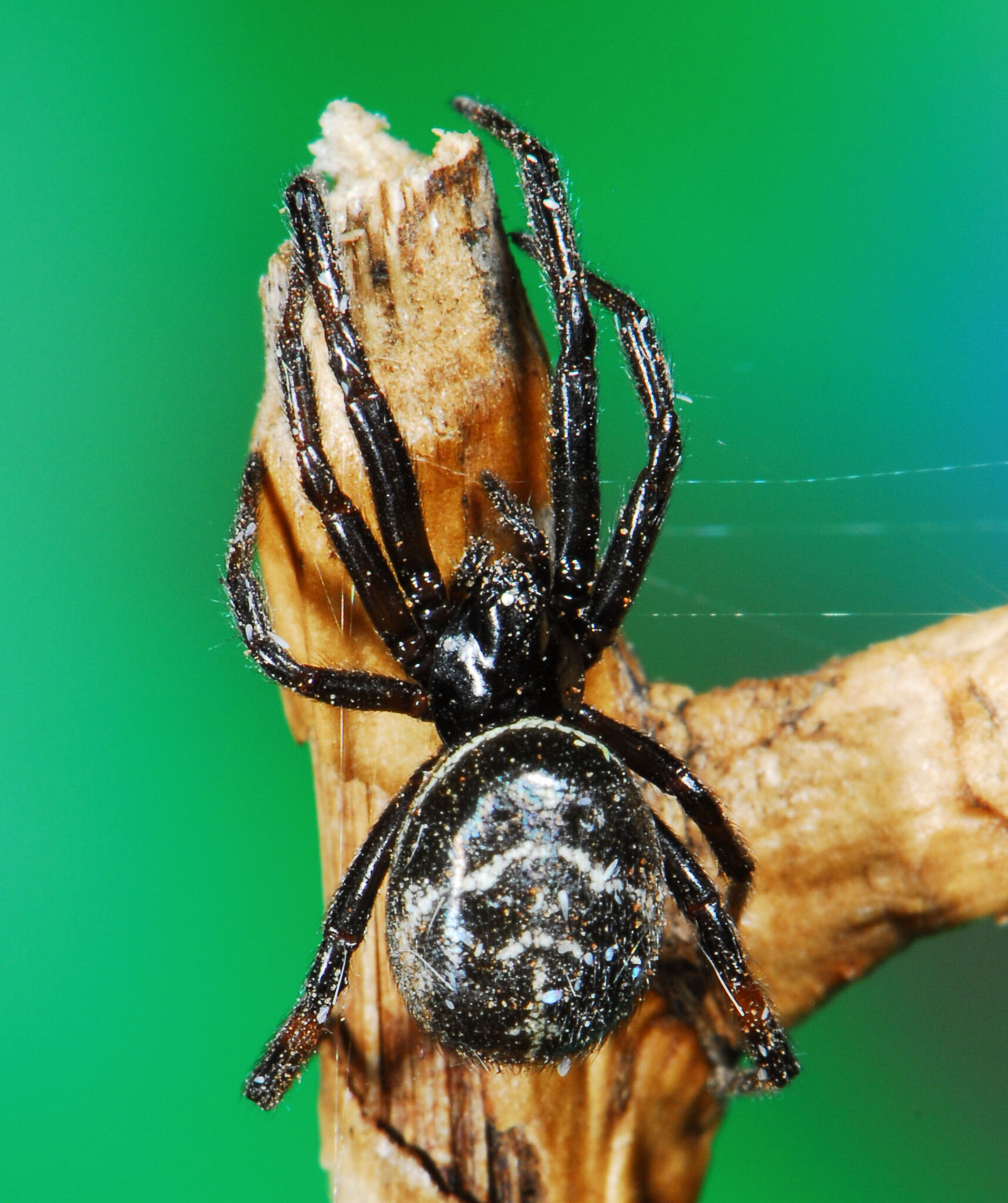
female

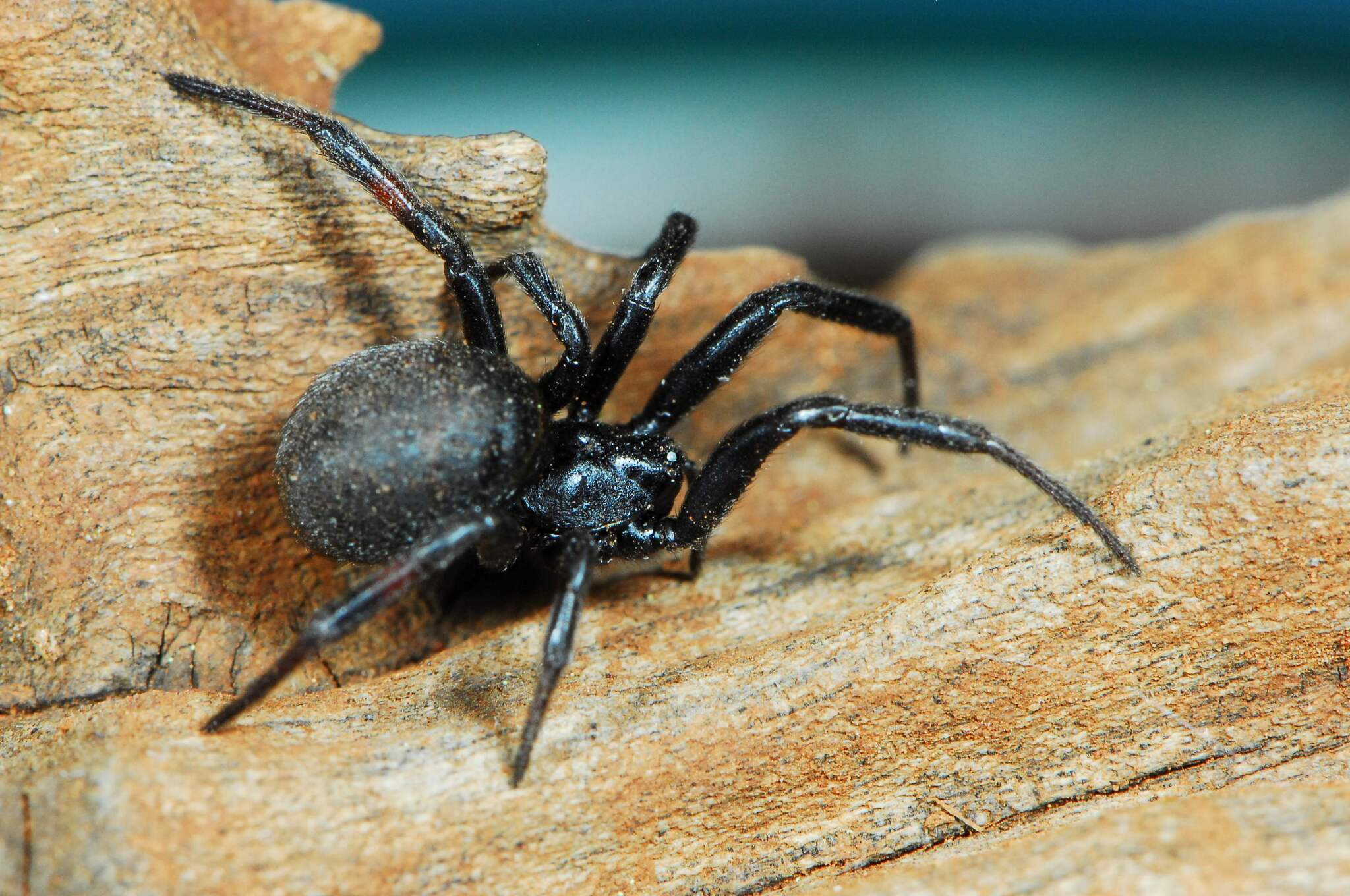
female

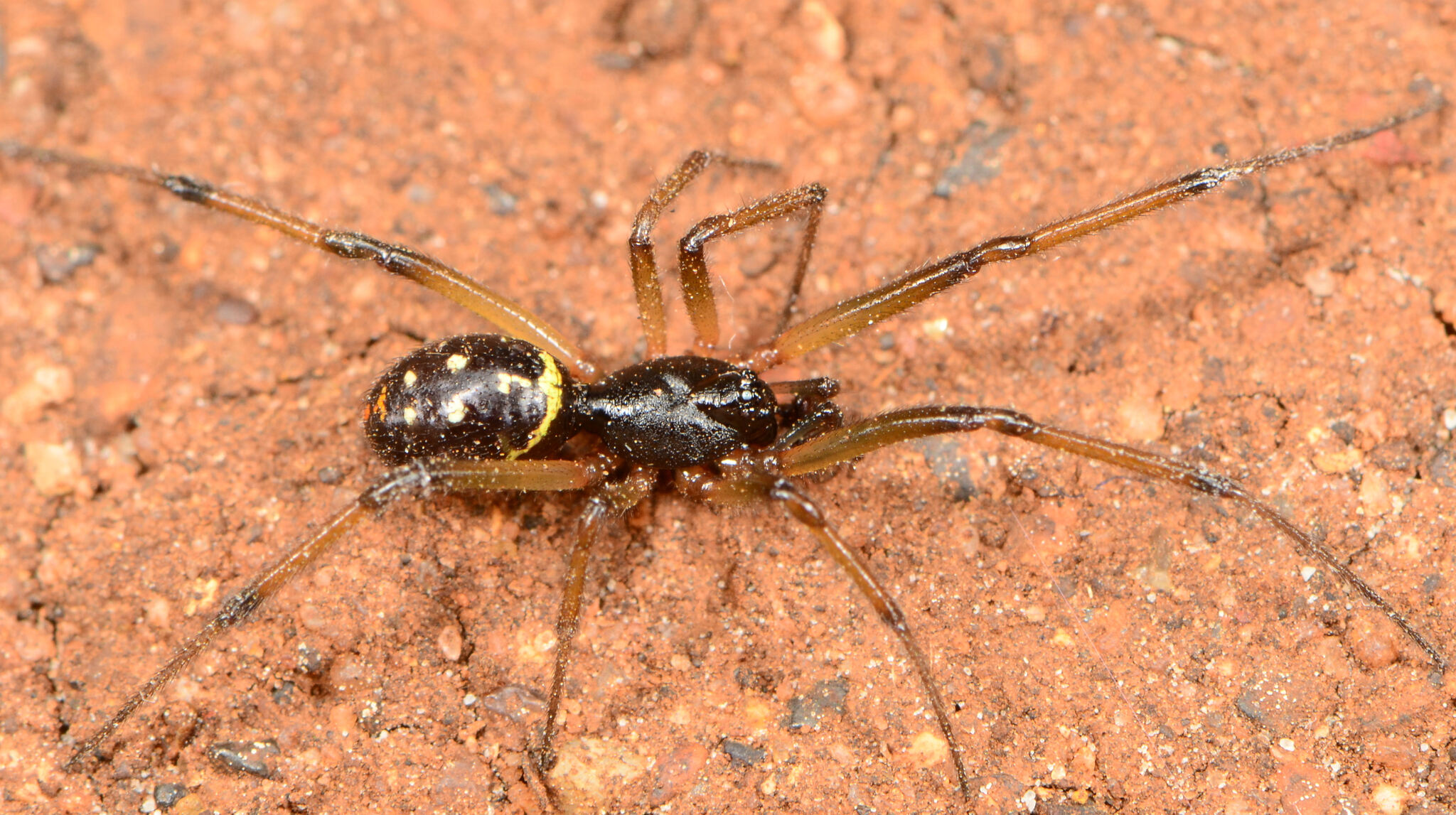
male

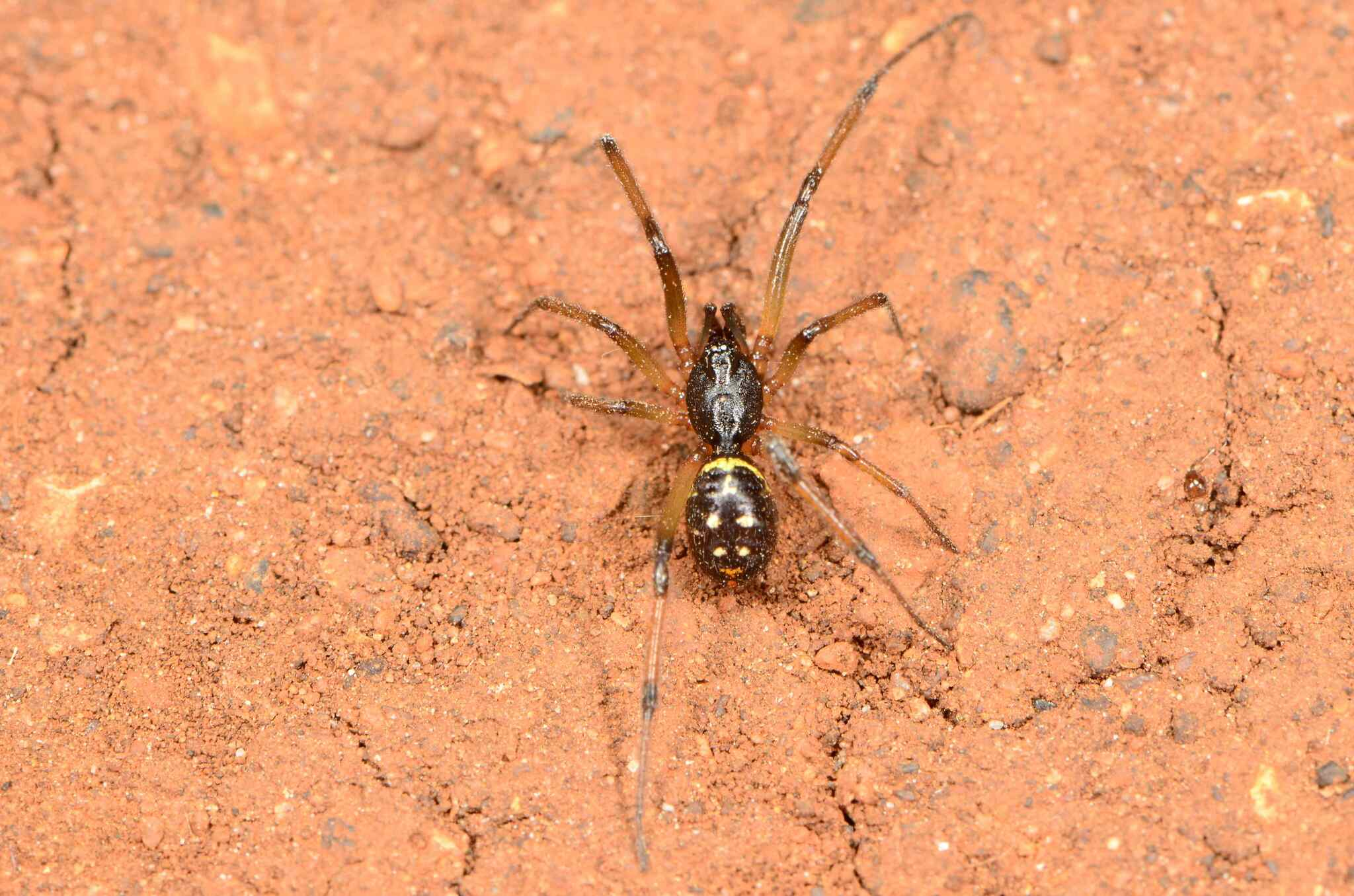
male

Steatoda capensis was first described in 1904 as Teutana lepida by Octavius Pickard-Cambridge from specimens collected in South Africa. In 1977, T. lepida was moved to the Steatoda genus since Teutana had previously been recognized as a synonym of Steatoda. However, in 1990, it was recognized that there was separate species of spider named Steatoda lepida, so the species that was formerly T. lepida was renamed as Steatoda capensis.

== Interactions with humans ==
Although not severe, S. capensis produce a painful bite when threatened. Bites are predominately inflicted by females, but males also have the potential to bite. Bites from S. capensis can cause steatodism, which can be thought of as a less severe form of latrodectism. Effects of the bite typically include localized pain and redness around the bite, but may also include nausea and headaches. Antivenom typically used for Latrodectus hasselti bites may also be effective on S. capensis bites.

== Conservation ==
Steatoda capensis is listed as Least Concern due to its wide geographical range. The species is well protected in reserves and parks.
