= Steatoda lawrencei =

Lawrence False Button Spider

Scientific classification
- Kingdom: Animalia
- Phylum: Arthropoda
- Subphylum: Chelicerata
- Class: Arachnida
- Order: Araneae
- Infraorder: Araneomorphae
- Family: Theridiidae
- Genus: Steatoda
- Species: S. lawrencei

Binomial name
- Steatoda lawrencei Brignoli, 1983

Synonyms
- Teutana albovittata Lawrence, 1947

Species of spider

Steatoda lawrencei is a species of spider in the family Theridiidae. It is endemic to KwaZulu-Natal in South Africa and commonly known as the Lawrence false button spider.

== Distribution ==
Steatoda lawrencei is known only from the South African province KwaZulu-Natal at altitudes ranging from 47 to 232 m. Locations include Ndumo Game Reserve, Tembe Elephant Park, and Umfolozi Nature Reserve at Umfolosi Drift.

== Habitat and ecology ==
Steatoda lawrencei constructs three-dimensional webs in dark places, usually close to the substrate. The species is frequently found under stones. It has been sampled from the Savanna biome.

== Conservation ==
Steatoda lawrencei is listed as Data Deficient for taxonomic reasons. The status of the species remains uncertain. Additional sampling is needed to collect males and to determine the species' range. The species is protected in Ndumo Game Reserve and Tembe Elephant Park.

== Etymology ==
The species is named in honor of Reginald Frederick Lawrence, a South African arachnologist who made significant contributions to the study of southern African spiders.

== Taxonomy ==
Steatoda lawrencei was originally described by Lawrence in 1947 as Teutana albovittata from Umfolosi Drift. As Teutana was preoccupied, Brignoli in 1983 provided the replacement name Steatoda lawrencei. The species has not been revised and is known only from the female.
