= Steatoda palomara =

Scientific classification
- Kingdom: Animalia
- Phylum: Arthropoda
- Subphylum: Chelicerata
- Class: Arachnida
- Order: Araneae
- Infraorder: Araneomorphae
- Family: Theridiidae
- Genus: Steatoda
- Species: S. palomara

Binomial name
- Steatoda palomara Chamberlin & Ivie, 1935

Species of spider

Steatoda palomara is a species of cobweb spider in the family Theridiidae. It is found in the United States.
