= Steatoda quinquenotata =

Scientific classification
- Domain: Eukaryota
- Kingdom: Animalia
- Phylum: Arthropoda
- Subphylum: Chelicerata
- Class: Arachnida
- Order: Araneae
- Infraorder: Araneomorphae
- Family: Theridiidae
- Genus: Steatoda
- Species: S. quinquenotata

Binomial name
- Steatoda quinquenotata Blackwall, 1865

Synonyms
- Theridion quinquenotatum (Blackwall, 1865)

Species of spider

Steatoda quinquenotata is a species of spiders of the family Theridiidae that is endemic in Cape Verde. It was first described as Theridion quinquenotatum by John Blackwall in 1865.
