= Steatoda grandis =

Scientific classification
- Domain: Eukaryota
- Kingdom: Animalia
- Phylum: Arthropoda
- Subphylum: Chelicerata
- Class: Arachnida
- Order: Araneae
- Infraorder: Araneomorphae
- Family: Theridiidae
- Genus: Steatoda
- Species: S. grandis

Binomial name
- Steatoda grandis Banks, 1901

Species of arachnid

Steatoda grandis is a species of cobweb spider in the family Theridiidae. It is found in the United States.
