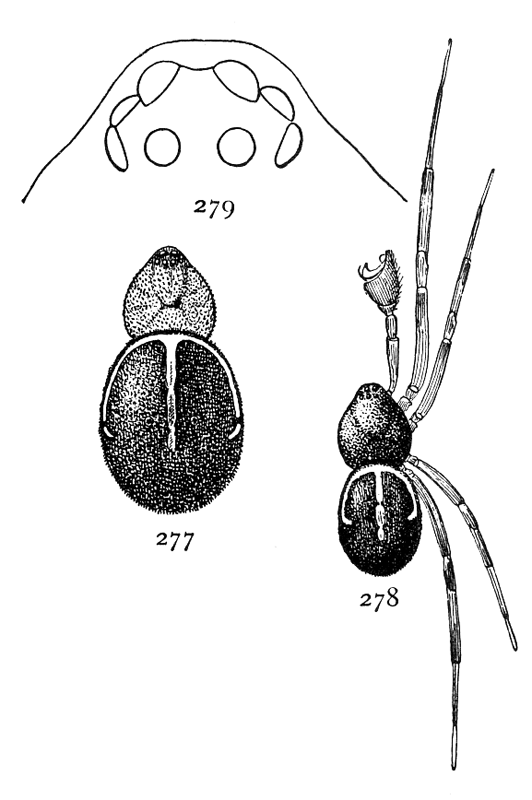
- Steatoda borealis.—277, female. 278, male. Both enlarged four times. 279, eyes

Scientific classification
- Domain: Eukaryota
- Kingdom: Animalia
- Phylum: Arthropoda
- Subphylum: Chelicerata
- Class: Arachnida
- Order: Araneae
- Infraorder: Araneomorphae
- Family: Theridiidae
- Genus: Steatoda
- Species: S. borealis

Binomial name
- Steatoda borealis (Hentz, 1850)

= Steatoda borealis =

Species of spider

Steatoda borealis is a species of cobweb spider in the family Theridiidae. It is found in the United States and Canada.
