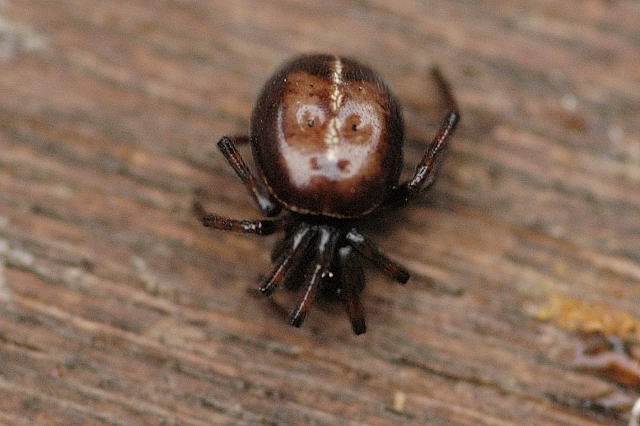
- Adult female

Scientific classification
- Kingdom: Animalia
- Phylum: Arthropoda
- Subphylum: Chelicerata
- Class: Arachnida
- Order: Araneae
- Infraorder: Araneomorphae
- Family: Theridiidae
- Genus: Steatoda
- Species: S. bipunctata

Binomial name
- Steatoda bipunctata (Linnaeus, 1758)

= Steatoda bipunctata =

Species of spider

Steatoda bipunctata is a species of cob-web spider, of the genus Steatoda, in the family Theridiidae.

With a holarctic distribution, it is common in North America and Europe. It may be found in proximity to human structures, such as basements or sheds. A nickname for this arachnid is the rabbit hutch spider, since rabbit hutches often make a suitable habitat. Steatoda bipunctata is similar in shape to the black widow spiders in the genus Latrodectus and can thus be mistaken for them, although its bite is significantly less dangerous to humans. For this reason, species of the genus Steatoda are commonly called 'false widows'.

The abdomens of both sexes are bulbous and brownish in coloration, typically with a broken pale line down the center and another pale line across the anterior portion of the abdomen. The apodemes (places of muscle attachment) on the dorsal side of the abdomen look like pairs of dark dimples and presumably give the spider its Latin name bi- (two) and -punctata (spots). The underside of the abdomen of the Rabbit Hutch Spider reveals a most interesting pattern resembling the infinity sign. The female abdomen is light brown and often shiny compared to the males.

Steatoda bipunctata rarely exceeds 7 mm in body length and there are no known instances of envenomation. It is highly unlikely the fangs of this small species can penetrate human skin.
