= Steatoda punctulata =

Scientific classification
- Domain: Eukaryota
- Kingdom: Animalia
- Phylum: Arthropoda
- Subphylum: Chelicerata
- Class: Arachnida
- Order: Araneae
- Infraorder: Araneomorphae
- Family: Theridiidae
- Genus: Steatoda
- Species: S. punctulata

Binomial name
- Steatoda punctulata (Marx, 1898)

Species of spider

Steatoda punctulata is a species of cobweb spider in the family Theridiidae. It is found in the United States and Mexico.
