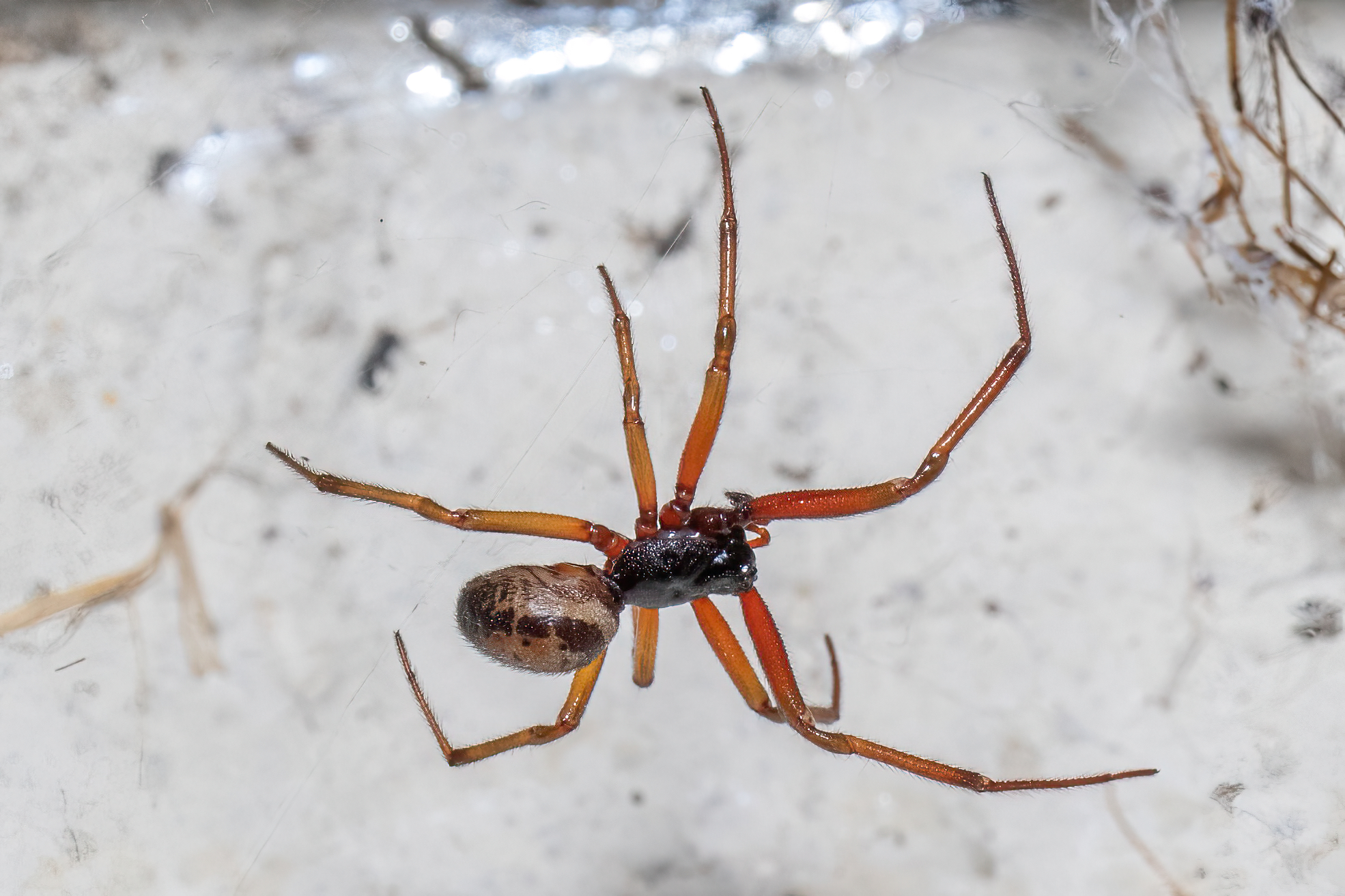

Conservation status
- Data Deficient (IUCN 3.1)

Scientific classification
- Kingdom: Animalia
- Phylum: Arthropoda
- Subphylum: Chelicerata
- Class: Arachnida
- Order: Araneae
- Infraorder: Araneomorphae
- Family: Theridiidae
- Genus: Steatoda
- Species: S. nobilis

Binomial name
- Steatoda nobilis (Thorell, 1875)
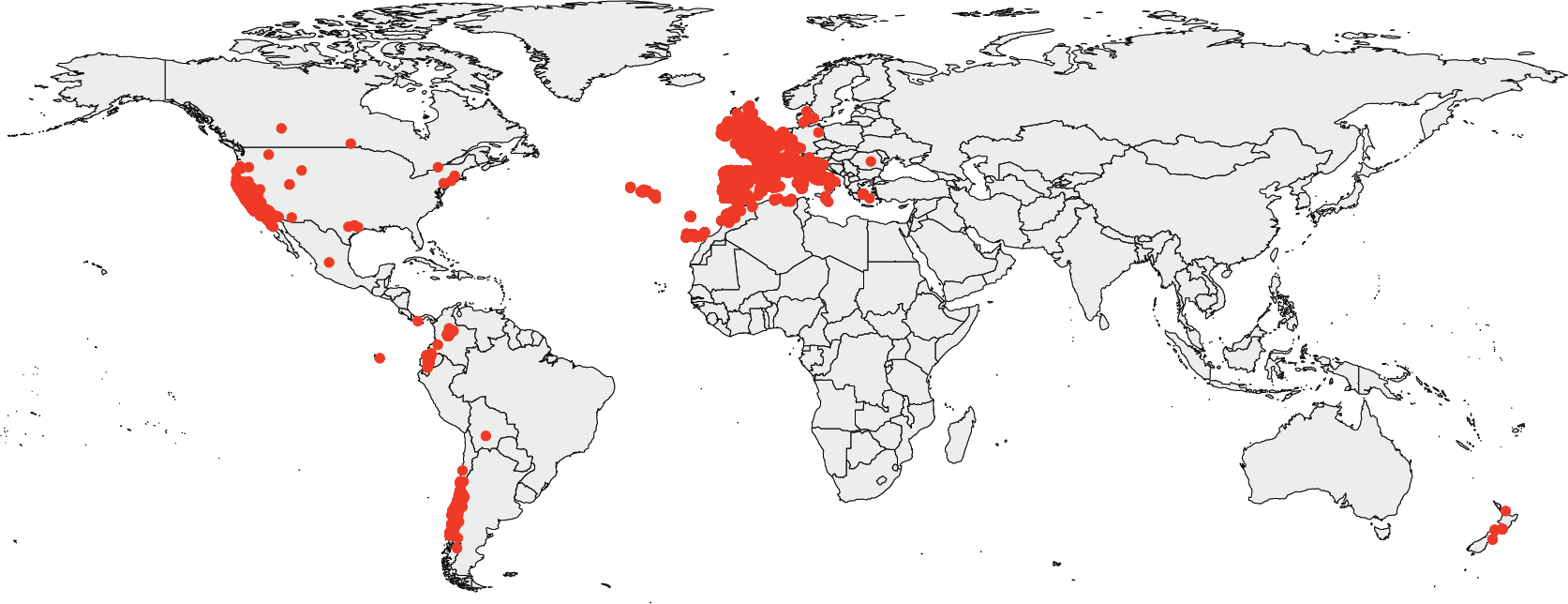

= Steatoda nobilis =

Species of spider

Steatoda nobilis is a spider in the genus Steatoda, known in the United Kingdom as the noble false widow, as it superficially resembles, and is frequently mistaken for, the black widow and other spiders in the genus Latrodectus. It is often referred to as the false widow, although "false widow" is a more general term applied to a wider group of species with this resemblance.^{[a]} It is a moderately medically significant spider, with most bites resulting in symptoms similar to a bee or wasp sting. Some bites may cause more significant harm, partly due to pathogenic bacteria from the spiders.

S. nobilis is spotted all year round, both indoors and outdoors in a variety of habitats including cacti, roadside cuttings, and demolished buildings. The spiders prey on both invertebrates and small vertebrates using an "attack wrap" strategy where silk is wrapped around the victim.

Steatoda nobilis is native to Madeira and the Canary Islands from where it is thought to have spread to Europe, and continued to spread to other parts of the world including the United States, Chile and Colombia. They are considered to be one of the world's most invasive species of spider.

== Description ==
Steatoda nobilis has a brown bulbous abdomen with cream coloured markings that are often likened to the shape of a skull. Their legs are reddish-orange. Both female and male S. nobilis can be distinguished from other spiders of the same genus by their large size and typical colouration. Females range in size from about 9.5 to 14 mm in size, while males are 7 to 11 mm. The largest females are 13.7 mm in size, while the largest males can be 11.66 mm in size. The males can be distinguished by their conformation of the palp and by their ventral abdominal markings. The females can be distinguished by their epigyne. The variation in size, shape and markings that have been observed is not thought to be due to location. Spiders found centimetres apart and siblings born from the same egg sac can look very different.

Male and female juvenile spiders are indistinguishable from each other.

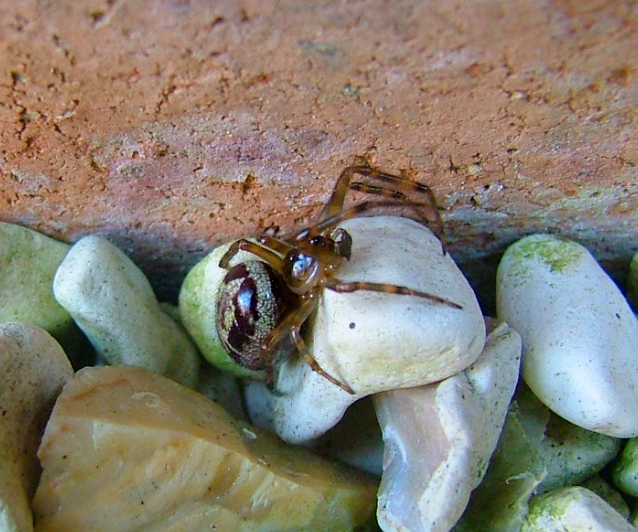
Male with swollen pedipalps

== Distribution, habitat and ecology ==
=== Distribution ===
The spider is originally from the Canary Islands and Madeira. It is an introduced species across Europe, parts of the United States and North Africa, and likely spreading. It was found for the first time in 2011 in Cologne, Germany. In England it has been reported mostly in southern counties, but its range was reported to be expanding northwards in the 21st century. In 2011, the spider was reported as an established invasive species in the USA, in Ventura County, California. In January 2016, it was reported that Steatoda nobilis had been found in Chile, the first time that the species had been recorded in the southern hemisphere. Research published in December 2018 showed that it was also established in Colombia and Ecuador. The spider has been in New Zealand since at least 2023. It is considered to be one of the world's most invasive species of spider. Seaside cities and villages with a temperate climate are especially favourable habitats for S. nobilis.

The first recorded observation of S. nobilis in England dates back to 1879. The first recorded observation of S. nobilis in Ecuador was in 2014 at several locations as high as 2800 meters.

Between 1985 and 2010 there was no reporting of large numbers of S. nobilis anywhere, and scientists consider this to be a typical lag phase that is a phenomenon observed in many invasive species. Afterwards there was a large accelerated spread observed all over the globe.

They are able to establish in urban environments and build large populations in a short time.

=== Habitat ===
Steatoda nobilis can be found year round, regardless of the climate, and they can be found both indoors and outdoors. They have been observed in a variety of different places from cacti and agave to roadside cuttings and buildings. They have also been found on telegraph poles, concrete fence posts, and ivy growing on walls. In Ireland they have been observed to be restricted to man-made habitats such as on steel, concrete or timber structures in urbanised area and not commonly found in forests or dunes. In another study conducted in Ireland, the adult spiders were exclusively found on steel, concrete or timber structures in urban areas. In California they have also been observed in urban habitats but have also been observed to spread into natural habitats.

Juveniles are observed living in small crevices and holes, which can make their eradication difficult. In Dublin, juveniles have been observed on vegetation and leaves.

In Ireland, they were observed to be captured by common suburban spiders like the cellar spider or the lace-webbed spider.

=== Population expansion in UK and Ireland ===
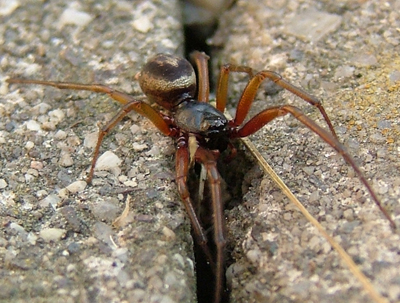
Steatoda nobilis, Hampshire, England

The distribution of Steatoda nobilis is expected to increase northwards in the UK, due at least partly to mild winters in recent years. This prediction was reported by Stuart Hine of the Natural History Museum, and is substantiated by the National Recording Scheme.

The spider is reported to be an established species in Ireland. The first recorded sighting of the species occurred in the east of Ireland in Bray, Co. Wicklow in 1997.

== Diet ==
=== Hunting strategy ===
Steatoda nobilis uses an effective "attack wrap" strategy to immobilise would-be prey or predators, meaning that they are in close contact to their prey/predator. Prey is captured in typical theridiid fashion, where silk is wrapped around the victim using the spider’s fourth legs, allowing the spider to bite the victim. Their venom allows them to immobilise their prey by inducing paralysis. S. nobilis have been observed biting insects and spiders which causes a rapid reduction in motor function, most likely due to the release of venom. Their potent venom allows them to capture vertebrates much larger than themselves; the spider has been observed feeding on pipistrelle bats.

=== Adult diet ===
S. nobilis can eat both vertebrates and invertebrates. In Ireland, they were observed to eat woodlice. All of S. nobilis’s liquid requirements are observed to come from its prey. In laboratories they seem to thrive without water and in extremely dry conditions. In Ireland they have been observed to prey on protected reptile species. In southern England, an adult female was observed to haul up and digest a pygmy shrew ten times the spider's size.

== Webs ==
As with other members of the family Theridiidae, Steatoda nobilis constructs a cobweb which is an irregular tangle of sticky silken fibres. Its scaffold web differs from others of the genus in the exceptional strength of the silk, and in the tubular retreat that is at least partly concealed in a deep crack or hole. They produce three dimensional cobwebs. The web is developed slowly, starting as a typical theridiid tangled web and gradually takes on the characteristic form over several days. They have poor eyesight and depend mostly on vibrations reaching them through their webs to orient themselves to prey or warn them of larger animals that could injure or kill them.

== Reproduction and life cycle ==
=== Egg laying ===
Before oviposition, the female produces an irregular, silky brooding chamber that does not have an entrance. They spend about two to ten days in the chamber producing the egg sacs. The egg sacs are spherical or pear-shaped. When the egg sacs are produced a first layer of loose silk is wrapped around the eggs and then a second layer of denser silk is added. The egg sacs are about 5-12mm in diameter and are suspended by threads inside the brooding chamber. Each egg sac contains 94 eggs on an average but the numbers can range from 34 to 208 eggs.

The spiderlings will emerge from their chorion 18 days after egg production, and remain within the egg sac. After the first moult, the spiderlings will emerge from the egg sac. At this point they are able to capture and consume small live prey.

The period of time between mating, egg-laying and emergence of spiderlings can vary, and is temperature dependent. They are able to build several egg sacs within one season, and one study found that one female spider produced four egg sacs within four months.

S. nobilis can produce large amounts of offspring for a long period after mating.

=== Lifespan ===
The S. nobilis spiders have a high longevity, with a lifespan of up to five years. They have a fast reproductive rate and are cold tolerant with year-round activity.

Adult females are observed to be long-lived and persistent. One adult S. nobilis female was reported to live almost five and a half years in captivity.

== Mating ==
After locating a female’s web, Steatoda nobilis males pluck or tap the web in a rhythmic way with the second pair of legs. This is accompanied by brief bursts of abdominal vibrations, during which the male uses his first pair of legs to search for the female. If the legs make contact with the female, the male will repeatedly jab his palps into the epigyne until the palps are inserted.

Males are able to produce stridulation sounds during courtship, by scraping 10-12 teeth on the abdomen against a file on the rear of the carapace.

== Bites to humans and animals ==
S. nobilis presents a unique risk because of their synanthropic habits, especially in temperate regions, that bring them in close contact to humans. They are considered one of the most dangerous spiders in western Europe. The mechanical bite from an adult S. nobilis is usually painless. It is the release of venom that causes the intense pain commonly reported. Male bites are less severe than those of females.

=== Venom ===
Two thirds of the venom is composed of latrodectus-like toxins. Their venom is mainly composed of peptidase, serine protease, alpha latrotoxin and delta lactroinsectotoxin. Peptidase and serine protease are both pancreatic lipases and chitinases (enzymes) that help with digestion. Alpha-latrotoxin and delta latroinsectotoxin are toxins. About 49% of the venom is toxins, 15% are enzymes, 18% are proteins with other functions and 18% are proteins with unknown functions.

Alpha-latrotoxin works by creating a pore in the neurons and allowing an influx of Ca2+. This triggers an efflux of neurotransmitters, and once all the neurotransmitters leave, the signals between nerve and muscles are blocked. This leads to neuromuscular paralysis.

The venom of S. nobilis serves two functions: immobilisation of prey or predators and the predigestion of prey. The spider is able to efficiently and safely capture prey that are often much larger or stronger than themselves via the rapid paralysis and immobilisation tactic. Their venom is fast acting and can subdue both invertebrate and vertebrate prey. The range of enzymes in the venom suggest that the venom also functions to pre-digest the prey. One example is the enzyme Chitinase which can breakdown the exoskeleton (shell) of arthropods.

=== Symptoms and reaction ===
The symptoms of a bite are typically similar to a bee or wasp sting. However, the bite of Steatoda nobilis, along with others in its genus, can also produce a set of symptoms known as steatodism. These symptoms include intense pain radiating from the bite site, along with feverishness or general malaise. Other symptoms observed in humans after envenomation include prolonged, moderate to intense pain, swelling, erythema, piloerection, diaphoresis, facial flushing, vasodilation of capillaries localized near the site of the bite. Anaphylactic shock has been reported in some unconfirmed cases. There are also many reports of more severe reactions to suspected noble false widow bites. In November 2006, it was reported that a man from Dorchester spent three days in Dorset County Hospital with symptoms of heart seizure, which the doctor attributed to a spider bite.

Bacterial ulceration, a common risk arising from many minor injuries, may be a complication relating to the bite of Steatoda nobilis. Without proper treatment, this issue may develop into life-threatening gangrene or sepsis. In December 2020, a study by scientists at NUI Galway determined that the noble false widow vectors pathogenic bacteria, and that some are antibiotic resistant. It carries bacteria on its chelicerae and the surface of its body. Twelve pathogenic bacterial species were isolated, including Kluyvera intermedia and Pseudomonas putida. This showed that infections may be due to the spider bite directly, rather than opportunistic bacteria present on the skin. In October 2013, following a Steatoda nobilis bite, a man from London was treated for a bacterial infection with antibiotics and required his leg to be drained of pus. In October 2026, a man spent four days in hospital following a bite.

== Media reaction ==
Sensationalised stories about the bite of Steatoda nobilis have featured in UK newspaper articles. Stuart Hine from the Natural History Museum, London responded on the naturenet blog, stating, "Of course I also explain the great value of spiders and how rare the event of spider bite in the UK actually is. I also always explain that up to 12 people die from wasp/bee stings in the UK each year and we do not panic so much about wasps and bees – but this never makes it past editing." Steven Falk, an entomologist, cautioned that without "hard evidence", it is difficult to know how many of the bites reported in the media have been caused by false widow spiders. The arrival of Steatoda nobilis in Chile in 2016 led to a similar media reaction.

While the media response is often exaggerated, Oxford University zoologist Clive Hambler noted that arachnologists should be careful not to automatically dismiss stories of extreme reactions. Instead, he argues that they should collaborate with medical professionals to compile these stories, and examine them with a critical eye to better understand the risks posed by bites.

== Notes ==
a. The full English name for Steatoda nobilis is "noble false widow". Media coverage usually abbreviates this to "false widow", although Steatoda nobilis is one of several false widows; Steatoda grossa and Steatoda paykulliana are other examples of false widow spiders.
