= Steatoda fagei =

Oudtshoorn false button spider

Scientific classification
- Kingdom: Animalia
- Phylum: Arthropoda
- Subphylum: Chelicerata
- Class: Arachnida
- Order: Araneae
- Infraorder: Araneomorphae
- Family: Theridiidae
- Genus: Steatoda
- Species: S. fagei

Binomial name
- Steatoda fagei (Lawrence, 1964)

Synonyms
- Teutana fagei Lawrence, 1964

Species of spider

Steatoda fagei is a species of spider in the family Theridiidae. It is endemic to the Western Cape of South Africa and commonly known as the Oudtshoorn false button spider. It is named for the French zoologist Louis Fage, and so should be pronounced /ˈfɑːʒiː/.

== Distribution ==
Steatoda fagei is known only from South Africa, where it has been recorded from the Western Cape at altitudes ranging from 211 to 357 m. Locations include Skeleton Cave in Oudtshoorn and a cave in Bredasdorp.

== Habitat and ecology ==
Steatoda fagei constructs three-dimensional webs in dark places. The species has been sampled from caves.

== Description ==
Only the female is known. The carapace, sternum, and mouthparts are brown with a slight reddish tinge. The radiations from the thoracic fovea are a little darker, otherwise without markings.

Legs from coxae to tarsi are uniform brown with a faint olive tinge. The abdomen above is reddish violet with a recurved white transverse stripe at the anterior apex with a short backwardly projecting stripe in the middle. Posterior to this are two pairs of ill-defined elongate white markings. Above the spinners is a short median elongate marking followed by a transverse series of three to four very fine white lines.

== Conservation ==
The status of the species remains uncertain. Additional sampling is needed to collect males and to determine the species' range. The species is therefore listed as Data Deficient for taxonomic reasons.

== Taxonomy ==
Steatoda fagei was described by Lawrence in 1964 as Teutana fagei from Skeleton Cave in Oudtshoorn. The species has not been revised and is known only from the female.
