= Steatoda hespera =

Scientific classification
- Kingdom: Animalia
- Phylum: Arthropoda
- Subphylum: Chelicerata
- Class: Arachnida
- Order: Araneae
- Infraorder: Araneomorphae
- Family: Theridiidae
- Genus: Steatoda
- Species: S. hespera

Binomial name
- Steatoda hespera Chamberlin & Ivie, 1933

Species of spider

Steatoda hespera is a species of cobweb spider in the family Theridiidae. It is found in the United States and Canada.
