= Steatoda connexa =

Cape False Button Spider

Scientific classification
- Kingdom: Animalia
- Phylum: Arthropoda
- Subphylum: Chelicerata
- Class: Arachnida
- Order: Araneae
- Infraorder: Araneomorphae
- Family: Theridiidae
- Genus: Steatoda
- Species: S. connexa

Binomial name
- Steatoda connexa (O. Pickard-Cambridge, 1904)

Synonyms
- Teutana connexa O. Pickard-Cambridge, 1904

Species of spider

Steatoda connexa is a species of spider in the family Theridiidae. It is endemic to the Western Cape of South Africa.

== Distribution ==
Steatoda connexa is known only from South Africa, where it is known only from Muizenberg on the Cape Peninsula in the Western Cape.

== Habitat and ecology ==
Steatoda connexa constructs three-dimensional webs in dark places. The species is known from the Fynbos biome and has been collected from under stones.

== Conservation ==
The status of the species remains uncertain. Additional sampling is needed to collect males and to determine the species' range. The species is therefore listed as Data Deficient for taxonomic reasons.

== Taxonomy ==
Steatoda connexa was described by O. Pickard-Cambridge in 1904 as Teutana connexa from the Cape Peninsula. The type locality is given only as Cape Peninsula. The species is known only from the type locality.

The original description was based on a female specimen collected on the Cape Peninsula from under stones in association with specimens of S. capensis. The type has been lost, but based on the drawings and description, it might be the cosmopolitan S. grossa.

The species has not been revised and is known only from the female.
