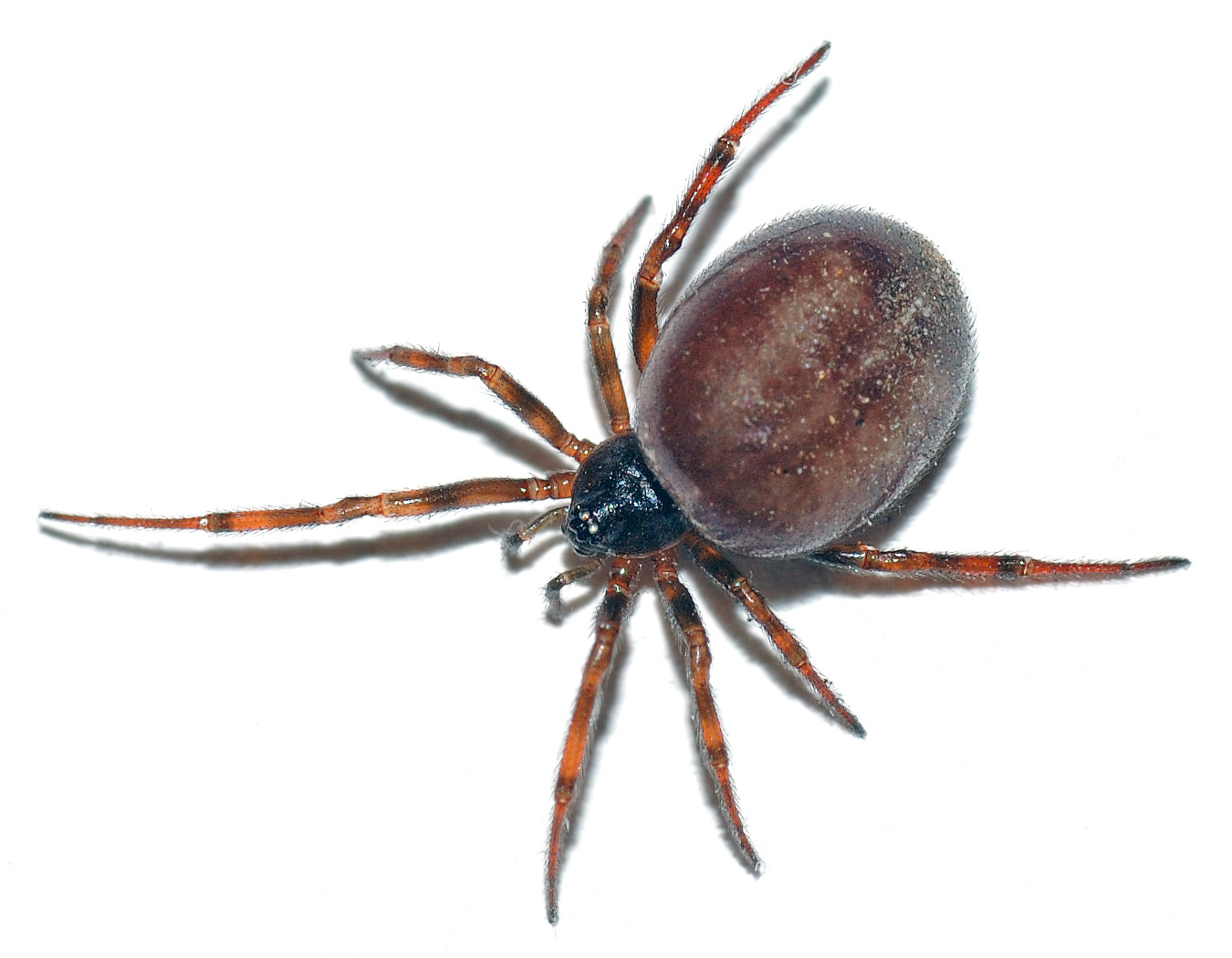
- Female Steatoda bipunctata

Scientific classification
- Kingdom: Animalia
- Phylum: Arthropoda
- Subphylum: Chelicerata
- Class: Arachnida
- Order: Araneae
- Infraorder: Araneomorphae
- Family: Theridiidae
- Genus: Steatoda; Sundevall, 1833

Species
- See text.

Diversity
- c. 120 species

= Steatoda =

Steatoda Temporal range: Palaeogene–present

Genus of spiders

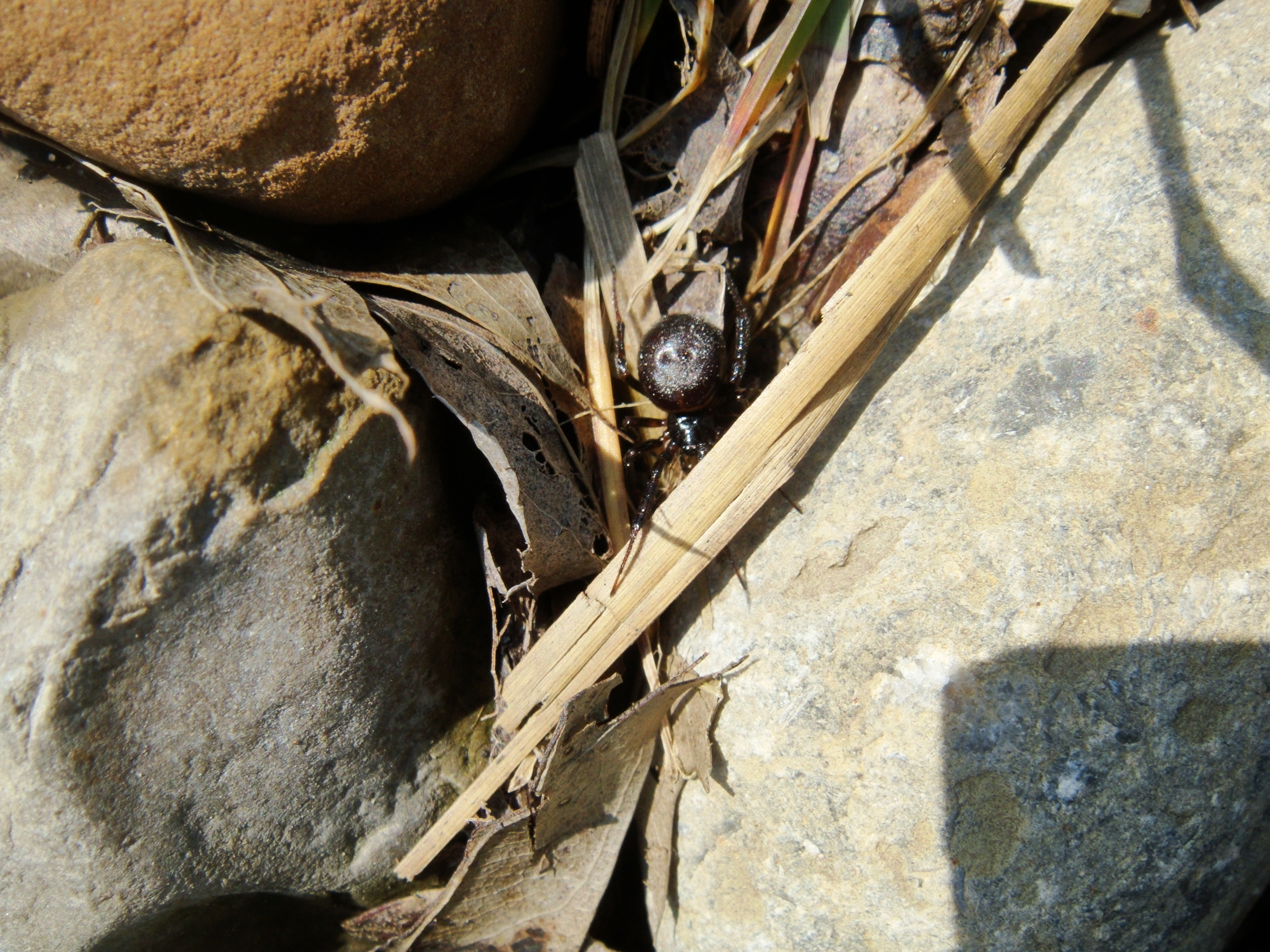
Steadota bipunctata

The spider genus Steatoda, in the family Theridiidae, includes about 120 recognized species, distributed around the world (including many cosmopolitan species which are found among human populations worldwide). One common name is cupboard spider, for many species build their webs in dark, sheltered, undisturbed places around the house or garden, in sheds and garages, in compost bins, and in cupboards and dark nooks and corners. Signs of a Steatoda spider include a messy, tangled web with small white spots of spider droppings and insect exoskeletons in the area underneath the web.

Many spiders of the genus Steatoda are often mistaken for widow spiders (Latrodectus), and are known as false widows. The two genera are closely related – both occurring in the same family, Theridiidae – but Steatoda are significantly less harmful to humans. Not all Steatoda species resemble black widows – they come in many different colors and sizes, mostly smaller than Latrodectus species. Steatoda paykulliana can grow larger than the black widow, and Steatoda castanea looks more like a brown widow.

== Description ==
The eye arrangement of spiders in the genus Steatoda

The colour can range from sandy pale brown to reddish plum to satiny black. Like most spiders, its cephalothorax is smaller than its abdomen, which is somewhat egg-shaped, and can have white or beige to orange markings. Although sometimes not or partially visible, these markings usually consists of a frontal crescent, often with a dorsal line or triangular shapes or both. Orange to reddish-marked Steatoda paykulliana can be mistaken for the redback spider).

In common with other members of the family Theridiidae, Steatoda construct a tangled web, i.e., an irregular tangle of sticky silken fibers. These spiders have very poor eyesight and depend mostly on vibrations reaching them through their webs to orient themselves to prey or to warn them of larger animals that could injure or kill them.

== Confused with black widows ==
Those commonly mistaken for widows include:

- S. borealis. A common species in North America, often mistaken for the black widow (despite being smaller and having colored markings on the dorsal side of the abdomen, rather than the ventral side).
- S. capensis, the black cobweb or false katipo spider. It originates in South Africa, and is found in Australia and New Zealand; in the latter location it is often confused with the katipō spider.
- S. grossa, often known as the cupboard spider. A dark-colored spider which resembles specimens of Latrodectus, though without the characteristic red hourglass marks found on most widow spiders. Bites by S. grossa are rare but painful. Originally from Europe, but now found worldwide.
- S. nobilis. This spider, a native of the Canary Islands, has since been introduced into the United Kingdom and across Europe. and sensationalized stories about the bite of Steatoda nobilis have featured in UK newspaper articles. Its bite is reported to be painful, but normally no worse than a wasp sting,
- S. paykulliana, another spider which is often confused with Latrodectus. This one is generally found in the range of Latrodectus tredecimguttatus and is frequently confused with it. Has a medically significant (but not serious) bite.

== Notable species ==
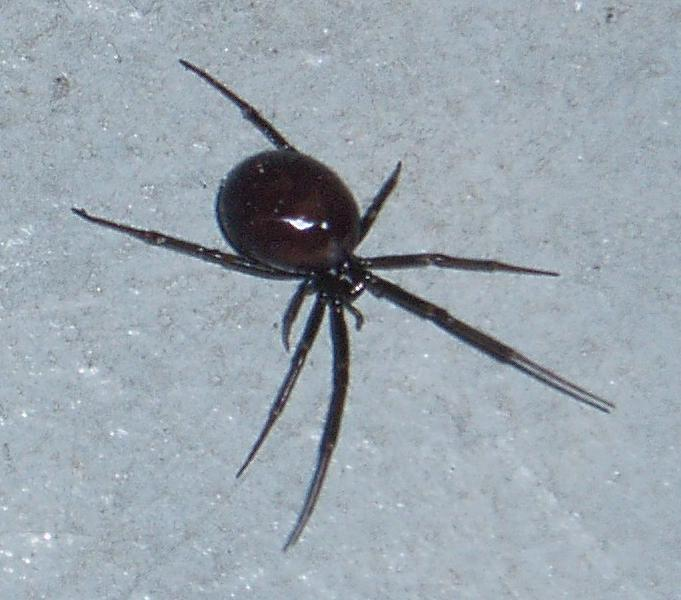
A Steatoda found in Australia.

Other notable and recognizable species in the genus include:

- S. bipunctata. A common house spider in Europe.
- S. triangulosa, the triangulate cobweb spider, a common household spider noted for a pattern of triangles on the dorsal side of its abdomen. Not known to bite; found worldwide.
- S. hespera, the western bud spider. This species is commonly found in the western United States and Canada, where it is an effective predator of the hobo spider. It is often confused with the black widow, despite being significantly smaller (7 to 8 mm) and having no bright-colored markings. Not known to bite humans, but has a venom which is similar to S. paykulliana (a medically significant spider of this genus).

== Diet ==
Steatoda is known to prey on other spiders (including true black widows), crickets, ladybugs, cockroaches, and woodlice.

== Bites ==
Some members of this genus do have bites which are reported to have generalized symptoms in humans (such as S. grossa and S. nobilis). However total number of cases are rare with one ever in France and England each, and 5 in Ireland. A review by Isbister noted 23 over 3 years in Australia. No bites have required medical treatment, and bites by Steatoda species generally do not have any long-lasting effects. Symptoms can include moderate to severe pain increasing for the first hour (without severe sweating). Some people have reported mild to moderate nausea, headache, and lethargy. The duration of all symptoms and effects can range from 1 to 60 hours.

The symptoms associated with the bite of several Steatoda species have been named steatodism; and have been described as a less-severe form of latrodectism (the symptoms associated with a widow spider bite). The redback spider antivenom has been thought to be effective at treating bites from S. grossa, after it was mistakenly administered to a S. grossa bite victim who was erroneously believed to have been bitten by the far more dangerous redback. (While the redback antivenom appears clinically active against arachnidism caused by Steatoda spiders,^{[68][100][101][102]} as these cases are often mild and the evidence of its effectiveness is limited, this treatment is not recommended.)^{[90]}

Steatoda spiders are not aggressive, and most injuries to humans are due to defensive bites delivered when a spider is squeezed or pinched. It is possible that some bites result when a spider mistakes a finger thrust into its web for another arthropod, but intrusion by any large creature will cause these spiders to flee.

== Species ==
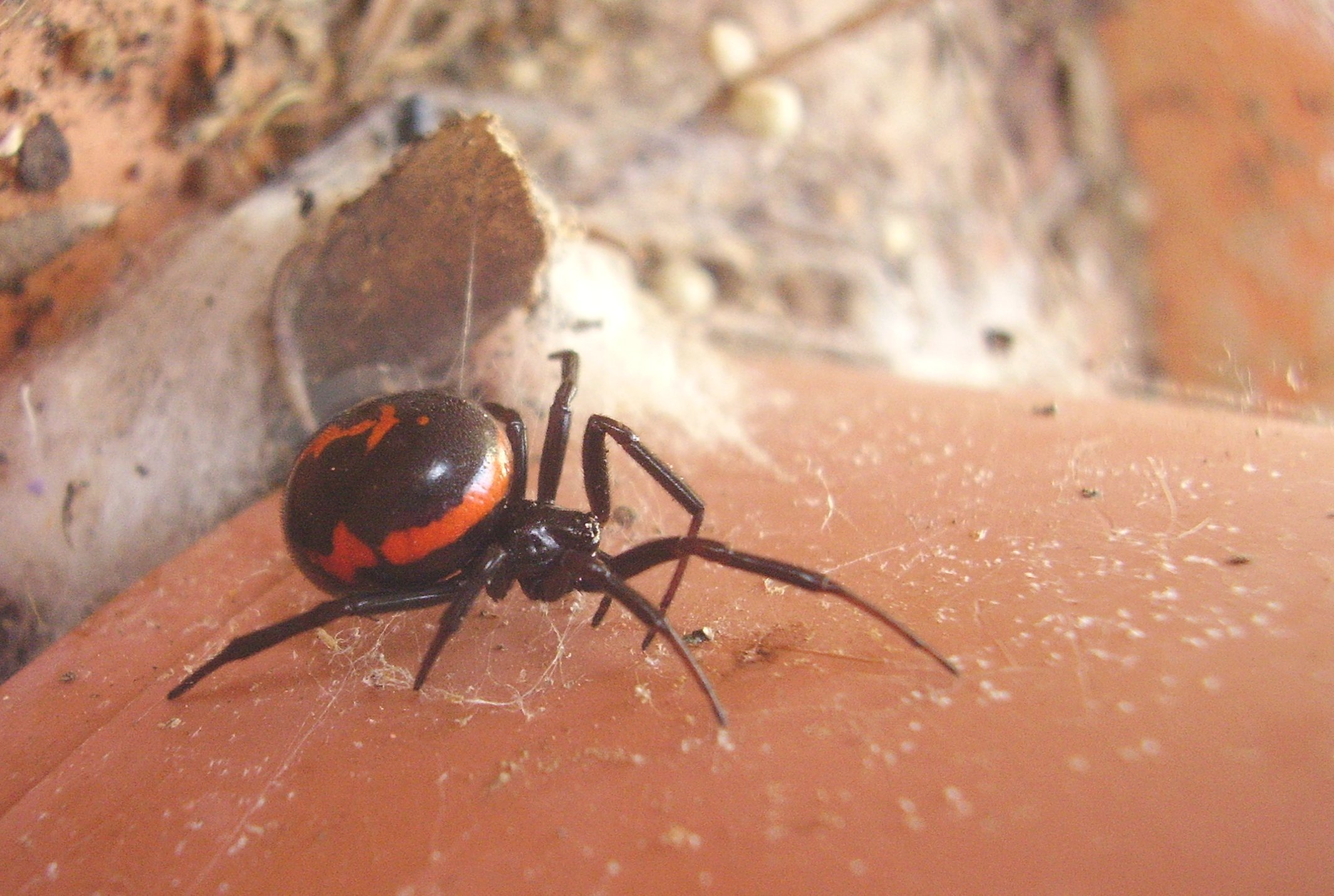
Steatoda paykulliana

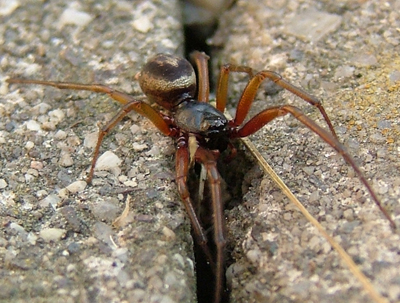
Steatoda nobilis

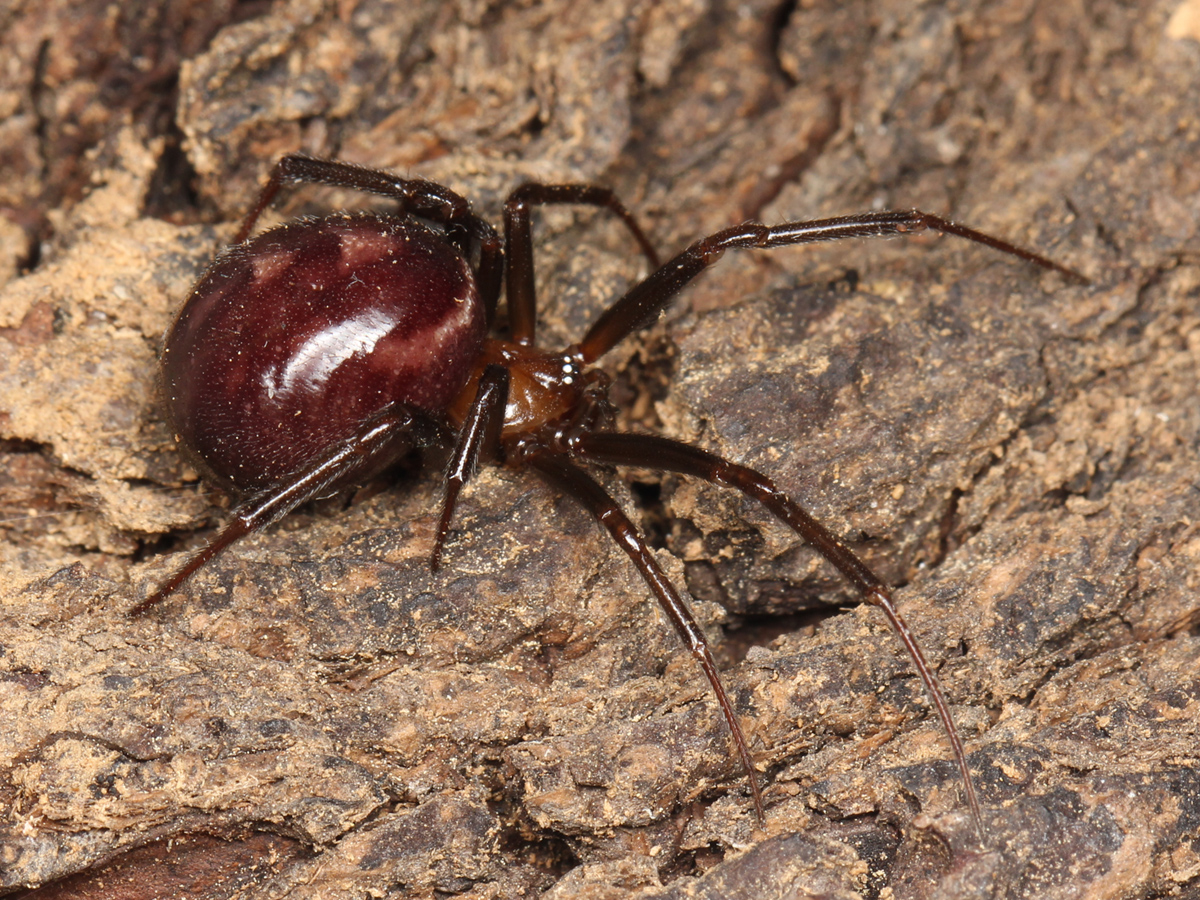
Steatoda grossa

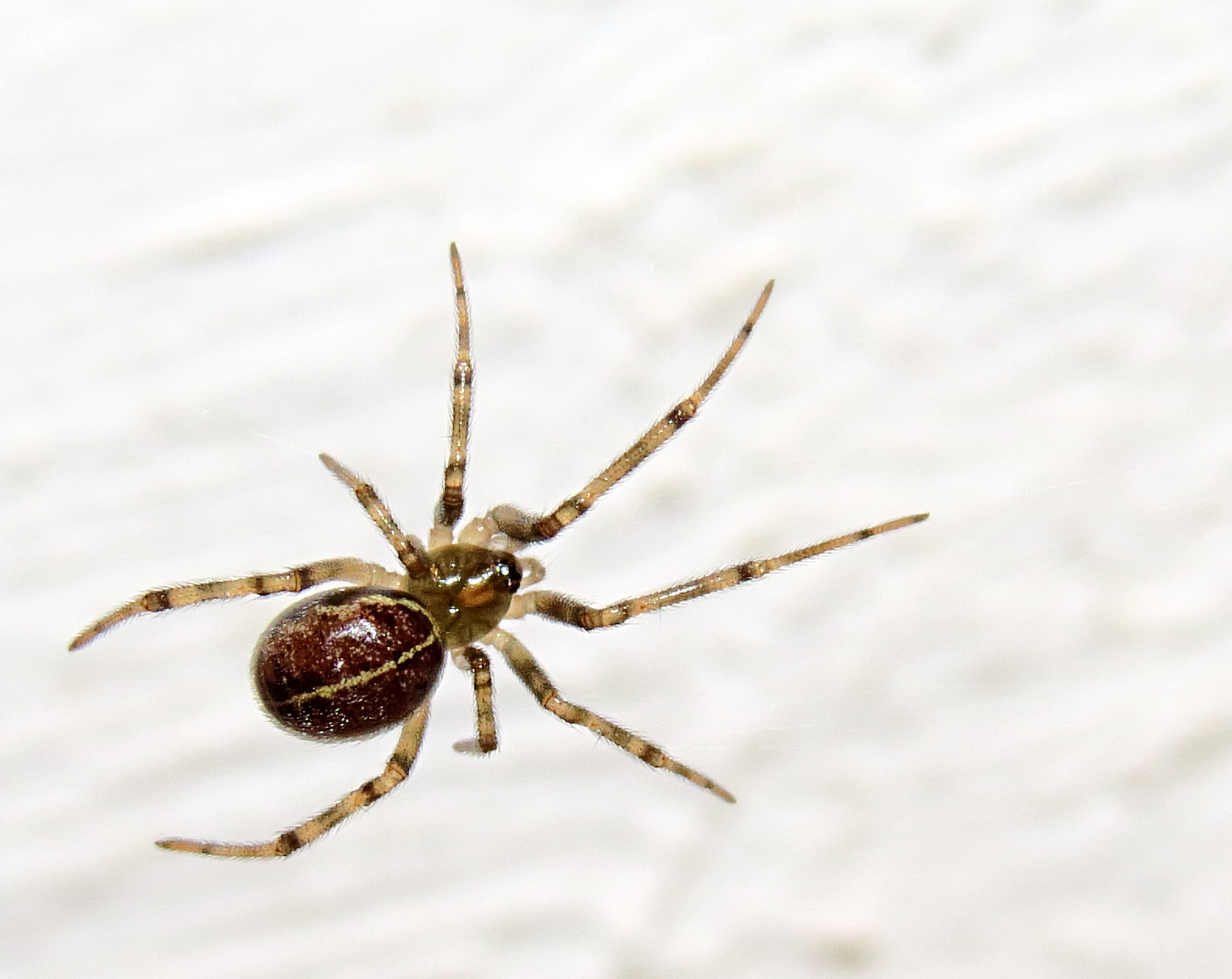
Steatoda castanea

As of October 2025, this genus includes 118 species and two subspecies:

- Steatoda adumbrata (Simon, 1908) – Australia (Western Australia)
- Steatoda aethiopica (Simon, 1909) – Central Africa
- Steatoda alamosa Gertsch, 1960 – United States, Mexico
- Steatoda albocincta (Lucas, 1846) – Portugal, Spain, France, Italy (Sardinia), Morocco, Algeria, Libya
- Steatoda alboclathrata (Simon, 1897) – India
- Steatoda albomaculata (De Geer, 1778) – North America, Europe, North Africa, Russia (Europe to Far East), Caucasus, Middle East, Iran, Kazakhstan, Central Asia, India, China, Korea, Japan
- Steatoda anchorata (Holmberg, 1876) – Mexico to Chile
- Steatoda ancora (Grube, 1861) – Russia (South Siberia)
- Steatoda andina (Keyserling, 1884) – Venezuela to Chile
- Steatoda apacheana Gertsch, 1960 – United States
- Steatoda atascadera Chamberlin & Ivie, 1942 – United States
- Steatoda atrocyanea (Simon, 1880) – New Caledonia, Loyalty Is.
- Steatoda autumnalis (Banks, 1898) – Mexico
- Steatoda badia (Roewer, 1961) – Senegal
- Steatoda bertkaui (Thorell, 1881) – Indonesia (Moluccas), New Guinea
- Steatoda bipunctata (Linnaeus, 1758) – Europe, North Africa, Turkey, Israel, Caucasus, Russia (Europe to Far East), Kazakhstan, Iran, Central Asia, China. Introduced to Canada, South America
- Steatoda borealis (Hentz, 1850) – Alaska, Canada, United States
- Steatoda capensis Hann, 1990 – Namibia, South Africa, Lesotho. Introduced to St. Helena, Australia, New Zealand, Hawaii
- Steatoda carbonaria (Simon, 1907) – DR Congo, Equatorial Guinea (Bioko)
  - S. c. minor (Simon, 1907) – Congo
- Steatoda caspia Ponomarev, 2007 – Kazakhstan
- Steatoda castanea (Clerck, 1757) – Europe, Turkey, Russia (Europe to Far East), Caucasus, Iran, Central Asia, China. Introduced to Canada (type species)
- Steatoda chinchipe Levi, 1962 – Ecuador, Peru
- Steatoda cingulata (Thorell, 1890) – India, China, Korea, Japan, Vietnam, Laos, Indonesia (Sumatra, Java)
- Steatoda concolor (Caporiacco, 1933) – Algeria, Tunisia, Libya
- Steatoda connexa (O. Pickard-Cambridge, 1904) – South Africa
- Steatoda craniformis Zhu & Song, 1992 – China
- Steatoda dahli (Nosek, 1905) – Turkey, Israel, Caucasus, Russia, (Europe), Iran
- Steatoda diamantina Levi, 1962 – Brazil
- Steatoda dickjonesi Bosselaers & Van Keer, 2024 – Pyrenees (Spain, France)
- Steatoda distincta (Blackwall, 1859) – Madeira
- Steatoda ephippiata (Thorell, 1875) – Algeria, Tunisia, Libya, Egypt, Israel, Iran
- Steatoda erigoniformis (O. Pickard-Cambridge, 1872) – North Africa, Greece, Cyprus, Turkey, Azerbaijan, Middle East, India, China, Korea, Japan. Introduced to United States, Caribbean, Venezuela, Cape Verde, South Africa
- Steatoda fagei (Lawrence, 1964) – South Africa
- Steatoda fallax (Blackwall, 1865) – Cape Verde
- Steatoda felina (Simon, 1907) – Congo
- Steatoda foravae Dippenaar-Schoeman & Müller, 1992 – South Africa
- Steatoda grandis Banks, 1901 – United States
- Steatoda grossa (C. L. Koch, 1838) – Europe, Turkey, Russia (Europe to Far East), Caucasus, Iran, Kazakhstan, Central Asia, China, Korea, Japan. Introduced to North and South America, Macaronesia, St. Helena, Africa, New Zealand, Hawaii
- Steatoda gui Zhu, 1998 – China
- Steatoda hespera Chamberlin & Ivie, 1933 – Canada, United States
- Steatoda hui Zhu, 1998 – China
- Steatoda ifricola Lecigne, Lips, Moutaouakil & Oger, 2020 – Morocco
- Steatoda iheringi (Keyserling, 1886) – Brazil, Paraguay, Argentina
- Steatoda ingeae Van Keer, 2024 – Morocco
- Steatoda kiwuensis (Strand, 1913) – Central Africa
- Steatoda koeni Van Keer, 2024 – Morocco
- Steatoda kuytunensis Zhu, 1998 – China
- Steatoda latifasciata (Simon, 1873) – Canary Islands, Italy (Sicily), North Africa, Israel, Jordan
- Steatoda lawrencei Brignoli, 1983 – South Africa
- Steatoda leonardi (Thorell, 1898) – Myanmar
- Steatoda lepida (O. Pickard-Cambridge, 1880) – New Zealand
- Steatoda linzhiensis Hu, 2001 – China
- Steatoda livens (Simon, 1895) – Australia (Tasmania)
- Steatoda longurio (Simon, 1909) – Central Africa
- Steatoda mainlingensis (Hu & Li, 1987) – Kyrgyzstan, China
- Steatoda mainlingoides Yin, Griswold, Bao & Xu, 2003 – China
- Steatoda marta Levi, 1962 – Colombia
- Steatoda maura (Simon, 1909) – Morocco, Greece, Turkey, Israel, Iran
- Steatoda mexicana Levi, 1957 – United States, Mexico
- Steatoda micans (Hogg, 1922) – Vietnam
- Steatoda minima (Denis, 1955) – Niger
- Steatoda moesta (O. Pickard-Cambridge, 1896) – Mexico to Brazil
- Steatoda mormorata (Simon, 1910) – South Africa
- Steatoda morsitans (O. Pickard-Cambridge, 1885) – South Africa
- Steatoda nahuana Gertsch, 1960 – Mexico
- Steatoda nasata (Chrysanthus, 1975) – Indonesia (Krakatau), Papua New Guinea (New Ireland), Australia
- Steatoda ngipina Barrion & Litsinger, 1995 – Philippines
- Steatoda nigrimaculata Zhang, Chen & Zhu, 2001 – China
- Steatoda nigrocincta O. Pickard-Cambridge, 1885 – Pakistan, and China, (Yarkand)
- Steatoda niveosignata (Simon, 1908) – Australia (Western Australia)
- Steatoda nobilis (Thorell, 1875) – Macaronesia. Introduced to United States, Chile, Ecuador, Colombia, St. Helena, Europe, Turkey
- Steatoda octonotata (Simon, 1908) – Australia (Western Australia)
- Steatoda pallens Zamani & Marusik, 2025 – Iran
- Steatoda palomara Chamberlin & Ivie, 1935 – United States
- Steatoda pardalia Yin, Griswold, Bao & Xu, 2003 – China
- Steatoda paykulliana (Walckenaer, 1806) – Europe, Mediterranean to Central Asia, India
- Steatoda pengyangensis Hu & Zhang, 2012 – China
- Steatoda perakensis Simon, 1901 – Malaysia
- Steatoda perspicillata (Thorell, 1898) – Myanmar
- Steatoda picea (Thorell, 1899) – Cameroon
- Steatoda porteri (Simon, 1900) – Chile
- Steatoda punctulata (Marx, 1898) – United States, Mexico
- Steatoda quadrimaculata (O. Pickard-Cambridge, 1896) – USA to Venezuela, Caribbean
- Steatoda quaesita (O. Pickard-Cambridge, 1896) – Mexico
- Steatoda quinquenotata (Blackwall, 1865) – Cape Verde
- Steatoda retorta González, 1987 – Argentina
- Steatoda rhombifera (Grube, 1861) – Russia (Middle Siberia)
- Steatoda rubrocalceolata (Simon, 1907) – Equatorial Guinea (Bioko)
- Steatoda rufoannulata (Simon, 1899) – India, Sri Lanka, Sumatra, Java
- Steatoda sabulosa (Tullgren, 1901) – Bolivia, Argentina, Chile
- Steatoda saltensis Levi, 1957 – Mexico
- Steatoda seriata (Simon, 1899) – Indonesia (Sumatra)
- Steatoda singoides (Tullgren, 1910) – Tanzania
- Steatoda sordidata O. Pickard-Cambridge, 1885 – China (Yarkand)
- Steatoda speciosa (Thorell, 1898) – Myanmar
- Steatoda spina Gao & Li, 2014 – China
- Steatoda subannulata (Kulczyński, 1911) – New Guinea (Indonesia, Papua New Guinea)
- Steatoda terastiosa Zhu, 1998 – China
- Steatoda terebrui Gao & Li, 2014 – China
- Steatoda tigrina (Tullgren, 1910) – Tanzania
- Steatoda tortoisea Yin, Griswold, Bao & Xu, 2003 – China
- Steatoda transversa (Banks, 1898) – United States, Mexico
- Steatoda trianguloides Levy, 1991 – Portugal, Spain, France (Corsica), Greece, Turkey, Cyprus, Israel, Iran
- Steatoda triangulosa (Walckenaer, 1802) – Europe, North Africa, Turkey, Caucasus, Russia (Europe to Far East), Jordan, Iraq, Iran, Kazakhstan, Central Asia, India, China, Korea. Introduced to Canada, United States, Argentina, Canary Islands, South Africa
- Steatoda tristis (Tullgren, 1910) – Tanzania
- Steatoda truncata (Urquhart, 1888) – New Zealand
- Steatoda ulleungensis Paik, 1995 – Korea
- Steatoda uncata Zhang, Chen & Zhu, 2001 – China
- Steatoda variabilis (Berland, 1920) – East Africa
- Steatoda variata Gertsch, 1960 – United States, Mexico
  - S. v. china Gertsch, 1960 – United States, Mexico
- Steatoda variipes (Keyserling, 1884) – Peru
- Steatoda vaulogeri (Simon, 1909) – Vietnam
- Steatoda verae Van Keer, 2024 – Spain
- Steatoda wangi Zhu, 1998 – China
- Steatoda wanshou Yin, 2012 – China
- Steatoda washona Gertsch, 1960 – United States, Mexico
- Steatoda xerophila Levy & Amitai, 1982 – Israel
- Steatoda xishuiensis Zhang, Chen & Zhu, 2001 – China
