= Steatoda mormorata =

Steinkopf False Button Spider

Scientific classification
- Kingdom: Animalia
- Phylum: Arthropoda
- Subphylum: Chelicerata
- Class: Arachnida
- Order: Araneae
- Infraorder: Araneomorphae
- Family: Theridiidae
- Genus: Steatoda
- Species: S. mormorata

Binomial name
- Steatoda mormorata (Simon, 1910)

Synonyms
- Steassa mormorata Simon, 1910; Steassa marmorata Roewer, 1942

Species of spider

Steatoda mormorata is a species of spider in the family Theridiidae. It is endemic to the Northern Cape of South Africa and commonly known as the Steinkopf false button spider.

== Distribution ==
Steatoda mormorata is known only from South African province Northern Cape at altitudes ranging from 86 to 1,195 m. Locations include Steinkopf, Kamaggas, and Witsand Nature Reserve.

== Habitat and ecology ==
Steatoda mormorata constructs three-dimensional webs in dark places, usually close to the substrate. The species is frequently found under stones. It has been sampled from the Succulent Karoo biome.

== Conservation ==
Steatoda mormorata is listed as Least Concern. Although only known from one sex, the species has a wide distribution and occurs in an area that has extensive suitable habitats. The species is protected in Witsand Nature Reserve.

== Taxonomy ==
Steatoda mormorata was described by Simon in 1910 as Steassa mormorata from Steinkopf. The species has not been revised and is known only from the female.
