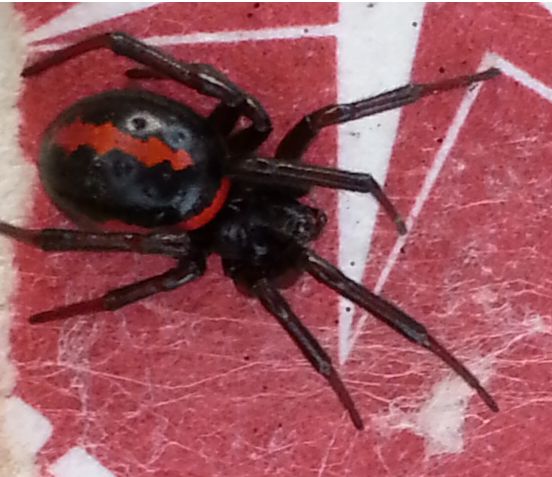

Scientific classification
- Kingdom: Animalia
- Phylum: Arthropoda
- Subphylum: Chelicerata
- Class: Arachnida
- Order: Araneae
- Infraorder: Araneomorphae
- Family: Theridiidae
- Genus: Steatoda
- Species: S. paykulliana

Binomial name
- Steatoda paykulliana Walckenaer, 1805

Synonyms
- Steatoda latrodectoides (Franganillo, 1913)

= Steatoda paykulliana =

Species of arachnid

Steatoda paykulliana is a species of false black widow spider in the tangle-web spiders family, native to the Mediterranean countries, Southern Europe and Western Asia. The species is named in honor of the Swedish naturalist Gustaf von Paykull (1757–1826).

== Description ==
As is evident from one of the common names associated with Steatoda species, false widow, S. paykulliana resembles black widow spiders in shape and color markings. The female S. paykulliana body length is from 8 mm, to 12 mm when pregnant. The abdomen is globular, colored a shiny black, with two non-overlapping stripes, one dorsal and one lateral. This differentiates it from true black widow spiders that have dorsal and ventral markings. The stripes are ivory-yellow on young females and orange-red on mature ones. The male is only about half the size of the female, with less prominent markings.

S. paykulliana's venom is much less potent than the true black widows', and its effect on humans is minor, similar to a wasp sting.

== Behavior ==
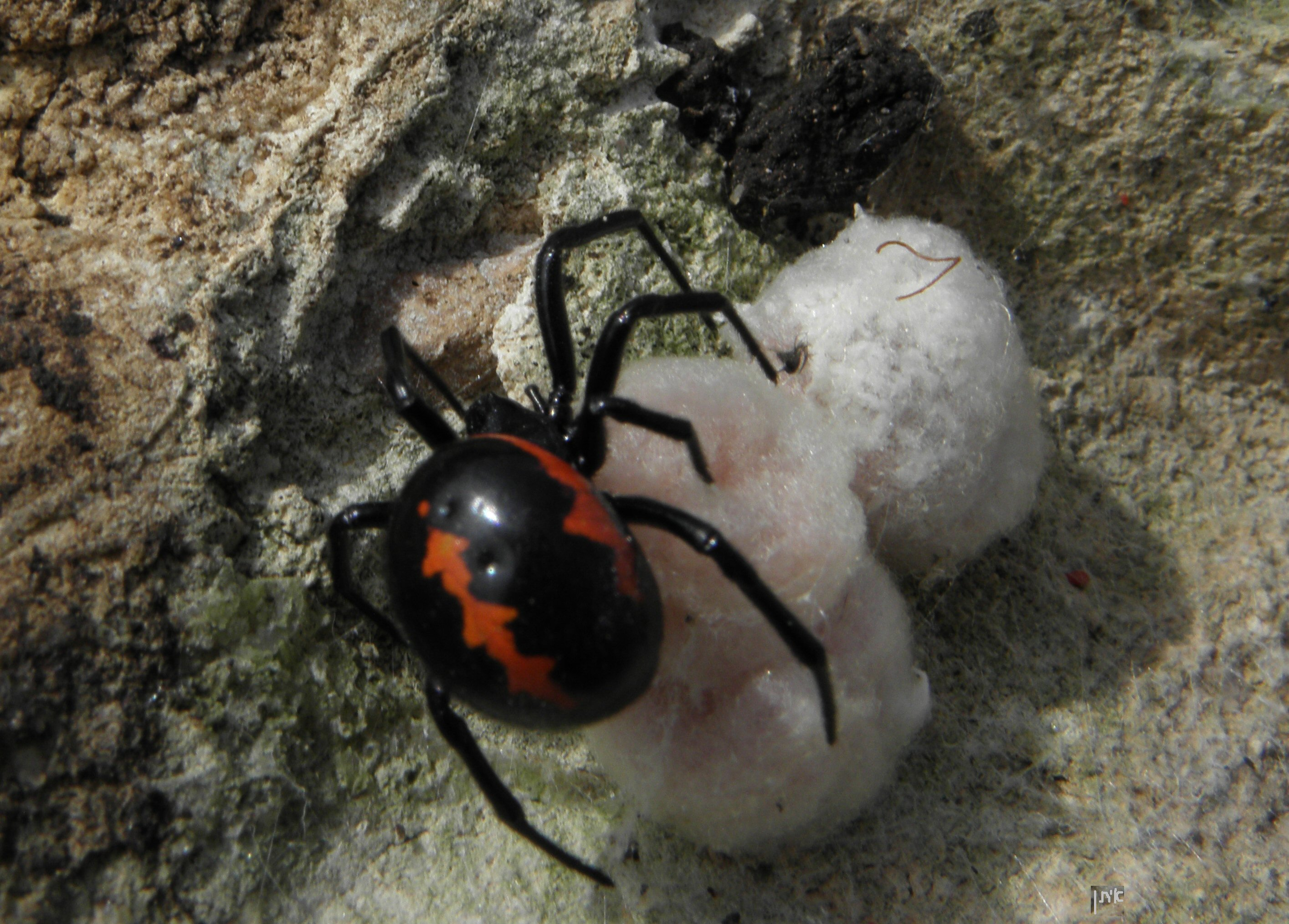
Female S. paykulliana taking care of its egg sac.

S. paykulliana spins typical tangled three-dimensional webs, usually on sloping ground covered with vegetation. A cocoon is spun around the eggs. In countries of former Yugoslavia, the spiderlings hatch at the end of summer, hibernate in the winter, and reach adulthood at the beginning of the next summer.

== Distribution ==
S. paykulliana is widespread throughout Europe, Asia, and the Middle East. It has been reported in Portugal, Spain, France including Corsica, Belgium, Italy, Switzerland, Austria, Slovenia, Croatia, Serbia, Bosnia and Herzegovina, North Macedonia, Albania, Romania, Ukraine, Bulgaria, Greece, Malta, Turkey, Georgia, Lebanon, Syria, Israel, Palestine, Azerbaijan, Dagestan, Russia, Northwest China, Kazakhstan, Southern Kyrgyzstan, Tajikistan, Uzbekistan, Turkmenistan, Iran, Saudi Arabia, Yemen, Egypt, Ethiopia, Eritrea, Libya, Tunisia, Algeria, Morocco, the Netherlands and Great Britain. Cyprus.
