= Steatoda rufoannulata =

Scientific classification
- Kingdom: Animalia
- Phylum: Arthropoda
- Subphylum: Chelicerata
- Class: Arachnida
- Order: Araneae
- Infraorder: Araneomorphae
- Family: Theridiidae
- Genus: Steatoda
- Species: S. rufoannulata

Binomial name
- Steatoda rufoannulata (Simon, 1899)

Synonyms
- Teutana rufoannulata Simon, 1899

Species of spider

Steatoda rufoannulata, is a species of spider of the genus Steatoda. It is found in India, Java, Sri Lanka, and Sumatra.
