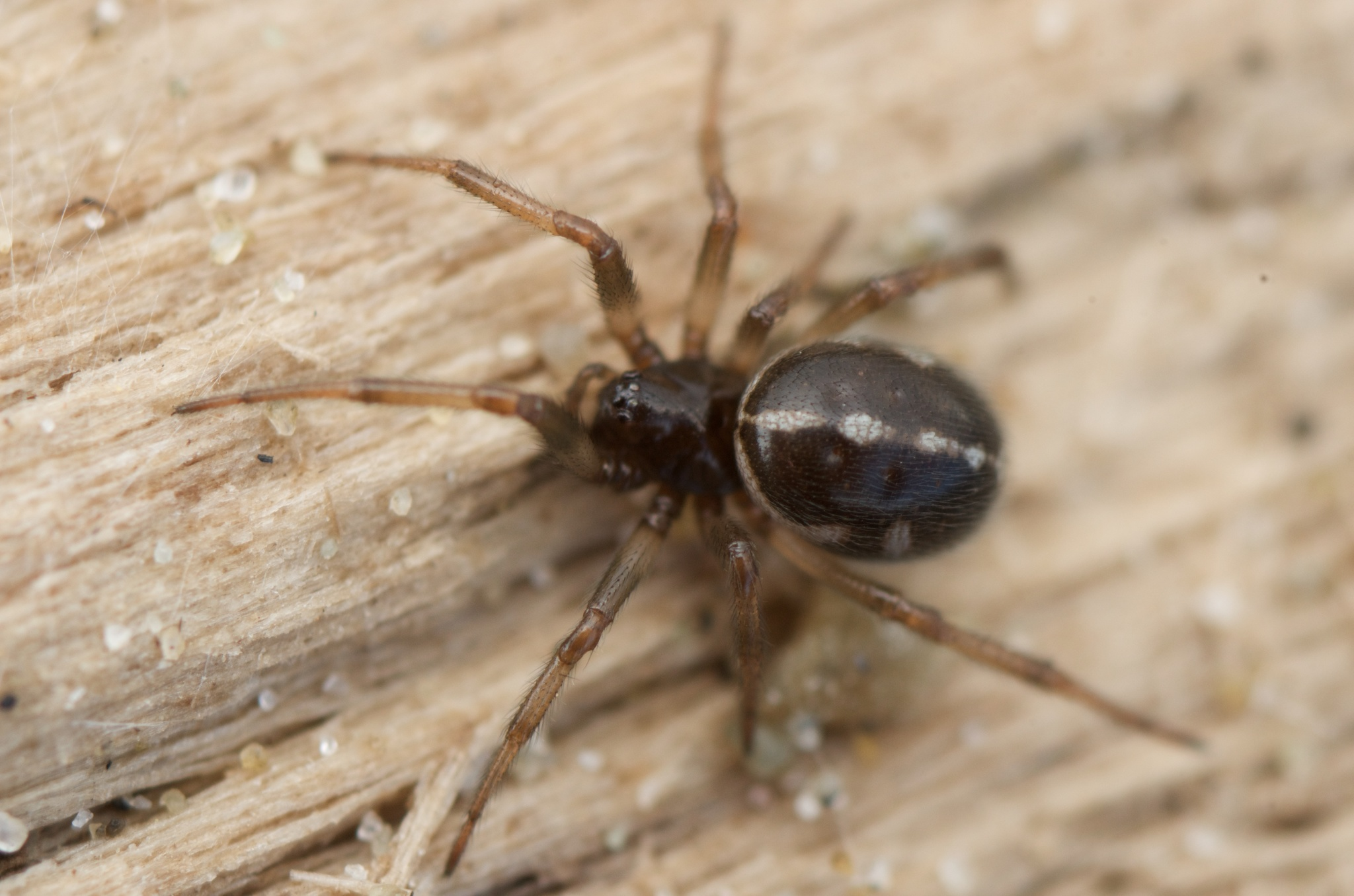

Conservation status
- Not Threatened (NZ TCS)

Scientific classification
- Domain: Eukaryota
- Kingdom: Animalia
- Phylum: Arthropoda
- Subphylum: Chelicerata
- Class: Arachnida
- Order: Araneae
- Infraorder: Araneomorphae
- Family: Theridiidae
- Genus: Steatoda
- Species: S. truncata

Binomial name
- Steatoda truncata (Urquhart, 1888)

Synonyms
- Theridium truncatum Lithyphantes lepidus

= Steatoda truncata =

Species of spider

Steatoda truncata is a species of Theridiidae that is endemic to New Zealand.

== Taxonomy ==
This species was described in 1888 by Arthur Urquhart from female specimens. It was most recently revised in 1994. The holotype is stored in Otago Museum.

== Description ==
The male is recorded at 3.6mm in length whereas the female is 3.2 - 4.9mm. The carapace is coloured blackish. The legs are yellowish brown. The abdomen is blackish with white markings.

== Distribution and habitat ==
This species is widespread throughout New Zealand. It is typically found under stones along rivers or under logs in coastal areas.

== Conservation status ==
Under the New Zealand Threat Classification System, this species is listed as "Not Threatened".
