= Steatoda fallax =

Scientific classification
- Domain: Eukaryota
- Kingdom: Animalia
- Phylum: Arthropoda
- Subphylum: Chelicerata
- Class: Arachnida
- Order: Araneae
- Infraorder: Araneomorphae
- Family: Theridiidae
- Genus: Steatoda
- Species: S. fallax

Binomial name
- Steatoda fallax Blackwall, 1865

Synonyms
- Theridion fallax (Blackwall, 1865)

Species of spider

Steatoda fallax is a species of spiders of the family Theridiidae that is endemic in Cape Verde. The species was first described as Theridion fallax by John Blackwall in 1865.
