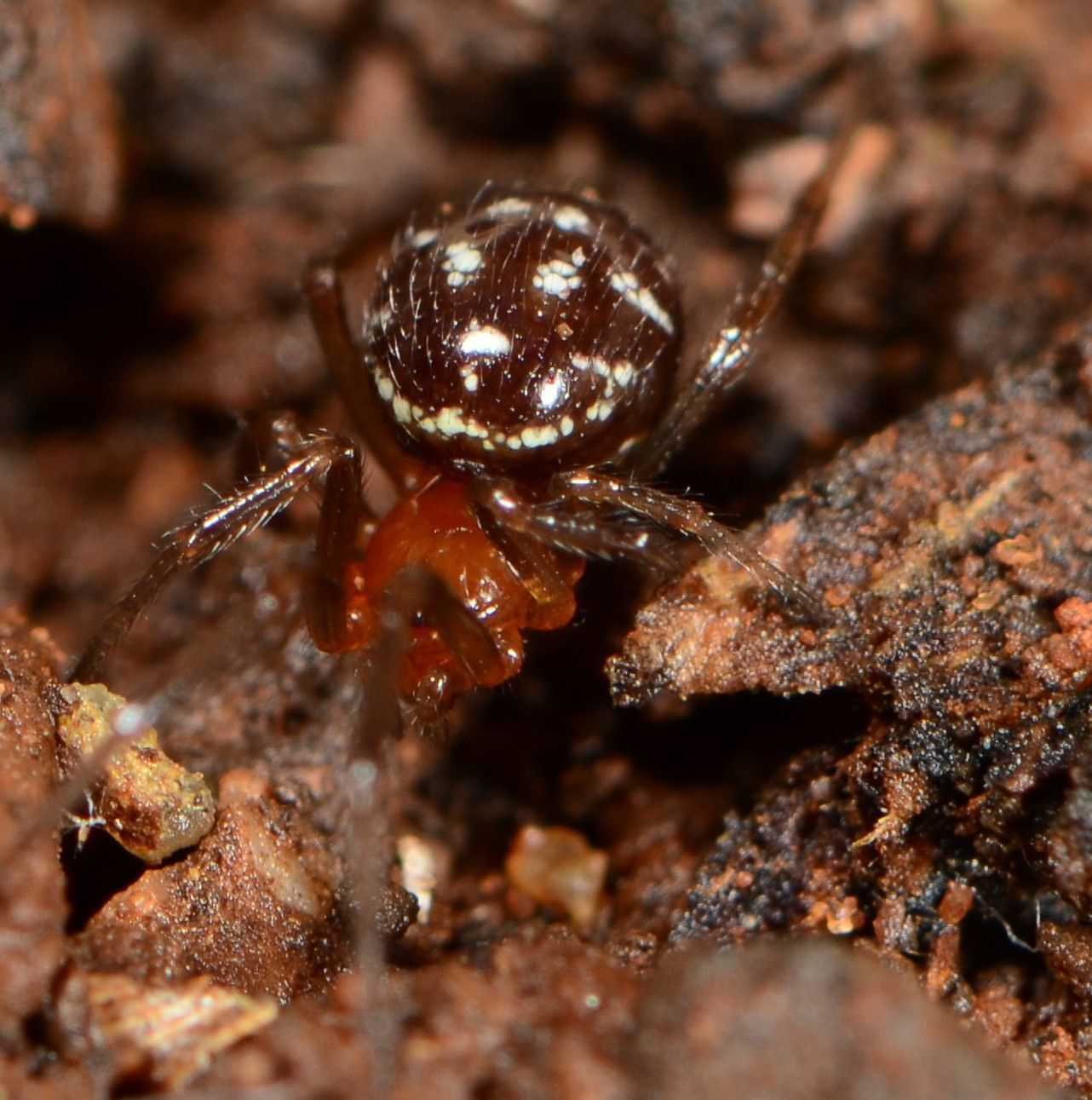
- Female
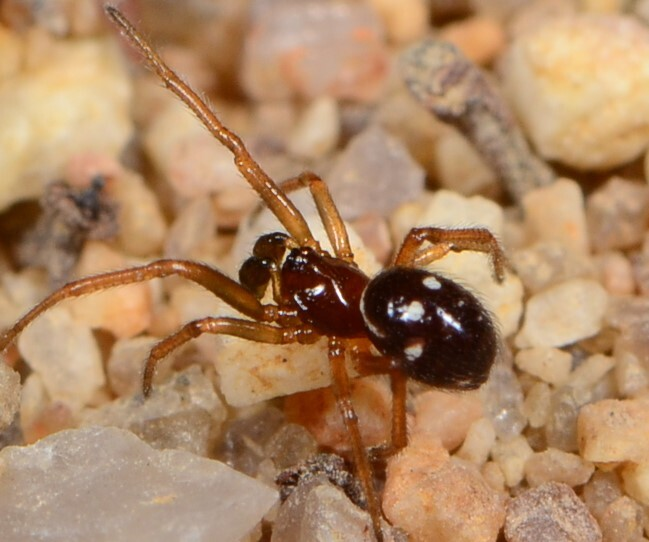
- Male

Scientific classification
- Kingdom: Animalia
- Phylum: Arthropoda
- Subphylum: Chelicerata
- Class: Arachnida
- Order: Araneae
- Infraorder: Araneomorphae
- Family: Theridiidae
- Genus: Steatoda
- Species: S. erigoniformis

Binomial name
- Steatoda erigoniformis (O. Pickard-Cambridge, 1872)

Synonyms
- Theridion erigoniforme O. Pickard-Cambridge, 1872; Steatoda signata O. Pickard-Cambridge, 1876; Crustulina signata Simon, 1881; Lithyphantes septemmaculatus Keyserling, 1884; Asagenella erigoniformis Schenkel, 1937; Euryopis albomaculata Denis, 1952; Steatoda septemmaculata Levi, 1957; Steatoda septemmaculatus Hu, 1984

= Steatoda erigoniformis =

False Button Spider

Species of spider

Steatoda erigoniformis is a species of cobweb spider in the family Theridiidae. It is found in a range from the East Mediterranean to the Near East, Caucasus, China, Korea, Japan, and has been introduced into the Caribbean.

== Distribution ==
Steatoda erigoniformis is found across North Africa, Greece, Cyprus, Turkey, Azerbaijan, the Middle East, India, China, Korea, and Japan. The species has been introduced to the United States, the Caribbean, Venezuela, Cape Verde, and South Africa.

In South Africa, the species has been recorded from six provinces at altitudes ranging from 53 to 2,985 m.

== Habitat and ecology ==
Steatoda erigoniformis constructs three-dimensional webs in dark places.

In South Africa, the species was especially abundant in crops such as cotton, maize, and tomato fields. It has been sampled from the Grassland, Nama Karoo, and Savanna biomes.

== Description ==
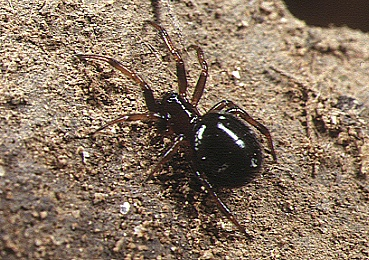
female

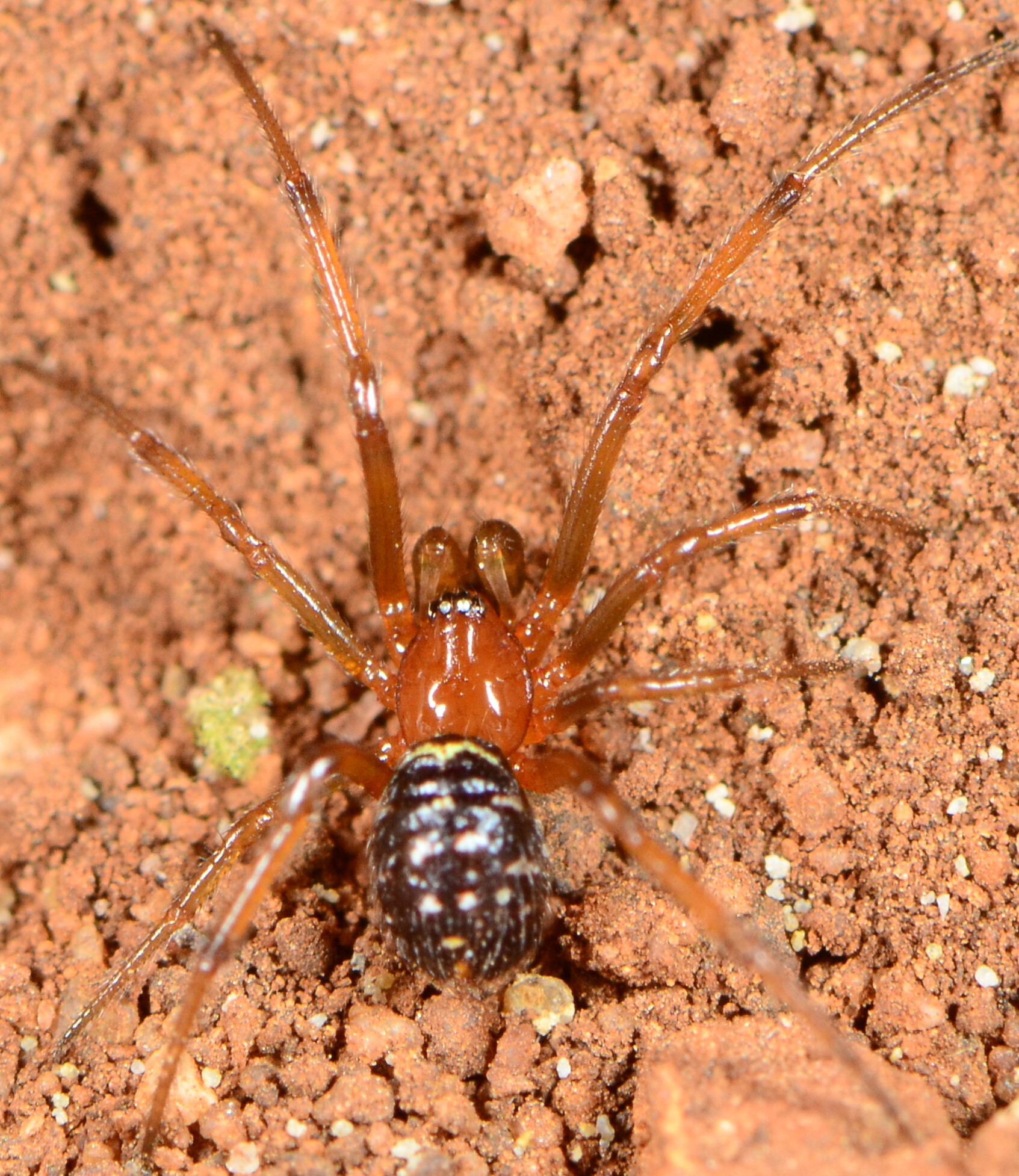
male

== Conservation ==
Steatoda erigoniformis is listed as Least Concern due to its wide geographical range. The species is protected in Ophathe Game Reserve and Ndumo Game Reserve.

== Taxonomy ==
Steatoda erigoniformis was described by O. Pickard-Cambridge in 1872 as Theridion erigoniforme. The species has been introduced to several countries. Several species have been synonymized with S. erigoniformis, including Steatoda septemmaculata, S. signata, and Euryopis albomaculata. The species has not been revised.
