= Steatoda foravae =

Grootvadersbos False Button Spider

Scientific classification
- Kingdom: Animalia
- Phylum: Arthropoda
- Subphylum: Chelicerata
- Class: Arachnida
- Order: Araneae
- Infraorder: Araneomorphae
- Family: Theridiidae
- Genus: Steatoda
- Species: S. foravae

Binomial name
- Steatoda foravae Dippenaar-Schoeman & Müller, 1992

Species of spider

Steatoda foravae is a species of spider in the family Theridiidae. It is endemic to South Africa and commonly known as the Grootvadersbos false button spider.

== Distribution ==
Steatoda foravae is known only from South Africa, where it has been recorded from two provinces at altitudes ranging from 125 to 932 m. Locations include Grootvadersbos near Heidelberg, Silaka Nature Reserve, Swartberg Nature Reserve, and Tulbagh.

== Habitat and ecology ==
Steatoda foravae constructs three-dimensional webs in dark places, usually close to the substrate.

The species has been found in large numbers in the indigenous forest Grootvadersbos, which forms part of the Boosmansbos Wilderness Area. These spiders build their webs beneath logs, stones, and other debris, under bark, or in crevices in boulders, rock faces, and tree trunks up to a height of 2 m.

== Venom ==
Investigation into the relative toxicity to laboratory mice showed that S. foravae is at least 10 to 12 times less venomous than the black button Latrodectus indistinctus.

== Conservation ==
Steatoda foravae is listed as Least Concern due to its wide geographical range. The species is protected in Silaka Nature Reserve, Grootvadersbos Nature Reserve, and Swartberg Nature Reserve.

== Taxonomy ==
Steatoda foravae was described by Dippenaar-Schoeman and Müller in 1992 from Grootvadersbos near Heidelberg.
