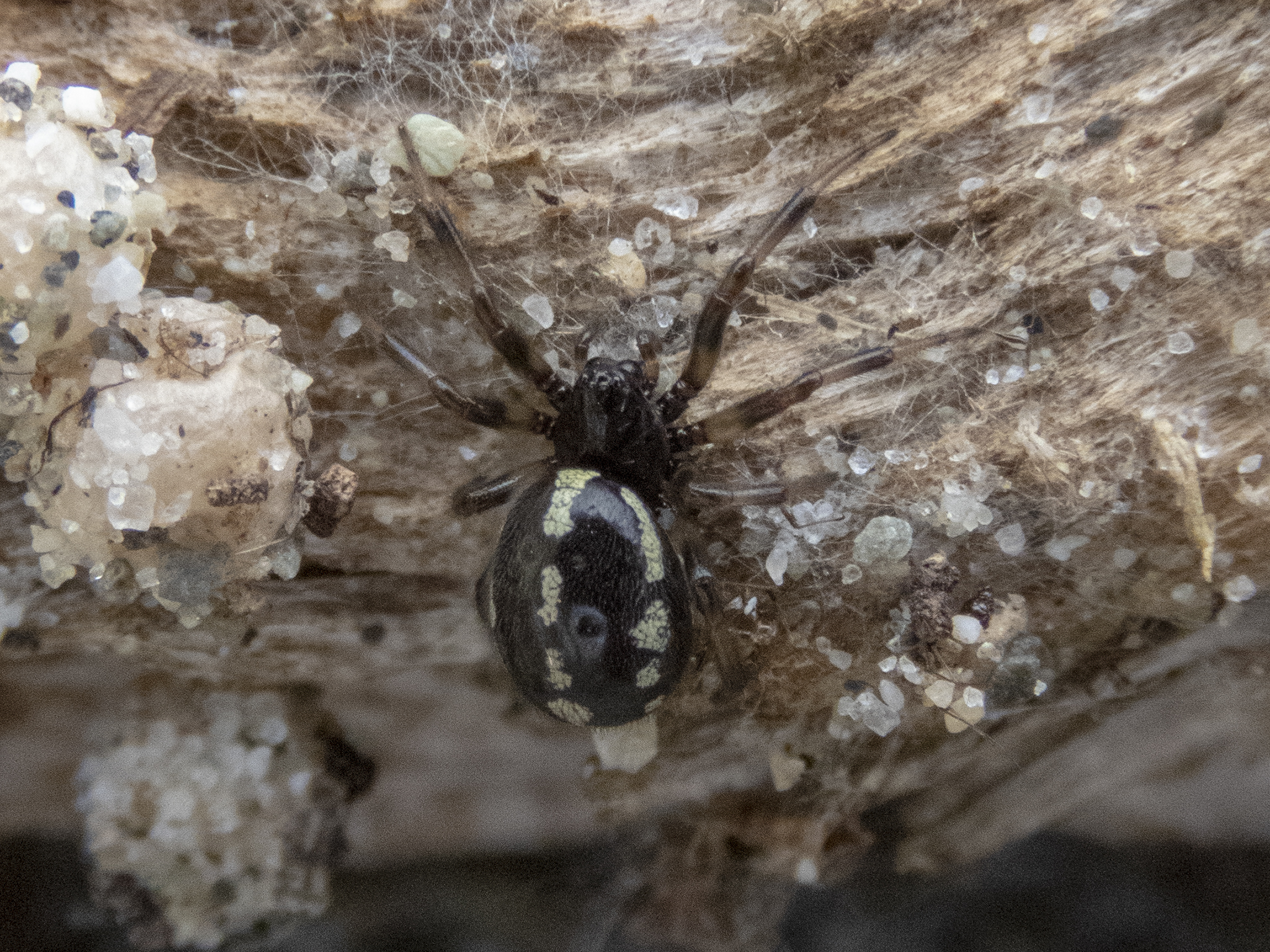
- Female Steatoda lepida

Conservation status
- Not Threatened (NZ TCS)

Scientific classification
- Domain: Eukaryota
- Kingdom: Animalia
- Phylum: Arthropoda
- Subphylum: Chelicerata
- Class: Arachnida
- Order: Araneae
- Infraorder: Araneomorphae
- Family: Theridiidae
- Genus: Steatoda
- Species: S. lepida

Binomial name
- Steatoda lepida (O. Pickard-Cambridge, 1880)

Synonyms
- Lithyphantes lepidus Theridium triloris Lithyphantes regius Steatoda regia

= Steatoda lepida =

Species of spider

Steatoda lepida is a species of Theridiidae that is endemic to New Zealand.

== Taxonomy ==
Steatoda lepida was first described in 1880 as Lithyphantes lepidus. In 1886, it was independently described again as Theridium triloris by Arthur Urquhart. In 1935, Elizabeth Bryant recognized T. triloris as a synonym of L. lepidus. S. lepida was independently described again in 1956 as Lithyphantes regius. In 1983, L. regius was recognized as belonging to the Steatoda genus and was subsequently named Steatoda regius. In 1994, S. regius was recognized as a synonym of L. lepidus and the two were merged to form S. lepida.

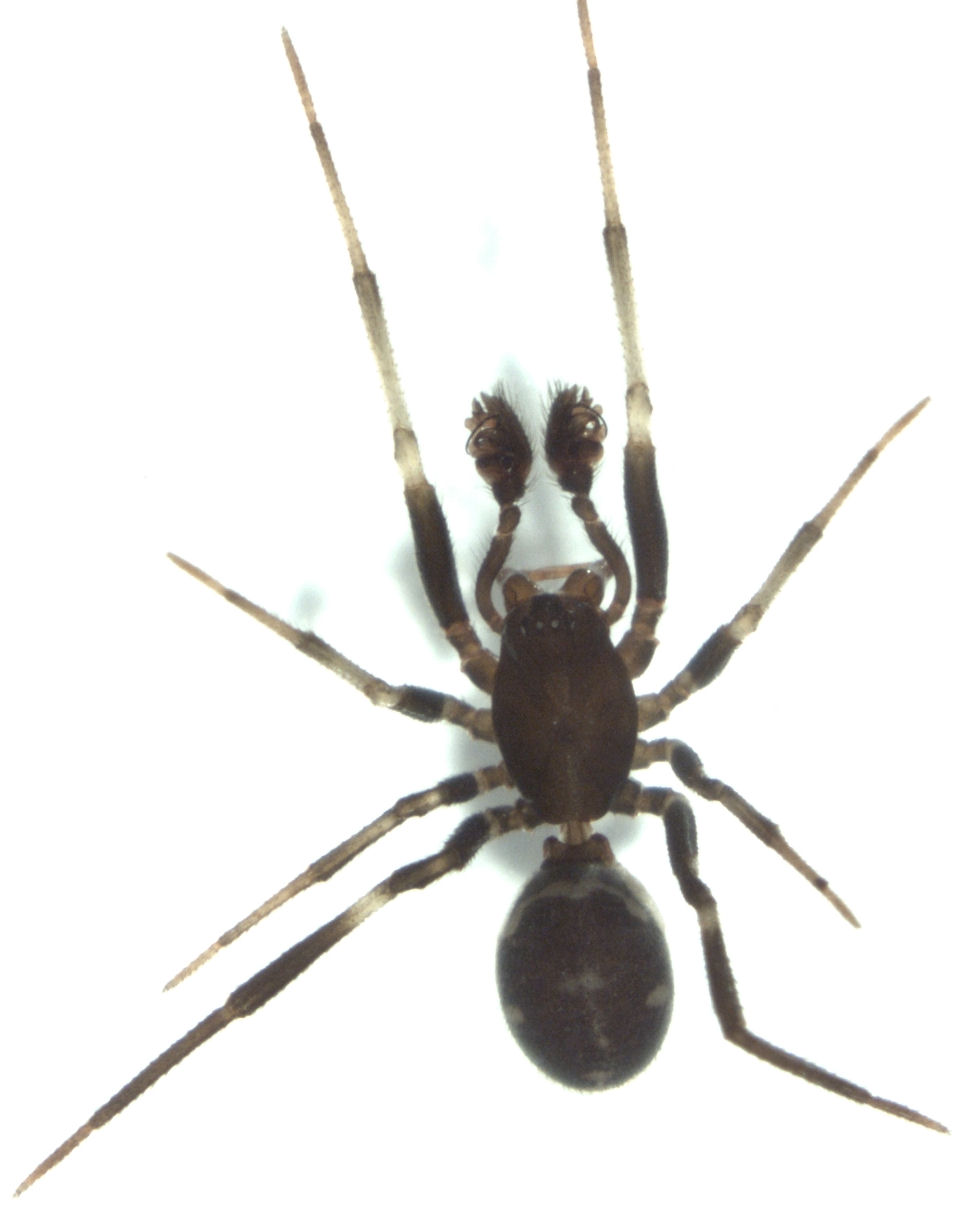
Male Steatoda lepida

== Distribution ==
This species is widespread throughout New Zealand, including on the Chatham Islands.

== Conservation status ==
Under the New Zealand Threat Classification System, this species is listed as "Not Threatened".
