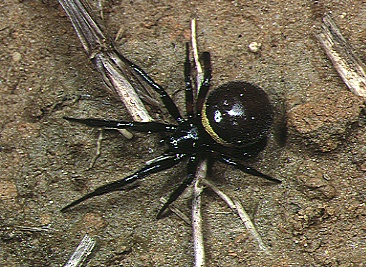
- female from Okinawa, Japan
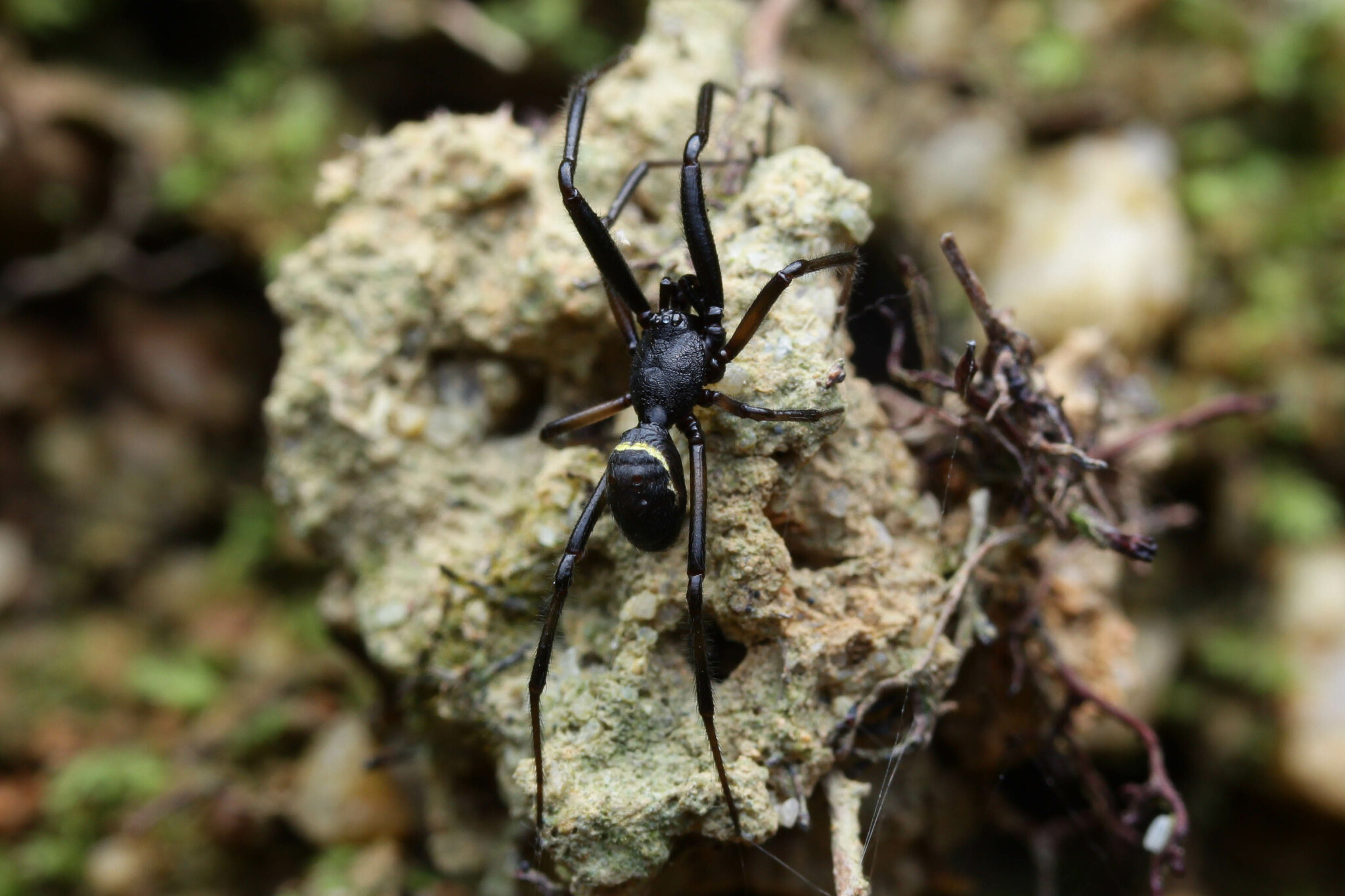
- male from Zhuhai, China

Scientific classification
- Kingdom: Animalia
- Phylum: Arthropoda
- Subphylum: Chelicerata
- Class: Arachnida
- Order: Araneae
- Infraorder: Araneomorphae
- Family: Theridiidae
- Genus: Steatoda
- Species: S. cingulata

Binomial name
- Steatoda cingulata (Thorell, 1890)

Synonyms
- Stethopoma cingulatum Thorell, 1890; Lithyphantes cavernicola Bösenberg & Strand, 1906; Asagena albilunata Saito, 1939; Lithyphantes cavaleriei Schenkel, 1963; Steatoda panja Barrion et al., 2013

= Steatoda cingulata =

Species of spider

Steatoda cingulata is a species of cobweb spider in the family Theridiidae. It is widely distributed across Asia, ranging from India and China to Japan, Korea, and Southeast Asia.

The species name "cingulata" (from Latin cingulum "girdle") refers to the white band seen in both sexes.

== Taxonomy ==
The species was originally described by Tamerlan Thorell in 1890 as Stethopoma cingulatum based on specimens from Java. The species has undergone several taxonomic revisions and has been placed in different genera over time. It was later transferred to the genus Steatoda and is now recognized as S. cingulata.

Several species have been synonymized with S. cingulata, including Lithyphantes cavernicola Bösenberg & Strand, 1906, Asagena albilunata Saito, 1939, and most recently Steatoda panja Barrion et al., 2013.

== Distribution ==
S. cingulata has been recorded from India, China, Korea, Japan, Vietnam, Laos, and Indonesia (Sumatra and Java). The species appears to be widely distributed across temperate and tropical regions of Asia.

== Description ==
Based on Thorell's original description, S. cingulata is a relatively small spider with distinctive coloration. The cephalothorax (front section) and sternum are black, while parts of the body show reddish-brown coloration. The clypeus (area between the eyes and the front edge) and mandibles are lighter, appearing rust-colored to reddish-brown.

The legs are blackish-brown with reddish-brown coloration, particularly on the femora (thigh segments) and other leg segments. The abdomen is black with distinctive white markings that give the species its name ("cingulata" meaning "banded" or "girdled"). Near the base of the abdomen, above the front slope, there is a narrow curved white transverse band that extends about one-third across the lateral width. Additional white markings include transverse lines across the middle of the abdomen and longitudinal white lines toward the rear, sometimes forming T-shaped patterns.

Males measure approximately 3.25–5.25 mm in body length, while females are around 7 mm. The species shows typical sexual dimorphism common in cobweb spiders, with females being larger than males.
