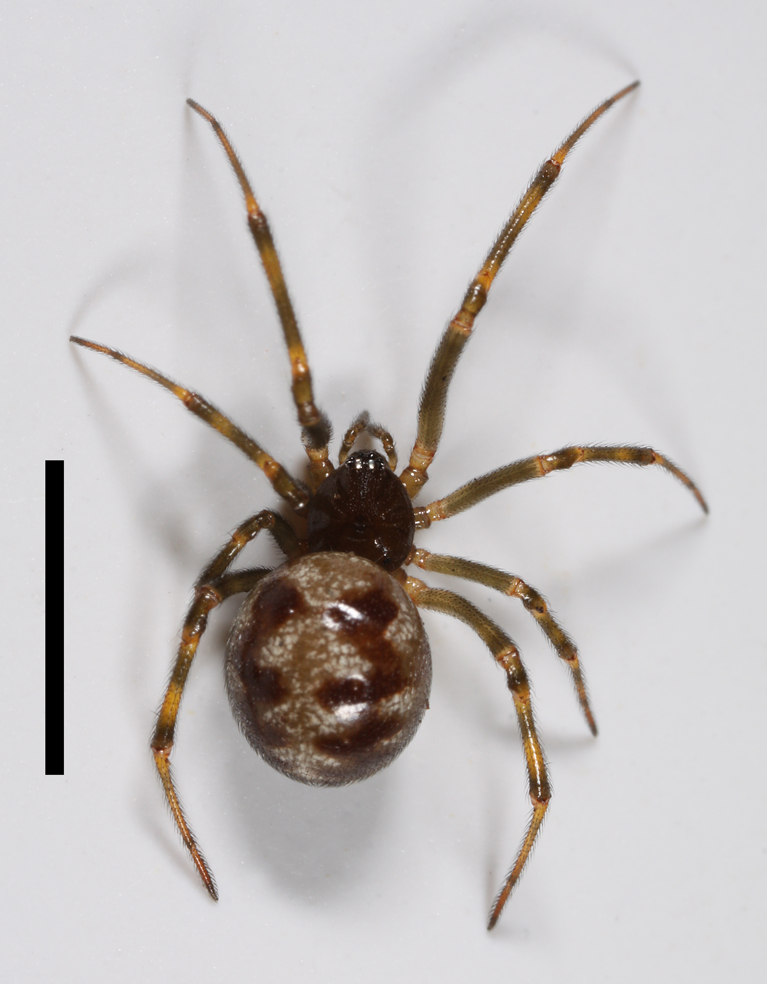

Scientific classification
- Kingdom: Animalia
- Phylum: Arthropoda
- Subphylum: Chelicerata
- Class: Arachnida
- Order: Araneae
- Infraorder: Araneomorphae
- Family: Theridiidae
- Genus: Steatoda
- Species: S. triangulosa

Binomial name
- Steatoda triangulosa (Walckenaer, 1802)

Synonyms
- Aranea triangulosa Walckenaer, 1802; Theridion triangulifer Walckenaer, 1805; Theridium venustissimum C. L. Koch, 1838; Theridion punicum Lucas, 1846; Theridion flavo-maculatum Lucas, 1846; Theridion serpentinum Hentz, 1850; Steatoda venustissima (C. L. Koch, 1838); Steatoda triangulosa (Walckenaer, 1802); Steatoda triangulifera Simon, 1873; Teutana triangulosa (Walckenaer, 1802); Theridion saylori Fox, 1940; Teutana lugubris Schenkel, 1963; Steatoda lugubris (Schenkel, 1963)

= Triangulate cobweb spider =

Species of spider

The triangulate cobweb spider (scientific name: Steatoda triangulosa; also called the triangulate bud spider or checkered cobweb weaver) is a common spider in the genus Steatoda. It is well known for the triangle-shaped pattern on the dorsal side of its abdomen.

== Description ==
The adult female triangulate cobweb spider is 3 to 6 mm long (1/8 to 1/4 inch), with a brownish-orange cephalothorax and spindly, yellowish legs, and tiny hairs. The round, bulbous abdomen is creamy in color, with parallel purply-brown zigzag lines running front to back. This distinctive pattern sets it apart from other theridiids in its area.

The triangulate cobweb spider is known to prey on many other types of arthropods, ants (including fire ants), other spiders, pillbugs, and ticks. It preys on several other spiders believed to be harmful to humans, including the brown recluse. Anything it catches in the web it preys upon.

The egg sac of the triangulated cobweb spider is made from loosely woven silk, and is about the same size as the spider itself. Each egg sac contains approximately 30 eggs. It is speculated, though not proven that they may reproduce via parthenogenesis. Cobweb spiders typically live on windows or in dark areas. They eat for a margin of their day and spend hours developing their web; it does not break if it is woven accordingly to the size of prey. Below or in its web, there may be many dead insects, ranging from stinkbugs to other spiders including Lycosidae, to large Scutigera and even wasps. Of the Steatoda, they are the most voracious and prey-driven despite being one of the smaller species.

== Taxonomy ==
The species was first described, as Aranea triangulosa, by Charles Walckenaer in 1802. It was transferred to the genus Steatoda by Tamerlan Thorell in 1873 (although it had been placed in the genus previously under the synonym Steatoda venustissima).

== Habitat and range ==
Similar to other members of the family Theridiidae, S. triangulosa constructs a cobweb, i.e. an irregular tangle of sticky silken fibers.

Steatoda triangulosa constructs three-dimensional webs in dark places, usually close to the substrate. The species is frequently found under stones.

As with other web-weavers, these spiders have very poor eyesight and depend mostly on vibrations reaching them through their webs to orient themselves to prey or warn them of larger animals that could injure or kill them. They are not very defensive towards humans. There is one known case of human envenomation.

S. triangulosa is a cosmopolitan species. It is native to Eurasia, and has been introduced elsewhere including North America, Argentina, the Canary Islands, and South Africa. This species is primarily a house spider, and builds webs in dark corners of buildings and other man-made structures.

== Conservation ==
Steatoda triangulosa is listed as Least Concern due to its wide geographical range. In South Africa, the species is protected in Tembe Elephant Park.
