= List of dangerous spiders =

A number of spiders can cause spider bites that are medically important. Almost all spiders produce venom but only a few are able to cause significant harm to humans. Two medically important spider genera have a worldwide distribution—Latrodectus and Loxosceles. Others have a limited distribution.

Medical reports have been criticized for poor evidence. In the last century, hobo spiders, white-tailed spiders, and wolf spiders were considered medically significant, only to be recanted. Only ten genera (Atrax, Phoneutria, Loxosceles, Latrodectus, Hadronyche, Gigathele, Missulena, Illawarra, Sicarius, and Hexophthalma) are considered medically significant. Bites of these spiders have a range of severity, with only a minority having severe symptoms. Deaths by verified spider bites are exceedingly rare (e.g. not one in Australia since 1979).

== Brazilian wandering spiders ==
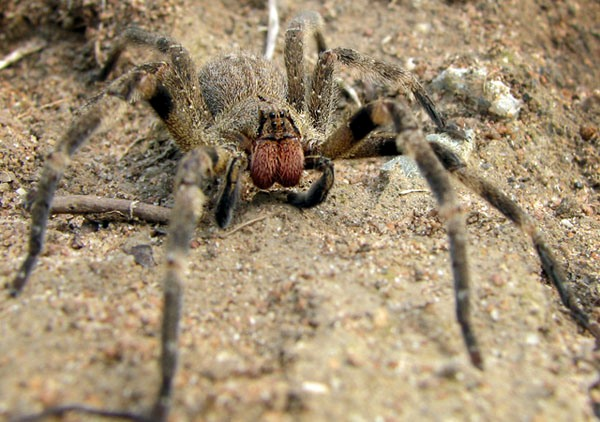
Brazilian wandering spider (Phoneutria nigriventer)

Phoneutria nigriventer, the Brazilian wandering spider (a ctenid spider), is a large brown spider similar to North American wolf spiders in appearance, although somewhat larger. It has a highly toxic venom and is regarded (along with the Australian funnel-web spiders) as among the most dangerous spiders in the world. Based on one of the few pharmacological studies performed in the 1970s, Phoneutria's venom toxicity was more virulent than both Atrax and Latrodectus.

As their name suggests, Brazilian wandering spiders are active ground hunters. If the spider has a reason to be alarmed, it will bite in order to protect itself, but unless startled or provoked, most bites will be without venom. Venom bites will normally occur if the spider is pressed against something and hurt.

Children are more sensitive to the venom of wandering spiders. The spiders often make threatening gestures, such as raising up their legs, or hopping sideways on the ground, which might amuse a child to the point of reaching towards the spider. In humans, bites of this spider may also result in prolonged painful penile erections (priapism). Scientists are attempting to create an erectile dysfunction treatment that can be combined with other medicines out of the peptide that causes this reaction.

== Australian funnel-web spiders ==
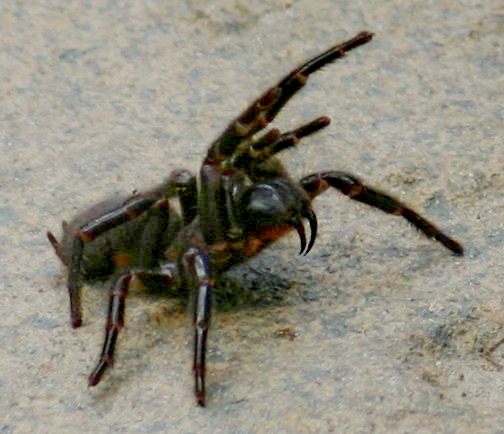
Threat display by a Sydney funnel-web spider (Atrax robustus)

The Australian funnel-web spiders (family Atracidae), such as the Sydney funnel-web spider Atrax robustus (a mygalomorph spider, not to be confused with the araneomorph funnel-weaver or grass spiders), are regarded as among the most dangerous in the world. They react vigorously to threats and, reputedly, will more often attempt to bite than run away. A. robustus, a large black spider, is found within a radius of about 100 km from Sydney. Its venom contains a compound known as δ-atracotoxin which is highly toxic to primates. Approximately 10% of bites lead to serious symptoms for a total of 3–4 severe envenomations annually.

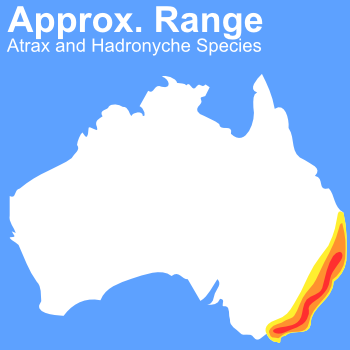
Range of the two genera (Hadronyche and Atrax) of venomous Australian funnel-web spiders

A. robustus is one of five designated species of the genus Atrax (the others being A. christenseni, A. montanus, A. yorkmainorum, and A. sutherlandii). The related genus Hadronyche is represented by 32 other dangerous species in eastern Australia, including Queensland and Tasmania. The males in this case have somewhat more potent venom than females and they also wander, making them more likely to be encountered in summer. Bites by males of two large species, the Sydney funnel-web and northern tree funnel-web, have resulted in death. One specific case denoted an individual being bitten through the heel of his leather footwear after provoking the spider, indicating the great strength of the spider's chelicerae.

One other genus in the family Macrothelidae has been reported to cause severe symptoms in humans. Severe bites have been attributed to members of the genus Gigathele (formerly classified as Macrothele) in Taiwan, but no fatalities. In other mammals, such as rodents, for example, the effects of funnel web spider venom are much less severe.

== Tangle-web spiders ==
One genus of the tangle web spiders has venom which is known to be medically significant. This genus, the widow spiders of genus Latrodectus, has caused human fatalities. The other genus, Steatoda, the false widow spiders, have bites that can cause pain and erythema but only around 30% of bites lead to systemic symptoms.

=== Widow spiders ===
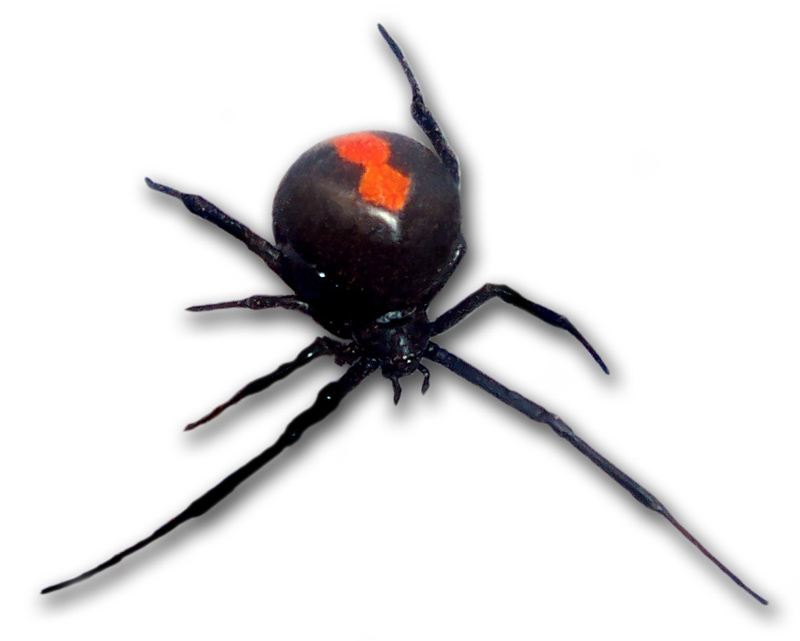
Latrodectus hasselti, the redback spider

The widow spiders (genus Latrodectus), such as the black widow, redback spider, and katipō are spiders that carry a neurotoxic venom which can cause a set of symptoms known as latrodectism.

Widow spiders are large, shiny house spiders with relatively spindly legs and deep, globular abdomens. Mature females have dark and shiny abdomens with one or several red spots, either above and/or below. The spots may take the form of an hourglass, or two triangles, point-to-point. They seldom leave their webs, but if they have to, they can run fast over short distances. Male widows and immature females may have a variety of streaks and spots on a browner, less globular abdomen. The males are generally too small to be dangerous. Widows tend to be non-aggressive. Some species, especially those in North America, have no spot on their backs, with the hourglass becoming visible only when the spider hangs upside-down, and can thus be mistaken for their less dangerous cousins, which is especially true in males.

The Australian red-back and North American widow species live near humans and bites are frequent, numbering thousands yearly. The venom produces very painful effects including muscle spasms, 'tetanus-like' contractions, nausea and vomiting, and severe generalized pain. A serious bite will often require a short hospital stay to control pain. Children may be less sensitive to severe effects of redback venom. Still, children as well as elderly and ill individuals are advised to seek medical attention. Fatalities were reported as high as 10% of cases in the early-20th century but deaths have not been reported in the United States for decades and only 0.5% of those bitten have had major medical complications. The last record of a red-back fatality in Australia was in 1955.

=== False black widows ===
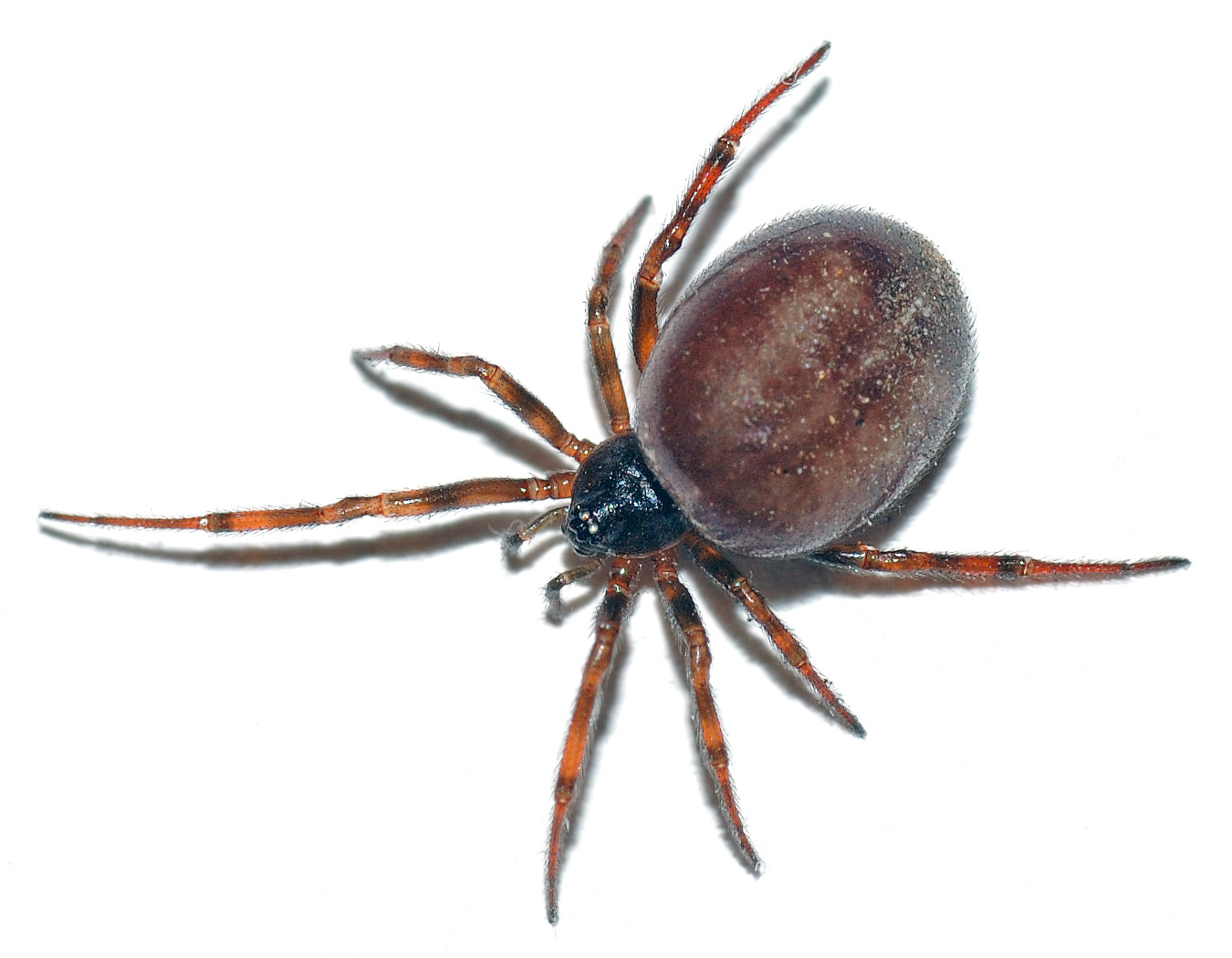
Steatoda bipunctata

The false black widow spiders (also known as false katipo, false button spider, cupboard spider, and in Australia, brown house spider) are spiders of the genus Steatoda. They resemble widow spiders in size and physical form, due to being members of the same family. While the bite of Steatoda spiders are never as serious as can be for true widow spiders, several have been often reported to give general symptoms away from the bite site, indicating the action of venom. The bite of Steatoda grossa may cause nausea, widespread but short lived intense pain, muscle spasms, fatigue, necrotizing or infected wound sites and malaise; the medical community now refers to the symptoms of Steatoda bites as steatodism. Other spiders in this genus with potentially medically significant venom include two chiefly European varieties, S. paykulliana and S. nobilis, and a species found mainly in New Zealand and South Africa, S. capensis.

Use of widow spider antivenom has been shown effective in treating steatodism. The genera Steatoda and Latrodectus are biologically close relatives; both belonging to the same family Theridiidae. There are over 100 species in this genus Steatoda, but only some species have been associated with symptomatic bites, and many alleged reports have not been confirmed as actual bites (actual bite event not seen, etc.) nor can be directly attributed to certain species (no specimen collected and examined by an arachnologist, etc.).

Members of this genus are characterized by the "D" shape of the cephalothorax, and the way the relatively straight line thus formed is mirrored by the blunt forward surface of the abdomen. Other genera in this family generally have cephalothoraxes that are more oval in shape or even rather round, and that give the appearance of two body parts that are joined by a small connector.

== Sicariidae spiders ==
The family Sicariidae includes three genera which can potentially inflict cytotoxic bites. One genus, Loxosceles, comprises the recluse spiders (below). The other genera, Sicarius and Hexophthalma, are found only in the southern hemisphere, an example being Hexophthalma hahni and Sicarius ornatus.

=== Recluse spiders ===
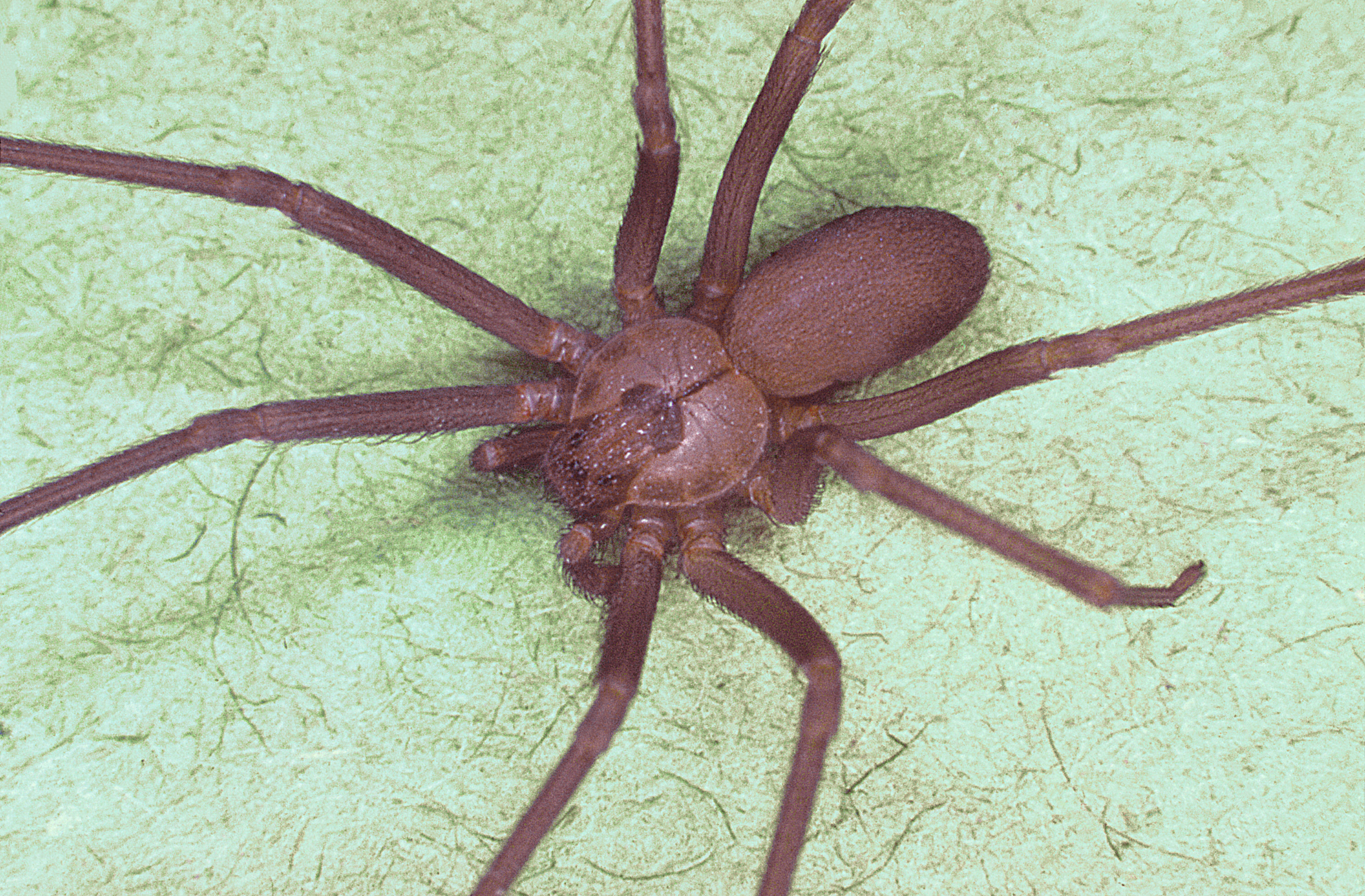
Brown recluse. Note the darker brown "fiddle head" on the cephalothorax (center of the image).

Recluse spiders (Loxosceles spp.), such as the brown recluse spider, also known as "violin spiders", "fiddlers", or "fiddlebacks", from the dark violin-shaped marking on the cephalothorax, are retiring spiders which wander about in dim areas and under things. Large populations can infest a house without any bites reported. Due to small fangs, bites happen when trapped against one's skin by clothing, bed sheets, etc. Most encounters with this spider occur from moving boxes or rooting about in closets or under beds. The range of the brown recluse, L. reclusa in the U.S. is limited to the central and southern states. A number of related recluse spiders (some non-native introductions) are found in the western deserts. Reports of recluse bites far outnumber the number of spiders found in much of the U.S. For example, many brown recluse bites have been reported in the U.S. west coast states (Washington, Oregon, and northern California) where populations of brown recluse spiders have not been found.

Most recluse spider bites are minor with a small area of redness. However, a small number of bites produce severe dermonecrotic lesions, and, sometimes, severe systemic reaction known as hemolytic anemia. Brown recluse bites have been suspected in several fatalities.

A minority of bites form a necrotizing ulcer that destroys soft tissue and may take months and, on very rare occasions, years to heal, leaving deep scars. The damaged tissue will become black and eventually slough away. Bites occur commonly during dressing as spiders are trapped in the sleeve or pant leg. Bites usually become painful and itchy within 2 to 8 hours, pain and other local effects worsen 12 to 36 hours after the bite with the necrosis developing over the next few days. Around the face, swelling is common.

Serious systemic effects known as visceral loxoscelism may occur before this time, as the venom spreads throughout the body. Moderate symptoms include nausea, vomiting, fever, rashes, and muscle and joint pain. Rarely more severe symptoms occur including hemolysis, thrombocytopenia, and disseminated intravascular coagulation. Debilitated patients, the elderly, and children may be more susceptible to systemic loxoscelism. Hemolysis may require transfusion and could lead to kidney failure. Deaths have been reported from suspected brown recluse envenomation.

The Chilean recluse, a species native to South America have been known to cause systemic visceral loxoscelism in 15% of reported cases, and fatalities in 3‒4% of cases.

=== Six-eyed sand spiders ===
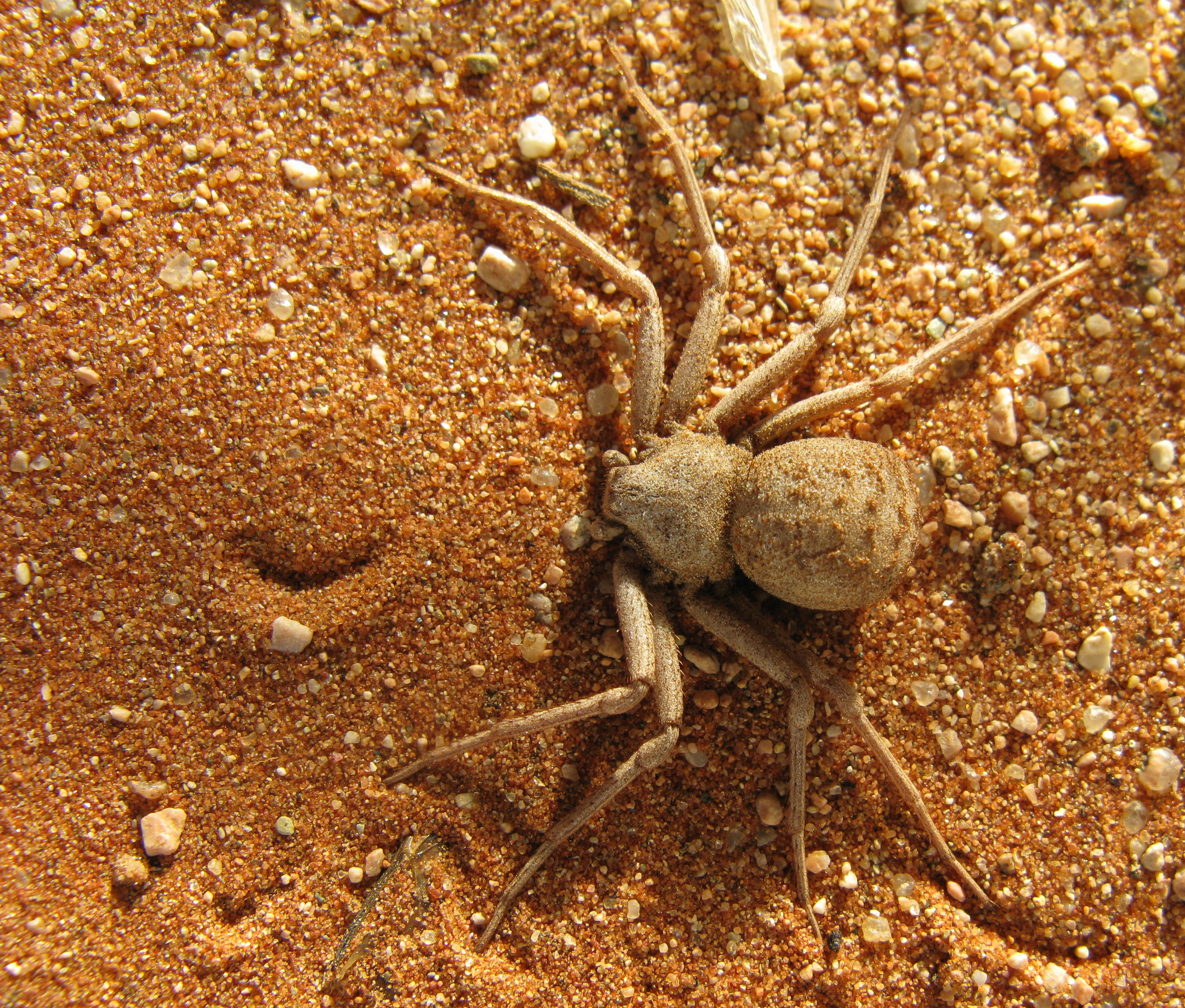
Mature female Hexophthalma sp. from coastal Namibia.

The six-eyed sand spiders of southern Africa in the genus Hexophthalma and Sicarius from South America inject a cytotoxic venom, that contains sphingomyelinase D, for which there is currently no antivenom. Fortunately, this specimen rarely interacts with humans, and is seldom known to bite. This spider buries itself in sand in order to ambush prey that wanders nearby. Sand particles adhere to cuticles on its abdomen, thus acting as a natural camouflage if uncovered.

== Mouse spiders ==
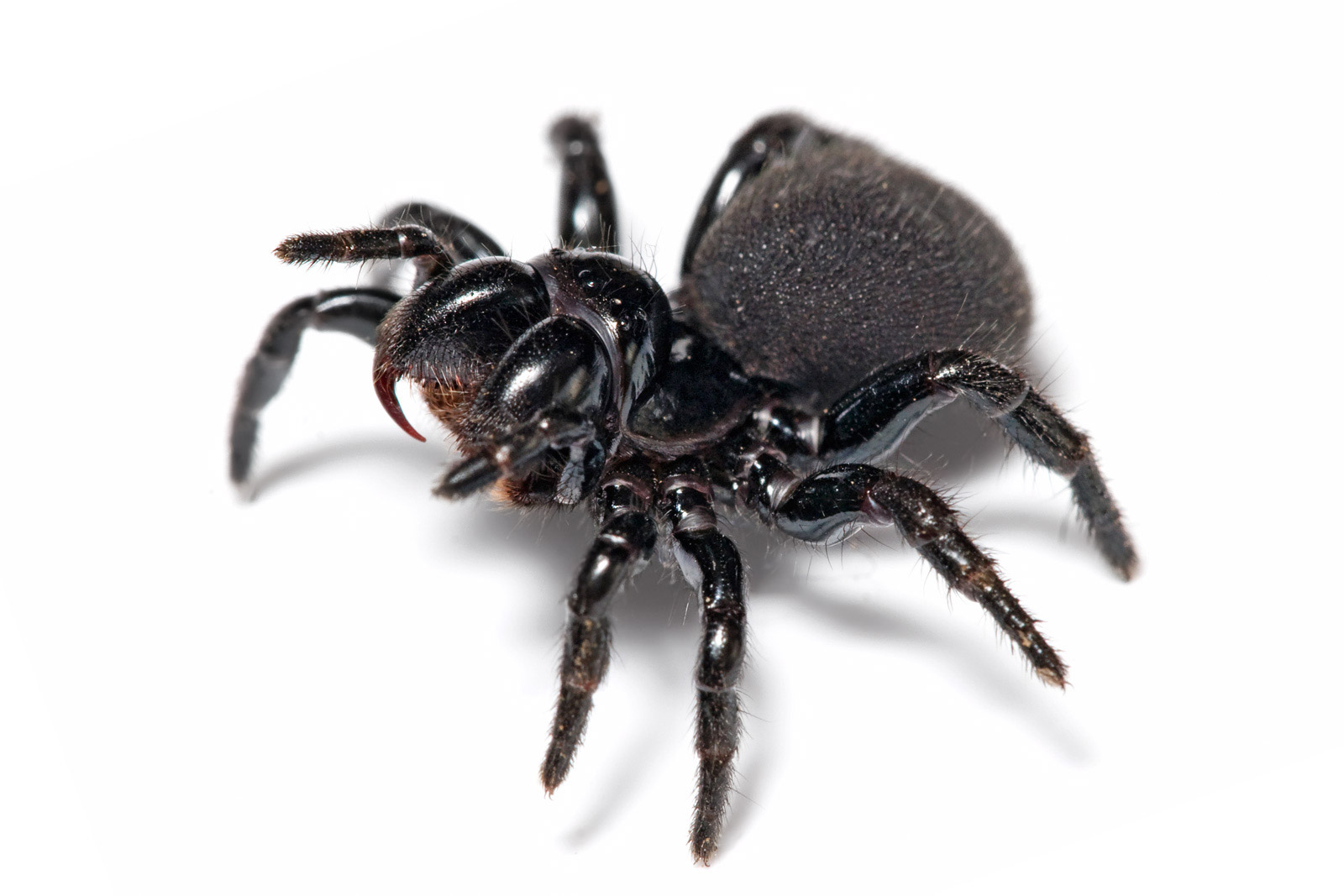
Mouse spider

The mouse spiders of the genus Missulena are a type of primitive burrowing spider found primarily in Australia and Chile in South America. Several species of this genus are known to possess a venom which contains compounds similar to δ-atracotoxin, the substance in funnel-web venom which can be fatal. However, most bite victims suffer only local pain and bleeding, a few more have limited neurotoxic symptoms (tingling, racing heart, more widespread pain), and there have been several recorded bites by this spider producing severe symptoms requiring medical treatment. There are no recorded human fatalities due to mouse spider bites. When severe envenomation does occur, funnel-web antivenom has been shown to be effective.

== Tarantulas ==
The tarantulas of the family Theraphosidae are fearsome-looking spiders and a favorite of movies and television. The fangs deliver a weak venom and simultaneously crush the insect. The Sydney funnel-web spider is a relative with a much more potent neurotoxic venom. Trapdoor spiders, many of which resemble tarantulas but are shinier and less hairy, also have large fangs that deliver painful bites, but have very mild venom.

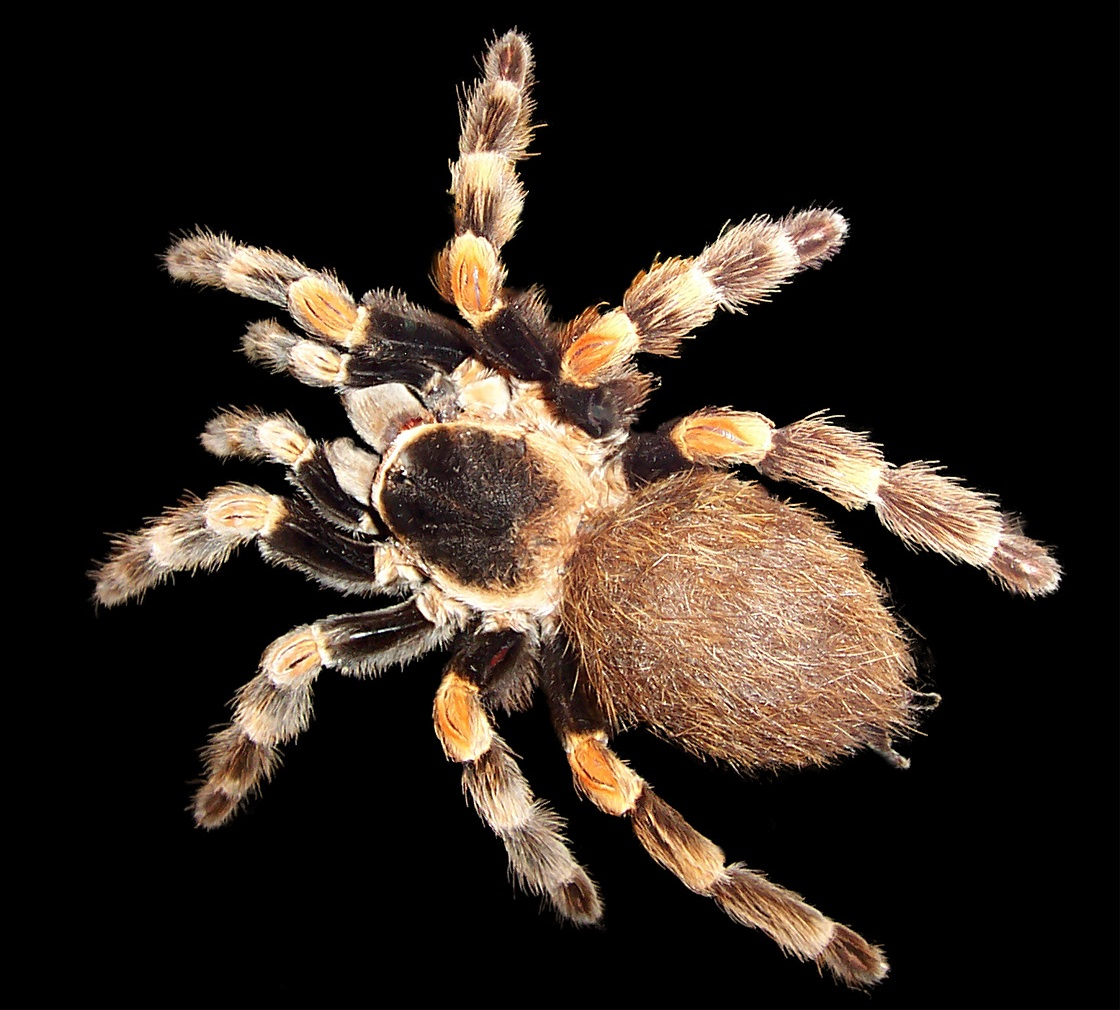
Mexican Red Knee tarantula (Brachypelma sp.), a new-world species

=== New-world tarantulas ===
New-world tarantulas—those indigenous to the Americas—have bites that generally pose little threat to humans (other than causing localized pain). The primary defense deployed by these spiders is by means of urticating hairs, which can cause irritant symptoms in humans.

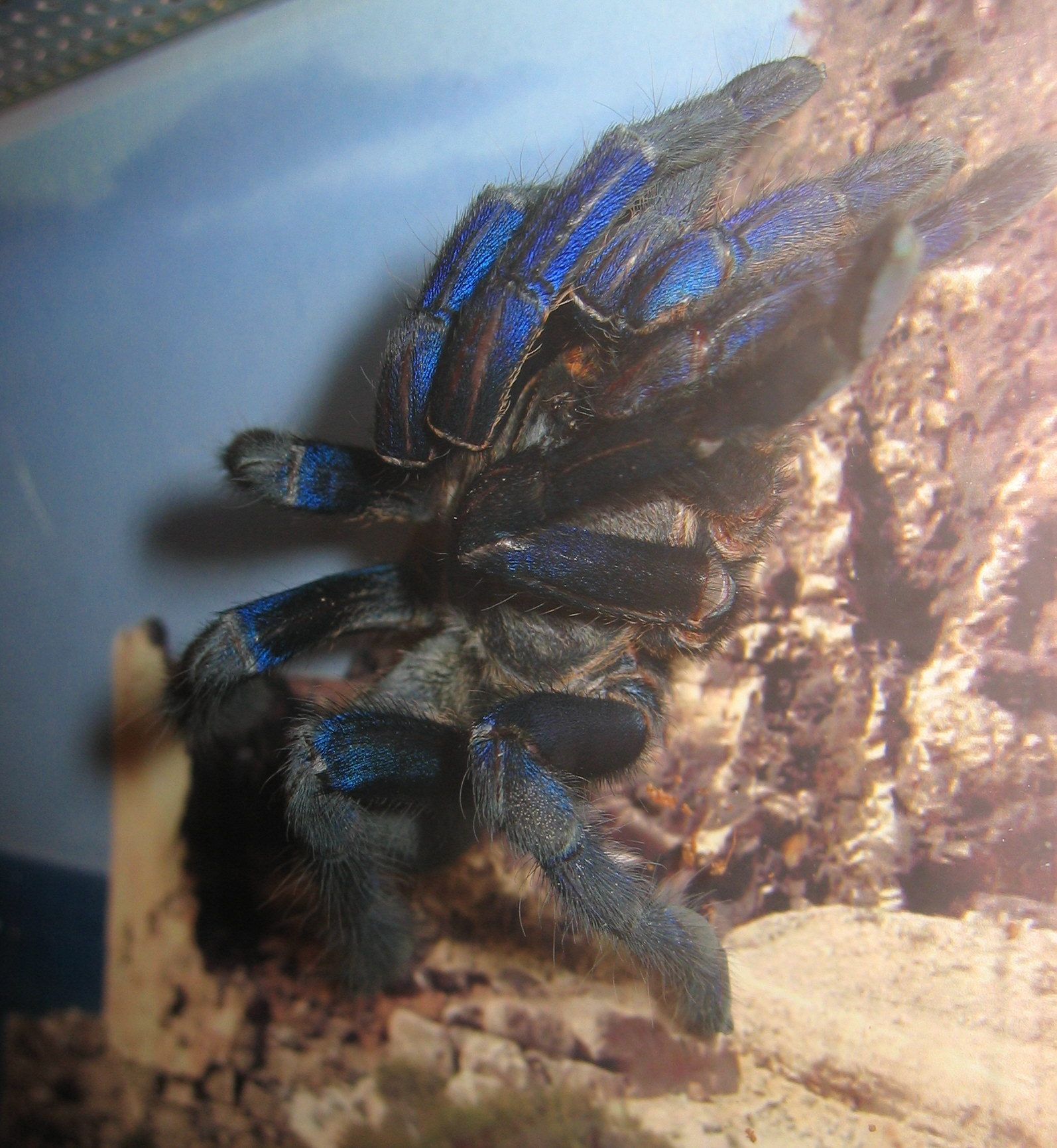
Cobalt blue tarantula (Haplopelma lividum), an old-world species

=== Old-world tarantulas ===
Old-world tarantulas, especially those indigenous to Asia, lack urticating hairs and may bite as a defensive mechanism. They are far less docile than new-world tarantulas, and are more likely to bite when provoked.

Hobbyists report bites by Poecilotheria species, occasionally resulting in hospitalization. Symptoms include localized pain and swelling, exhaustion, moderate to severe muscle cramping, labored breathing and fever, sometimes delayed days after the initial bite. Medical documentation is lacking. Pterinochilus murinus, Lampropelma nigerrimum, and members of the genera Stromatopelma, Heteroscodra, and Selenocosmia are other old world tarantulas that are noted for possessing particularly strong venom which tends to cause severe muscle spasms.

Venom of the Australian tarantulas Selenocosmia spp. and Phlogiellus spp. is particularly toxic to canines, with bites to dogs producing a high fatality rate.

== Myths ==
There are several species of spider (and related arachnids) which have had false historical reputations for being harmful to humans.

=== Hobo spiders ===
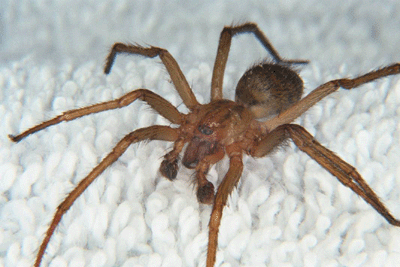
Male hobo spider ‒ note the large pedipalps

The hobo spider, Eratigena agrestis, may wander away from its web, especially in the fall, and thus come into contact with people. The Centers for Disease Control blamed the hobo spider in three reports of necrotic "bites" in the Pacific Northwest of the United States between 1988 and 1996. Studies performed by arachnologist Darwin Vest reported that this spider's venom caused significant necrotic effects in laboratory animals. Many agricultural authorities have published the advice that this species is potentially harmful, and medical personnel in the western United States and Canada have been advised to consider hobo spider bites when patients present with necrotic wounds.

However, in Europe, where the spider originates, the species is considered a harmless outdoor relative of the giant house spider (Eratigena atrica), and no other spider in the genus Eratigena is considered to be harmful to people. Attempts to replicate Vest's study that reported necrotic effects of the venom have failed, thus casting the "dangerous" status of this spider into doubt. In addition, Vest's methodologies have been questioned; he has been accused of incorrectly attributing symptoms to hobo spider bites when no positive identification of the spider was made. The one fatality attributed to the spider by medical authorities has also been questioned, and there are no documented cases where an otherwise-healthy person has developed a necrotic lesion from a positively identified hobo spider bite.

=== Lycosa tarantula ===
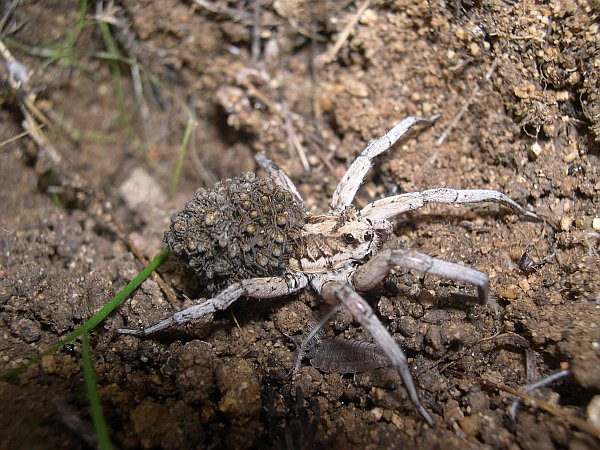
Lycosa tarantula. Its back is covered with recently hatched spiderlings.

Lycosa tarantula, a species of wolf spider which is found near Taranto, Italy, Serbia, Montenegro (and the origin of the name tarantula, which today refers to a completely different kind of spider), was once blamed for a condition known as tarantism. A bitten young woman would be forced to dance wildly in the central plaza—the tarantella. Cultural interpretations report sexuality as an important aspect of the "spider bite". Originally thought to be mass hysteria, some scholars point to a culturally accepted means of exhibitionism. History of medicine believe the confusion came from workers in the fields would suffer bites, and observe large, conspicuous, hairy spiders in the area. That spider, L. tarantula, was blamed for the pain and suffering (and occasional death) associated with tarantism. It is known that the bite of L. tarantula, while sometimes painful, has no serious medical consequences for humans. It is also suspected that the real culprit was another spider, Latrodectus tredecimguttatus, the European widow spider, which causes latrodectism. A similar mass hysteria surrounds purported brown recluse bites. Lycosa raptoria of South America has been reported to have caused a painful bite followed by intense tissue swelling and in some cases either mild systemic effects or a necrotic lesion. Subsequent investigation removed the species from suspicion.

=== White-tailed spiders ===
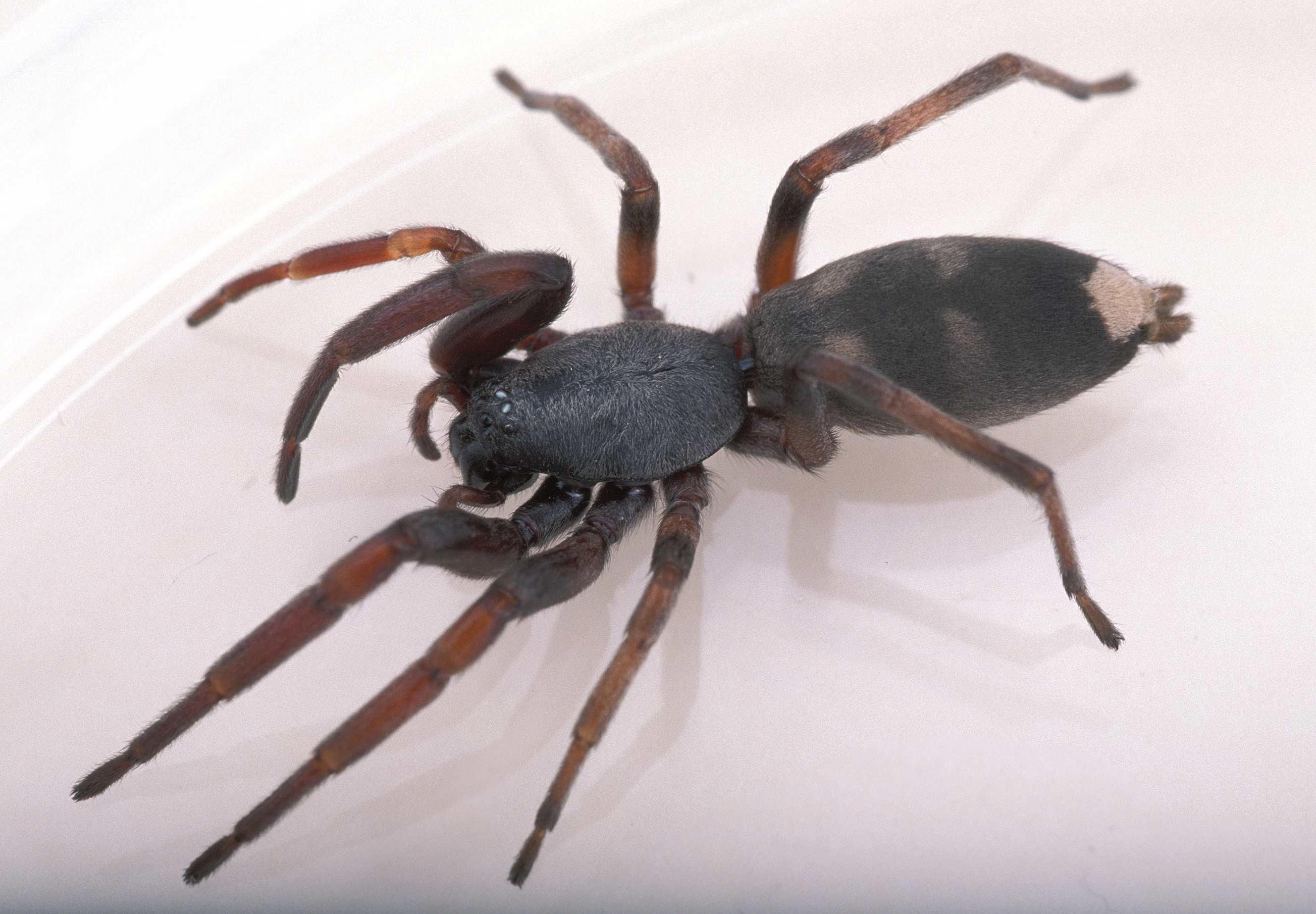
Lampona cylindrata, one of two species of Lampona commonly referred to as white-tailed spiders.

White-tailed spiders (Lampona spp.), indigenous to Australia and introduced to New Zealand, have been blamed for a necrotic bite, producing symptoms similar to a brown recluse. The white-tailed spider (Lampona) was implicated for decades in necrotic lesions, but has been exonerated. A study of 130 white-tailed spider bites found no necrotic ulcers or confirmed infections; only a red mark, local swelling, and itchiness. Very occasionally nausea, vomiting, malaise or headache may occur.

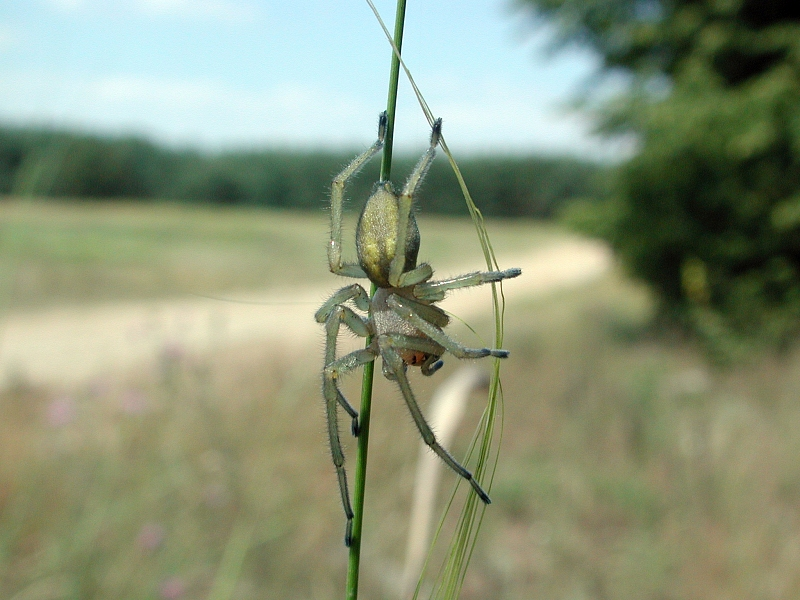
Yellow Sac spider Cheiracanthium punctorium

=== Yellow sac spider ===
A study published in 1970 reported that necrotic skin lesions seen in 5 patients were "probably" caused by bites from Cheiracanthium mildei, despite the fact that none of the patients actually saw a spider bite them. This study was cited by numerous other papers and led to the widespread belief that yellow sac spiders (Cheiracanthium sp.) are dangerous to humans. New analyses of numerous verified bites demonstrate no skin lesions but some local pain and redness.

=== Harvestman ===
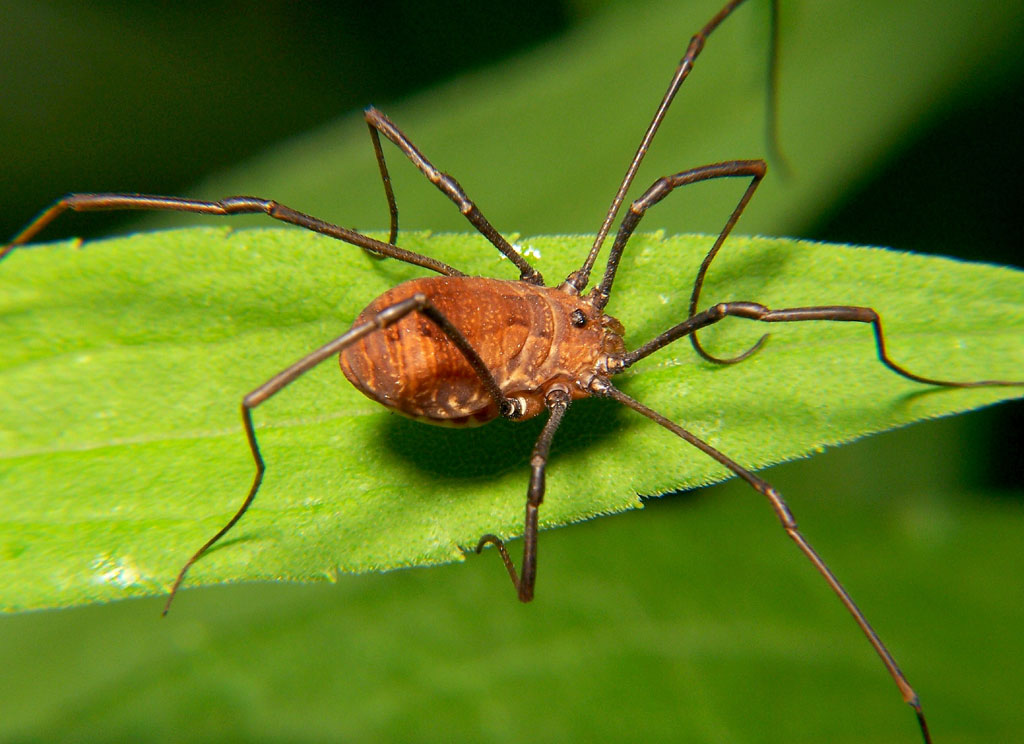
Opiliones (harvestman)

The spider-like arachnids known as Opiliones (also known as "harvestmen" or "daddy-long-legs") are a species often handled by humans. They are the subject of an urban legend which not only claims that harvestmen are venomous, but are in fact more venomous than any other spider though are incapable of biting humans due to their lack of penetration. This is false on several counts. None of the known species have venom glands or chelicerae bearing fangs, instead having smaller, pincer-like chelicerae that cannot usually penetrate human skin. In addition, incidents of opiliones biting people are rare, and no reported bites by these species have had any lasting effects.

The term "daddy-long-legs" also can refer to the similar-looking cellar spider. This species (a true spider) can bite humans, but its venom is not known to have any effects beyond mild discomfort at the site of the bite.

=== Camel spiders ===
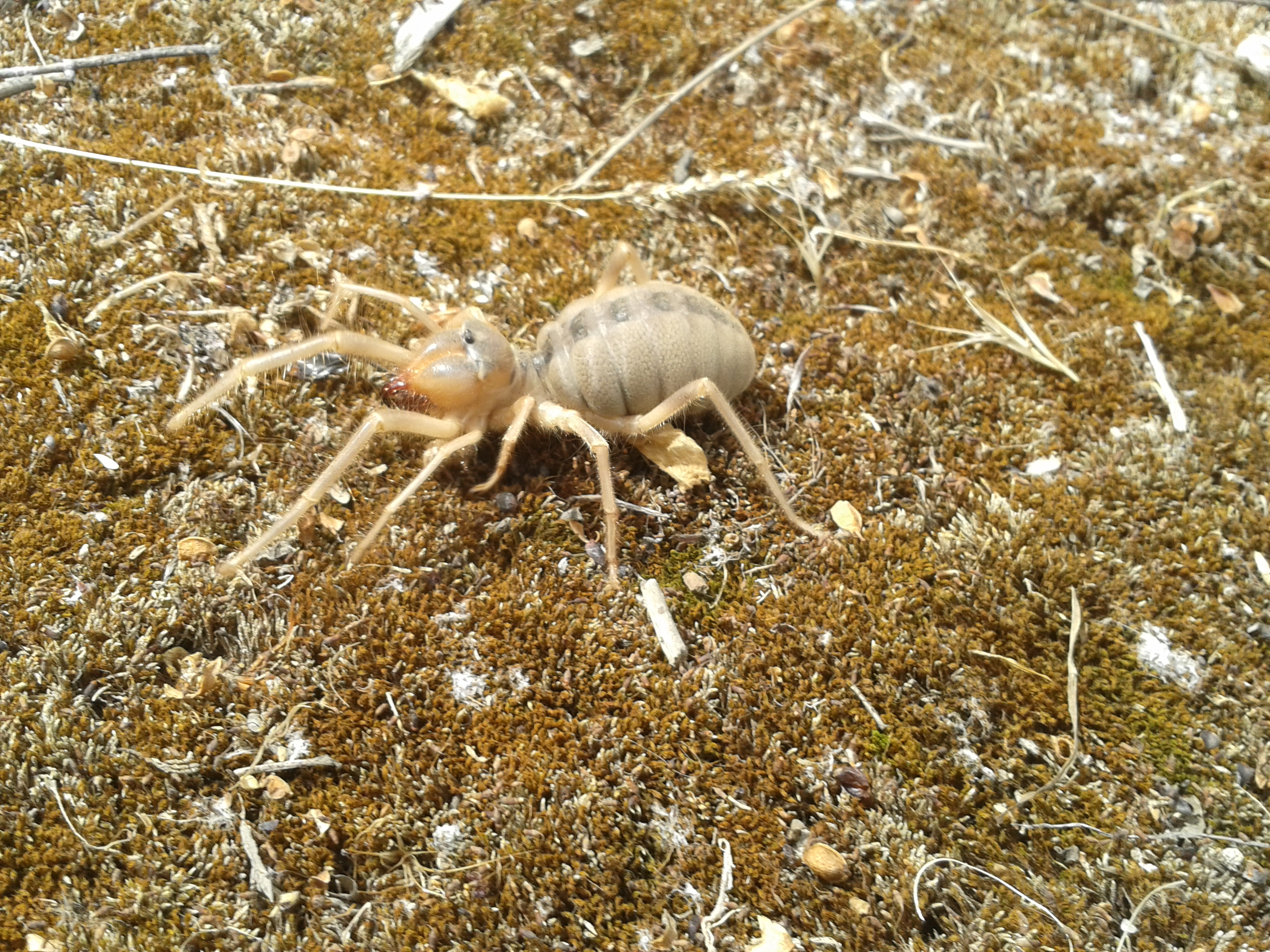
Solpuga sp., a Solifuge

The arachnids of the order Solifugae, also known as wind scorpions, camel or sun spiders, are neither spiders nor scorpions. In the Middle East, it is common belief among some American soldiers stationed there that Solifugae will feed on living human flesh. The urban myth claims that the creature will inject some anesthetizing venom into the exposed skin of its sleeping victim, then feed voraciously, leaving the victim to awaken with a gaping wound. Solifugae, however, do not produce such an anesthetic, and do not attack prey larger than themselves unless threatened.

Further, Solifugae are known to not possess any venom (other than one species in India, which may possess venom according to one study). However, due to the large size of their jaws, bites by Solifugae can cause significant wounds, which should be treated accordingly to avoid infection.
