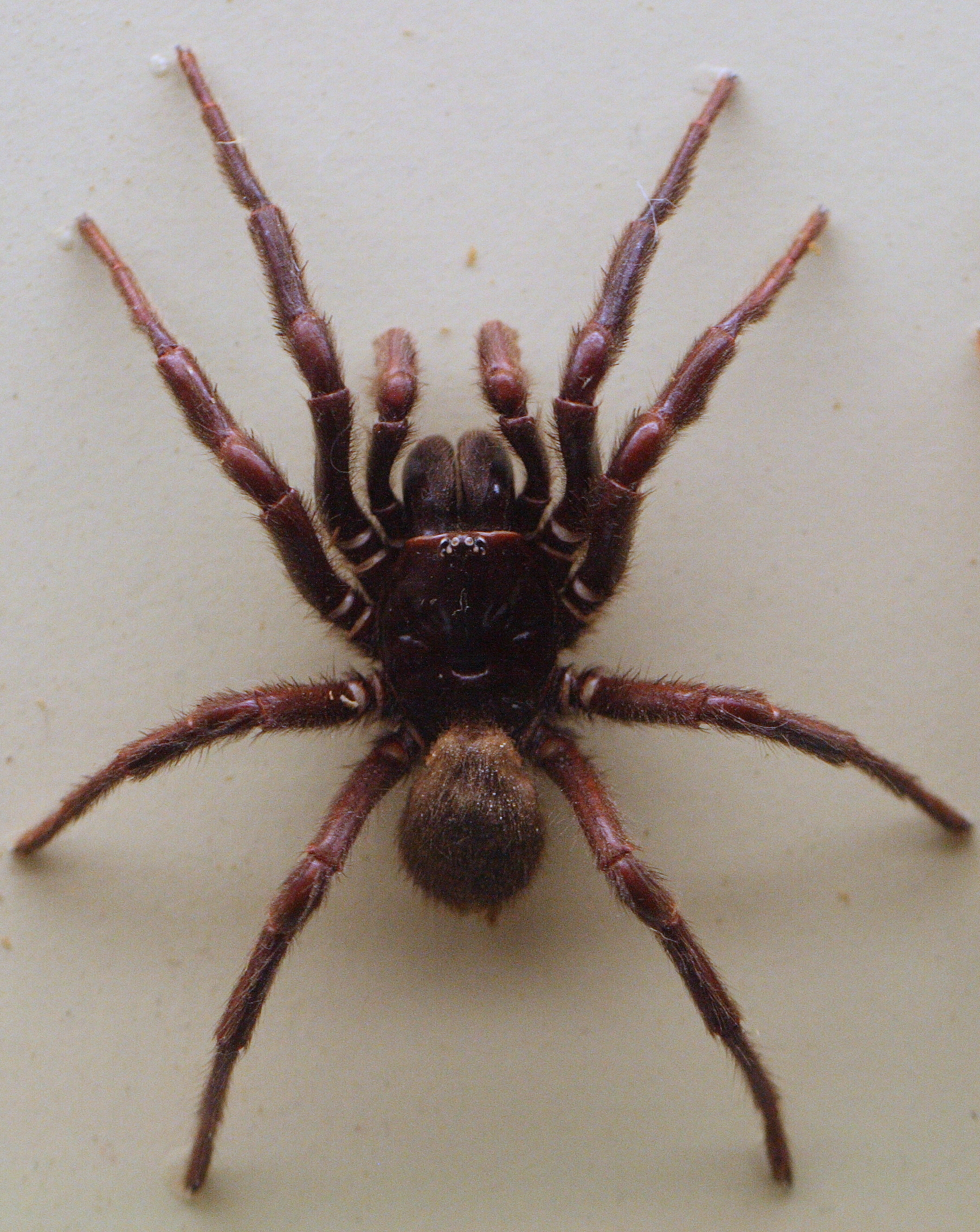
- male specimen on display in the Australian Museum
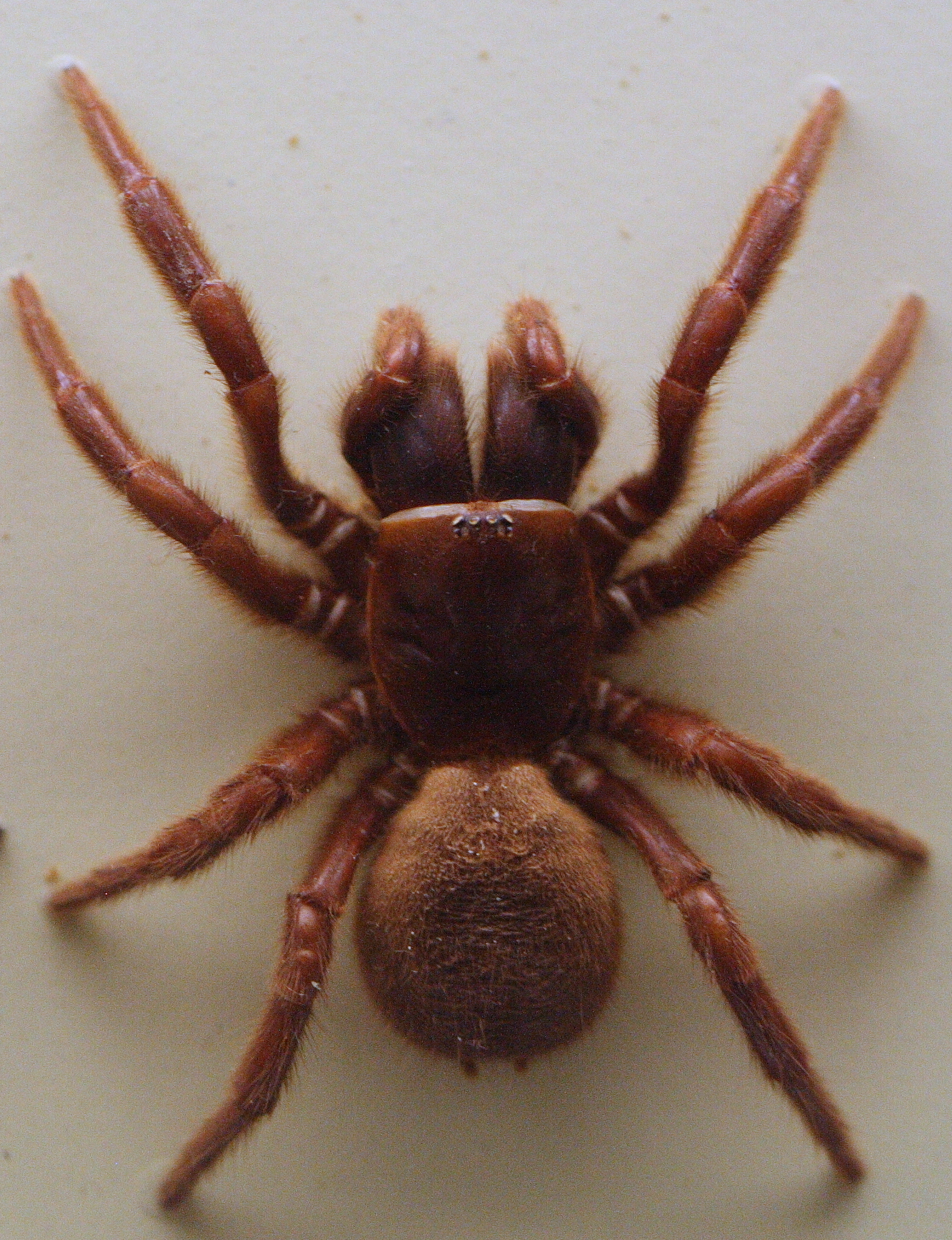
- female specimen on display in the Australian Museum

Scientific classification
- Kingdom: Animalia
- Phylum: Arthropoda
- Subphylum: Chelicerata
- Class: Arachnida
- Order: Araneae
- Infraorder: Mygalomorphae
- Family: Atracidae
- Genus: Hadronyche
- Species: H. formidabilis

Binomial name
- Hadronyche formidabilis (Rainbow, 1914)

Synonyms
- Atrax formidabilis Rainbow

= Hadronyche formidabilis =

Species of spider

Hadronyche formidabilis, the northern tree-dwelling funnel-web spider, is a medically significant mygalomorph spider found in Queensland and New South Wales. It is also known as the Northern Rivers funnel-web spider or northern funnel-web spider.

== Taxonomy ==
A member of the genus Hadronyche, the northern tree-dwelling funnel-web spider was first described in 1914, by William Joseph Rainbow in the genus Atrax, having been collected from the vicinity of the Richmond River. Rainbow suspected it may have needed to be placed in a genus separate to Atrax at the time, but demurred due to the lack of male specimens. The species name is derived from the Latin formidabilis "terrifying". Within the genus Hadronyche, it is classified in the heterogeneous cerberea group, alongside the southern tree-dwelling funnel-web (H. cerberea), the Blue Mountains funnel-web (H. versuta) and 12 other species from southern New South Wales and Victoria.

== Description ==
The northern tree-dwelling funnel-web spider has a glossy black carapace, and matte black or dark brown chelicerae, legs and abdomen. The dorsolateral surface of the abdomen may have a plum- or purplish tinge. The carapace of both sexes is longer and thinner than other members of the genus Hadronyche. With a body length of 40-50 millimetres, it is the largest member of the funnel-web subfamily Atracinae. The species is very similar to the ground-dwelling Darling Downs funnel-web spider (Hadronyche infensa); the male northern tree-dwelling funnel-web spider distinguished by its knobby spur on the tibia of the second pair of legs, which the male Darling Downs funnel-web spider lacks. Trapdoor spiders are more brown overall in colour.

Male and female northern tree-dwelling funnel-web spiders rear up and display their fangs when confronted, drops of venom appearing on the ends of their fangs. They are unable to jump. The venom of the species is potentially deadly to humans, and regarded as the most toxic of those in the family Atracidae. A high proportion of bites—five out of eight recorded cases—from the northern tree-dwelling funnel-web spider result in severe symptoms of envenomation. The venom can be successfully treated with the antivenom for the related Sydney funnel-web spider (Atrax robustus).

Symptoms of envenomation can occur within 15 to 20 minutes. Applying pressure bandages and immobilising the patient can significantly delay the onset of symptoms and remains a critical part of the management of an Australian funnel-web spider bite. Despite the venom lacking the δ-atracotoxin or atraxin of A. robustus, the symptoms are very similar to those from a Sydney funnel-web spider bite. Common symptoms include diaphoresis, hypertension, sinus tachycardia, muscle spasm or fasciculation, nausea and vomiting, altered consciousness and local pain at the bite site. Pulmonary oedema occurs frequently and comes on early. As these spiders are larger than the Sydney funnel-web spider, it may be that they inject greater amounts of venom, making the northern tree-dwelling funnel-web spider possibly the deadliest venomous spider species in the world per volume.

== Distribution and habitat ==
The northern tree-dwelling funnel-web spider is found in eastern Australia from South East Queensland to the Hunter River in New South Wales. This and the southern tree-dwelling funnel-web spider (Hadronyche cerberea) are the only two species of Australian funnel-web spiders that live predominantly in trees. It lives in rotting logs, branches and hollow furrows and pipes of trees, particularly tallowwood (Eucalyptus microcorys), as well as in epiphytes. They have been recorded in trees 30 m (100 ft) above the ground. Roving males are encountered after rain and at night between late October and early February. They seek shelter during the day.

== Ecology ==
The arboreal habitat suggests that wood-boring beetles are a main prey item of the northern tree-dwelling funnel-web spider.
