= Atrax yorkmainorum =

Scientific classification
- Kingdom: Animalia
- Phylum: Arthropoda
- Subphylum: Chelicerata
- Class: Arachnida
- Order: Araneae
- Infraorder: Mygalomorphae
- Family: Atracidae
- Genus: Atrax
- Species: A. yorkmainorum

Binomial name
- Atrax yorkmainorum Gray, 2010

Species of spider

Atrax yorkmainorum is a venomous species of Australian funnel-web spider belonging to the Atracidae family and is found in forests in the vicinity of Canberra and south-eastern New South Wales. The genus Atrax was first documented in 1877 and the Atrax yorkmainorum species was first described in 2010.

The adult male and female have a similar appearance, with the female being slightly larger. Females generally have a body length of 18.84mm whilst the male has an average body length between 16-17mm. Both sexes have a matte abdomen with a dark brown/black shiny body.

Funnel web spiders are mainly nocturnal and perform their hunting, web-making and mating at night. The female Atrax yorkmainorum spends most of its time within its distinguishable burrow that is lined with silk trip lines that extrude out from the tunnel. It preys on small and large insects as well as lizards that walk across the silk trip lines. The spider will sense the vibrations from the web, then attack its prey by injecting venom with its fangs to immobilise and break down its victim. During mating, the second leg of the female spider is locked in a raised position by the characteristic dorsal spine on the males second pair of legs. Once locked in the raised position, the male releases his sperm into the females spermathecae where it is then stored until the female allows fertilisation of the eggs. Male spiderlings mature within 3–4 years of being in the burrow while the final moult for females occurs 1–2 years after the male.

Atrax yorkmainorum does not have a widespread distribution within Australia, remaining within the forest areas of south-eastern New South Wales, as well as the Australian Capital Territory. Most sightings occur during the humid, wet months where male activity is at its highest. Funnel web spiders belonging to the Atrax genus are highly venomous spiders and chance of death without anti-venom is high. The venom of the male spider is significantly more toxic than the female spider's venom. The spiders venom contains neurotoxic toxins such as δ-atracotoxin, that interfere with voltage gated sodium channel activation, which is responsible for the paralyses effect of Atrax bites.

Some of the systemic symptoms of Atrax yorkmainorum envenomation include mouth spasms, tongue and muscle fasciculation, nausea, hypersalivation, increased sweating and pulmonary edema. Pressure immobilisation bandaging (PIB) is used to delay envenoming until an anti-venom is accessible. An anti-venom for Atrax spider bites has been available since the late 1980s and has saved many lives from funnel web spider envenomation.

== Taxonomy and naming ==
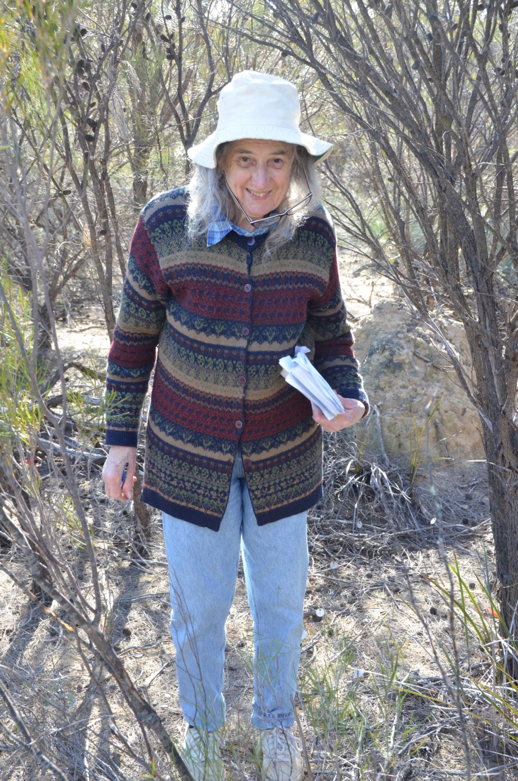
Professor Barbara York Main

Atrax yorkmainorum is an Australian mygalomorph funnel-web spider, belonging to the family Atracidae. According to historical records, O. Pickard-Cambridge was the first individual to document Atrax as a genus in 1877 in The Annals and Magazine of Natural History

The Atrax species yorkmainorum was first described in an Australian Museum review of funnel web spiders many years later in 2010 by Michael Gray. Arachnologist, Professor Barbara York Main and her husband professor Bert Main of zoology made many contributions to the arachnology and zoology field, thus the species name yorkmainorum was named after the couple. After the death of Barbra York Main, many other genera of invertebrates were named after her

== Description: appearance and body structure ==
The adult male of this spider species is reported to have an average body length between 16-17mm and average width of 7mm which includes the carapace (cephalothorax) and the abdomen, non-inclusive of legs. The dorsal groove present in the centre of the carapace is narrow and bent in a forward direction with small, fine hairs on the anterior carapace. The sternum of the average male is 4.43mm in length and oval-shaped with strong posterior hairs. Unlike spiders with long, slender legs such as the red back, Atrax yorkmainorum has wide legs averaging at 1.71mm with a length of 21.5mm.

The female spider differs slightly in size, averaging at 18.84mm in body length and 7.5mm in body width. The characteristics of the dorsal groove is identical to the male species, as is the sternum (4.59mm). The average length of female spider legs is approximately 18.7mm, the first and last pair being the longest for both sexes. Each spider has a pair of venomous fangs (5mm) connected to the chelicerae on each side. Both sexes have a deep dark brown or black appearance with a shiny body and matte abdomen.

Features that distinguish Atrax yorkmainorum from Atrax robustus and Atrax sutherlandi is its slightly smaller size, absence of dorsal tibial spines on its pedipalp and the sleek, curved embolus on the male, as described by Michael, R Gray

== Behaviour ==
=== Web ===
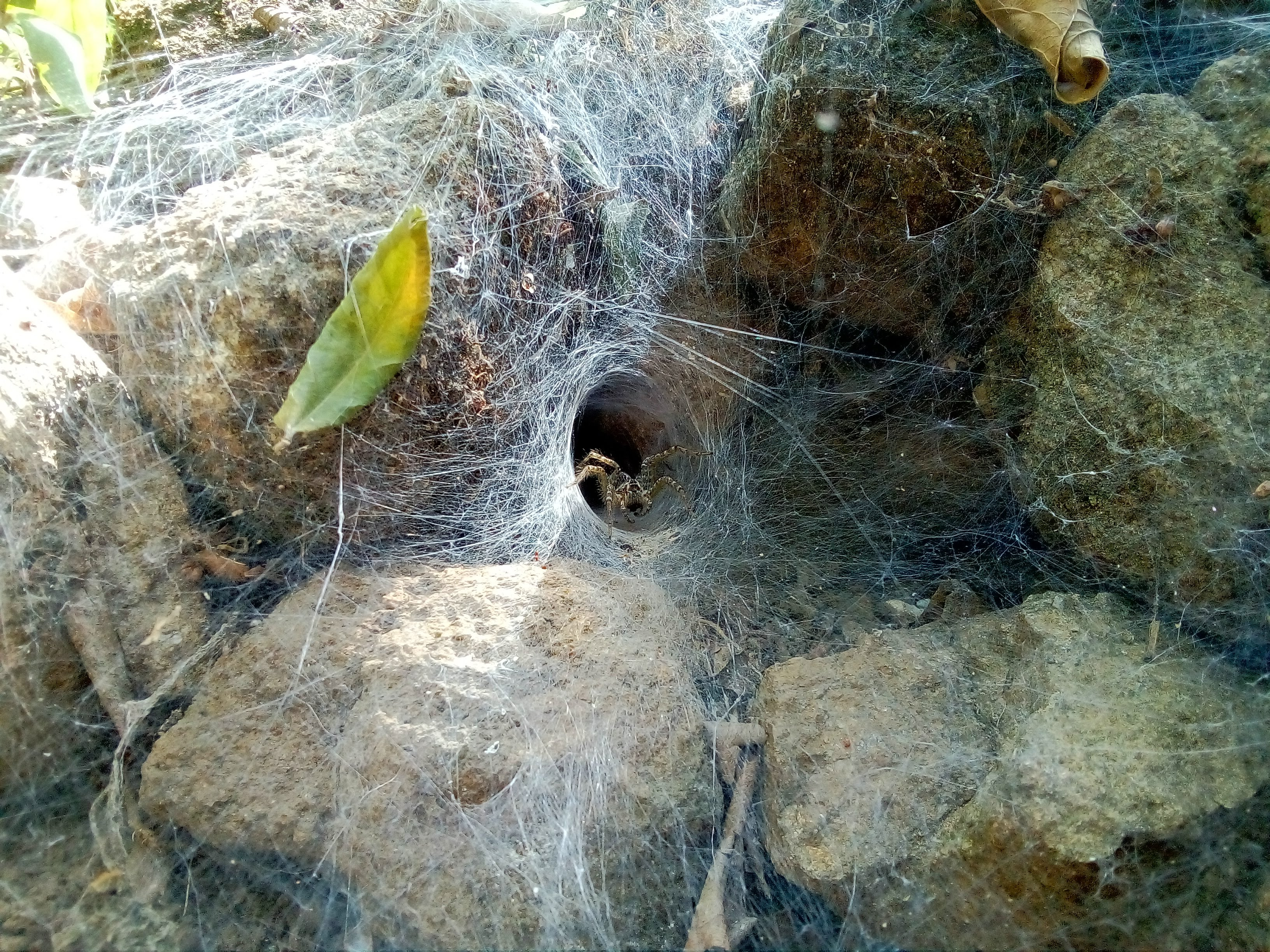
Typical web of a funnel web spider (Atrax yorkmainorum not shown)

Funnel web spiders including Atrax yorkmainorum are mostly nocturnal, performing their hunting and web-making at night. The web of this species is distinguishable due to the silk trip-lines that exude out from the occupied tunnel.

The silk trip-lines are arranged in an irregular fashion lining the burrow, which extends roughly the length of an adult forearm. This arrangement allows the spider to be alerted when there are potential prey or predators at the burrow through the consequent vibrations from the silk. According to the Australian Museum, other spiders that live in burrows but possess different web patterns include the common trapdoor spider, mouse spider and wolf spider.

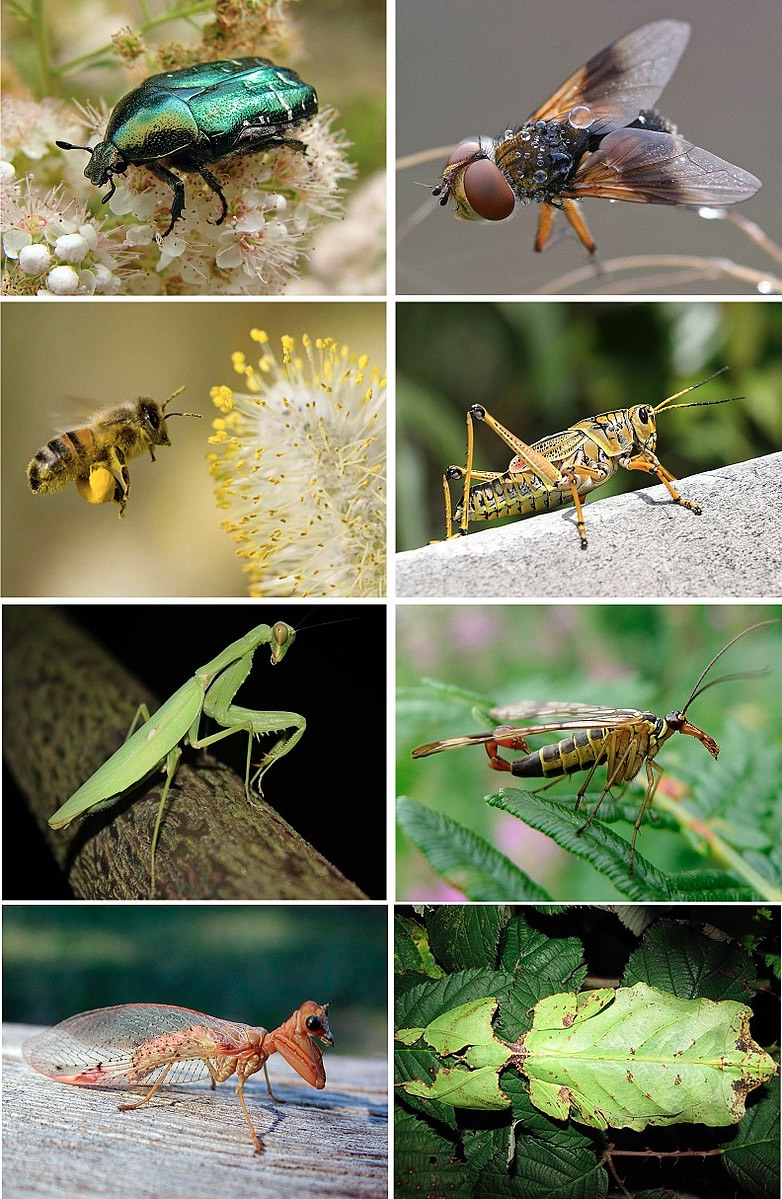
Funnel web spider prey

=== Prey ===
The diet of Atrax yorkmainorum primarily consists of small and large insects, as well as small lizards. When it comes time to hunt, the spider will remain in standby in the burrow, stalking its prey until it is alerted that there is a creature walking across the white silk lines. Once alerted that there is an insect such as a beetle or cockroach, the spider advances towards the prey, injecting venom to immobilise and liquify its target to aid in digestion. For flying insects, the spider will stand on its hind legs to strike at the insect with its front legs. When threatened, Atrax species will adopt a similar stance, raising their front legs at their potential predator.

== Reproduction and lifecycle ==
Male and female Atrax yorkmainorum possess reproductive organs and appendages that enable successful mating and reproduction. On the distal end of the male tibia, there is a characteristic spine on the second pair of legs which assists in the mating process. According to this researcher, the presence of the spine allows the females second leg to "lock... in a raised position to enable mating and...prevent descent of the female's fangs". The mating behaviours of funnel web spiders is similar across species, with few species-specific differences. As with hunting, mating also occurs during the night in summer and spring months. After locating a female mate through pheromone sensing, the male spider will begin the mating ritual by moving in a specific way on the female spiders' silk trap-lines to generate vibrations that the female recognises as a mating signal rather than a prey alert.

According to literature, the embolus of the male Atrax yorkmainorum is approximately 3mm in length with an accompanying narrow ejaculatory groove. This reproductive structure is longer in Atrax yorkmainorum species compared to the Atrax sutherlandi species (1mm difference). The embolus of the male is attached to its genital bulb, also known as the palpal organ. Once the female spider is locked in the raised position, the male inserts his long embolus into the female, releasing his semen into her curved spermathecae. Although the male ejects its sperm into the female's reproductive organ, the sperm will be stored in the females spermathecae before the eggs are fertilised.

After the spiderlings hatch from the females' egg sack, they will remain in the burrow until further maturity is reached. For the male Atrax species, this will occur within 3–4 years of being in the burrow, whilst for females, the final moulting process will occur 1–2 years after the male.

== Distribution and habitat ==
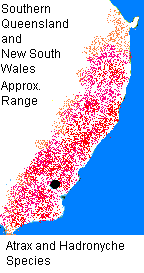
Distribution of Atrax and Hadronyche in Australia

Atrax yorkmainorum is not currently widespread across Australia. The distribution of these spiders is reported to be within forest areas of south-eastern New South Wales, as well as the Australian Capital Territory according to the Australian Museum records. Common places where sightings have occurred include the alpine ash Bago State Forest and Dora Dora National park in NSW and the Uriarra Forest and Tidbinbilla Nature Reserve in ACT. The most recent recorded sighting of Atrax yorkmainorum was on the Mount Ainslie Walking Trail in ACT in late 2020.

The chance of encountering a funnel web spider is increased during the humid, wet months as the male is most active in these conditions as it provides a more favourable environment. Funnel web spiders are commonly found living in sheltered habitats such as under rocks or logs.

== Atrax bites ==
=== Incidence ===
Funnel web spiders belonging to the genre Atrax have been reported to be one of the most dangerous arachnoids around the world. The Sydney funnel web spider Atrax robustus is the most common species of Atrax involved in human death from spider bites. According to literature, only 10-15% of funnel web spider bites are venomous, however the toxicity of funnel web spider venom is high and chance of fatality is major. Although the incidence of bites from Atrax yorkmainorum specifically has not been widely documented, the venom of this species is of equal concern to other Atrax species. Due to the nocturnal behaviour of the Atrax species, spider bites are more frequent during summer and spring nights as the male spiders enter homes for shelter. Generally, the toxicity of spider venom is significantly higher in males than females, where species such as Atrax robustus show a 7-fold difference in toxicity.

=== Venom ===
Acetylcholine

The venom of Atrax yorkmainorum is neurotoxic and produced by specialised glands within the spider's mouthparts known as the chelicerae. The release of venom from the glandular lumen of the spider occurs through contraction of the muscular layers surrounding the venom gland. After contraction, the venom passes through to the fangs of the funnel web spider. The components of the spiders’ venom permit immobilisation of prey from protein substances and contains toxins that interfere with the nervous system of its victim.

For Atrax species specifically, the toxin δ-atracotoxin is responsible for the neurotoxic effects of the venom. According to studies done on newborn mice, the lethal dose of Atrax venom for these mammals is approximately 0.16 mg/kg with a pH of 4.5-5. These toxins interfere with the normal function of sodium ion voltage-gated channels by slowing the inactivation of these channels. The resulting slow inactivation of sodium channels leads to inappropriate overstimulation of neurotransmitters such as acetylcholine, which is responsible for the paralyses effect of Atrax bites.

== Atrax bite symptoms and treatment ==
=== Symptoms ===
Due to the large fang size of Atrax species (~5mm), the spider bite is painful and will usually leave a mark on its victim. The systemic symptoms of envenomation occurs within 10 minutes of the spider bite and may include effects such as mouth numbness or spams, shortness of breath and tongue fasciculation. It is common for humans to experience nausea, vomiting and increased salivation and sweating. As described in literature, in severe cases patients may experience muscle fasciculation, high blood pressure, irregular heartbeat and a build-up of fluid in the lungs. Muscle and abdominal cramps are also common side effects

The effect of the venom toxin on the cardiorespiratory system is the main cause of death for individuals if anti-venom therapy is unavailable. Death from an Atrax spider bite occurs more rapidly in young children compared to adults due to their small body size. According to Professor James Tibballs, death in young children may occur approximately 15–90 minutes following an attack compared to adults which can take over 30 hours after a bite.

=== First aid ===
The protocol for treating an Atrax yorkmainorum spider bite is the same amongst all funnel web spiders. Pressure bandaging above or below the bite and immobilisation of the individual must be performed immediately if the patient develops signs of systemic envenoming. Pressure immobilisation bandaging first aid is required to delay envenoming and should only removed once the patient has been taken to a hospital or medical centre that possesses anti-venom. According to Geoffrey K Isbister, after stabilisation of the airways, two vials of anti-venom should be administered intravenously to the patient every 15–30 minutes until symptoms subside.

Following the administration of anti-venom, the patient must be monitored for >24 hours. Acute allergic reactions to anti-venom are a possibility, however the chance of this occurring is unlikely. If the bite is minor and presents no immediate symptoms of envenomation, a minimum four-hour observation period post bite is recommended. The pressure immobilisation bandage can be removed after the first two hours of observation if anti-venom is available.

The development of anti-venom in the 1980s by Dr. Struan Sutherland has prevented many deaths from envenomation since it became available. If hyper secretion is still occurring in the patient, a dose of 0.6-1.2 mg of atropine can be administered to an adult, or 0.02 mg/kg to a child.

== See also ==
- Atrax
- Spider anatomy
- Australian funnel-web spider
