= Versutoxin =

Spider toxin

Delta Hexatoxin Hv1a
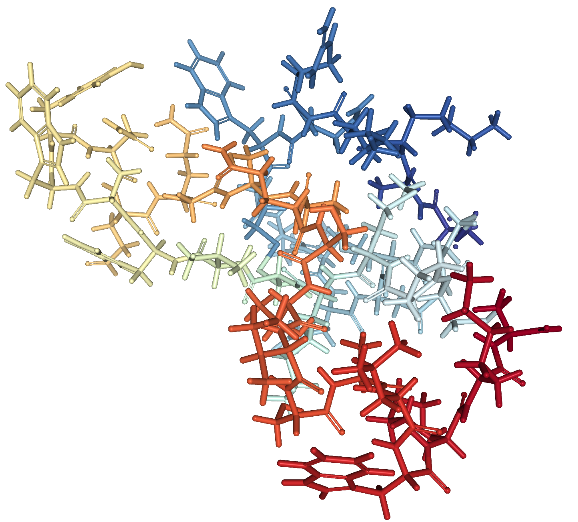
- 3D stick model of delta-hexatoxin-Hv1 (versutoxin)

Identifiers
- Symbol: δ-HXTX-Hv1a
- Pfam: PF05353
- InterPro: IPR008017
- OPM superfamily: 112
- OPM protein: 1vtx
Available protein structures:
- Pfam: structures / ECOD
- PDB: RCSB PDB; PDBe; PDBj
- PDBsum: structure summary

Delta hexatoxin Hv1 (δ-HXTX-Hv1a, Versutoxin, or Versutotoxin, formerly known as Delta atracotoxin Hv1 and δ-ACTX-Hv1a) is a neurotoxic component found in the venom of the Australian funnel web spider (Atrax robustus).

Delta hexatoxin Hv1 can result in fatality for primates, by downregulating the inactivation of voltage gated sodium ion channels (VGSCs) found in motor neurons.

The structure of versutoxin contains a central beta region with a cystine knot motif, commonly found in other neurotoxic polypeptides, but not found in sea anemone or alpha-scorpion toxins despite their similar effects in terms of sodium channel modulation.

== Nomenclature ==
In 1997, Jamie I. Fletcher and his research associates introduced new nomenclature for classifying Australian funnel web spider toxins. They suggested replacing the trivial name 'versutoxin' with delta-hexatoxin-Hv1 instead. The delta represents the main biological activity of the neurotoxin; inhibiting sodium channels.

In more recent research, atracotoxins have been rebranded as hexatoxins, but the two are still used interchangeably along with the abbreviations HXTX and ACTX. Delta and Hv1 are still used to specify the neurotoxic peptide versutoxin.

== Structure ==
Delta hexatoxin Hv1 is a tightly folded polypeptide that contains a chain of 42 amino acid residues and has the chemical formula C_{206}H_{318}N_{58}O_{60}S_{9}^{.} The amino acid sequence of delta hexatoxin Hv1 is:

CAKKRNWCGKTEDCCCPMKCVYAWYNEQGSCQSTISALWKKC

The tertiary structure of δ-ACTX-Hv1 contains a core β region that is made up of the residues Cys1–Cys8, Cys14–Val21, and Ser30–Ser33, with Tyr22–Gly29 protruding outwards. The β region has a three-stranded antiparallel β sheet comprising Asn6–Trp7 (β1), Met18–Val21 (β2), and Ser30–Ser33 (β3). The C-terminal end of the short β1 is held in place by a bifurcated hydrogen bond between the Cys8 amide proton and the carbonyl oxygens of the two residues preceding β strand 3 (Gln28 and Gly29). The β region also contains type II β turns at Lys3–Asn6 and Cys15–Met18 with a rare cis peptide bond at Cys16–Met 17. The nonpolar C-terminal 3_{10} helix formed by Ile35–Lys41, bordering Lys40 and Lys41 and connecting to β region with a disulphide bond next to a β turn. The β region contains hydrophobic cysteine sidechains bordered by a lysine sidechain.Three of the four disulphide bonds form the ICK. The structure of the cystine knot motif found in versutoxin is similar to the one found in gurmarin, a 35-residue plant polypeptide used to test the inhibition of sweet taste receptors.

== Uses ==
The peptides found in various venomous animals are capable of reducing inflammation, inactivating ion channels, and altering neurotransmitter production. Therefore, understanding the neurotoxins produced by these animals can potentially used as therapeutics for slowing down neurodegeneration. There are still many limitations in this research due to a lack of sufficient natural resources, however using recombinant DNA is used a way to mitigate this issue by promoting heterologous protein expression and peptide chemical synthesis.

=== Mechanism behind Neurotoxic Properties ===
Versutoxin, in particular, is capable of affecting the voltage-gated sodium channels of prey. Studies conducted on primates show that δ-hexatoxin causes the neurotoxic effects by binding to VGSCs on neurons. δ-ACTX affects VGSCs similarly to α-scorpion and sea anemone toxins. Both of these types of toxins bind specifically to site 3 on the sodium channel. Despite versutoxin having a ICK which both α-scorpion and sea anemone toxins lack, researchers determined several other similarities in their anionic and cationic residue topography and confirmed that versutoxin also binds to site 3. They tested this by seeing how purified delta-ACTX-Hv1a affects the isolated cockroach (Periplaneta americana) dorsal unpaired median (DUM) neurons using a double sucrose-gap technique and comparing it to how it affected rat dorsal root ganglion (DRGs) neurons. They noted how delta-ACTX-Hv1a specifically affected voltage-gated Na+ channels of both specimens resulting in incomplete steady-state Na+ channel inactivation.

=== Current Applications ===
Voltage gated sodium channels have been used as therapeutic targets in various modes of research, allowing versutoxin to also be used in the process. Some notable diseases versutoxin has been used as a potential therapeutic tool in include: Alzheimer's disease, Parkinson's disease, brain ischemia, glaucoma, and sclerosis.

Versutoxin has also been used in biopesticide research. The structure of recombinant Nemertide α-1 (a neurotoxin found in carnivorous marine ribbon worms) was compared against recombinant delta-hexatoxin-Hv1 due to their similar VSGC targeting abilities. However, as of right now, not enough research has been done about the off target effects.

== See also ==
- Atracotoxin
