= Pressure immobilisation technique =

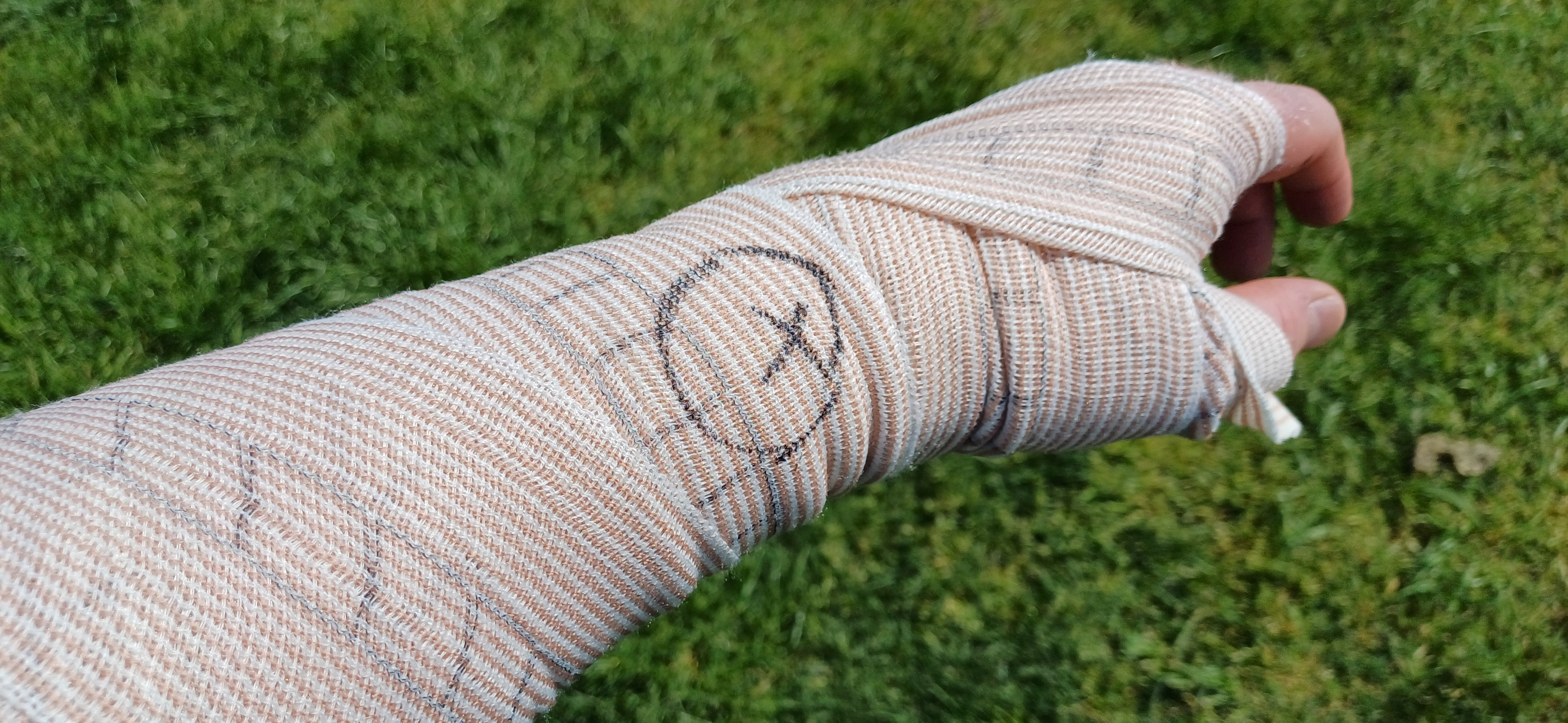
Pressure immobilisation technique on arm

The pressure immobilisation technique is a first aid treatment used as a way to treat spider bite, snakebite, bee, wasp and ant stings in allergic individuals, blue ringed octopus stings, cone shell stings, etc.The object of pressure immobilisation is to delay the spread of venom from a bitten or stung limb through the lymphatic system to the vital organs. This therapy has two components: applying pressure to slow lymphatic drainage, and immobilizing the affected limb to reduce the pumping action of skeletal muscles. Because muscle movement promotes lymphatic flow, the limb needs to be immobilised with a splint after the pressure bandage is applied. This helps delay the systemic spread of venom, buying time until medical care is available.

== Evidence ==
As of 2008, clinical evidence for pressure immobilisation for snakebite was not well established, with clinicians recommending its continued practice for certain snakes (including all snakes in Australia), but calling for further research.

== Technique ==
An elastic or firm bandage is wound firmly around the limb in overlapping turns, starting at the fingers or toes of the affected limb and continuing as far up the limb as possible to apply pressure. The pressure of the bandage should be firm enough that the first aider's finger cannot slide underneath, but not so tight that it cuts off circulation to the hand/foot. This can be tested by lightly pinching or pressing a toe or finger until it blanches white, then when the press/pinch is stopped, pinkness should return within seconds. Some swelling of the hand/foot is expected. A specialised snake bite bandage with indicators is commonly used for this.

The limb is then immobilised by prompting the casualty not to move, or where possible by applying a splint or sling. The location of the bite is then marked on the outside of the bandage where possible.

== History ==
The technique was developed in the 1970s by Australian medical researcher Struan Sutherland.

Today, it is the recommended first-aid procedure in Australia for treating snake and funnel web spider bites.
