= Omega-Atracotoxin =

Insect-specific neurotoxin

ω-Atracotoxin

Identifiers
- Symbol: Omega-toxin
- Pfam: PF06357
- InterPro: IPR009415
- SCOP2: 1hvw / SCOPe / SUPFAM
Available protein structures:
- Pfam: structures / ECOD
- PDB: RCSB PDB; PDBe; PDBj
- PDBsum: structure summary
- PDB: 1hvwA:4-23 1axh :1-37

omega-Atracotoxin (ω-atracotoxin) is an insect-specific neurotoxin produced by the Blue Mountains funnel-web spider. Its phylogenetic specificity derives from its ability to antagonise insect, but not vertebrate, voltage-gated calcium channels. Two spatially proximal amino acid residues, Asn(27) and Arg(35), form a contiguous molecular surface that is essential for toxin activity. It has been proposed that this surface of the beta-hairpin is a key site for interaction of the toxin with insect calcium channels.

== See also ==
- Atracotoxin
