= Atracotoxin =

Atracotoxin may refer to:

- δ-Atracotoxin (robustoxin or versutoxin)
- ω-Atracotoxin
