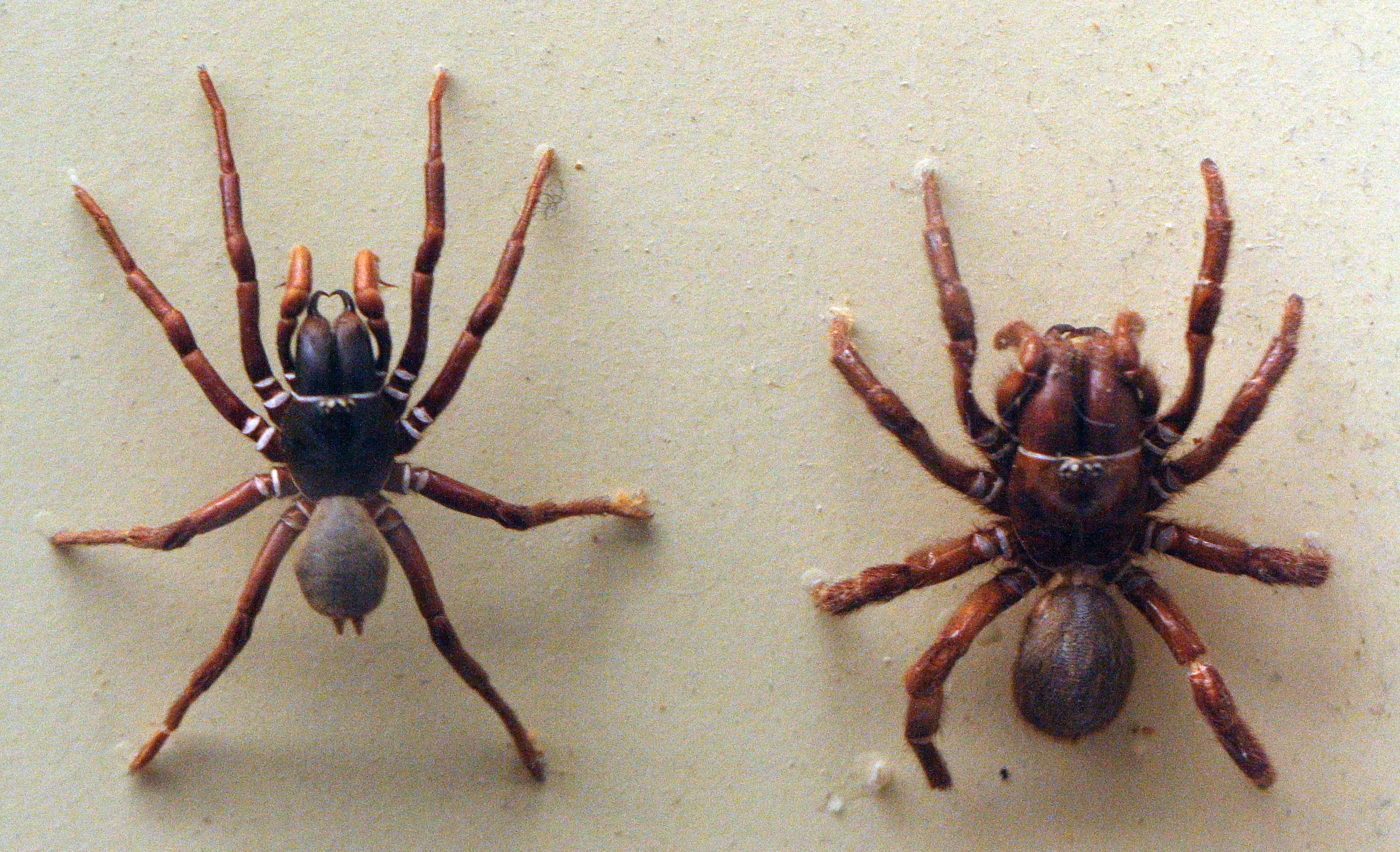
- Male and female

Scientific classification
- Kingdom: Animalia
- Phylum: Arthropoda
- Subphylum: Chelicerata
- Class: Arachnida
- Order: Araneae
- Infraorder: Mygalomorphae
- Family: Atracidae
- Genus: Atrax
- Species: A. sutherlandi

Binomial name
- Atrax sutherlandi Gray, 2010

= Atrax sutherlandi =

Species of spider

Atrax sutherlandi is a species of Australian funnel-web spider found in forests on the far southern coast of New South Wales and in eastern Victoria. It was named after Struan Sutherland, whose work resulted in a successful funnel-web spider antivenom.

Normally, A. sutherlandi has a glossy black back and chelicerae ("fangs"), as well as a deep-brown or plum-coloured underbelly. An adult grows to a length of 2 inches (5 cm). A report in 2015 described an unusual individual with a blood-red belly and chelicerae. Unlike its close relative the Sydney funnel web that lives in urban areas, A. sutherlandi commonly resides in remote areas, thus posing little danger to the public.

Due to the niche microhabitat of the Atrax sutherlandi, species divergence can easily occur when there is minor change in the environment.
