= Delta atracotoxin =

Polypeptide found in the venom of the Sydney funnel-web spider

Delta Atracotoxin
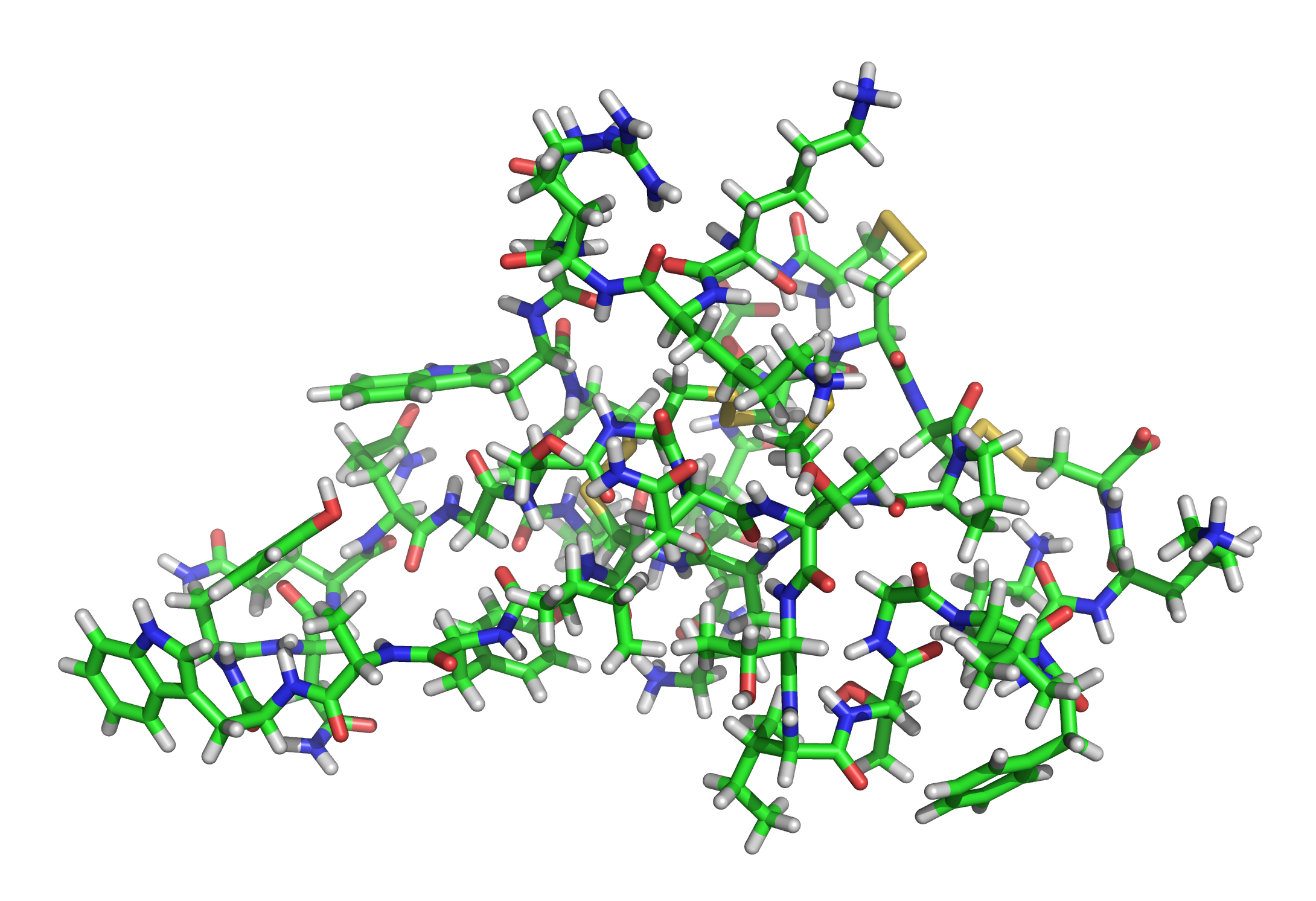
- 3D stick model of delta-atracotoxin-Ar1 (robustoxin)

Identifiers
- Symbol: Atracotoxin
- Pfam: PF05353
- InterPro: IPR008017
- SCOP2: 1qdp / SCOPe / SUPFAM
- OPM superfamily: 112
- OPM protein: 1vtx
Available protein structures:
- PDB: IPR008017 PF05353 (ECOD; PDBsum)
- AlphaFold: IPR008017; PF05353

Delta atracotoxin (δ-ACTX-Ar1, robustoxin, or robustotoxin) is a low-molecular mass neurotoxic polypeptide found in the venom of the Sydney funnel-web spider (Atrax robustus).

Delta atracotoxin produces potentially fatal neurotoxic symptoms in primates, by slowing the inactivation of sodium ion channels in autonomic and motor neurons. In the spiders' intended insect prey, the toxin exerts this same activity upon calcium ion channels.

The structure of atracotoxin comprises a core beta region with a cystine knot motif, a feature seen in other neurotoxic polypeptides.

== History ==
Since 1927, records are kept of envenomations of humans by the Sydney funnel-web spider, and 14 deaths have been reported in medical literature between 1927 and 1981, when the antivenom became available. In all cases in which the sex of the spider was determined, death occurred after a bite from a male spider.

== Structure ==
Delta atracotoxin is a 42-residue peptide toxin with the chemical formula C_{206}H_{313}N_{59}O_{59}S_{9}. The amino acid sequence of delta atracotoxin is unusual in that it contains three consecutive cysteine residues at positions 14–16. The amino acid sequence of delta atracotoxin is:

CAKKRNWCGK NEDCCCPMKC IYAWYNQQGS CQTTITGLFK KC

Cysteine bridges exist between Cys1 and Cys15, Cys8 and Cys20, Cys14 and Cys31, and Cys16 and Cys42.

The structure consists of a small triple-stranded beta-sheet stabilized by a disulfide knot, followed by a C-terminal extension comprising three classic or inverse y-turns. The disulfide knot is a ring consisting of two disulfide bonds (1-15 and 8-20) and the connecting backbone, through which a third disulfide bond (14–31) passes. The β-sheet, defined on the basis of inter-sheet hydrogen bonds, consists of residues 6-8 (strand I), 19-21 (strand II) and 29-32 (strand III), with a topology of +2x, —1. The two hydrogen bonds (one amide of which has a slowly exchanging amide proton) between strands I and III are distorted (NH to CO distance between 2.5 and 3.0 A). There are four hydrogen bonds between strands II and III (all of which have corresponding slowly exchanging amide protons), three being present in most of the structures and one in half of the structures. The structure contains a number of chain reversals. The first is not well defined and is either a type II β-turn (Lys3-Asn6) or a y-turn centered on Arg5. Chain reversal II is a y turn centered on Gly9. Chain reversal III is not well defined, being either a type I β-turn (Asnn-Cys14) or an inverse y-turn centered on Asn11. Chain reversal IV (Cys15-Met18) is not stabilized by a hydrogen bond but has a cis peptide bond between Cys16 and Pro17 and resembles a type Via turn. The fifth chain reversal occurs in the region of residues 22–28, which fulfill the criteria for an i2-loop. The C-terminal extension, stabilized by the Cys16-Cys42 disulfide bond, consists of three y-turns, VI-VIII, that are, respectively, an inverse turn, centered on Thr33, a classic turn centered on Ile35 and an inverse turn centered on Phe39. All three of the y-turn hydrogen bonds have slowly exchanging amide protons (although this is not the case for the other turns). The only slowly exchanging amide proton not accounted for by consensus hydrogen bonds in any secondary structure element is that of Gly37 (which hydrogen bonds to Thr34 in one of the structures). The conformations of the Cys1-Cys15 and Cys8-Cys20 disulfide bonds are well defined and have negative and positive Xss, respectively; the other two bonds have lower order parameters. The hydrophobic core of RBX is limited, consisting of essentially the disulfide knot cystine residues and the buried Met18. The 22-28 loop contains one apolar residue, Ala23, and three aromatics, Tyr22, Trp24 and Tyr25, and is flanked by Ile21 at its N-terminus and Trp7 near its C-terminus, so this region represents a significant non-polar surface on the molecule. RBX is highly positively charged, with one Arg (sequence position 5) and six Lys (3, 4, 10, 19, 40 and 41) residues, balanced only by Glu12 and Asp13. These charged residues form three patches on the surface. Patch A consists of the positively charged residues 3,4 and 5, patch B of residues 10, 12, 13 and the N-terminus (including possible salt bridges between Lys10 and Glu12 and Asp13 and the N-terminus), and patch C of 19, 40, 41 and the C-terminus.

== Mechanism of action ==
Delta atracotoxin is responsible for the potentially lethal envenomation syndrome seen following funnel-web spider envenomation. d-Atracotoxins induce spontaneous, repetitive firing and prolongation of action potentials resulting in continuous acetylcholine neurotransmitter release from somatic and autonomic nerve endings. This will lead to slower voltage-gated sodium channel inactivation and a hyperpolarizing shift in the voltage-dependence of activation. This action is due to voltage-dependent binding to neurotoxin receptor site-3 in a similar, but not identical, fashion to scorpion a-toxins and sea anemone toxins. In the sea anemone and scorpion toxins, combinations of charged (especially cationic) and hydrophobic side-chains are important for binding to their receptor site (site 3) on the sodium channel. The same applies to delta atracotoxin and versutoxin (a close homologue of delta atracotoxin). Delta atracotoxin presents three distinct charged patches on its surface, as well as a non-polar region centered on the 22-28 loop. Both of these structural features may play a role in its binding to the voltage-gated sodium channel, but further studies are necessary in defining which residues are important for interaction with the sodium channel so that a plausible model can be constructed of its binding site.

=== Synthetic ===
The availability of synthetic toxin has allowed scientists to further explore the biological activity of the toxin, resulting in the observation that d-ACTX-Ar1a causes repetitive firing and prolongation of the action potential. These actions underlie the clinical symptoms seen following envenomation and further contribute to the understanding of the molecular basis for activity of this potent neurotoxin on voltage-gated sodium channels.

Under voltage-clamp conditions in dorsal root ganglion (DRG) neurons it was found that the effects of the synthetic toxin on sodium currents were not significantly different from those previously reported for the native toxin. Neither native nor synthetic d-ACTX-Ar1a had any effect on TTX-resistant sodium currents, but both exerted a potent selective modulation of TTX-sensitive sodium currents consistent with actions on neurotoxin receptor site-3. This includes a slowing of the sodium-channel inactivation, a hyperpolarizing shift in the voltage-dependence of activation and a hyperpolarizing shift in the steady-state sodium-channel inactivation.

d-ACTX-Ar1a causes a prolongation of action potential duration, accompanied by spontaneous repetitive firing, but does not depolarize the resting membrane potential. Effects on the autonomic nervous system, including vomiting, profuse sweating, salivation, lachrymation, marked hypertension followed by hypotension, together with effect on the somatic nervous system to cause muscle fasciculation and dyspnea (shortness of breath) are presumably due to excessive transmitter release. To identify the sodium-channel binding surface of d-ACTX-Ar1a, scientist must synthesize analogues with selected residue changes. Studies will contribute to a more detailed mapping of site-3, the neurotoxin receptor site on the sodium-channel and provide structure-activity data critical for determining the phyla-specific actions of this and related atracotoxins.

== Toxicity ==
The toxicity of the spider's venom is affected by the sex of the spider. The male funnel-web spider's venom appears to be six times more powerful than that of the female spider, based on minimum lethal dose determinations. In addition, different species of animals tend to react to the venom in various ways. For example, rats, rabbits and cats are unaffected by the bite of a female funnel-web spider, whereas for 20 percent of mice and guinea pigs the bite of a female was fatal. A bite of a male funnel-web spider, though, led to the death of almost all mice and guinea pigs. Although the male spider's venom seems to be more potent, male spider bites cause mild transient effects in dogs and cats. Most primates, including humans, appear to be extremely sensitive to the funnel-web spider's venom.

The LD_{50} in mice of the male spiders crude venom was found to be 11.3 mg/kg. The female spiders venom was found to be 80 mg/kg. The LD_{50} value of pure delta atracotoxin which was isolated from a male spider was 0.16 mg/kg when tested on mice less than 2 days old.

== Signs and symptoms ==
The bite of a Sydney funnel web spider is at first painful, due to the large fangs and acidic pH of the venom. If there is no immediate treatment symptoms may arise beginning ten minutes after the bite. Hypertension may occur, which is often followed by a prolonged hypotension and circulatory failure. Other symptoms include dyspnea and ultimately respiratory failure, generalized skeletal muscle fasciculation, salivation, lachrymation, sweating, nausea, vomiting, diarrhoea, pulmonary edema and pain.

The progress of the envenomation is precisely studied in primates, which symptoms are very similar to those of humans. In the first 25 minutes after envenomation disturbances in respiration occur, which gradually become worse. Some monkeys required artificial ventilation. Initially, the blood pressure decreased, but then quickly rose, after which the blood pressure gradually declined. After 40–100 minutes severe hypotension occurred. Lachrymation started after 6–15 minutes and was followed by salivation. These symptoms were most severe during 15–35 minutes after envenomation. Skeletal muscle fasciculation started after 8–10 minutes and reached its peak between 20 and 45 minutes. It was accompanied with an increase in body temperature.

Envenomation with the male venom produced mostly the same symptoms, although the onset of the symptoms was a little delayed. The female venom also produces the same symptoms, but far less severe.

== Antivenom ==
The antivenom was developed by a team headed by Struan Sutherland at the Commonwealth Serum Laboratories (CSL) in Melbourne. Since the antivenom became available in 1981, there have been no recorded fatalities from Sydney funnel-web spider bites. In September 2012, it was reported that stocks of antivenom were running low, and members of the public were asked to catch the spiders so that they could be milked for their venom. The venom is taken from the spiders by delicately stroking their fangs and collecting the tiny droplets of the deadly venom. The venom is needed to produce the antivenom. One dose of antivenom requires around 70 milkings from a spider.

Funnel web spider antivenom is prepared from the plasma of rabbits immunized with the venom of the male funnel web spider (Atrax robustus). Each vial of the product contains 125 units of antivenom which has been standardized to neutralize 1.25 mg of funnel web spider venom. The product also contains glycine and other rabbit plasma proteins.

Funnel web spider antivenom is a purified immunoglobulin (mainly immunoglobulin G), derived from rabbit plasma, which contains specific antibodies against the toxic substances in the venom of the funnel web spider, Atrax robustus. There is evidence to show that the antivenom is effective in the treatment of patients bitten by some other funnel web spiders of the genus Hadronyche (formerly Atrax).

== See also ==
- Atracotoxin
