= Atrax christenseni =

Scientific classification
- Kingdom: Animalia
- Phylum: Arthropoda
- Subphylum: Chelicerata
- Class: Arachnida
- Order: Araneae
- Infraorder: Mygalomorphae
- Family: Atracidae
- Genus: Atrax
- Species: A. christenseni

Binomial name
- Atrax christenseni Dupérré & Smith, 2025

Large Australian venomous spider

Atrax christenseni, the Newcastle funnel-web spider or Newcastle big boy, is a species of venomous mygalomorph funnel-web spider in the family Atracidae, native to an area north of Newcastle in Australia. Its cultural impact is celebrated in a song by Shanty Club, "Newcastle Big Boy".

== Description ==
Atrax christenseni is considered a very large species of funnel-web spider, with adult males exhibiting notable size. The largest recorded male individual measured approximately 9.2 cm (3.6 in) across, including the span of the legs, making it one of the largest members of the genus Atrax. This considerable size, combined with its potent venom, has contributed to the species’ reputation for being among the most venomous and dangerous spiders in the world. Despite the species’ high venom potency, no fatalities have been documented, largely due to the availability of an effective antivenom.

The antivenom developed for the closely related Sydney funnel-web spider (A. robustus) has been shown to be effective in treating bites from A. christenseni as well. This cross-efficacy is attributed to the biochemical similarity of the venom components among species within the Atrax genus, enabling broader protection through the same medical intervention.

== Taxonomy and naming ==
The species was formally described as a new species in 2025. Previously, it was thought to be a local subspecies of the Sydney funnel-web.

The specific epithet christenseni honours Kane Christensen, who contributed specimens that led to the recognition of A. christenseni as a distinct species.

== Distribution and habitat ==
Atrax christenseni occurs in the area north of Newcastle, New South Wales, Australia, where it inhabits silk-lined burrows. The exact location of the spider populations are not published, due to conservation concerns and its venom.
