= Atrax montanus =

Scientific classification
- Kingdom: Animalia
- Phylum: Arthropoda
- Subphylum: Chelicerata
- Class: Arachnida
- Order: Araneae
- Infraorder: Mygalomorphae
- Family: Atracidae
- Genus: Atrax
- Species: A. montanus

Binomial name
- Atrax montanus (Rainbow, 1914)

Large Australian venomous spider

Atrax montanus, the Southern Sydney funnel-web spider, is a species of venomous mygalomorph spider native to eastern Australia, usually found near the Blue Mountains from the Central Coast south to the Georges River, extending as far west as Baulkham Hills near the southern end of its distribution. It is a member of a group of spiders known as Australian funnel-web spiders. The species was described in 1914 but was later considered to be the same species as Atrax robustus until 2025. They have similar distributions and look extremely similar.
