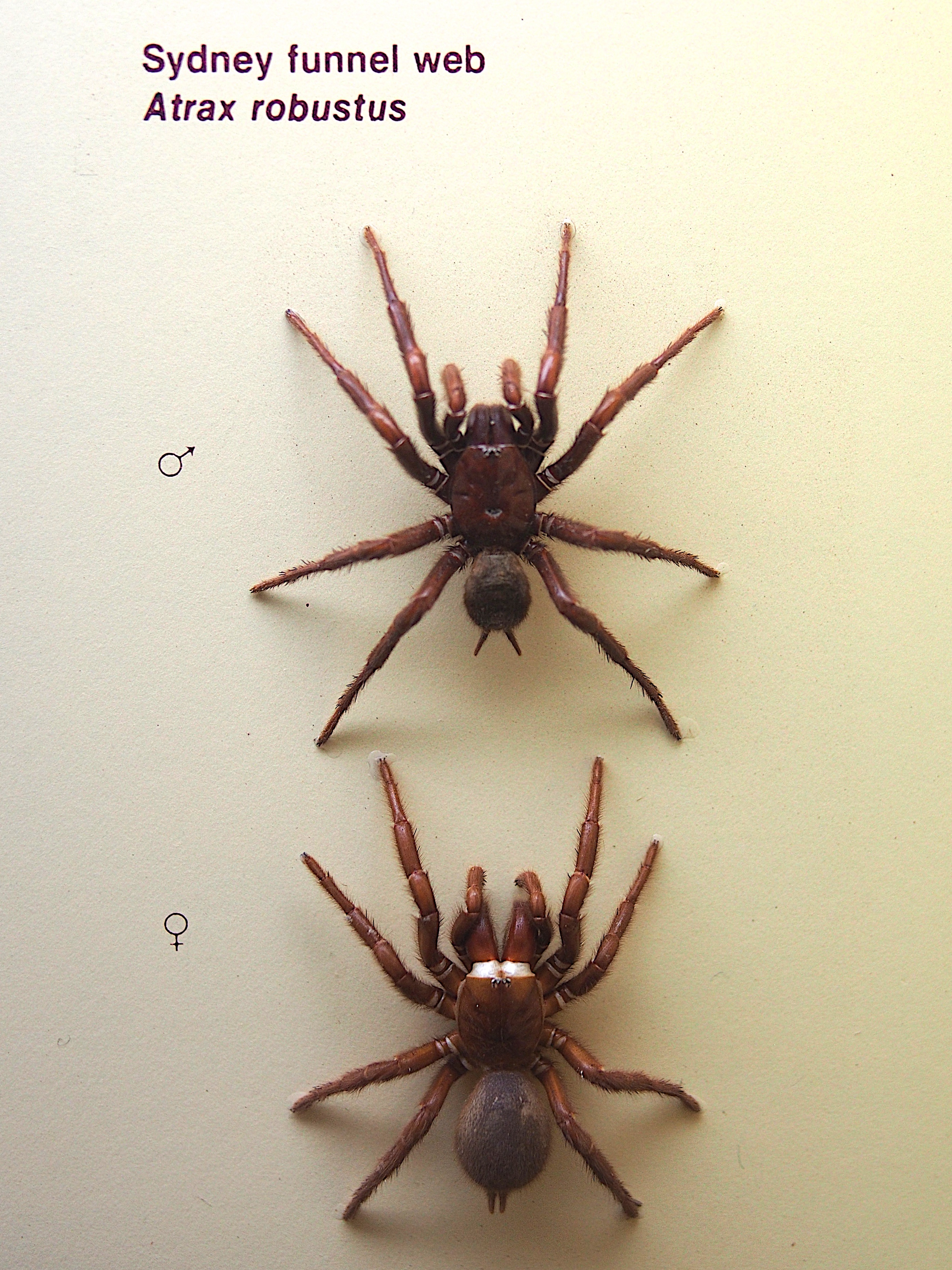
- Male (top) and female

Scientific classification
- Kingdom: Animalia
- Phylum: Arthropoda
- Subphylum: Chelicerata
- Class: Arachnida
- Order: Araneae
- Infraorder: Mygalomorphae
- Family: Atracidae
- Genus: Atrax
- Species: A. robustus

Binomial name
- Atrax robustus O.P.-Cambridge, 1877

Synonyms
- Euctimena tibialis Rainbow, 1914; Poikilomorpha montana Rainbow, 1914

= Sydney funnel-web spider =

Large Australian venomous spider

The Sydney funnel-web spider (Atrax robustus) is a species of venomous mygalomorph spider native to eastern Australia, usually found within a 100 km (62 mi) radius of Sydney. It is a member of a group of spiders known as Australian funnel-web spiders. Its bite is capable of causing serious illness or death in humans if left untreated.

The Sydney funnel-web has a body length ranging from 1 to 5 cm (0.4 to 2 in). Both sexes are glossy and darkly coloured, ranging from blue-black, to black, to shades of brown or dark-plum coloured.

== Taxonomy ==
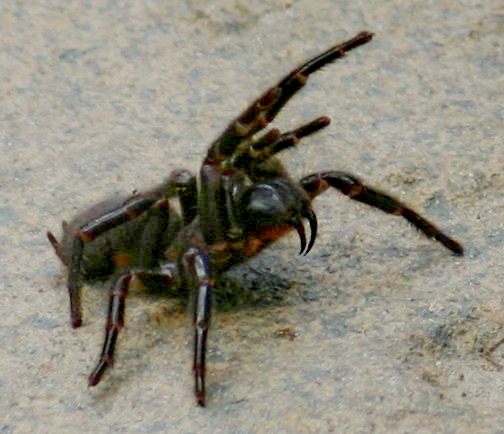
Female Sydney funnel-web spider in a warning posture

Octavius Pickard-Cambridge was the first to describe the Sydney funnel-web spider, from a female specimen housed in the British Museum in 1877. Establishing the genus Atrax, he named it Atrax robustus. The species name is derived from the Latin robustus, "strong/sturdy/mature". Some years later, William Joseph Rainbow described a male Sydney funnel-web as a new species—Euctimena tibialis—from a spider he found under a log in Turramurra, and another from Mosman. He coined the scientific name from Ancient Greek euktimenos, "well-built", and Latin tibialis, "of the tibia", having noted its prominent tibial spur. In the same paper, he described a female Sydney funnel-web spider as yet another species—Poikilomorpha montana—from a specimen collected from Jamison Valley and Wentworth Falls in the Blue Mountains. Its species name was derived from poikilomorphia, "variety of form", referring to the eyes of different sizes, and montana, "of the mountains".

In February 1927, a young boy was bitten on the hand while playing with a large, black spider at his home in the Sydney suburb of Thornleigh. The boy fell gravely ill and died later that evening. Public interest in the spiders surged, and the police brought the dead spider to the Australian Museum, where Anthony Musgrave identified the creature as Euctimena tibialis. He examined a series of male and female spiders collected around Sydney and concluded based on anatomical similarities that Euctimena tibialis was the male Atrax robustus. Poikilomorpha montana was classified as the same species in 1988.

Atrax robustus is one of five species of the genus Atrax in the family Atracidae. The Sydney funnel-web spider shares its name with some members of the genus Hadronyche. It remains, together with the northern tree-dwelling funnel-web, the only two species of Australian funnel-web spider known to have inflicted fatal bites on humans. It was once considered to be the same species as the Southern Sydney funnel-web and Newcastle funnel-web.

== Description ==
The Sydney funnel-web is medium to large in size, with body length ranging from 1 to 5 cm (0.4 to 2 in). Both sexes are glossy and darkly coloured, ranging from blue-black, to black, to brown or dark-plum coloured. The carapace covering the cephalothorax is almost hairless and appears smooth and glossy. Another characteristic is finger-like spinnerets at the end of their abdomen. The shorter-lived male is smaller than the female, but longer-legged. The average leg length for the spider, in general, is six to seven centimetres.

== Distribution and habitat ==
Distribution is centred on Sydney, extending north to the Central Coast and south to the Illawarra region, and west to the Blue Mountains in New South Wales.

The spider can be found in moist microhabitats, including under logs and foliage.

Sydney funnel-web spiders are mostly terrestrial spiders, favouring habitats with moist sand and clays.

== Behaviour ==
They typically build silk-lined tubular burrow retreats with collapsed "tunnels" or open "funnel" entrances from which irregular trip-lines radiate over the ground. In some exceptions, which lack trip-lines but may have trapdoors, the silk entrance tube may be split into two openings, in a Y or T form. The spiders burrow in sheltered habitats where they can find a moist and humid climate; for instance under rocks, logs or borer holes in rough-barked trees. The long-lived female funnel-web spend most of the time in their silk-lined tubular burrow retreats. When potential prey, which includes insects (such as beetles and cockroaches) and their larvae, land snails, millipedes, lizards or frogs, walks across the trip-lines, they rush out, subduing their prey by injecting their venom.

Males, recognised by the modified terminal segment of the palp, tend to wander during the warmer months of the year, looking for receptive females to mate with. This makes encounters with male specimens more likely as they sometimes wander into backyards or houses, or fall into swimming pools. The spiders can survive such immersion for up to twenty-four hours, trapping air bubbles on hairs around their abdomen. Sydney funnel-web spiders are mainly active at night, as typical day-time conditions would dehydrate them. During the day, they seek cover in cool, moist hideaways. After heavy rain, spider activity is increased as their burrows may be flooded. When threatened or provoked, funnel-web spiders will display aggressive behaviour, rearing up on their hind legs and displaying their fangs. When biting, the funnel-web spider maintains a tight grip on its victim, often biting repeatedly.

== Bites to humans ==
=== Venom ===
The lethal dose of venom in humans is not known. The lethal dose of venom from male Sydney funnel-web spiders for the crab-eating macaque (Macaca fascicularis) is 0.2 mg/kg. Higher figures were found for other experimental animals, such as 1.5 mg/kg for two-day-old mice. The average venom yield for a male is 0.81 mg. In doses of the order of 5 mg/kg administered intravenously, Delta atracotoxin the active compound in the venom, kills monkeys in 3–4 hours; the symptoms seen in monkeys were dyspnea, blood pressure fluctuations, culminating in severe hypotension, lacrimation, salivation, skeletal muscle fasciculation and death.

Delta-Atracotoxin is an ion channel inhibitor which makes the venom highly toxic for humans and other primates. However, it does not affect the nervous system of other mammals. The Sydney funnel-web spider typically delivers a full envenomation when it bites, often striking repeatedly, due to the defensiveness of the species and the presence of large cheliceral fangs. There has been no reported case of severe envenoming by female Sydney funnel-web spiders, which is consistent with the finding that the venom of female specimens is less potent than the venom of their male counterparts. In the case of severe envenomation, the time to onset of symptoms is less than one hour, with a study of Sydney funnel-web spider bites finding a median time of 28 minutes. This same study revealed that children are at particular risk of severe Sydney funnel-web spider envenoming, with 42% of all cases of severe envenoming being children.

There is at least one recorded case of a small child dying within 15 minutes of a bite from a funnel-web.

=== Symptoms ===
The bite of a Sydney funnel-web is initially very painful, with clear fang marks separated by several millimetres. The size of fangs is responsible for the initial pain. In some cases the spider will remain attached until dislodged by shaking or flicking it off. Physical symptoms can include intense nausea, vomiting, copious secretion of saliva, muscular twitching and breathing difficulty, disorientation and confusion, leading to unconsciousness.

=== Treatment ===
A Sydney funnel-web bite is regarded as a medical emergency requiring immediate hospital treatment. Guidelines recommend two vials of antivenom, or four if symptoms of envenomation are severe. Patients are assessed every 15 minutes, with further vials recommended if symptoms do not resolve. The most vials that have been used to treat a bite is twelve, for a 10-year-old boy who was bitten in February 2017 by a male Sydney funnel-web that was hiding in a shoe.

The antivenom was developed by a team headed by Struan Sutherland at the Commonwealth Serum Laboratories in Melbourne. Since the antivenom became available in 1981 there have been no recorded fatalities from Sydney funnel-web spider bites. In September 2012 stocks of antivenom were running low, and people were asked to catch the spiders so that they could be milked for their venom. One dose of antivenom requires around 70 milkings from a Sydney funnel-web spider.

The Australian Reptile Park receives Sydney funnel-web spiders as part of its milking program. In January 2016, they received a male Sydney funnel-web with a 10-centimetre (4 in) leg span, described by the park as the largest specimen it had ever seen.
