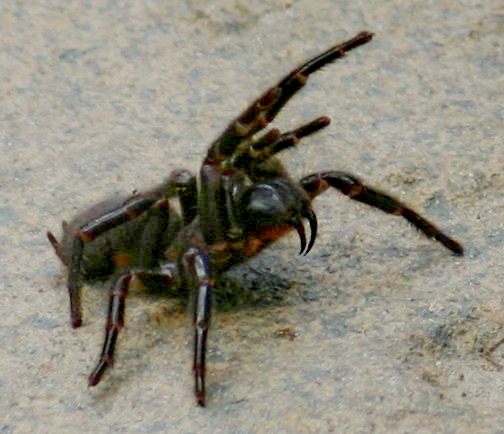
- Female Atrax robustus (Sydney funnel-web spider)

Scientific classification
- Kingdom: Animalia
- Phylum: Arthropoda
- Subphylum: Chelicerata
- Class: Arachnida
- Order: Araneae
- Infraorder: Mygalomorphae
- Family: Atracidae
- Genus: Atrax; O. Pickard-Cambridge, 1877

Type species
- A. robustus O. Pickard-Cambridge, 1877

Species
- See text.

Synonyms
- Poikilomorpha Rainbow, 1914

= Atrax =

Genus of spiders

Atrax is a genus of venomous Australian funnel web spiders that was first described by O. Pickard-Cambridge in 1877 from the type species Atrax robustus. It contains five species. Originally placed with the curtain web spiders, it was moved to the Hexathelidae in 1980, then to the Australian funnel-web spiders in 2018.

== Description ==
They are medium to large spiders for their family, ranging from 1.5 to 4.5 cm. As most in the Mygalomorphae infraorder, they have robust bodies, with a glossy dark colouration in their carapace and legs, and a grey opisthosoma. They also have the same long life, ranging from 4 to 20 years. They are usually found in burrows with little silk lining, under rocks or logs, with their aptly named funnel-like webs. They are found in the coasts and highlands of southeastern Australia.Also, they often spend most of their time in their burrows.

== Identification ==
They can be identified from others of the same family by the large coniform apophysis on the male tibia, and from the Hadronyche by the lower caput height, caput being the front part of the cephalothorax.

== Species ==
As of January 2025, the World Spider Catalog accepted five species:

- A. christenseni Dupérré & Smith, 2025 - Australia (Newcastle) - 'Newcastle funnel-web spider' or 'Newcastle big boy'
- A. montanus Rainbow, 1914 - Australia (New South Wales) - 'Southern Sydney funnel-web spider'
- A. robustus O. Pickard-Cambridge, 1877 – Australia (New South Wales) - 'Sydney funnel-web spider'
- A. sutherlandi Gray, 2010 – Australia (New South Wales, Victoria)
- A. yorkmainorum Gray, 2010 – Australia (New South Wales, Australian Capital Territory)

== Venom ==
This genus includes some of the most dangerous spiders, namely the Sydney funnel-web spider (Atrax robustus). This spider is thought to have killed 13 people. Though none have died since the anti venom has been introduced, many consider this spider to be quite dangerous, and deadly. Most of the bites are thought to be caused by male spiders which wander out of their hides to find a mate.

== Hides ==
These spiders usually make their burrows under rocks or logs, usually in cool humid areas. They make funnel shaped webs, with silk trip lines that radiate from the entrance. These lines function as a warning system, which tell the spiders if there is an insect or possible mate coming. Their hides might flood, forcing them to leave their hides, although they can last a few hours in water, as they are able to trap air bubbles in their abdomen using hairs. They may also leave their burrow to find a mate.

== Phylogeography ==
Phylogeography can be understood as the historical changes or occurrences that bring about a change to a specific species or organism. After extensive studies, researches have found that there are many geographical and genetic differences that have occurred due to micro-habitat distributions. The assumption has been made that the species of Atrax have experienced a shift in genetic structure due to the niches that they inhabit. Habitats are not the only factor to this divergence; researchers have also noted the climatic events, prey availability, and natural occurrence of biodiversity.
