= Struan Sutherland =

Australian medical researcher (1936–2002)

Struan Keith Sutherland
- Born: 17 June 1936; Sydney
- Died: 11 January 2002 (aged 65)
- Education: University of Melbourne
- Known for: Antivenoms and other treatments for funnel-web spider and snakebite
- Awards: AMA Prize for Medical Research (1977), James Cook Medal of the Royal Society of NSW (1984)
- Scientific career
- Fields: Toxicology, Pharmacology, Immunology
- Workplaces: Commonwealth Serum Laboratories (1966–1994), University of Melbourne (1994–1999)

Struan Keith Sutherland AO (17 June 1936 – 11 January 2002) was an Australian medical researcher who developed effective antivenoms and other treatments for people bitten or stung by venomous Australian wildlife.

== Early life ==
Sutherland was born in Sydney and grew up in Bendigo, Victoria. He studied medicine at the University of Melbourne, graduating in 1960, and served in the Royal Australian Navy from 1962 to 1965. Sutherland earned a Doctor of Science doctorate.

== The CSL years ==
In 1966, Dr Sutherland joined the Commonwealth Serum Laboratories (CSL) and was soon appointed the Head of Immunology Research, a position which he held for 28 years.

In the 1970s, Dr Sutherland developed the pressure immobilisation technique (a first-aid procedure) for both snake and funnel-web bites, replacing treatments such as tourniquets that were often harmful to the patient.

The death in January 1979 of 31/32-year-old Christine Sturges from a Sydney funnel-web spider bite prompted Sutherland to look for funnel-web spider antivenom. Many previous researchers had failed to develop such an antivenom, but Sutherland persevered. In January 1980, two-year-old James Cully was bitten by a Sydney funnel-web spider and died three days later. This was the 13th recorded victim of Sydney funnel-web spider bites. Later that year, Sutherland's team produced an effective antivenom; since then, no deaths have been recorded from Sydney funnel-web spider bites. The antivenom had its first success when it was used to treat a 49-year-old Sydney man, Gordon Wheatley, who was bitten by a Sydney funnel-web spider on 31 January 1981. He completely recovered after 2 days in hospital.

Dr Sutherland also led research into snakebite treatment, working on antivenoms and developing venom detection kits to help hospital staff determine appropriate treatment for a bite.

== Later years ==
In 1994, CSL was privatised and the antivenom research program was closed, prompting Sutherland to leave the organisation for the University of Melbourne. Here he founded the Australian Venom Research Unit, where he worked until 1999 when striatonigral degeneration, a condition similar to Parkinson's disease, forced him to retire. Even in retirement he continued to work, co-authoring three books, including "Venomous Creatures of Australia", which became its publisher's (Oxford University Press) best-selling Australian book.

== Personal life ==
Sutherland was married three times.

=== Media appearances and autobiography ===
Sutherland had a humorous interview with Douglas Adams and Mark Carwardine in Last Chance to See.

Sutherland's autobiography, A Venomous Life, was published in 1998 by Highland House Publishing, Melbourne (ISBN 1-86447-026-7). He also wrote Hydroponics for Everyone, about one of his hobbies.

=== Death ===
When he died in 2002, he had already written his own death notice: "Struan would like to inform his friends and acquaintances that he fell off his perch on Friday, 11 January 2002, and is to be privately cremated. No flowers please. Donations to Australian Venom Research Unit, Melbourne University."

== Honours ==
In the Australia Day honours of 2002, two weeks after his death, Sutherland was appointed an Officer of the Order of Australia (AO), effective from 7 February 2000, for "service to science as a leading contributor to research in clinical toxicology and the biology of Australia's venomous creatures, and for the development of the funnel web spider antivenom".

== Sources ==
- Struan K Sutherland, A Venomous Life: the Autobiography of Professor Struan Sutherland (Melbourne: Hyland House, 1998).
- Mark Whitaker, Spiderman, Weekend Australian Magazine, 13–14 March 1999.
