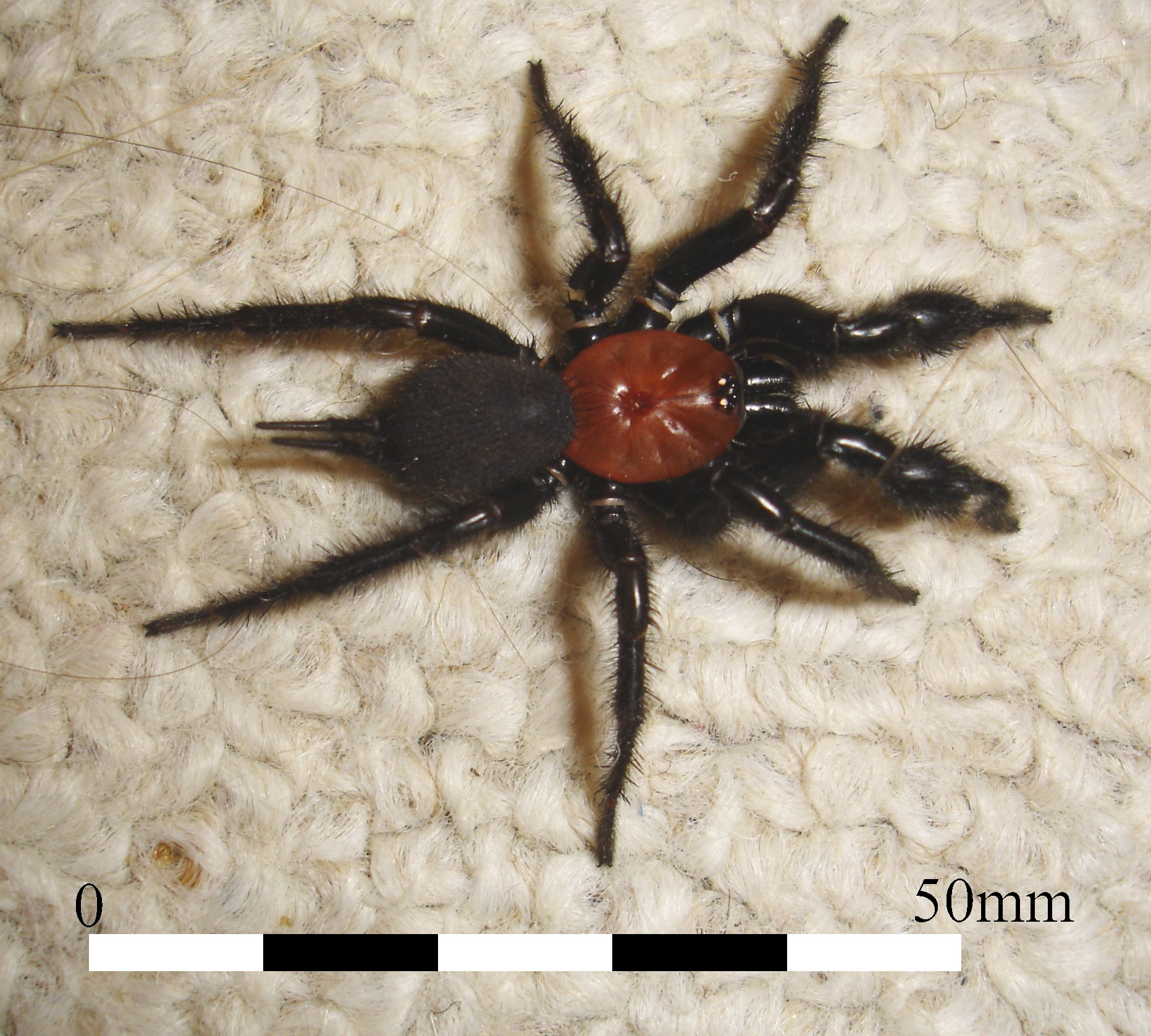

Conservation status
- Not Threatened (NZ TCS)

Scientific classification
- Kingdom: Animalia
- Phylum: Arthropoda
- Subphylum: Chelicerata
- Class: Arachnida
- Order: Araneae
- Infraorder: Mygalomorphae
- Family: Porrhothelidae
- Genus: Porrhothele
- Species: P. antipodiana

Binomial name
- Porrhothele antipodiana (Walckenaer, 1837)

Synonyms
- Mygale antipodiana Walckenaer,1837; Mygale quoyi Lucas,1849; Mygale antipodum White,1849; Mygale hexops White,1849; Hexops whitei Ausserer,1871; Macrothele huttonii O.Pickard-Cambridge,1873; Macrothele insignipes Simon,1891; Nemesia kirkii Urquhart,1894; Arbanitis kirkii Hogg,1918; Porrhothele simoni Hogg,1901; Porrhothele avocae Todd,1945

= Porrhothele antipodiana =

Black tunnelweb spider from New Zealand

Porrhothele antipodiana, the black tunnelweb spider, is a species of mygalomorph spider that lives in New Zealand. It is the most common and widespread of several species in the genus Porrhothele, and is especially common in the greater Wellington region where the vagrant mature males are often encountered in or around dwellings. This species is one of New Zealand's most studied spiders. In New Zealand, the common name "tunnelweb spider" is also often used to refer to members of the genus Hexathele. Neither should be confused with their distant relatives, the highly-venomous Australian funnel-web spiders (family Atracidae).

== Description ==
In females, the carapace is usually orange-brown coloured, with some darker shading near the eyes. The legs and palps are also typically orange-brown, but are darker than the carapace. The chelicerae are reddish-brown to black. The sternum is a pale reddish brown. The abdomen is a uniform purple black colour and may have faint chevron patterns, more noticeable in juveniles. The opening of the two pairs of book lungs are ringed with cream. Females are the larger of the two sexes. Body size is variable, but can exceed 30 mm.

In males, the carapace is often darker than in females. The legs and palps are a dark reddish brown. The chelicerae are also dark reddish brown and sometimes black. The abdomen is also darkly coloured, similar to that of females. Males can be distinguished from females by the presence of clasping structures in the first pair of legs which are used to hold females during copulation.

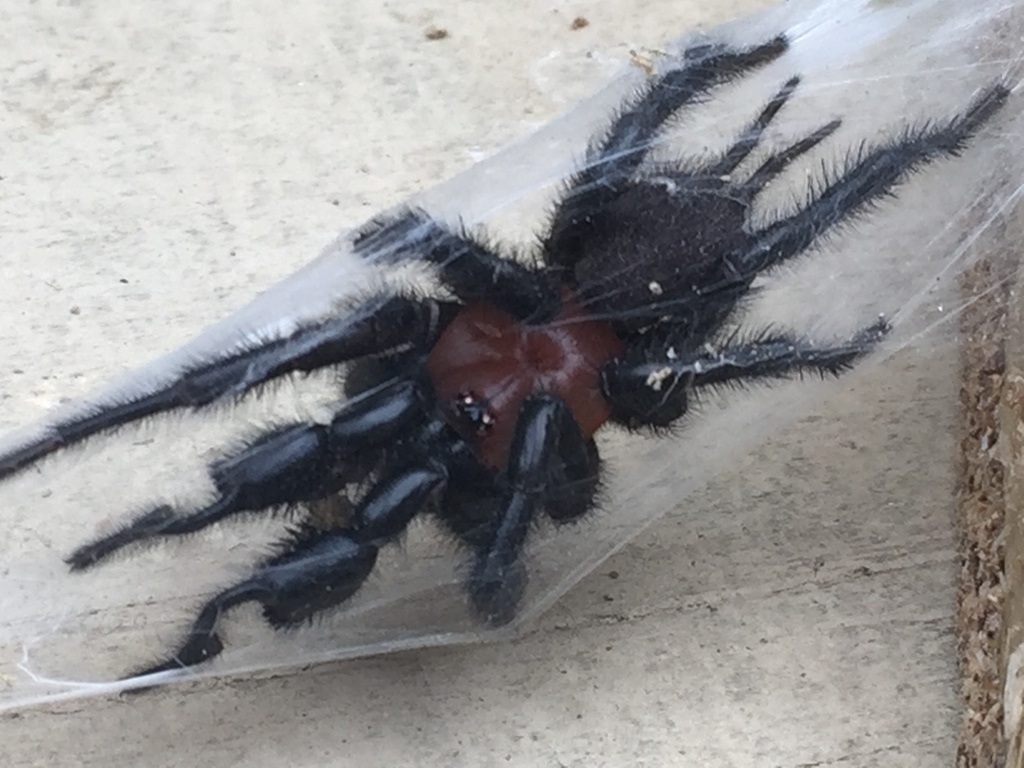
Adult male Porrhothele antipodiana; note the modified first leg segments

Porrhothele antipodiana is often confused with species from the genus Hexathele, which occupies similar habitat and builds similar webs. They can be most easily differentiated by the number of spinnerets: Porrhothele has two pairs of spinnerets, whereas Hexathele has three pairs.

As the common name suggests, these spiders construct non-sticky long tunnel-shaped webs, often under logs and rocks, but they will also construct their webs in the trunks of trees, in rock faces and in urban structures. Tunnels may be up to 25 cm long and 3-4 cm wide, often with just a single opening where silk is widely spread out to catch and alert the spiders to the presence of prey. Webs for tunnels can be spun as quickly as within one hour.

== Taxonomy ==
Porrhothele antipodiana was first described in 1837 by Charles Athanase Walckenaer, a French entomologist and arachnologist who described a specimen from New Zealand as Mygale antipodiana. This was one of the earliest descriptions of a species of spider in New Zealand. In 1849, Adam White described two species of Mygale (Ctenzia) that were endemic to New Zealand. These were Mygale (Ctenzia) antipodium and Mygale (Ctenzia) hexops. White noted that Mygale hexops had only six eyes, rather than eight, which is typical for Porrhothele antipodiana. It is not known if this is a mistake or not. In the same year, Mygale quoyi was described by Hippolyte Lucas, named after the collector of the specimen used for description. In 1871 Mygale (Ctenzia) hexops was moved to the Hexops genus and subsequently named “Hexops whitei” by Anton Ausserer. The creation of this genus was done on the basis that Mygale (Ctenzia) hexops was described as having only six eyes, which is unique among other specimens of Mygalomorphae in the area. In 1873, Reverend Octavius Pickard-Cambridge described a new species found in Wellington from the recently described Macrothele genus, and named this species Macrothele huttoni. In 1891, Eugène Simon recognized Mygale quoyi as a synonym of Mygale antipodiana and also described both male and female specimens of a new species named "Macrothele insignipes". However, a year later, Simon created a new genus for Mygale antipodiana, so the species became Porrhothele antipodiana. In addition to this, Simon recognized Macrothele insignipes as a synonym of Porrhothele antipodiana.

In 1894, Arthur Urquhart described a new species in the genus Nemesia (a member of the trapdoor spider family), he named this species "Nemesia kirkii" after the collector of this specimen. In 1901, Henry Hogg provided another description of Porrhothele, and distinguished it from Macrothele on the basis of the lack of spines on the tarsi and much stouter front legs. On this basis, Hogg recognized that Macrothele huttoni was actually an immature Porrhothele antipodiana and thus had Macrothele huttoni recognized as a synonym. In his description, Hogg also described Porrhothele simoni, a species that would later be recognized as another synonym of P. antipodiana. Hogg also moved Nemesia kirkii into the newly formed Arbanitis genus.

In 1945, Valerie Todd Davies provided another description of Porrhothele antipodiana but also suggested that Porrhothele simoni should be considered a synonym of P. antipodiana. P. simoni was originally distinguished by the colour of the thorax, space in between fore median eyes and curvature of the fovea. Davies argued that space between eyes can vary with age and that thorax colour is very variable, so the only distinguishing feature to consider is the curvature of the fovea, which would put the validity of this species into question. Davies also described a new species of Porrhothele, named Porrhothele avocae, which was described only from species found at Mount Arthur Pass.

In 1968, P. antipodiana was given an updated description by Raymond Forster and P. avocae was recognized as a synonym of P. antipodiana. Forster also suggested that P. antipodiana may actually represent many morphologically very similar (i.e. cryptic) species that have not yet been described. As with most spiders, accurate species-level identification requires examination of the mature genitalic structures (the epigyne in females, and the palpal bulb in males).

== Distribution and habitat ==
Porrhothele antipodiana is the most widespread species of Porrhothele and is found throughout both main islands of New Zealand. In the North Island, it appears to be excluded from the Northland region (where Porrhothele quadrigyna is known to be distributed). It seems to be broadly distributed in the South Island, except for in the alpine zone. P. antipodiana is also known to occur in the Chatham Islands, but this is thought to be a recent human-mediated introduction.

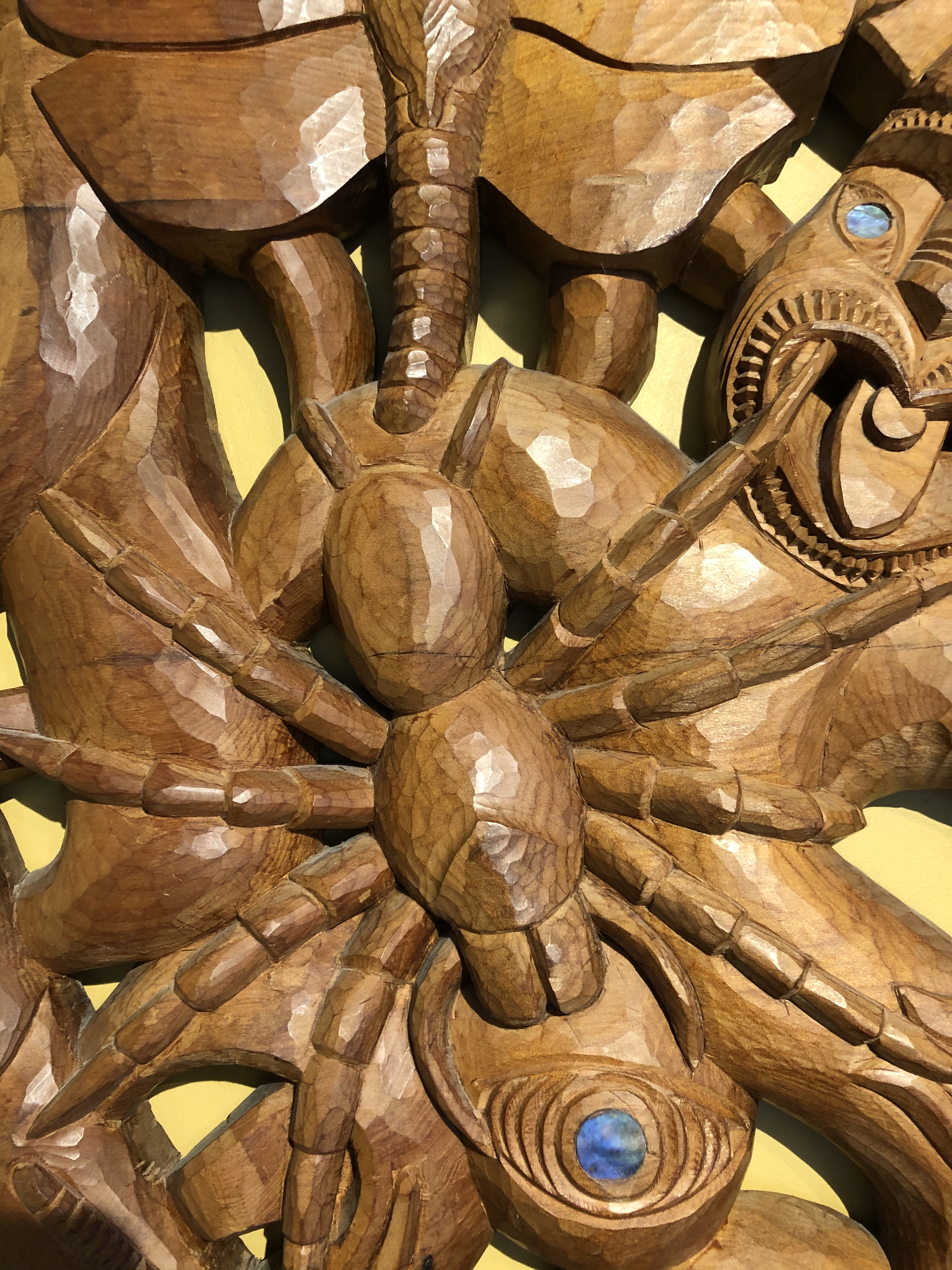
Tunnelweb Spider carved on pare on display at the New Zealand Arthropod Collection at Landcare Research, Auckland

Porrhothele antipodiana occupies a variety of habitats. They are typically found under old logs and rocks but will also set up webs in cliffs and rock faces where possible. They typically occur in forests, but are also known to occur in sand dunes, gardens and hillsides with clusters of rocks.

== Life history ==
When laid, eggs are loosely packed together in cocoons which have two thin layers of silk. Eggsac construction occurs from late October to mid-December (during the summer). Estimates of the number of eggs in their eggsacs range from 100 to 300. Eggs may take up to 30 days to hatch after laying (this seems to occur when the spiderlings reach 2-3mm in length), with the spiderlings moulting for the first time a few days later. The spiderlings remain within the female's nest until they develop further. During the first instar period, the spiders are inactive and lay on their backs stretching their limbs, then moulting after five weeks. The second instar spiders are more active and begin spinning webs and feeding. The spiderling tends to grow to a length of 12mm by the end of the first year. After 2-3 years, the spider reaches maturity. When at maturity, the spider will continue to sporadically moult.P. antipodiana is relatively long lived and is known to live for at least six years.

== Behavior ==
=== Courtship and copulation ===
As the male approaches the female's web platform, the front pair of legs are raised, which aims the modified metatarsus and tibia (claspers) at the female. The cephalothorax is also aimed upwards, revealing his fangs and palps. The front pair of legs are used to vibrate the web as the male moves forwards toward the female. The male then uses his claspers to clasp the female's two palps, which causes the female to enter a passive state. The male then pushes the limp female in a position where the cephalothorax of the male is perpendicular to the underside of the female's cephalothorax. If on the web, the female may also lay on her back. The male then copulates with the female by injecting sperm into the female reproductive tract using one palp at a time. Copulation concludes when the male (whilst still clasping the female) disengages and then pushes the female away. During courtship and copulation, males spin silk.

== Prey ==
Like almost all spiders, Porrhothele antipodiana is an obligate carnivore. The remains of the captured prey end up spread throughout the web, so it can be easy to identify what the spider has been feeding on. These spiders seem to feed on almost anything that happens to come close enough to its web, so its prey may simply reflect what species happen to be present in the area. A small selection of prey that have been preyed upon by P. antipodiana includes isopods (Porcellio scaber), bumblebees, beetles such as Holcaspis (Carabidae) and Xylotoles (Cerambycidae), and other spiders such as Dolomedes (Pisauridae).

One of the most unusual prey species of P. antipodiana is the snail Cornu aspersum (which is exotic to New Zealand). This is quite a difficult prey for most spiders to catch since they have a hard shell they can retreat into and slime that can be produced. To kill the snails, P. antipodiana first detects and embeds its fangs into the flesh of the snail. The spider then attempts to keep its fangs embedded as the snail retracts into its shell. While attached, the snail begins to produce abundant amounts of foam in an attempt to deter the spider. Although the snails appear to be resistant to the venom of the spider, they eventually die after about 30 minutes. The spider may then spend many hours feeding on the snail.

Another notable prey item is the wasp Vespula germanica, another exotic species in New Zealand. The aggressive behavior of this species could be expected to make it difficult for a P. antipodiana to safely capture. Once the wasp becomes entangled in web, the spider grabs the wasp from behind the thorax (to avoid the stinger) and then kills it.

== Natural predators ==
Porrhothele antipodiana is known to be preyed upon by the North Island brown kiwi.

== Parasites ==
Porrhothele antipodiana is known to be parasitized by Aranimermis giganteus, a nematode that parasitizes the Mygalomorphae of New Zealand. Individuals infected with the parasite seem to become attracted to water, which inevitably causes them to drown, allowing the A. giganteus to complete the aquatic stage of its life cycle.

== Interactions with spider-hunting wasps ==
A considerable source of mortality in these spiders can be attributed to spider-hunting wasps, especially Priocnemis monachus. These wasps are specialized for hunting large spiders, which they paralyze and lay eggs in, which then hatch and consume the spiders' body.

Once these wasps locate the spider's burrow, they enter and corner the spider. The spider will then rear up into a defensive posture, but the spider is usually stung several times during the struggle and is paralyzed. Since the spider is much larger than the wasp, it has to be dragged backwards towards the wasps nest. Once placed in the nest, an egg is laid on the spider and this eventually hatches and feeds on the spider.

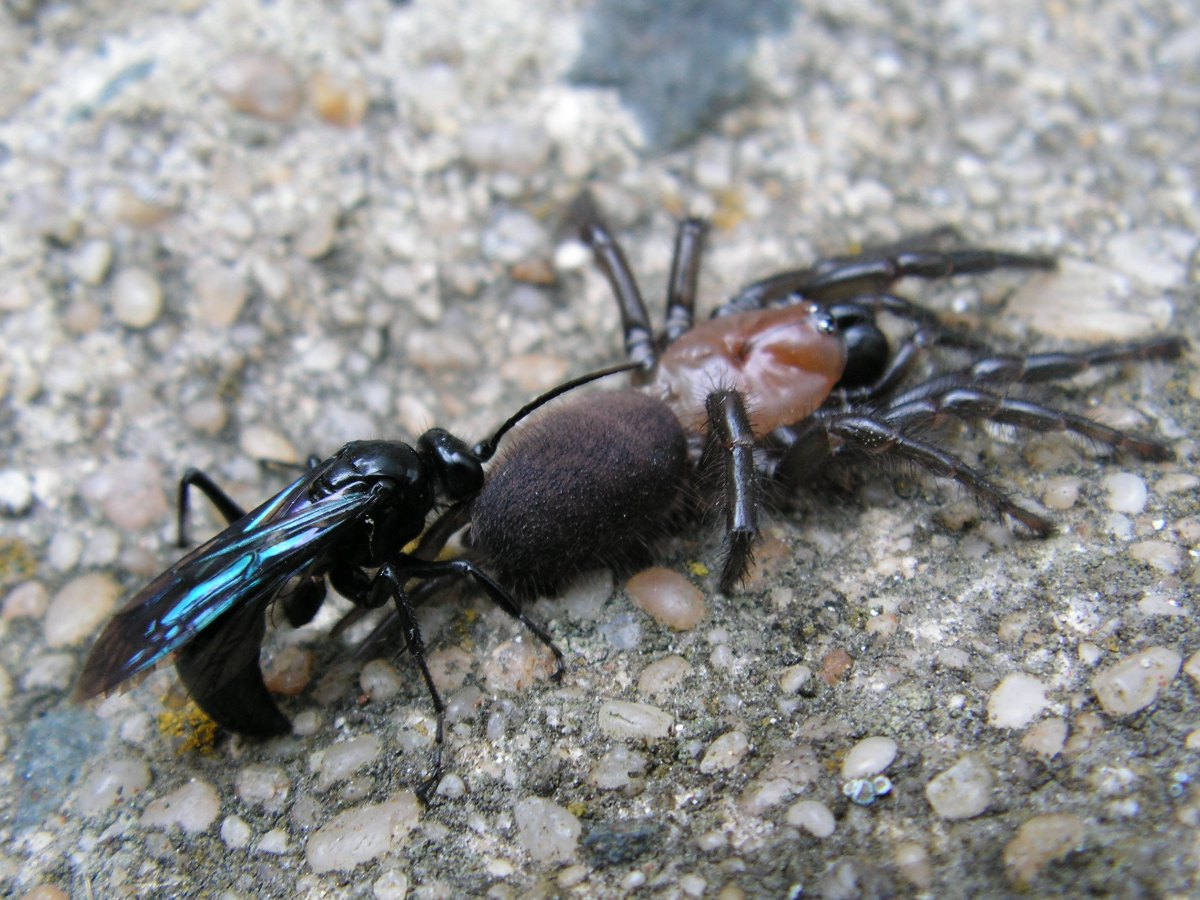
Priocnemis monachus dragging a paralyzed Porrhothele antipodiana

== Interactions with mice ==
New Zealand is home to many invasive mammalian species, including mice. In its regular habitat, Porrhothele antipodiana is likely to be encountered by mice and other introduced mammals, and could be potential prey. P. antipodiana placed into containers with mice assumed a defense threat posture when investigated by the mice. The mice would then attack with "a series of quick, darting rushes, nipping at the outstretched legs of the spider". During this, the spider would strike at the mice, but the mice would generally avoid these strikes. As this continued, the spider would tire when pieces of leg were ripped off, which caused body fluid to spill out, which led to the spider dying. The mice would then proceed to eat the abdomen and cephalothorax of the spider. However, in some encounters, the spiders would catch hold of the mouse and bite it, causing it to lose orientation, shiver, and ultimately die. Mice that survived bites would later avoid attacking these spiders.

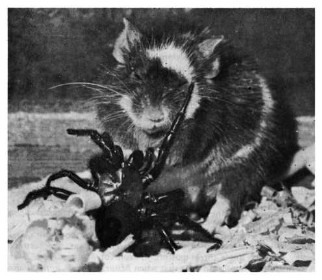
Porrhothele antipodiana fighting a mouse

== Interactions with humans ==
Porrhothele antipodiana may bite a human if it feels threatened. Since these spiders may occupy gardens, an encounter with an unaware human may occur and a bite may happen, although this is rare. Bites are painful and may cause localized swelling, itching, or numbness. Bites may leave two small punctures in the skin. There is only one known case of serious symptoms occurring, which were likely to be due to secondary infection. Victims are advised to disinfect the area to reduce the risk of infection. The venom is not dangerous to humans.

== Conservation status ==
Under the New Zealand Threat Classification System, this species is listed as "Not threatened".

== In Māori culture ==
It has been suggested that the word "kahuwai", which refers to an unidentified species of spider in Māori literature, refers to Porrhothele antipodiana.

== In popular culture ==
This spider was described by director Peter Jackson as the inspiration for his depiction of Shelob in his The Lord of the Rings film adaptation.

== Gallery ==
Porrhothele antipodiana

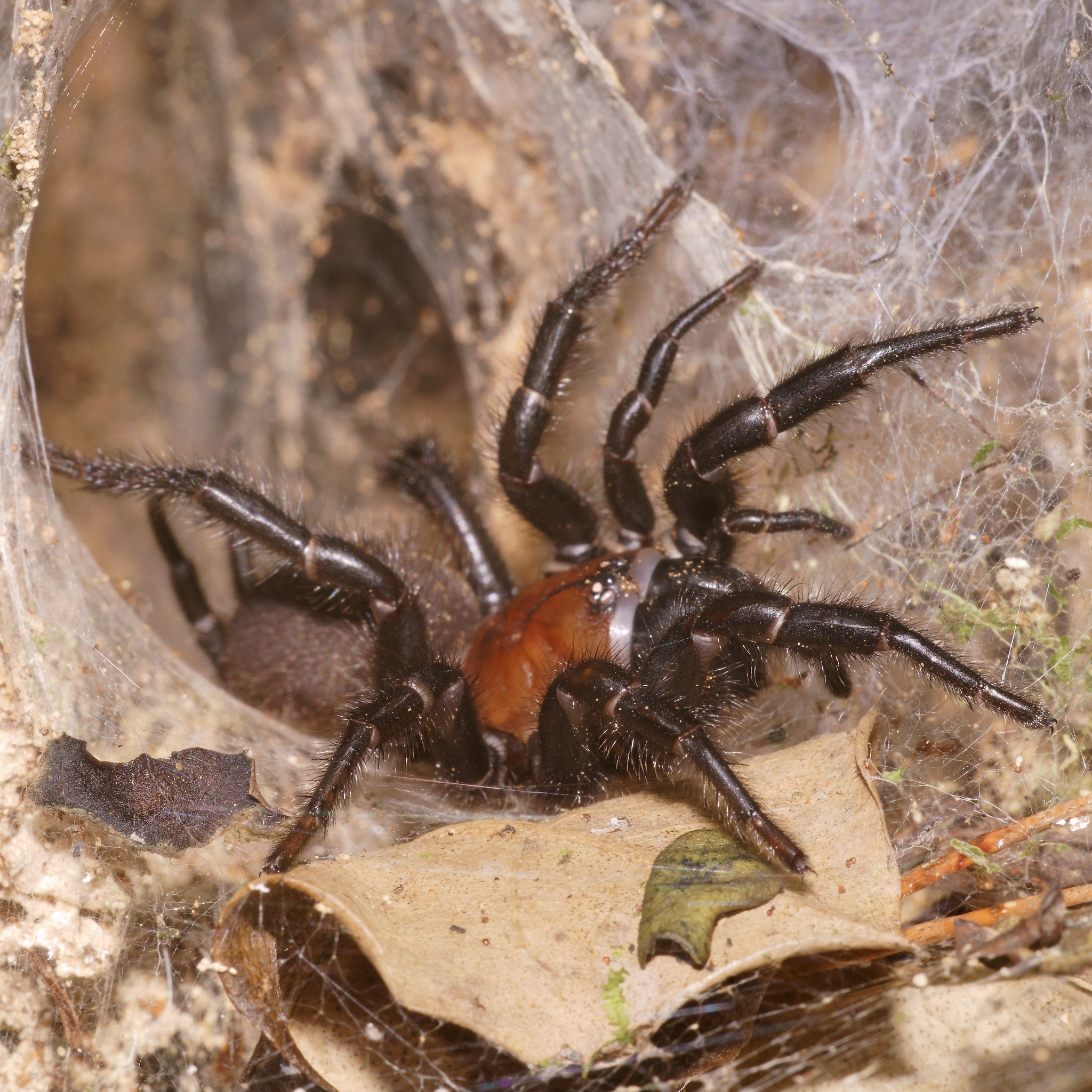

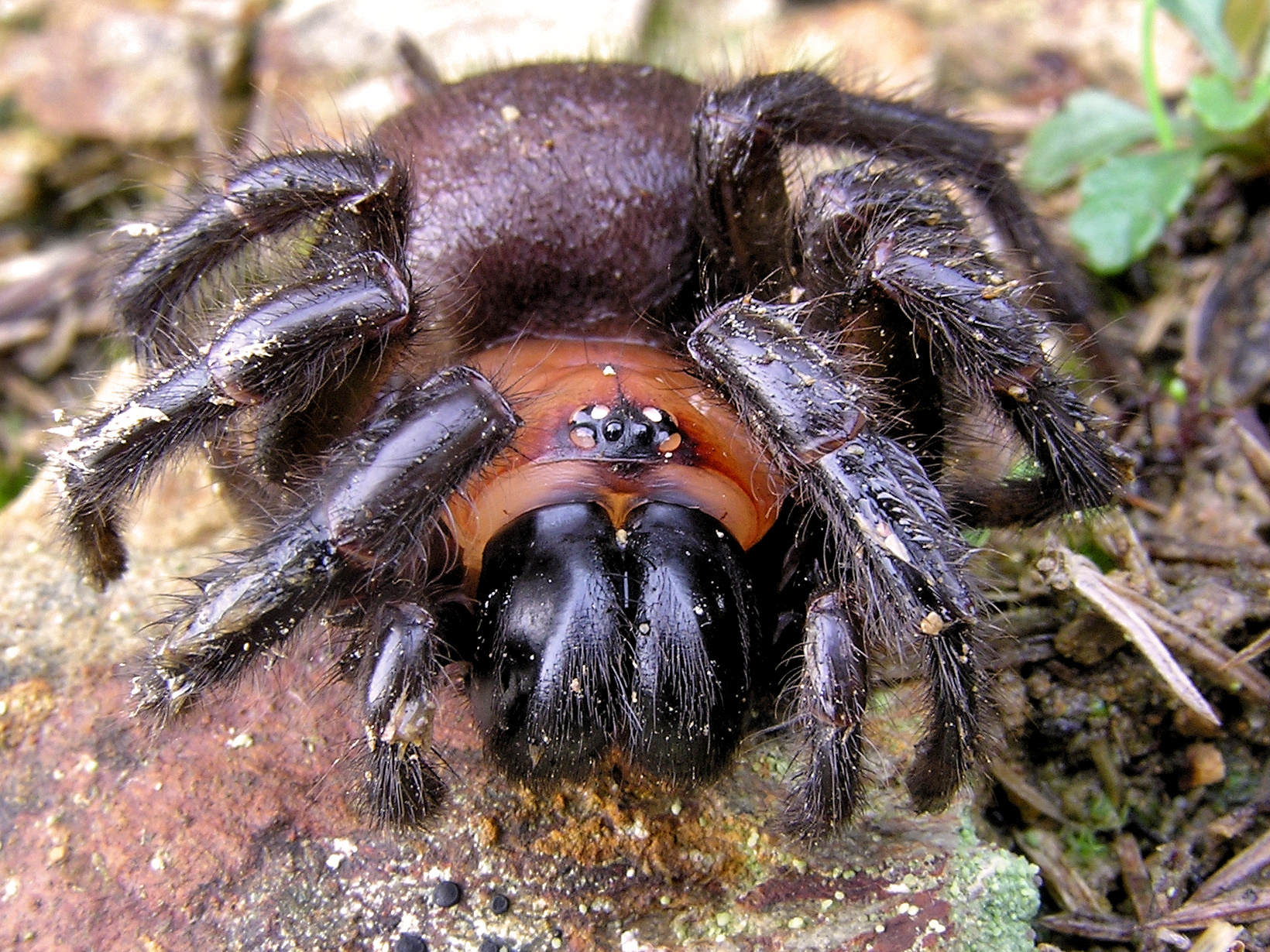

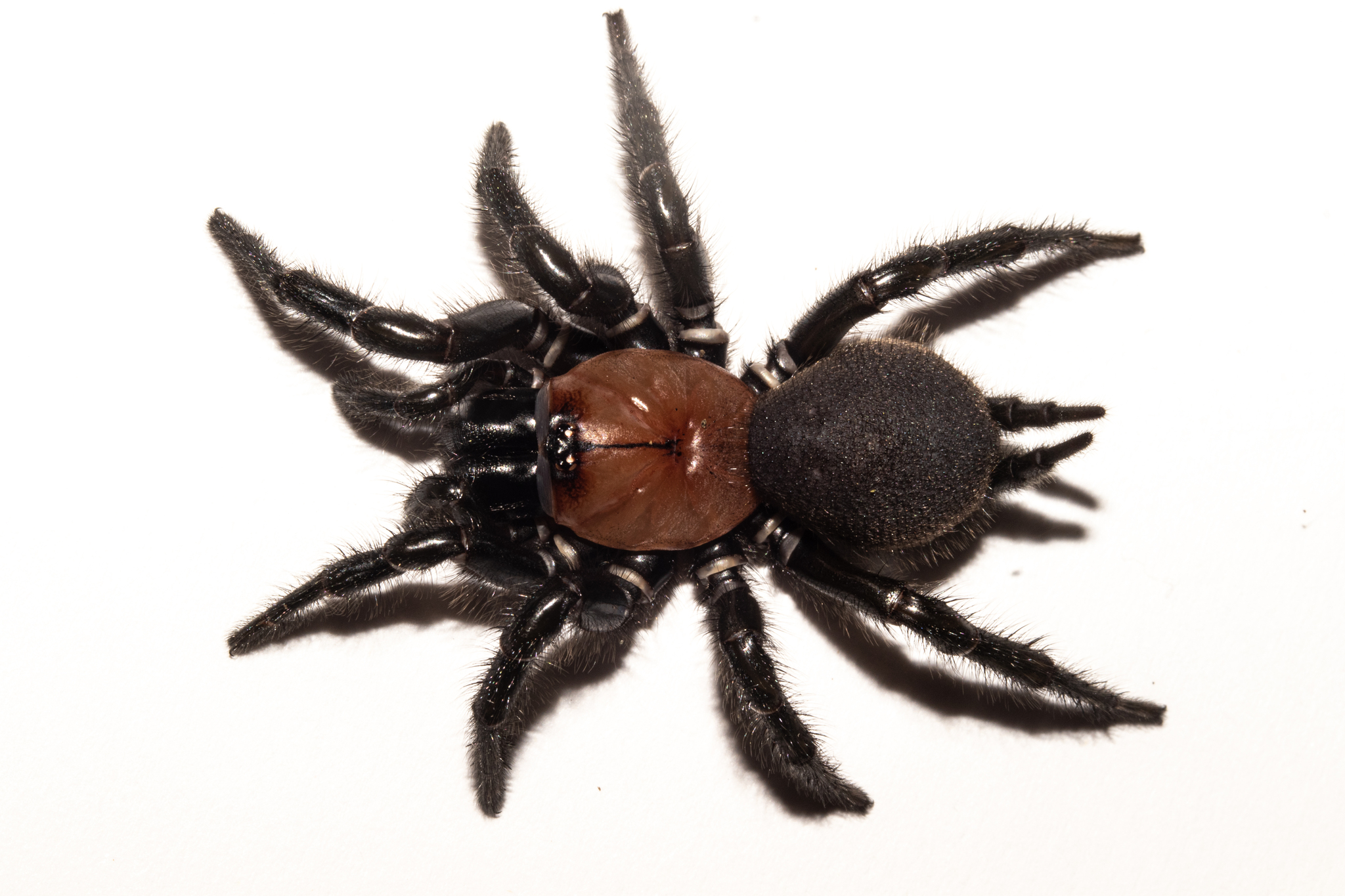

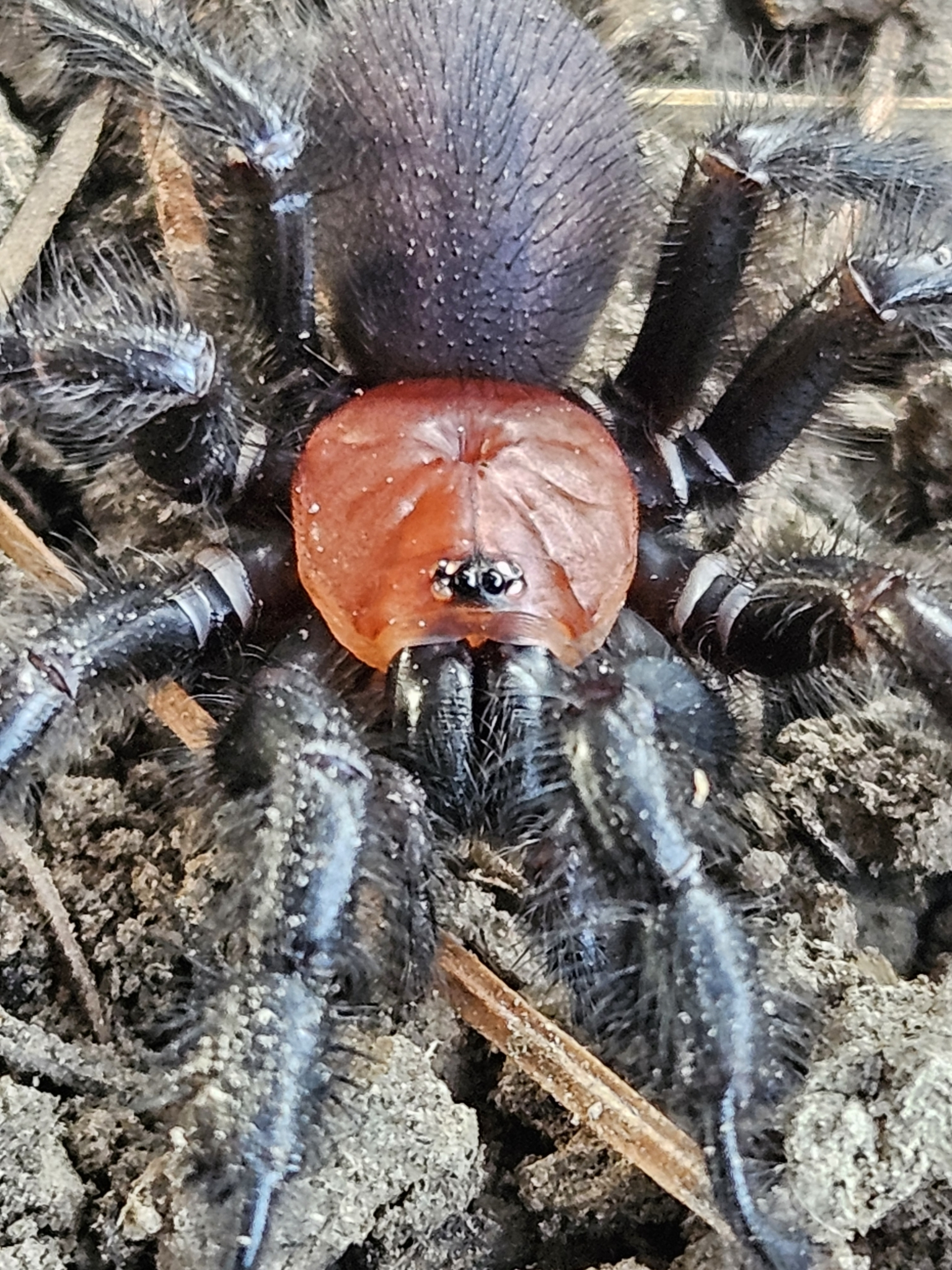

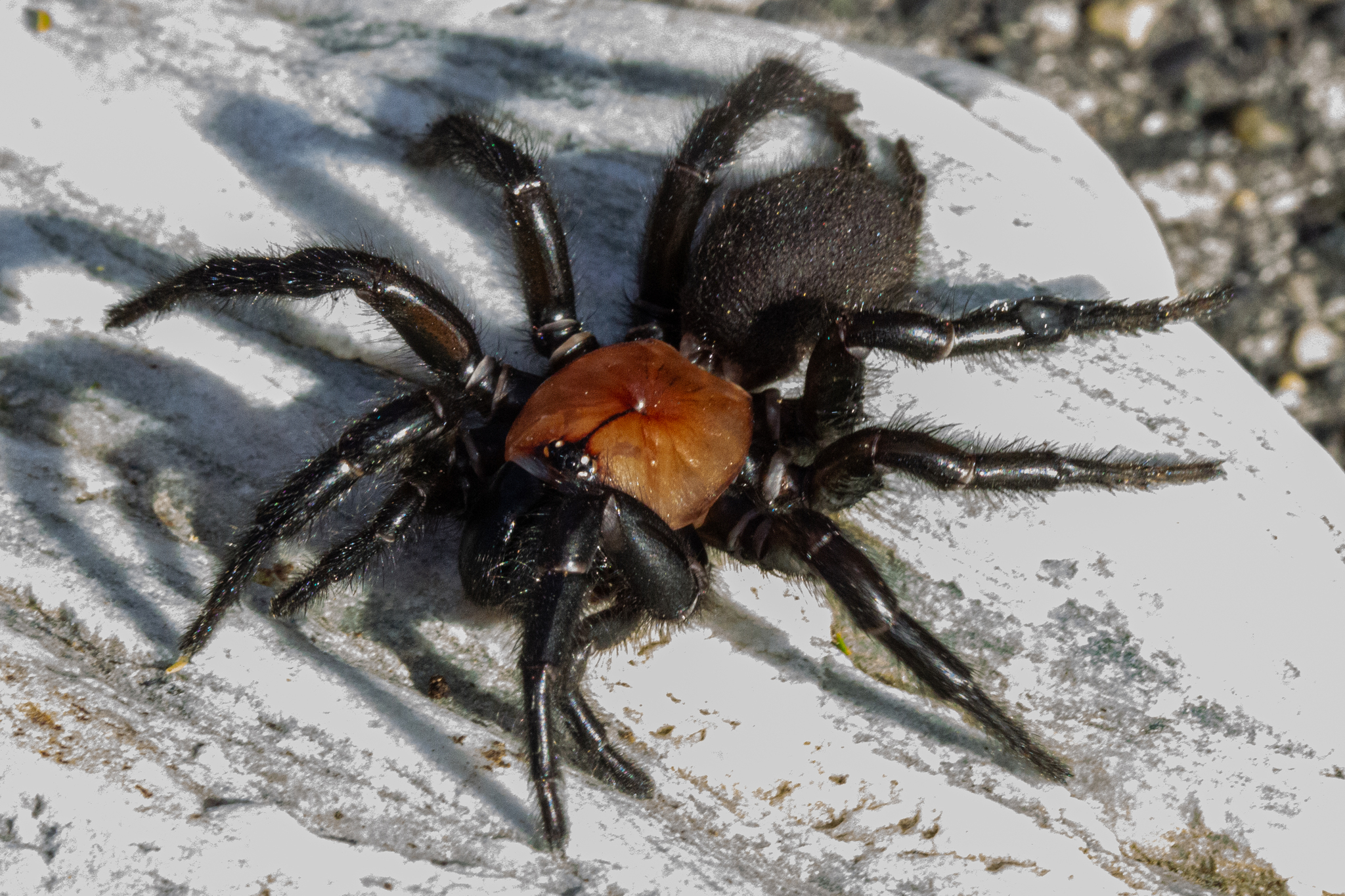
