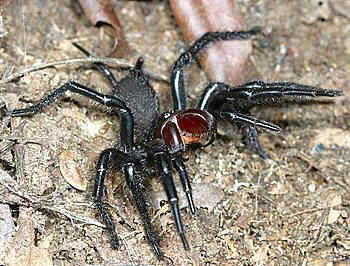
- Threatening female Macrothele gigas

Scientific classification
- Kingdom: Animalia
- Phylum: Arthropoda
- Subphylum: Chelicerata
- Class: Arachnida
- Order: Araneae
- Infraorder: Mygalomorphae
- Family: Macrothelidae
- Genus: Macrothele; Ausserer, 1871

Type species
- M. calpeiana (Walckenaer, 1805)

Species
- 19, see text

Synonyms
- Orientothele Mirza, Sanap & Kunte, 2017

= Macrothele =

Genus of spiders

Macrothele is a genus of mygalomorph spiders in the family Macrothelidae, and was first described by A. Ausserer in 1871. Most of the species in the genus occur in Asia, from India to Japan, and Java, with two found in Africa, and two in Europe. The name is derived from Ancient Greek μακρός ("makro-"), meaning "big", and θηλή ("thele"), referring to the spinnerets.

== Description ==
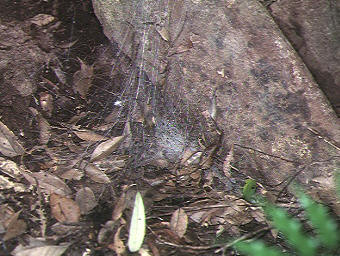
Nest of M. gigas

Spiders of this genus are fairly large, with females of some Chinese species ranging from 1 to 3 centimetres (0.4 to 1.2 in) in body length. Males are smaller, sometimes only half that length. Macrothelids can be distinguished from other mygalomorph spiders by their larger posterior sigillae on the sternum, and the arrangement of the rows of teeth on the margin of the chelicerae: larger front-facing margin and smaller rear-facing.

These spiders build tube-webs or funnel-webs under rocks or logs, or in crevices in the ground.

== Taxonomy ==
The genus Macrothele was erected by Anton Ausserer in 1871, with the type species being Macrothele calpeiana, formerly Mygale calpeiana. Ausserer placed the genus in the then very broadly defined family Theraphosidae. It was later placed in the Dipluridae and the Hexathelidae before being transferred to the Macrothelidae in 2018. A molecular phylogenetic study in 2018 suggested that Macrothele was a distinct, early diverging lineage within the Mygalomorphae. Accordingly, Simon's subfamily Macrothelinae was elevated to the family Macrothelidae. There is some doubt if the western and eastern species should be grouped in the same genus.

The following cladogram shows the possible relationship of Macrothele to related taxa:

- - Dipluridae
  - - Hexathelidae
    - - Porrhothelidae
      - - Macrothele (Macrothelidae)
        - - - Calisoga (Nemesiidae)
            - Hebestatis (Halonoproctidae)
          - - Atracidae
            - Actinopodidae

=== Species ===
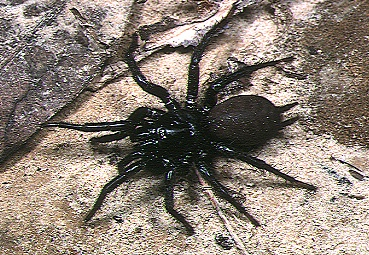
Female M. yaginumai

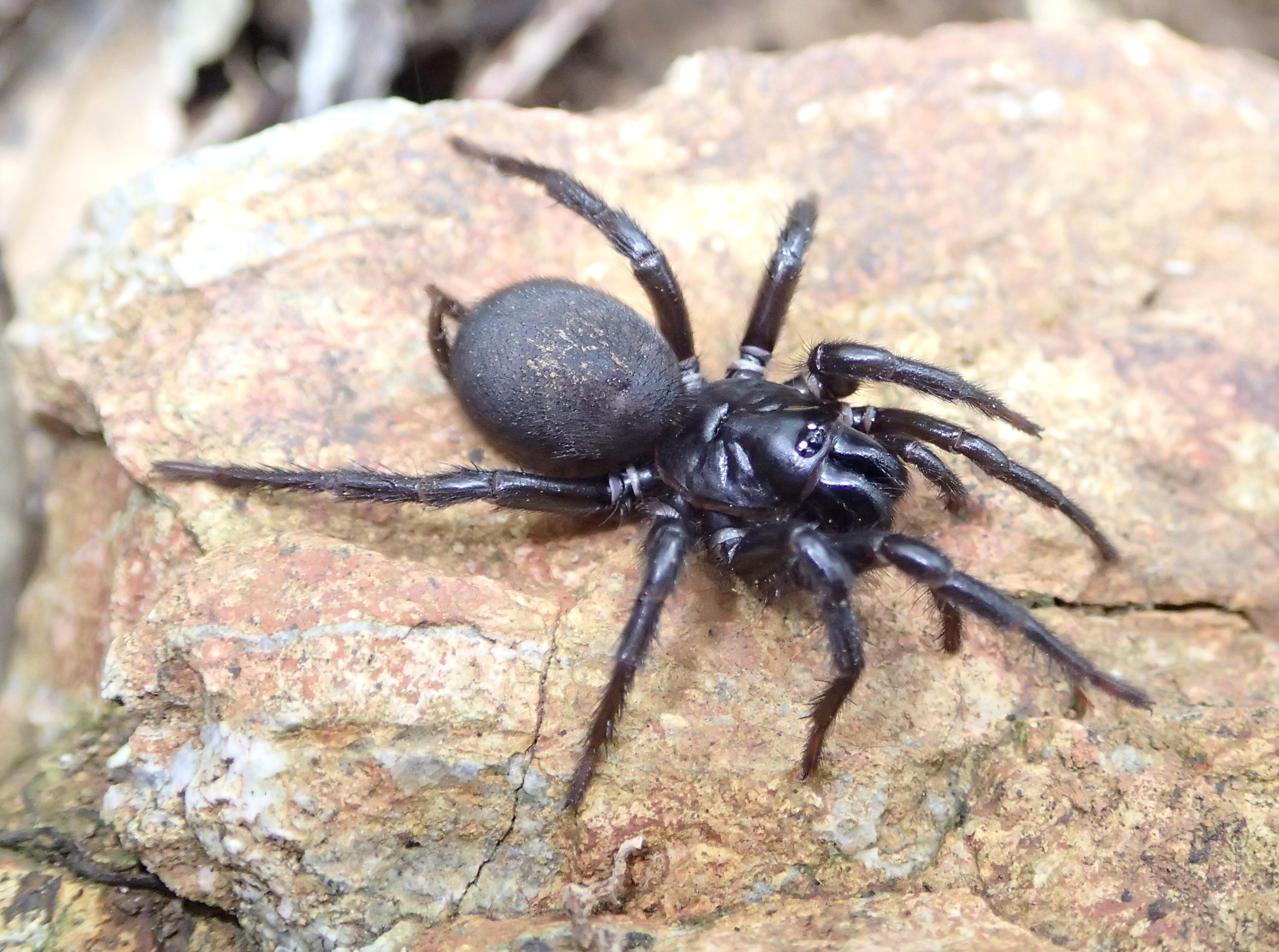
Female M. amamiensis

As of January 2026, this genus includes nineteen species and one subspecies:

- Macrothele arcuata Tang, Zhao & Yang, 2020 – China
- Macrothele auriculata Zhang, Wu, Zhao & Yang, 2024 – China
- Macrothele calpeiana (Walckenaer, 1805) – Portugal, Spain, Morocco, Algeria
- Macrothele camerunensis Simon, 1903 – Cameroon, Equatorial Guinea
- Macrothele cangshanensis Z. B. Yang, Zhao, Zhang & Z. Z. Yang, 2018 – China
- Macrothele cretica Kulczyński, 1903 – Greece (Crete)
- Macrothele decemnotata Simon, 1909 – Vietnam
- Macrothele drolshageni Özkütük, Elverici, Yağmur & Kunt, 2019 – Turkey
- Macrothele indicola (Tikader, 1969) – India
- Macrothele maculata (Thorell, 1890) – Myanmar, Indonesia (Sumatra, Java)
  - M. m. annamensis Hogg, 1922 – Vietnam
- Macrothele multispine Wang, Li & Yang, 2019 – China
- Macrothele nullispine Zhang, Wu, Zhao & Yang, 2024 – China
- Macrothele proserpina Simon, 1909 – Vietnam
- Macrothele segmentata Simon, 1892 – Malaysia
- Macrothele simplicata (Saito, 1933) – Taiwan
- Macrothele triangularis Benoit, 1965 – DR Congo
- Macrothele vidua Simon, 1906 – India
- Macrothele yongshengensis Z. B. Yang, Zhao & Z. Z. Yang, 2019 – China
- Macrothele yunlingensis Z. B. Yang, Zhao & Z. Z. Yang, 2019 – China

Several species were moved to new genera:

- Bannathele Shao, Zhou & Lin, 2025 – China
- Gigathele Shao, Zhou & Lin, 2025 – China, Japan, Taiwan
- Microthele Shao, Zhou & Lin, 2025 – China
- Orientothele Mirza, Sanap & Kunte, 2017 – China, India
- Spinathele Shao, Zhou & Lin, 2025 – China, Taiwan, Laos
- Vacrothele Tang & Yang, 2022 – China, Japan, Taiwan, Hong Kong

== See also ==
- Raventoxin
