= Funnelweb =

Funnelweb or funnel-web may refer to:

- Funnel-web spider, several different species
- FunnelWeb, a literate programming environment
- The FunnelWeb spectroscopic survey of southern hemisphere stars, underway at the UK Schmidt Telescope
