= Hololena santana =

Scientific classification
- Kingdom: Animalia
- Phylum: Arthropoda
- Subphylum: Chelicerata
- Class: Arachnida
- Order: Araneae
- Infraorder: Araneomorphae
- Family: Agelenidae
- Genus: Hololena
- Species: H. santana

Binomial name
- Hololena santana Chamberlin & Ivie, 1942

Species of spider

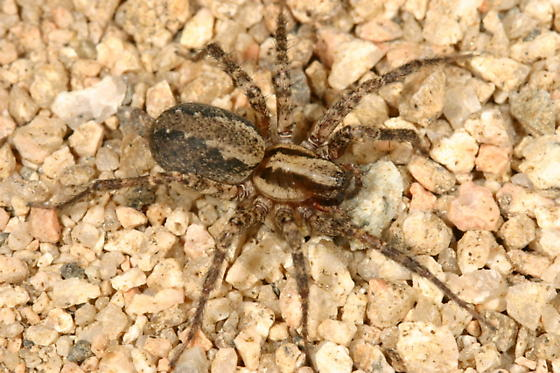

Hololena santana is a species of funnel weaver in the family of spiders known as Agelenidae. It is found in the United States.
