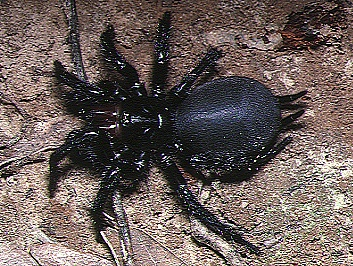
- Female Gigathele gigas
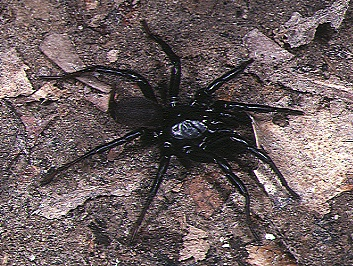
- Male Gigathele gigas

Scientific classification
- Kingdom: Animalia
- Phylum: Arthropoda
- Subphylum: Chelicerata
- Class: Arachnida
- Order: Araneae
- Infraorder: Mygalomorphae
- Family: Macrothelidae
- Genus: Gigathele
- Species: G. gigas

Binomial name
- Gigathele gigas Shimojana & Haupt, 1998

= Giant Japanese funnel-web spider =

Species of spider

The Giant Japanese funnel-web spider, known formally as Gigathele gigas, is a species of funnel-web spider in the family Macrothelidae. It is one of the largest funnel-web spiders in the world, and is highly venomous. The species was previously assigned to genus Macrothele, but was assigned to Gigathele in 2025.

== Description ==
Members of the species are typically black with red fangs protruding from the mouth. When fully grown, spiders in the species can grow to have a leg span of ~6 inches (15 cm), making them one of the largest funnel-web spider species in the world. The spider is exclusive to the Ryukyu Islands in Japan.

== Venom ==
The spider is venomous, and typical symptoms after a bite can include unnatural amounts of perspiration, goose bumps, hypertension and tachycardia.
