= Macrothele cretica =

Conservation status
- Vulnerable (IUCN 2.3)

Scientific classification
- Kingdom: Animalia
- Phylum: Arthropoda
- Subphylum: Chelicerata
- Class: Arachnida
- Order: Araneae
- Infraorder: Mygalomorphae
- Family: Macrothelidae
- Genus: Macrothele
- Species: M. cretica

Binomial name
- Macrothele cretica Kulczyński, 1903

Species of spider

Macrothele cretica is a species of spiders in the family Macrothelidae. It is endemic to Greece.
