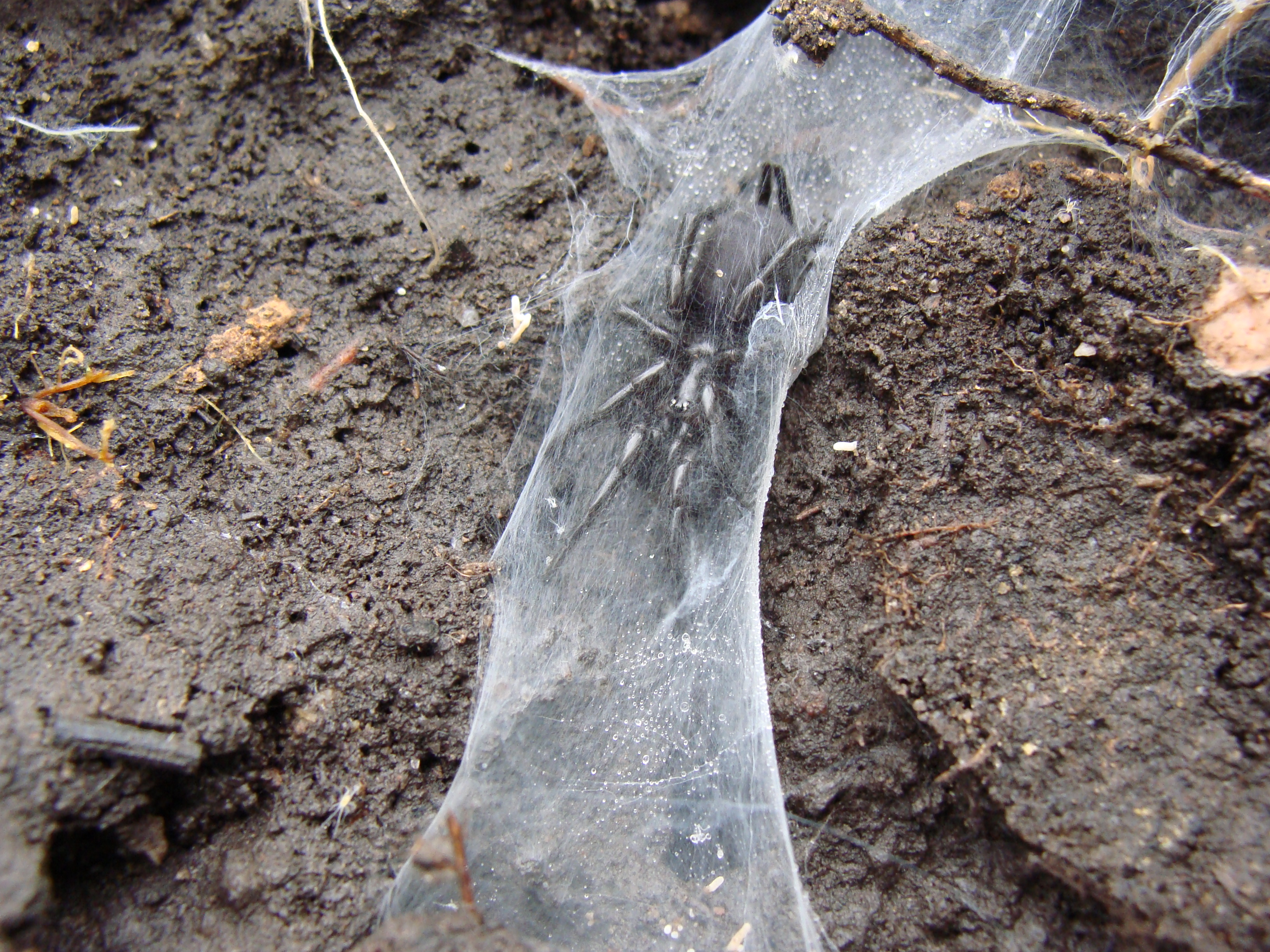

Scientific classification
- Kingdom: Animalia
- Phylum: Arthropoda
- Subphylum: Chelicerata
- Class: Arachnida
- Order: Araneae
- Infraorder: Mygalomorphae
- Family: Macrothelidae
- Genus: Macrothele
- Species: M. calpeiana

Binomial name
- Macrothele calpeiana (Walckenaer, 1805)

= Macrothele calpeiana =

Funnel-web spider from Spain and surrounds

Macrothele calpeiana, commonly known as the Gibraltar funnel-web spider or Spanish funnel-web spider, is one of the largest spiders in Europe. Macrothele calpeiana is the only spider species protected under European Union legislation.

The satin black colour and long, flexible spinnerets are characteristic of this spider. The carapace is low and flat and the eyes are in a compact group. The female resembles the male but has a larger abdomen. The male can grow to nearly 30 millimetres (1.2 in) long; females are typically larger. Like all funnel-web spiders, this spider's web is funnel-shaped with trip-threads around the entrance, built among stones and roots. Its geographical range includes Spain, Portugal and Gibraltar. It also can be found in north-west Africa and Italy where it is believed that it arrived through the olive tree trade with the Iberian Peninsula. This species has been observed occasionally in France. The venom is not deadly to humans.

It is the type species of its genus.
