= Macrothele raveni =

Scientific classification
- Kingdom: Animalia
- Phylum: Arthropoda
- Subphylum: Chelicerata
- Class: Arachnida
- Order: Araneae
- Infraorder: Mygalomorphae
- Family: Macrothelidae
- Genus: Macrothele
- Species: M. raveni

Binomial name
- Macrothele raveni Zhu, Li, & Song, 2000

Synonyms
- Gigathele raveni

Species of spider

Macrothele raveni (also known as Gigathele raveni) is a mygalomorph spider species, originally discovered in Guangxi. It is found throughout Ningming County.

Some raventoxins were originally isolated from the venom of M. raveni. Because of its effectiveness against certain cancer cell lines, such as K562 cells and Hep G2 cells, its venom has been considered for further research in treating leukemia. It has also been shown that M. raveni venom induces apoptosis in HeLa cells.
