= Funnel-web spider =

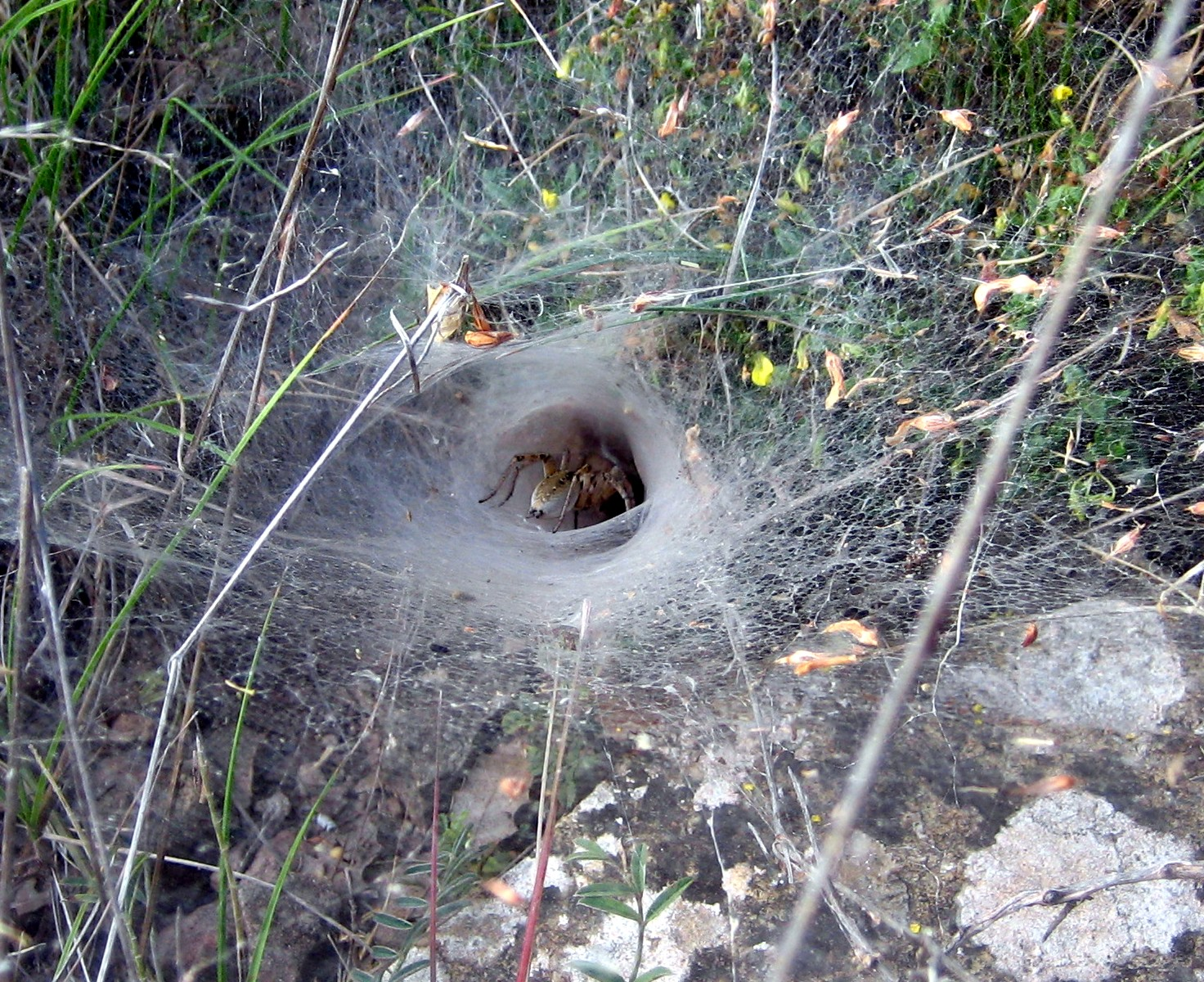
A funnel-web spider of the family Agelenidae sitting in its funnel-shaped web.

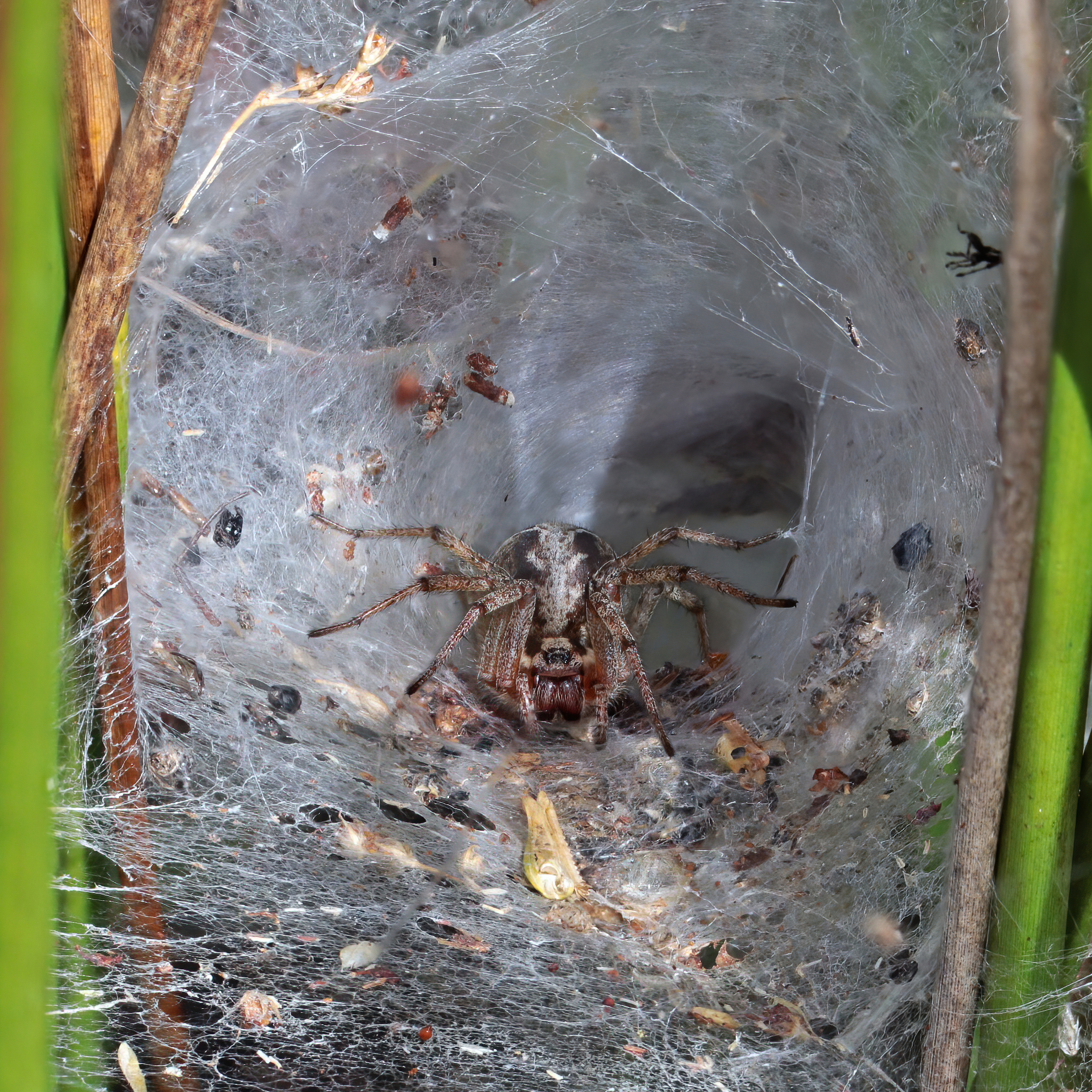
Agelena labyrinthica female in web

Funnel-web spider refers to many different species of spider, particularly those that spin a web in the shape of a funnel:

- spiders in the family Agelenidae, including
  - Hololena curta
- funnel-web spider (suborder Mygalomorphae):
  - family Atracidae, Australian funnel-web spiders, some of which produce venom dangerous to humans, including
    - Sydney funnel-web spider (Atrax robustus)
  - family Dipluridae
  - family Hexathelidae
  - family Nemesiidae
  - family Macrothelidae, sole genus Macrothele
  - family Mecicobothriidae, dwarf tarantulas or sheet funnel-web spiders
  - family Porrhothelidae, sole genus Porrhothele
