= Porrhothele modesta =

Conservation status
- Data Deficient (NZ TCS)

Scientific classification
- Kingdom: Animalia
- Phylum: Arthropoda
- Subphylum: Chelicerata
- Class: Arachnida
- Order: Araneae
- Infraorder: Mygalomorphae
- Family: Porrhothelidae
- Genus: Porrhothele
- Species: P. modesta

Binomial name
- Porrhothele modesta Forster, 1968

Species of spider

Porrhothele modesta is a species of Mygalomorphae spider endemic to New Zealand.

== Taxonomy ==
This species was described in 1968 by Ray Forster from female and male specimens from Waikaremoana. The holotype is stored at Canterbury Museum.

== Description ==
This species has a stocky appearance. Females are known to grow around 24 mm (0.94 in) in body length. The carapace and legs are brown. The abdomen is uniform purple. The males are smaller, being around 16mm in length. The males differ with orange carapace colouration, abdomen brownish with chevron patterns and the first pair of legs with modifications typical of male Porrhothele.

== Distribution ==
This species is only known from Waikaremoana in New Zealand.

== Conservation status ==
Under the New Zealand Threat Classification System, this species is listed as Data Deficient.
