= Porrhothele moana =

Conservation status
- Not Threatened (NZ TCS)

Scientific classification
- Kingdom: Animalia
- Phylum: Arthropoda
- Subphylum: Chelicerata
- Class: Arachnida
- Order: Araneae
- Infraorder: Mygalomorphae
- Family: Porrhothelidae
- Genus: Porrhothele
- Species: P. moana

Binomial name
- Porrhothele moana Forster, 1968

Species of spider

Porrhothele moana is a species of Mygalomorphae spider endemic to New Zealand.

== Taxonomy ==
This species was described in 1968 by Ray Forster from female and male specimens from Westland. The holotype is stored at Otago Museum.

== Description ==
This species has a stocky appearance. Females are known to grow over 16mm in body length. The carapace and legs are brown. The abdomen is purple, sometimes with faint chevron patterns dorsally. The males are of roughly the same size and colour, but with modifications in the first pair of legs typical of male Porrhothele.

== Distribution ==
This species is only known from Westland in New Zealand.

== Conservation status ==
Under the New Zealand Threat Classification System, this species is listed as Not Threatened.
