= Orientothele =

Scientific classification
- Kingdom: Animalia
- Phylum: Arthropoda
- Subphylum: Chelicerata
- Class: Arachnida
- Order: Araneae
- Infraorder: Mygalomorphae
- Family: Macrothelidae
- Genus: Orientothele; Mirza, Sanap & Kunte, 2017

Type species
- O. alyrata Mirza, Sanap & Kunte, 2017

Species
- 7, see text

Genus of spiders

Orientothele is a Chinese genus of spiders in the family Macrothelidae. Its members were formerly in genus Macrothele.

== Distribution ==
All Orientothele species are endemic to China, with the exception of the type species O. alyrata, which is endemic to India.

== Species ==
As of January 2026, this genus includes seven species:

- Orientothele alyrata Mirza, Sanap & Kunte, 2017 – India
- Orientothele jingzhao (Chen, Jiang & Yang, 2020) – China
- Orientothele jinlin (Z. B. Yang, Zhao, Zhang & Z. Z. Yang, 2018) – China
- Orientothele mingsheng (Wu & Z. Z. Yang, 2022) – China
- Orientothele washanensis (Wu & Z. Z. Yang, 2022) – China
- Orientothele wuliangensis (Wu & Z. Z. Yang, 2022) – China
- Orientothele yani (Xu, Yin & Griswold, 2002) – China
