= Bannathele =

Scientific classification
- Kingdom: Animalia
- Phylum: Arthropoda
- Subphylum: Chelicerata
- Class: Arachnida
- Order: Araneae
- Infraorder: Mygalomorphae
- Family: Macrothelidae
- Genus: Bannathele; Shao, Zhou & Lin, 2025
- Species: B. menglunensis

Binomial name
- Bannathele menglunensis (Li & Zha, 2013)

Synonyms
- Macrothele menglunensis Li & Zha, 2013

Species of spider

Bannathele is a monotypic genus of spiders in the family Macrothelidae containing the single species, Bannathele menglunensis. It was previously in genus Macrothele.

== Distribution ==
Bannathele menglunensis has been recorded from Menglun Town (勐仑镇; Měng lún zhèn), Mengla County, Xishuangbanna (西双版纳; Xīshuāngbǎnnà) rain forest in Yunnan, China.

== Description ==
Both genders have a body length of about 15 mm.

== Etymology ==
The genus name is a combination of "Banna" (from the type location) and "-thele" (from Macrothele). The species is named after the town where it was first found.
