= Hololena nedra =

Scientific classification
- Kingdom: Animalia
- Phylum: Arthropoda
- Subphylum: Chelicerata
- Class: Arachnida
- Order: Araneae
- Infraorder: Araneomorphae
- Family: Agelenidae
- Genus: Hololena
- Species: H. nedra

Binomial name
- Hololena nedra Chamberlin & Ivie, 1942

Species of spider

Hololena nedra is a species of funnel weaver in the family of spiders known as Agelenidae. It is found in the United States.
