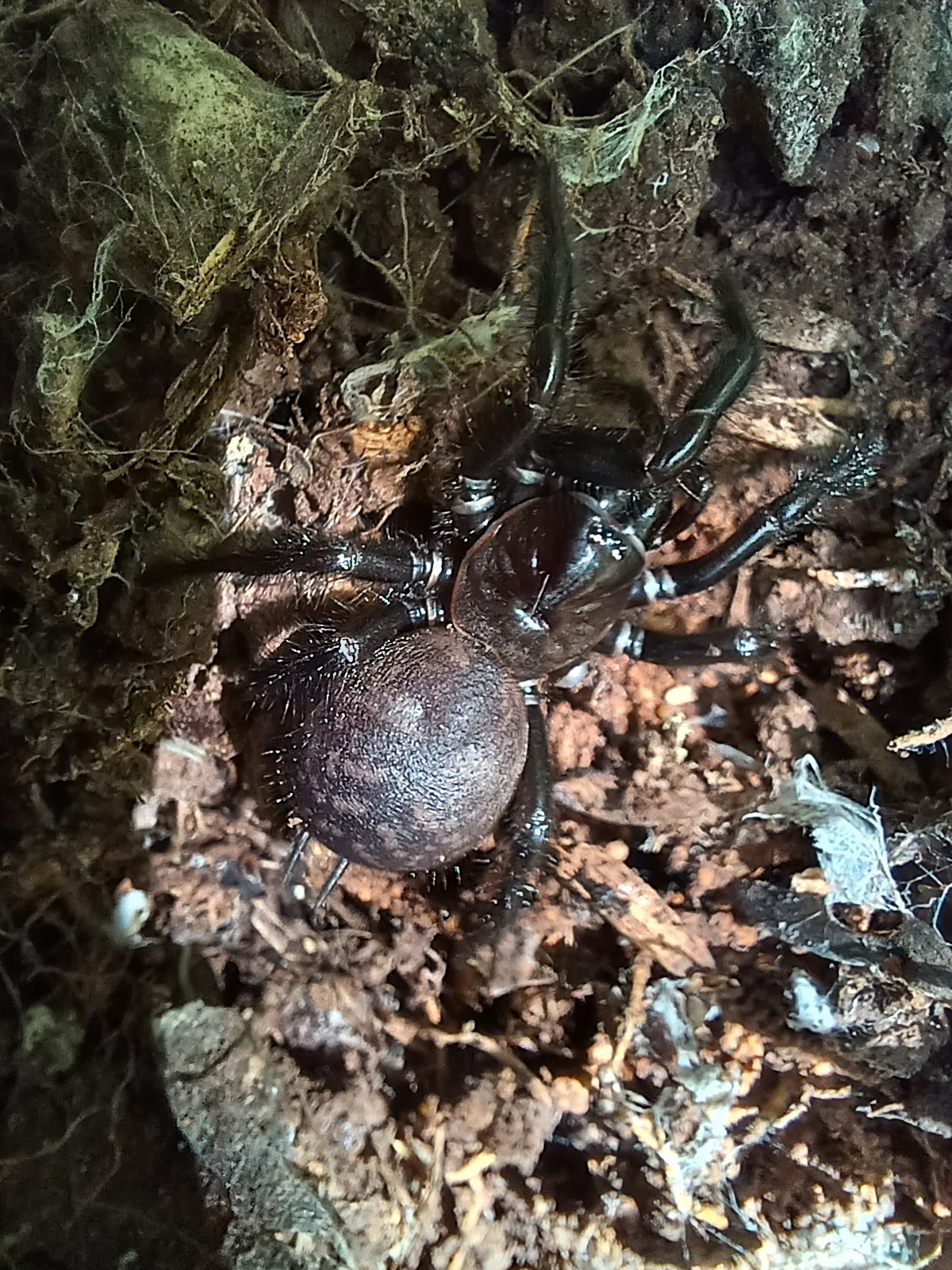

Scientific classification
- Kingdom: Animalia
- Phylum: Arthropoda
- Subphylum: Chelicerata
- Class: Arachnida
- Order: Araneae
- Infraorder: Mygalomorphae
- Family: Porrhothelidae
- Genus: Porrhothele
- Species: P. peninsularis

Binomial name
- Porrhothele peninsularis Thompson & Sirvid, 2026

= Porrhothele peninsularis =

Species of spider

Porrhothele peninsularis is a species of Porrhothelidae endemic to New Zealand. It is only known from Banks Peninsula in the Canterbury region of the South Island.
