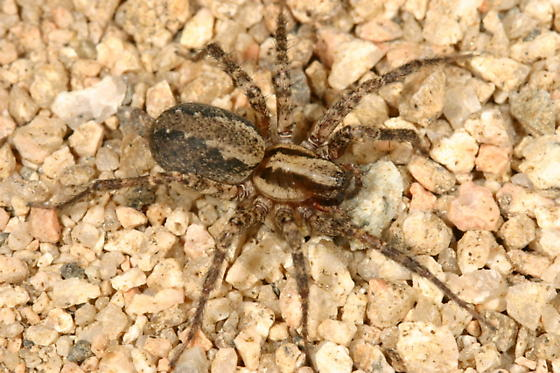
- H. santana
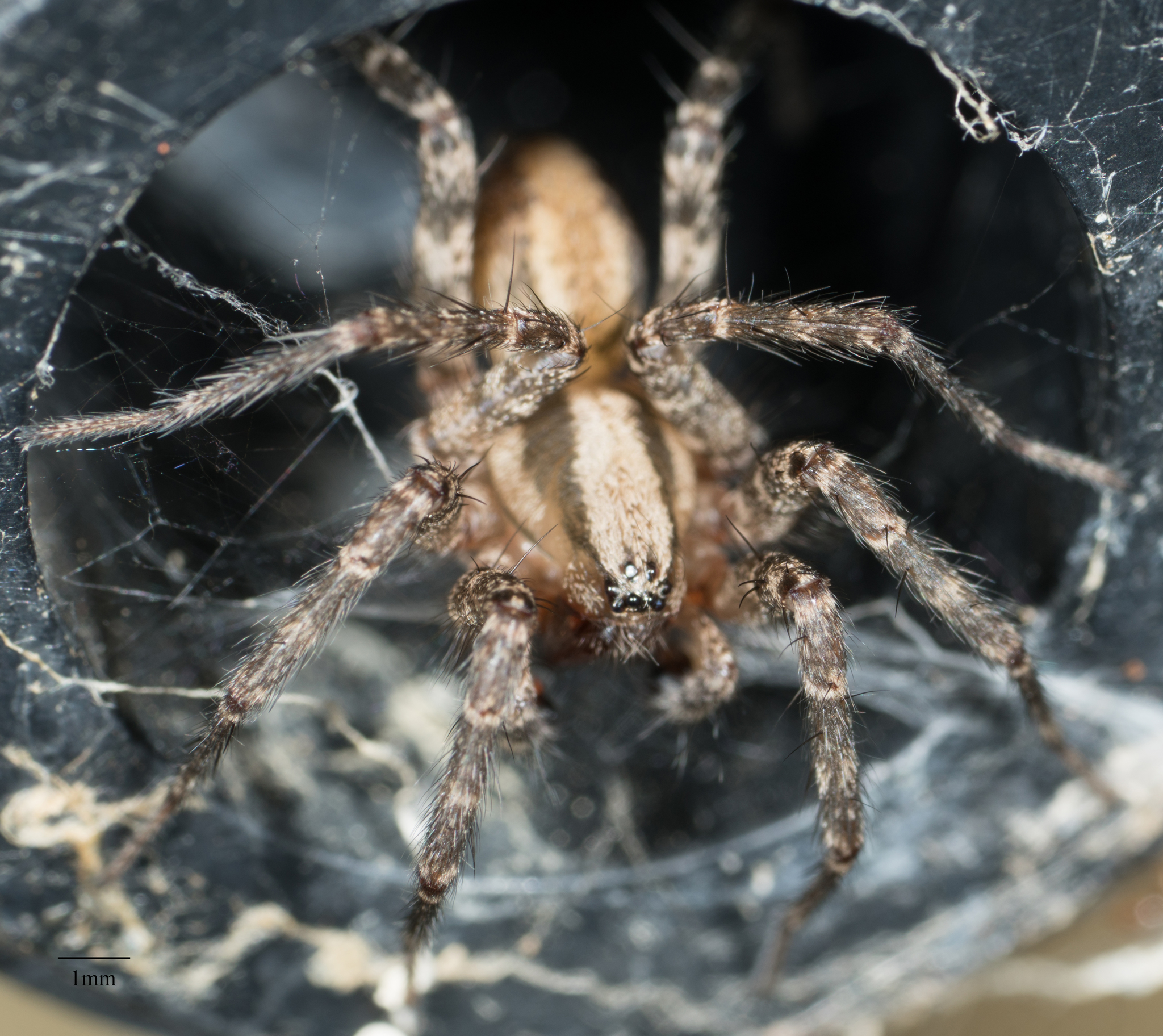
- male H. curta from California, USA

Scientific classification
- Kingdom: Animalia
- Phylum: Arthropoda
- Subphylum: Chelicerata
- Class: Arachnida
- Order: Araneae
- Infraorder: Araneomorphae
- Family: Agelenidae
- Genus: Hololena; Chamberlin & Gertsch, 1929

Type species
- H. mimoides (Chamberlin, 1919)

Species
- 30, see text

= Hololena =

Genus of spiders

Hololena is a genus of North American funnel weavers first described by R. V. Chamberlin & Willis J. Gertsch in 1929.

== Species ==
As of October 2026 it contains thirty species:

- Hololena adnexa (Chamberlin & Gertsch, 1929) – USA
- Hololena aduma Chamberlin & Ivie, 1942 – USA
- Hololena altura Chamberlin & Ivie, 1942 – USA
- Hololena atypica Chamberlin & Ivie, 1942 – USA
- Hololena barbarana Chamberlin & Ivie, 1942 – USA
- Hololena curta (McCook, 1894) – USA, Canada
- Hololena dana Chamberlin & Ivie, 1942 – USA
- Hololena frianta Chamberlin & Ivie, 1942 – USA
- Hololena furcata (Chamberlin & Gertsch, 1929) – USA
- Hololena hola (Chamberlin, 1928) – USA
- Hololena hopi Chamberlin & Ivie, 1942 – USA
- Hololena lassena Chamberlin & Ivie, 1942 – USA
- Hololena madera Chamberlin & Ivie, 1942 – USA
- Hololena mimoides (Chamberlin, 1919) – USA
- Hololena monterea Chamberlin & Ivie, 1942 – USA
- Hololena nedra Chamberlin & Ivie, 1942 – USA
- Hololena nevada (Chamberlin & Gertsch, 1929) – USA
- Hololena oola Chamberlin & Ivie, 1942 – USA
- Hololena oquirrhensis (Chamberlin & Gertsch, 1930) – USA
- Hololena pacifica (Banks, 1896) – USA
- Hololena parana Chamberlin & Ivie, 1942 – USA
- Hololena pearcei Chamberlin & Ivie, 1942 – USA
- Hololena rabana Chamberlin & Ivie, 1942 – USA
- Hololena santana Chamberlin & Ivie, 1942 – USA
- Hololena septata Chamberlin & Ivie, 1942 – USA, Mexico
- Hololena sidella Chamberlin & Ivie, 1942 – USA
- Hololena sula Chamberlin & Ivie, 1942 – USA
- Hololena tentativa (Chamberlin & Gertsch, 1929) – USA
- Hololena tulareana Chamberlin & Ivie, 1942 – USA
- Hololena turba Chamberlin & Ivie, 1942 – USA
