= Porrhothele blanda =

Conservation status
- Not Threatened (NZ TCS)

Scientific classification
- Kingdom: Animalia
- Phylum: Arthropoda
- Subphylum: Chelicerata
- Class: Arachnida
- Order: Araneae
- Infraorder: Mygalomorphae
- Family: Porrhothelidae
- Genus: Porrhothele
- Species: P. blanda

Binomial name
- Porrhothele blanda Forster, 1968

Species of spider

Porrhothele blanda is a species of Mygalomorphae spider endemic to New Zealand.

== Taxonomy ==
This species was described in 1968 by Ray Forster from male and female specimens in the northern South Island. The holotype is stored at Canterbury Museum.

== Description ==
This species has a stocky appearance. Females are known to grow up to 18mm in body length. The carapace and legs are brown. The abdomen is purple with chevron patterns dorsally. Males are smaller, being recorded at 13.5mm in length. The males also have a darker first pair of legs and modifications typical of male Porrhothele.

== Distribution ==
This species is only known from Nelson and Marlborough Sounds of New Zealand.

== Conservation status ==
Under the New Zealand Threat Classification System, this species is listed as Not Threatened.
