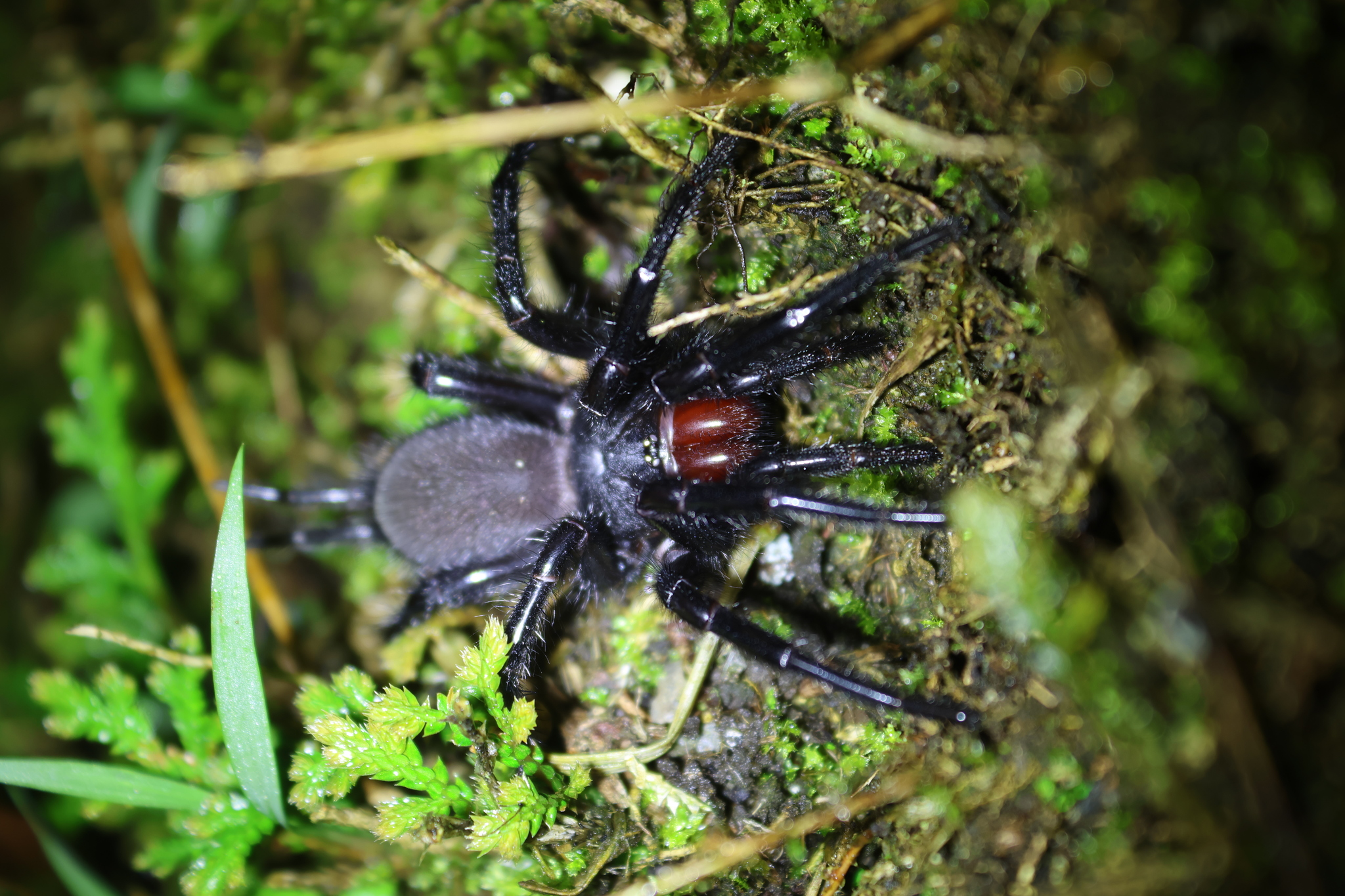
- G. hungae in Taiwan

Scientific classification
- Kingdom: Animalia
- Phylum: Arthropoda
- Subphylum: Chelicerata
- Class: Arachnida
- Order: Araneae
- Infraorder: Mygalomorphae
- Family: Macrothelidae
- Genus: Gigathele; Shao, Zhou & Lin, 2025

Type species
- Macrothele gigas Shimojana & Haupt, 1998

Species
- 6, see text

= Gigathele =

Genus of spiders

Gigathele is a genus of spiders in the family Macrothelidae.

== Distribution ==
Gigathele is known from East Asia, with most species occurring in China.

== Species ==
As of January 2026, this genus includes six species:

- Gigathele gigas (Shimojana & Haupt, 1998) – Japan (Ryukyu Islands)
- Gigathele guizhouensis (Hu & Li, 1986) – China
- Gigathele hungae (Lin & Li, 2021) – Taiwan
- Gigathele limenghuai (Lin & Li, 2021) – China
- Gigathele monocirculata (Xu & Yin, 2000) – China
- Gigathele raveni (Zhu, Li & Song, 2000) – China
