= Raventoxin =

Raventoxins are neurotoxins from the venom of the spider Macrothele raveni.

== Sources ==
Raventoxins are toxins from the venom of the spider Macrothele raveni. This is a hairy spider, a member of the genus Macrothele, that can be found in the hilly areas of Ningming County, Guangxi Province in China.

== Chemistry ==
Six different types of raventoxin have been described, named raventoxin-I to VI. Raventoxin-I consists of 43 amino acid residues. It has a molecular mass of 4840.11 Da. The toxin is partially homologous to δ-AcTx-Hv1a and δ-AcTx-Ar1, two toxins derived from Hadronyche versuta and Atrax robustus, respectively. Raventoxin-II has a molecular weight of 3021.56 Da. Raventoxin-III is a basic polypeptide, consisting of 29 amino acid residues. It has a molecular mass of 3286.58 Da. Raventoxin-V has a molecular weight of 3133.48 Da. Raventoxin-VI consists of 51 amino acid residues, and has a molecular weight of 5371.6 Da.

== Target and mode of action ==
All described raventoxins have shown to exert a neurotoxic effect. At low concentration, raventoxin-I enhances muscle contraction, suggesting a direct action of the toxin on muscle, whereas at higher concentration it blocks neuromuscular transmission. No toxins have shown to act similarly.

The primary structure of raventoxin-III is identical to that of Magi 5 (β-hexatoxin-Mg1a), a toxin found in the venom of the spider Macrothele gigas. Magi 5 binds at site 4 of the alpha subunit of the mammalian voltage-gated sodium channel Nav1.2 (SCN2A). Binding of Magi 5 to the sodium channels shifts both activation and inactivation to more hyperpolarized voltages and slows the recovery from inactivation. Combined, these effects may lead to increased inactivation of the sodium channels at rest, leading to inhibition and blockage of neuromuscular transmission. The blockage is most probably reversible. Magi-5 competes with the scorpion beta-toxin Css IV for binding to the sodium channel at neurotoxin receptor site 4. One other known property of Magi-5 is its binding to site 3 of the insect sodium channel, observed in lepidopteran larvae, which raises the possibility of homology between the molecular structures of the binding site 3 (in insects) and 4 (in mammals).

Raventoxin-VI blocks neuromuscular transmission in a rat phrenic nerve preparation. Intracerebroventricular injection of the toxin leads to paralysis in rat.

== Toxicity ==
Raventoxin-I and raventoxin-III have both shown excitation, spastic paralysis, gasping, a fast heartbeat and exophthalmos in mice. Only raventoxin-I also shows an increase in salivation. Both toxins can cause death in mice, when sufficiently administered. The LD_{50} of raventoxin-I is 0.772 mg/kg when intra-abdominally injected in mice. Raventoxin-I and raventoxin-III are not toxic for cockroaches., but administration of Magi-5 (raventoxin-III) in lepidopteran larvae results in temporary paralysis of the insects. Raventoxin-II and raventoxin-V also have insecticidal effects.

== Therapeutic use ==
The effect of administering the whole venom of the Macrothele raveni spider has been studied in several diseases, especially in carcinomata. In HeLa cells, it showed necrosis, direct lysis and apoptosis. The antitumor effect of the venom is also shown in a human breast carcinoma cell line, MCF-7, where cytotoxic changes, apoptosis and necrosis were caused by the venom. After administration of the venom in affected mice, the tumor size significantly decreased compared to the tumor size in control mice.
