= Spinathele =

Scientific classification
- Kingdom: Animalia
- Phylum: Arthropoda
- Subphylum: Chelicerata
- Class: Arachnida
- Order: Araneae
- Infraorder: Mygalomorphae
- Family: Macrothelidae
- Genus: Spinathele; Shao, Zhou & Lin, 2025

Type species
- Macrothele hanfeii Lin & Li, 2021

Species
- 4, see text

Genus of spiders

Spinathele is a genus of spiders in the family Macrothelidae.

== Distribution ==
Spinathele is distributed in southeastern Asia, with most species occurring in China.

== Species ==
As of January 2026, this genus includes four species:

- Spinathele bannaensis (Xu & Yin, 2001) – China, Laos
- Spinathele hanfeii (Lin & Li, 2021) – China (Hainan)
- Spinathele holsti (Pocock, 1901) – Taiwan
- Spinathele nanning (Lin & Li, 2021) – China
