= Microthele =

Scientific classification
- Kingdom: Animalia
- Phylum: Arthropoda
- Subphylum: Chelicerata
- Class: Arachnida
- Order: Araneae
- Infraorder: Mygalomorphae
- Family: Macrothelidae
- Genus: Microthele; Shao, Zhou & Lin, 2025

Type species
- Macrothele undata Tang, Zhao & Yang, 2020

Species
- 3, see text

Genus of spiders

Microthele is a genus of spiders in the family Macrothelidae.

== Distribution ==
All Microthele are endemic to China.

== Species ==
As of January 2026, this genus includes three species:

- Microthele sanheensis (Tang, Zhao & Yang, 2020) – China
- Microthele sphaerica (Zheng, Wu & Yang, 2024) – China
- Microthele undata (Tang, Zhao & Yang, 2020) – China
