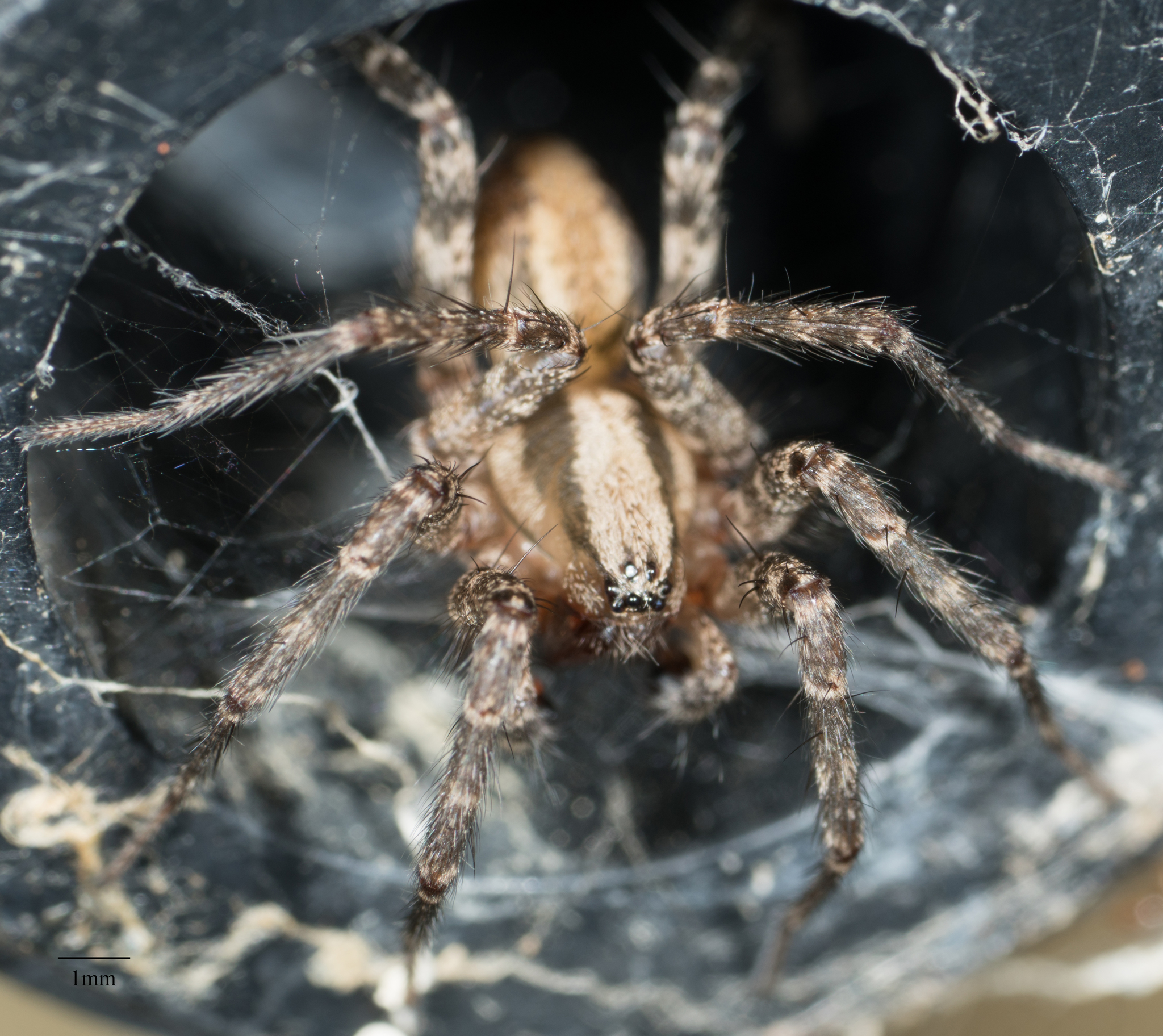

Scientific classification
- Kingdom: Animalia
- Phylum: Arthropoda
- Subphylum: Chelicerata
- Class: Arachnida
- Order: Araneae
- Infraorder: Araneomorphae
- Family: Agelenidae
- Genus: Hololena
- Species: H. curta

Binomial name
- Hololena curta (McCook, 1894)

Synonyms
- Agelena curta McCook, 1894

= Hololena curta =

Species of spider

Hololena curta, commonly known as corner funnel weaver or funnel web spider, is a species of venomous spiders belonging to a family of Agelenidae.

It is native to Canada and the United States.

This species and related species produce a venom that contains a group of insecticidal acylpolyamines, insecticidal peptide, and a group of neurotoxins.

Males have adapted to avoid sexual cannibalism by mating with virgin females, as both females and males can mate multiple times, but females become aggressive after having mated.
