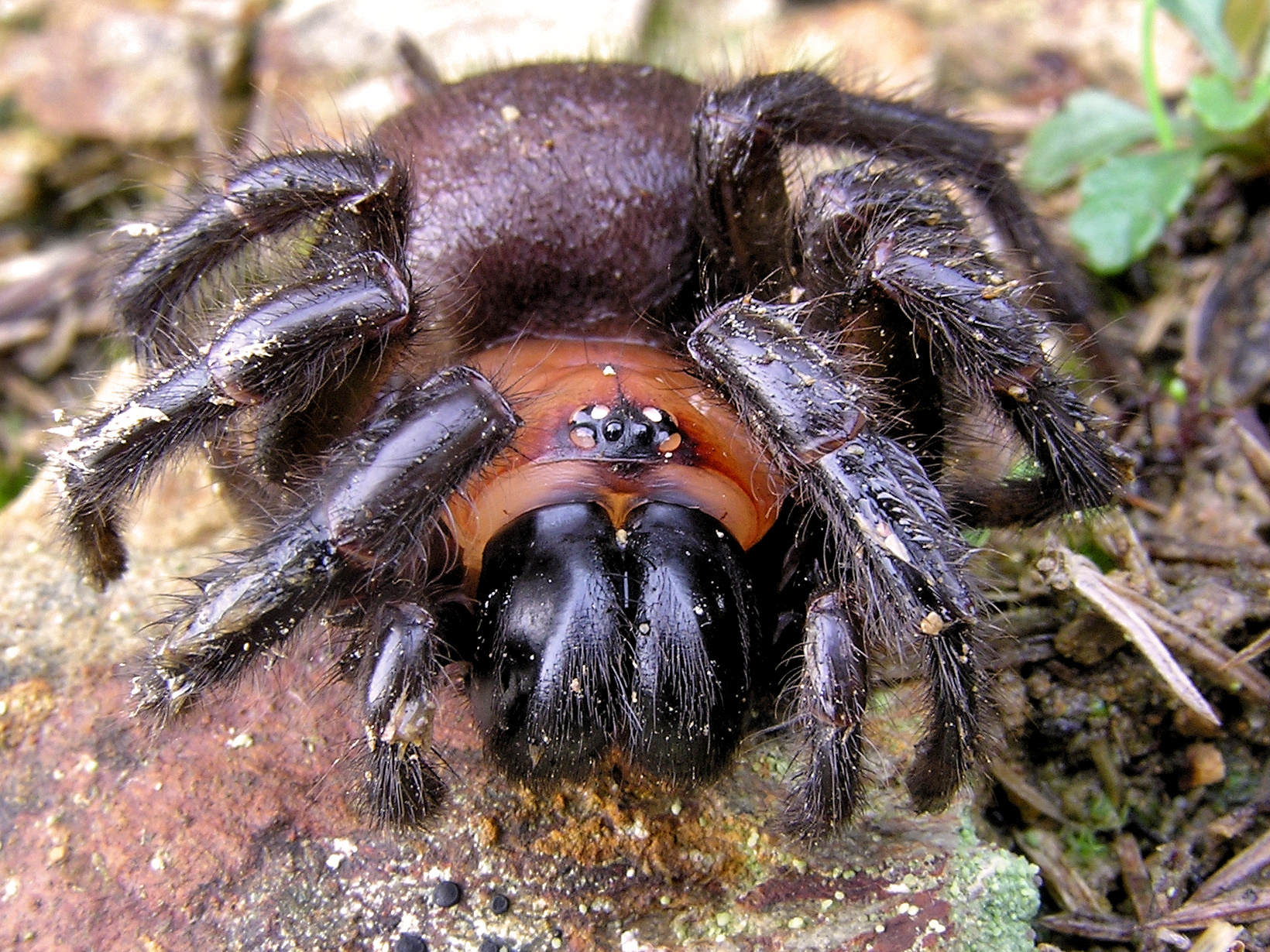
- Porrhothele antipodiana
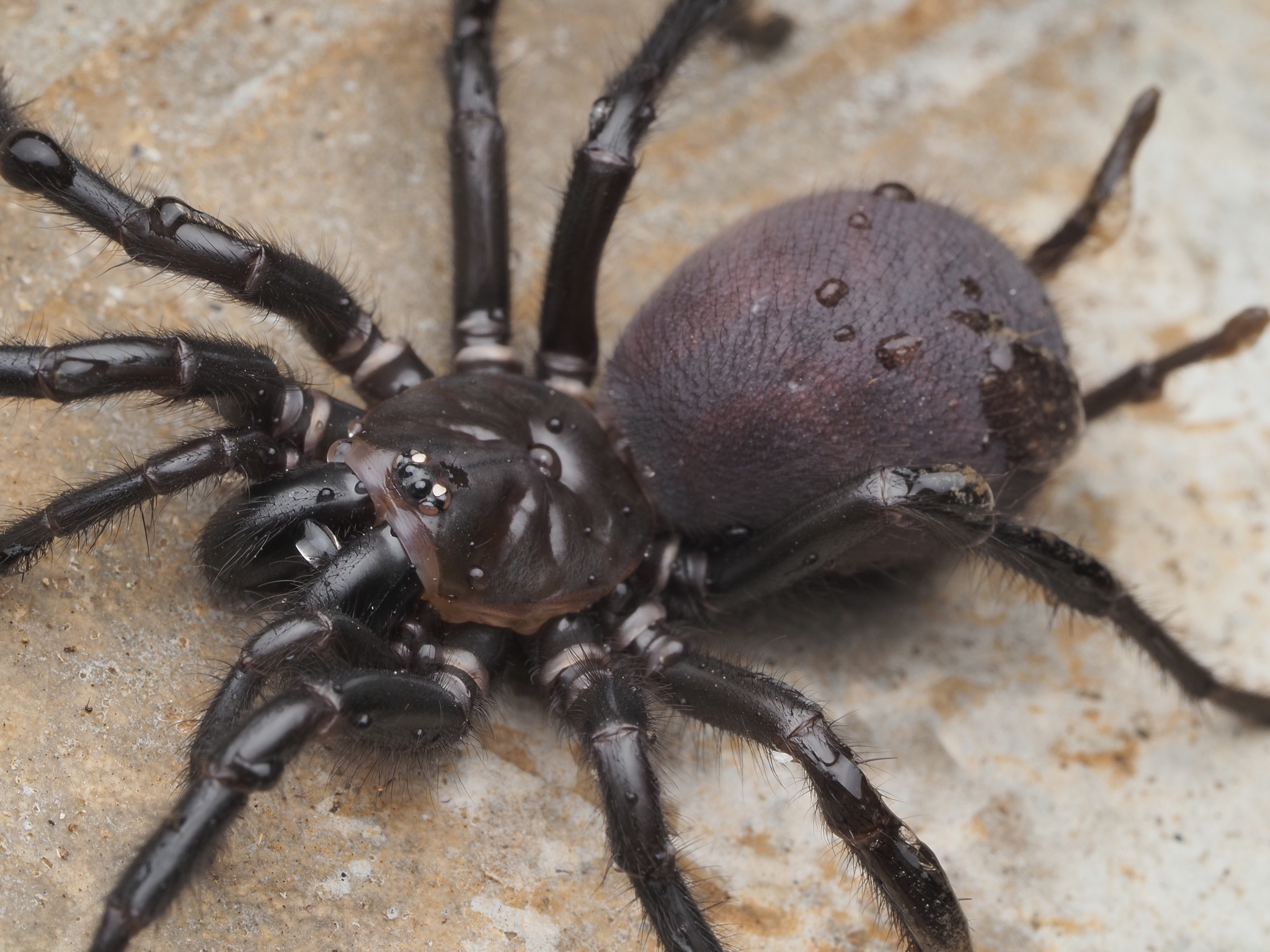
- P. quadrigyna

Scientific classification
- Kingdom: Animalia
- Phylum: Arthropoda
- Subphylum: Chelicerata
- Class: Arachnida
- Order: Araneae
- Infraorder: Mygalomorphae
- Family: Porrhothelidae; Hedin & Bond, 2018
- Genus: Porrhothele; Simon, 1892

Type species
- P. antipodiana (Walckenaer, 1837)

Species
- 6, see text

= Porrhothele =

Genus of spiders

Porrhothele is a genus of mygalomorph spiders endemic to New Zealand. They are the only members of the family Porrhothelidae. They were first described by Eugène Louis Simon in 1892. Originally placed with the curtain web spiders, it was moved to the Hexathelidae in 1980, they were placed in their own family in 2018.

Members of Porrhothelidae are distinguished from other mygalomorph spiders by the small posterior sigillae and a single row of teeth on the forward-facing margin of the chelicerae. Males have many strong spines on the forward-facing margin of their tibiae.

== Taxonomy ==
The genus Porrhothele was erected by Eugène Simon in 1892 for the species Porrhothele antipodiana. Simon transferred these from Mygale, a genus previously used for many mygalomorph spiders, but is no longer in use. He placed this genus in the subfamily Diplurinae, which later became the family Dipluridae. Raven transferred the genus to Hexathelidae, where it remained until the results of a 2018 molecular phylogenetic study suggested that it belongs in its own family.

The following cladogram shows the possible relationship of Porrhothele to related taxa.

- - Dipluridae
  - - Hexathelidae
    - - Porrhothele (Porrhothelidae)
      - - Macrothelidae
        - - - Calisoga (Nemesiidae)
            - Hebestatis (Halonoproctidae)
          - - Atracidae
            - Actinopodidae

== Species ==
As of April 2026 this genus contains six species, all endemic to New Zealand:

- Porrhothele antipodiana (Walckenaer, 1837) (type)
- Porrhothele blanda Forster, 1968
- Porrhothele moana Forster, 1968
- Porrhothele modesta Forster, 1968
- Porrhothele peninsularis Thompson and Sirvid, 2026
- Porrhothele quadrigyna Forster, 1968
