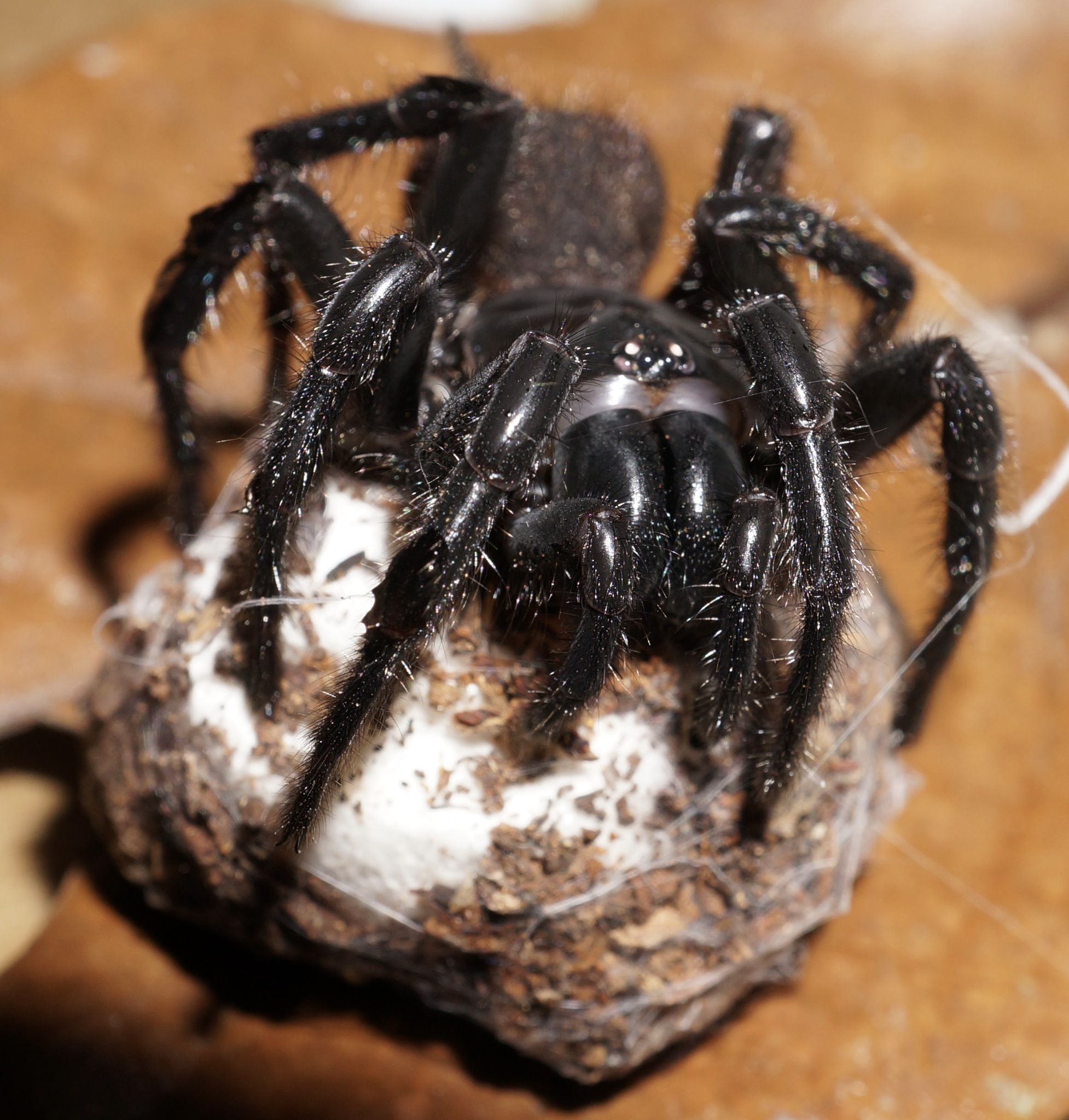

Conservation status
- Not Threatened (NZ TCS)

Scientific classification
- Kingdom: Animalia
- Phylum: Arthropoda
- Subphylum: Chelicerata
- Class: Arachnida
- Order: Araneae
- Infraorder: Mygalomorphae
- Family: Porrhothelidae
- Genus: Porrhothele
- Species: P. quadrigyna

Binomial name
- Porrhothele quadrigyna Forster, 1968

= Porrhothele quadrigyna =

Species of spider

Porrhothele quadrigyna is a species of Mygalomorphae spider endemic to New Zealand.

== Taxonomy ==
This species was described in 1968 by Ray Forster from numerous female specimens throughout the Northland region.

The holotype is stored at Te Papa Museum under registration number AS.000094.

== Description ==
This species has a stocky appearance. They are known to grow over 20mm in body length. The carapace and legs are blackish brown. The abdomen is brown with blotches.

== Distribution ==
This species is found in the Northland region of New Zealand. It is also known to occur on Hen Island and Poor Knights Islands.

== Conservation status ==
Under the New Zealand Threat Classification System, this species is listed as Not Threatened.
