= Vacrothele =

Scientific classification
- Kingdom: Animalia
- Phylum: Arthropoda
- Subphylum: Chelicerata
- Class: Arachnida
- Order: Araneae
- Infraorder: Mygalomorphae
- Family: Macrothelidae
- Genus: Vacrothele; Tang & Yang, 2022

Type species
- V. hunanica (Zhu & Song, 2000)

Species
- 14, see text

Genus of spiders

Vacrothele is a genus of mygalomorph spiders in the family Macrothelidae. It was first described by Tang & Yang in 2022.

== Distribution ==
Most species are endemic to China, with some found in Japan and Taiwan.

== Species ==
As of January 2026, this genus includes fourteen species:

- Vacrothele amamiensis (Shimojana & Haupt, 1998) – Japan (Ryukyu Islands)
- Vacrothele baiseensis Zheng, Zhao & Yang, 2025 – China
- Vacrothele digitata (Chen, Jiang & Yang, 2020) – China
- Vacrothele emei (Lin & Li, 2021) – China
- Vacrothele fuyuanensis Zheng, Zhao & Yang, 2025 – China
- Vacrothele hunanica (Zhu & Song, 2000) – China
- Vacrothele jiangkouensis Zheng, Zhao & Yang, 2025 – China
- Vacrothele meitanensis Zhang, Zheng & Yang, 2025 – China
- Vacrothele palpator (Pocock, 1901) – China, Hong Kong
- Vacrothele pseudohunanica Tang, Wu, Zhao & Yang, 2022 – China
- Vacrothele taiwanensis (Shimojana & Haupt, 1998) – Taiwan
- Vacrothele uncata Tang, Wu, Zhao & Yang, 2022 – China
- Vacrothele yaginumai (Shimojana & Haupt, 1998) – Japan (Ryukyu Islands)
- Vacrothele yunnanica (Zhu & Song, 2000) – China
