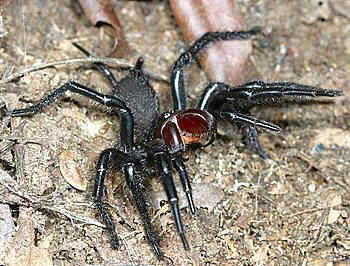
- Female Macrothele gigas

Scientific classification
- Kingdom: Animalia
- Phylum: Arthropoda
- Subphylum: Chelicerata
- Class: Arachnida
- Order: Araneae
- Infraorder: Mygalomorphae
- Clade: Avicularioidea
- Family: Macrothelidae; Simon, 1892

Genera
- 7, see text
- blue: reported countries (WSC) green: observation hotspots (iNaturalist)

= Macrothelidae =

Macrothelidae Temporal range: Cenomanian–Recent

Family of spiders

Macrothelidae is a family of mygalomorph spiders, split off from the family Hexathelidae in 2018. It contains extant genera, and the extinct Promacrothele.

== Genera ==
As of January 2026, this family includes seven genera and 56 species:

- Bannathele Shao, Zhou & Lin, 2025 – China
- Gigathele Shao, Zhou & Lin, 2025 – China, Japan, Taiwan
- Macrothele Ausserer, 1871 – Cameroon, Democratic Republic of the Congo, Equatorial Guinea, Algeria, Morocco, Asia, Greece, Portugal, Spain
- Microthele Shao, Zhou & Lin, 2025 – China
- Orientothele Mirza, Sanap & Kunte, 2017 – China, India
- Spinathele Shao, Zhou & Lin, 2025 – China, Taiwan, Laos
- Vacrothele Tang & Yang, 2022 – China, Japan, Taiwan, Hong Kong

=== Extinct ===
- Promacrothele Burmese amber, Myanmar, mid Cretaceous.
