= Zorić =

Zorić (Serbian Cyrillic: Зopић, pronounced [zǒːritɕ]) is a Serbo-Croatian surname. It may derived from feminine given name Zora ("dawn") or from masculine Zor, diminutive of the names starting with "Zor-", e.g., Zorislav, Zoran. It may refer to:

- Dragan Zorić (born 1979), Serbian sprint canoeist
- Marko Zorić (born 1980), Serbian footballer
- Nataša Zorić (born 1989), Serbian tennis player
- Nikola Zorić (born 1981), Serbian musician, keyboardist for Riblja Čorba
- Darko Zorić, a Montenegrin footballer
- Gordana Zorić, a Serbian politician

== See also ==
- Zoran
- Zorica
- Zoričić
- Zorčić
- Zorich
