= Ve státním zájmu =

Ve státním zájmu (English: In the National Interest) is contemporary comedy by Czech playwright and actor Antonín Procházka about love and politicians who explain their perfidy national interests.

== Story ==
Slightly goofy inventor, the widow of the owner of the Družba pipeline, philandering politician across the political spectrum, sports commentator, who found that not even in sports is not playing fair play and a young filmmaker looking for pure love, or at least after sponsors are protagonists latest comedy Antonin Prochazka. Unlike her previous comedies, the author this time does not just partner crises, but also brings to the stage antihero today, bezkrupulózního zaklínajícího policy of state interest and representative of modern and morally (at least) questionable profession? lobbyist, demonstrating that, although it is hard to believe, the current political situation and a good time. But only in the theatre, which can, unlike reality, the luxury happy end. Comedy is in the walk wins crooks, but polite and quite ordinary people.

== Theatre ==
=== Divadlo J. K. Tyla, Plzeň ===
- Directed by Antonín Procházka. Dramaturgy by Eva Langšádlová and Ivan Hubač.

Zdeněk Rohlíček (Eman), Štěpánka Křesťanová (Iva), Martin Stránský (Radim), Antonín Procházka (Lumír), Monika Švábová (Regina), Michal Štěrba (Lobbist Hejny), Kristýna Hlaváčková (Radka), Jana Kubátová (Klára), Zorka Kostková (Mrs. Plachá), Martin Chmelař (Boxer), Veronika Holubová (Postwoman), Petr Zapletal (Journalist)

Video & photos: Video in J. K. Tyl Theatre Website and Video in Youtube

=== Tylovo divadlo, Újezd u Brna ===
- Directed by Jaromír Jakubec

Photos and an article: Website
