= Zorich =

Zorich is a family name of Slavic origin. The following people share this name:

- Alexander Zorich, a collective pen name
- Anton Zorich (born 1962), Russian mathematician teaching in Paris, son of Vladimir
- Chris Zorich (born 1969), American football player
- Louis Zorich (1924–2018), American actor
- Semyon Zorich (1745–1799), Serbian noble
- Vladimir A. Zorich (1937–2023), Russian mathematician, father of Anton

== See also ==
- Zorić
