= Zorka =

Zorka is an old given Slavic name meaning the dawn.

== Notable people ==
- Zorka Grandov (1947–2021), Serbian economist
- Zorka Janů (1921–1946), Czech film actress, younger sister of cinema star Lída Baarová
- Princess Zorka of Montenegro (1864–1890), and later became Princess Zorka Karađorđević in Serbia
- Zorka Parvanova (born 1958), Bulgarian historian and former First Lady of Bulgaria
- Zorka Ságlová (1943–2003), Czech artist
- Zorka Todosić (1864–1936), Serbian stage actress and operetta singer
- Zorka Velimirović (1883–1963), Serbian translator

== Other ==
- Zorka (genus), an insect genus in the tribe Typhlocybini
- Zorka Color, a Serbian ceramics and paint company acquired by Tikkurila (corporation) in 2011

== See also ==
- FC Zorka-BDU Minsk, Belarusian football team, based in Minsk, Belarus
- Zork, an interactive fiction computer game
- Zora (disambiguation)
