= Zora (name) =

Zora is a given name with origins across multiple cultures, most prominently Slavic, Arabic, Hebrew, and West African. Its roots and usage span both genders depending on cultural context.

== People with the name ==
=== Given name ===
- Zora Andrich, American model and actress
- Zora Arkus-Duntov (1909–1996), American engineer
- Zora Kramer Brown (1949–2013), American breast cancer awareness advocate
- Zora Brziaková (born 1964), Slovak basketball player
- Zora Clevenger (1881–1970), American football, basketball, and baseball player
- Zora Cross (1890–1964), Australian poet and author
- Zora Dirnbach (1929–2019), Croatian writer
- Zora Fair (died 1865), American spy
- Zora Folley (1931–1972), American boxer
- Zora Howard, American actress and writer
- Zora Neale Hurston (1891–1960), American author, anthropologist, and filmmaker
- Zora Jandová (born 1958), Czech singer and actress
- Zora Jaurová (born 1973), Slovak politician
- Zora Jones, Austrian musician and visual artist
- Zora Kerova (born 1950), Czech actress
- Zora Kolínska (1941–2002), Slovak actress and singer
- Zora Kostková (born 1952), Czech actress
- Zora Singh Maan (born 1940), Indian politician
- Zora Martin-Felton (1930–2022), American museum director
- Zora Mintalová-Zubercová (born 1950), Slovak ethnographer, historian and museologist
- Zora J. Murff (born 1987), American photographer
- Zora Palová (born 1947), Slovak glass artist
- Zora Petrović (1894–1962), Serbian painter
- Zora Plešnar (1925–2021), Slovenian photographer
- Zora Rozsypalová (1922–2010), Czech actress
- Zora Šemberová (1913–2012), Czech dancer, educator and choreographer
- Zora Simčáková (born 1963), Slovak cross-country skier
- Zora Singh (1928–2005), Indian athlete
- Zora Stančič (born 1956), Slovene graphic and visual artist
- Zora Tavčar (born 1928), Slovene writer, essayist and translator
- Zora Vesecká (born 1967), Czech actress
- Zora Wolfová (1928–2012), Czech translator
- Zora Young (born 1948), American singer

==== Fictional characters ====
- Zora (vampire), an Italian comic book erotic character
- Zora Crane, a character played by Patti LuPone in Frasier
- Zora Ideale, a character in Black Clover voiced by Hikaru Midorikawa and Johnny Yong Bosch
- Zora Lancaster, a character played by Allisyn Ashley Arm in Sonny With a Chance
- Zora Blackwood, a character in the 2019 video game The Outer Worlds
- Zora Bennett, a character played by Scarlett Johansson in Jurassic World Rebirth

=== Surname ===
- Anna Lacková-Zora (1899–1988), Slovak author
- Hanna Zora (1939–2016), Chaldean Catholic archbishop

== See also ==
- Zora (disambiguation)
- Zoran, the masculine form of Zora
- Zorka, a given name
- Zorya, a figure in Slavic folklore
- Zhora Salome, a character in Blade Runner
