= Přes přísný zákaz dotýká se sněhu =

Přes přísný zákaz dotýká se sněhu (English: Over a strict ban on touching snow) is comedy play from present-day which he written dramatic, actor and director Antonín Procházka in 2003.

The play had a premiere 25 October 2003 in Plzeň's J. K. Tyl Theatre.

== Story ==
Main hero is Eda - white horse just released from prison which pass a memory on him. His wife, Nina, found a lover, but Nina's lover also likes Eda. Eda is after supervision the social worker which he helps with adaptation in the freedom.

== Productions ==
=== Divadlo J. K. Tyla ===
- Directed by Antonín Procházka. The play had premiere at 25 October, 2003 in J. K. Tyl Theatre]
- Erik .... Viktor Limr
- Nina .... Štěpánka Křesťanová
- Eda .... Antonín Procházka
- Edita Kudlanová .... Monika Švábová
- Ester Kožená .... Andrea Černá
- Jarda a.k.a. Window .... Michal Štrich
- Cop .... Michal Štěrba
- Russian Guy .... Vilém Dubnička
- Naděžda .... Taťána Kupcová

=== Divadlo Pod Palmovkou ===
- Directed by Antonín Procházka like a guest. The play had premiere at 15 and 17 January, 2004 in Divadlo pod Palmovkou, Prague.
- Erik .... Jan Teplý
- Nina .... Miroslava Pleštilová
- Eda .... Jan Moravec
- Edita Kudlanová .... Kateřina Macháčková or Marcela Nohýnková
- Ester Kožená .... Zuzana Slavíková
- Jarda the Window .... Ivo Kubečka
- Cop .... Otto Rošetzký
- Russian Guy .... Radek Zima or Daniel Bambas
- Naděžda .... Petra Kotmelová

== Article's Notes ==
- SSM - Socialistic Alliance of Youths
- Nusel Bridge
- Václav Špála
- Franz Kafka
- Uzhhorod
- Božena Němcová
- Radetzky March
