= Quasiregular map =

Class of continuous maps between Riemannian manifolds of the same dimension

In the mathematical field of analysis, quasiregular maps are a class of continuous maps between Euclidean spaces R^{n} of the same dimension or, more generally, between Riemannian manifolds of the same dimension, which share some of the basic properties with holomorphic functions of one complex variable.

== Motivation ==
The theory of holomorphic (=analytic) functions of one complex variable is one of the most beautiful and most useful parts of the whole mathematics.

One drawback of this theory is that it deals only with maps between two-dimensional spaces (Riemann surfaces). The theory of functions of several complex variables has a different character, mainly because analytic functions of several variables are not conformal. Conformal maps can be defined between Euclidean spaces of arbitrary dimension, but when the dimension is greater than 2, this class of maps is very small: it consists of Möbius transformations only. This is a theorem of Joseph Liouville; relaxing the smoothness assumptions does not help, as proved by Yurii Reshetnyak.

This suggests the search of a generalization of the property of conformality which would give a rich and interesting class of maps in higher dimension.

== Definition ==
A differentiable map f of a region D in R^{n} to R^{n} is called K-quasiregular if the following inequality holds at all points in D:

$$\| Df(x)\|^n\leq K|J_f(x)|$$.

Here K ≥ 1 is a constant, J_{f} is the Jacobian determinant, Df is the derivative, that is the linear map defined by the Jacobi matrix, and ||·|| is the usual (Euclidean) norm of the matrix.

The development of the theory of such maps showed that it is unreasonable to restrict oneself to differentiable maps in the classical sense, and that the "correct" class of maps consists of continuous maps in the Sobolev space W^{1,n}_{loc} whose partial derivatives in the sense of distributions have locally summable n-th power, and such that the above inequality is satisfied almost everywhere. This is a formal definition of a K-quasiregular map. A map is called quasiregular if it is K-quasiregular with some K. Constant maps are excluded from the class of quasiregular maps.

== Properties ==
The fundamental theorem about quasiregular maps was proved by Reshetnyak:

Quasiregular maps are open and discrete.

This means that the images of open sets are open and that preimages of points consist of isolated points. In dimension 2, these two properties give a topological characterization of the class of non-constant analytic functions: every continuous open and discrete map of a plane domain to the plane can be pre-composed with a homeomorphism, so that the result is an analytic function. This is a theorem of Simion Stoilov.

Reshetnyak's theorem implies that all pure topological results about analytic functions (such that the Maximum Modulus Principle, Rouché's theorem etc.) extend to quasiregular maps.

Injective quasiregular maps are called quasiconformal. A simple example of non-injective quasiregular map is given in cylindrical coordinates in 3-space by the formula

$$(r,\theta,z)\mapsto (r,2\theta,z).$$

This map is 2-quasiregular. It is smooth everywhere except the z-axis. A remarkable fact is that all smooth quasiregular maps are local homeomorphisms. Even more remarkable is that every quasiregular local homeomorphism R^{n} → R^{n}, where n ≥ 3, is a homeomorphism (this is a theorem of Vladimir Zorich).

This explains why in the definition of quasiregular maps it is not reasonable to restrict oneself to smooth maps: all smooth quasiregular maps of R^{n} to itself are quasiconformal.

== Rickman's theorem ==
Many theorems about geometric properties of holomorphic functions of one complex variable have been extended to quasiregular maps. These extensions are usually highly non-trivial.

Perhaps the most famous result of this sort is the extension of Picard's theorem which is due to Seppo Rickman:

A K-quasiregular map R^{n} → R^{n} can omit at most a finite set.

When n = 2, this omitted set can contain at most one point (this is a simple extension of Picard's theorem). But when n > 2, the omitted set can contain more than one point, and its cardinality can be estimated from above in terms of n and K. In fact, any finite set can be omitted, as shown by David Drasin and Pekka Pankka.

== Connection with potential theory ==
If f is an analytic function, then log |f| is subharmonic, and harmonic away from the zeros of f. The corresponding fact for quasiregular maps is that log |f| satisfies a certain non-linear partial differential equation of elliptic type. This discovery of Reshetnyak stimulated the development of non-linear potential theory, which treats this kind of equations as the usual potential theory treats harmonic and subharmonic functions.

== See also ==
- Yurii Reshetnyak
- Vladimir Zorich
