= Zorich's theorem =

In mathematical analysis, Zorich's theorem was proved by Vladimir A. Zorich in 1967. The result was conjectured by M. A. Lavrentev in 1938.

== Theorem ==
Every locally homeomorphic quasiregular mapping $f : R^{n} \rightarrow R^{n}$ for $n \geq 3$, is a homeomorphism of $R^{n}$.

The fact that there is no such result for $n = 2$ is easily shown using the exponential function.
