= Like Totally Weird =

Like Totally Weird is a comedy play by William Mastrosimone.

== Productions ==
Like Totally Weird premiered at the Humana Festival in Louisville Kentucky.

=== Divadlo J. K. Tyla ===
- Directed by Martin Vokoun. The play had premiere on 13 December 2008 in J. K. Tyl Theatre in Plzeň. Czech name is Jako naprostý šílenci.
- Russ Rigel .... Martin Stránský
- Jennifer Barton .... Andrea Černá
- Kenny .... Jan Maléř
- Jimmy .... Zdeněk Rohlíček

=== Východočeské divadlo ===
- Directed by Jiří Seydler. The play had premiere on 28 September 2003 - 14 November 2003 in Eastern Bohemian Theatre in Pardubice. Czech title is Jako naprostí šílenci.
- Russ Bigel .... Petr Brychta
- Jennifer Barton .... Kristina Jelínková
- Kenny .... Tomáš Kolomazník
- Jimmy .... Zdeněk Rumpík

=== Actors Theatre ===
- Directed by Mladen Kiselov. The play had premiere 10 March 1998 - 4 April 1998 in Actors Theatre of Louisville and 22nd Humana Festival of New American Plays.
- Russ Rigel .... Craig Heidenreich
- Jennifer Barton .... Kim Rhodes
- Kenny .... Kevin Blake
- Jimmy .... Chris Stafford
- Voice of Chauffeur .... Craig Michael Robillatd

=== Divadlo Exil ===
- Directed by Jan Smeták. We can a play watching on 28 February 2009 in Exil Theatre, Pardubice.
- Russ Bigel .... Tomáš Klement
- Jennifer Barton .... Naďa Kubínková
- Kenny .... Ondřej Tichý
- Jimmy .... Alexandr Andrej
