= Zorčič =

Zorčić and Zorčič are South Slavic surnames. Notable people with the surnames include:

- Igor Zorčič, Slovenian politician
- Pavao Zorčić (1620 – January 1685), Serbian-Croatian Greek Catholic hierarch

== See also ==
- Zorić
- Zoričić
