= Věrní abonenti =

1996 play

Věrní abonenti (Loyal members) is a Czech stage comedy play, written by Antonín Procházka and performed for the first time in 1996.

== Characters ==
- Ríša
- Petra
- Dana
- 1st Actor
- 2nd Actor
- Usher
- Alexandra
- Actress

== Productions ==
The play has been staged at the Eastern Bohemian Theatre in Pardubice and the Agentura Harlekýn in Prague, both times directed by Procházka and starring Václav Vydra as Ríša and Andrea Černá as Petra. In 1998 the play premiered at the J. K. Tyl Theatre in Plzeň. The play was also adapted into a film in 2001.
