= Jakub Kresa =

Czech mathematician (1648–1715)

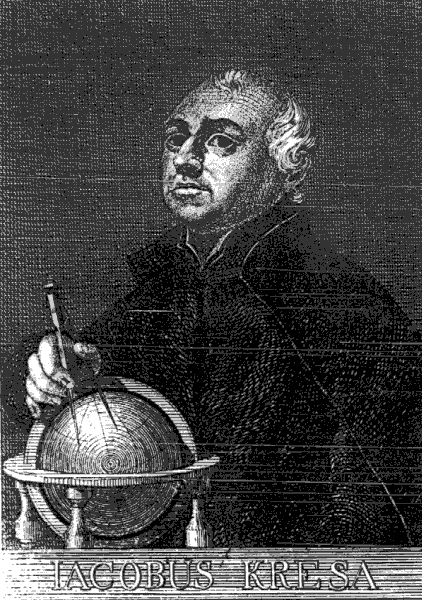
- Kresa in c. 1700
- Born: 19 July 1648; Smržice, Moravia
- Died: 28 July 1715 (aged 67); Brno, Margraviate of Moravia
- Education: University of Olomouc; Charles University
- Known for: Introducing algebraic number to trigonometry Translating Euclid's Elements to spanish, thence the nickname "Euclid of the West"
- Scientific career
- Fields: Mathematics, diplomacy
- Workplaces: University of Olomouc; Colegio Imperial de Madrid; Charles University
- Doctoral students: Karel Slavíček

Jakub Kresa (Spanish: Jacobo Kresa, Latin: Jacobo Kreysa; 19 July 1648 – 28 July 1715) was a Czech mathematician. He was one of the most important mathematicians of the Baroque era in the Kingdom of Bohemia.

== Biography ==
=== Early life ===
Jakub Kresa was born into a smallholder's family at Smržice near Prostějov. He studied at the Jesuit gymnasium (school) in Brno. There he proved to be an extraordinary student. He not only displayed rare skills in mathematics, but he also became a polyglot, able to speak fluently Hebrew, German, Latin, Italian, Spanish, French and Portuguese, in addition to his Czech mother-tongue.

In 1669–1670 he taught at the gymnasium (school) in Litoměřice. Then he went to Prague, where he studied at the Faculty of Philosophy of Charles University between 1670 and 1673. After spending a short time back in Litoměřice, he returned to Prague in 1675 and continued his studies in mathematics and theology. Kresa was ordained a priest in 1680. After this he spent a short time in Telč.

=== In the Czech Crown lands ===
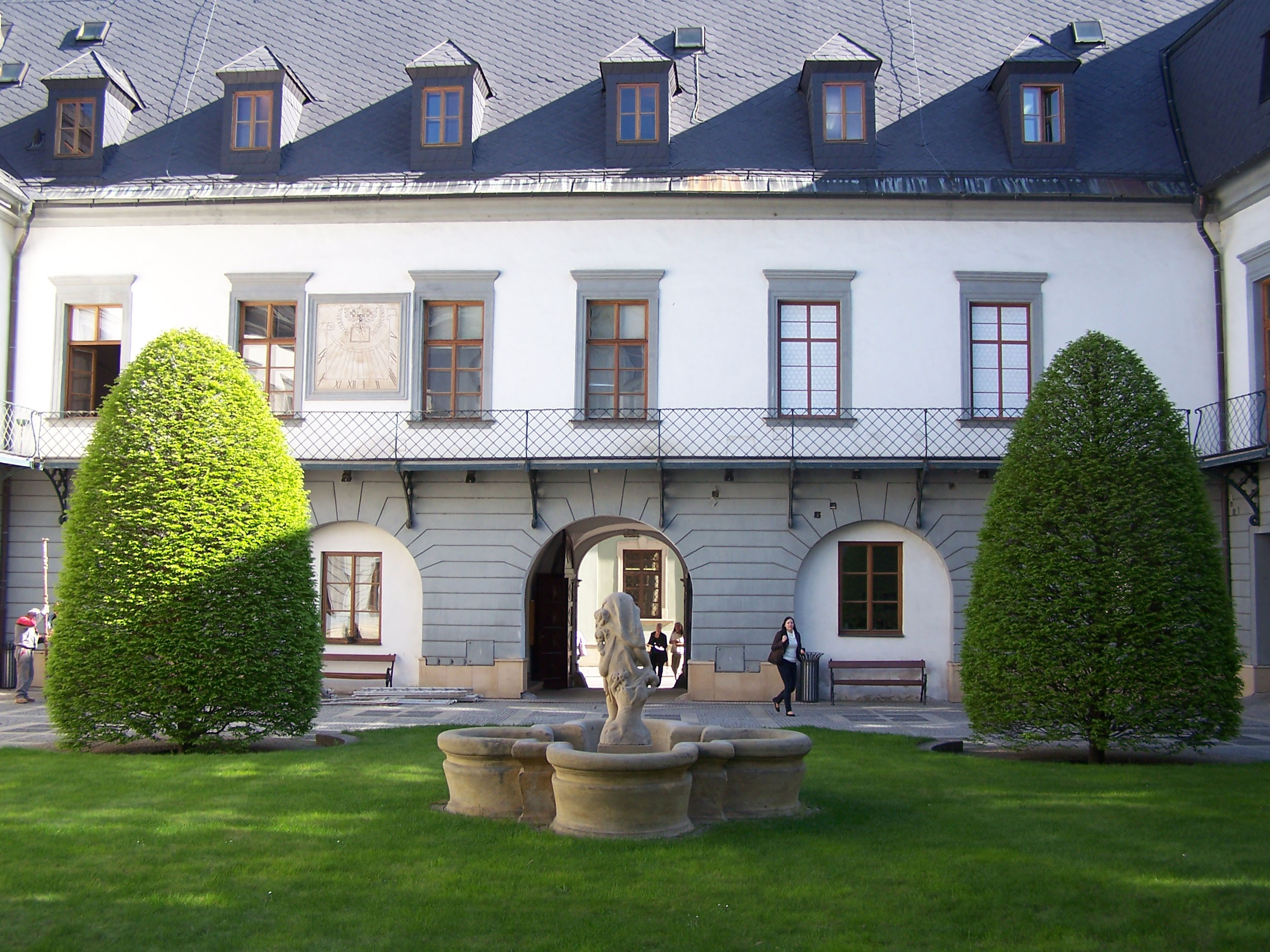
Courtyard of Philosophical Faculty of Olomouc University, at which Kresa obtained doctorate in 1680s

In 1681 Jakub Kresa started to teach Hebrew at the University of Olomouc. There he obtained his first doctorate and between 1682 and 1684 taught mathematics. In Olomouc Kresa's other high points included presiding at the academic dissertation of the mathematician and astronomer Jan Taletius, who devised a model to predict eclipses of the sun and of the moon.

Jakub Kresa was also often entrusted with diplomatic tasks. During the peasants' uprising in northern Bohemia in 1680, he served as mediator between the cavalry regiment of general Vilém Harant z Polžic and the peasant leaders.

In 1684 Kresa left Olomouc to become head of the Departments of Mathematics and of Hebreistics at the Charles University. He was also preaching at the St. Salvador church in Prague. By this time he was already well known for his extraordinary skills regarding mathematics, languages and diplomacy, and he was offered the position of head of Department of Mathematics at the Colegio Imperial de Madrid. He relocated to Spain in 1686 and stayed there for fifteen years.

=== In Spain ===
In order to make the study of mathematics easier for the Spanish students, Kresa translated the 8 books of Euclid's Elements into Spanish. This brought him recognition and he soon became renowned in the whole country, being dubbed the Euclid of the West. At that time it became a custom in Spain to let Kresa assess mathematical treatises ahead of publication. Apart from the Colegio Imperial de Madrid, Kresa was also giving lectures at the Naval academy of Cádiz.

=== Back in the Czech Crown lands ===
Following the death of spanish king Charles II in 1700 Kresa went back to Prague. He obtained a doctorate in theology at Charles University and also started to teach theology there. At the same time he was privately teaching mathematics and was acquiring mathematical apparatus for the Department of Mathematics. He was engaged in arithmetic, fractions and logarithms, trigonometry, astronomy, algebra, as well as military architecture. One of his private students, Count Ferdinand Herbert, published Kresa's ideas in magazine Acta Eruditorum in 1711.

=== Late life ===
The Emperor Leopold I appointed Kresa as confessor of his second son, the Archduke Charles. He remained in this position after Charles took over the Spanish throne, within the War of the Spanish Succession, and therefore returned to Spain with him (1704–1713). After nine years in Spain, and the defeat of Charles, Kresa went back to the Lands of the Bohemian Crown, working with the help of Karel Slavíček on mathematical theories in Brno, where he died in 1715.

== Legacy ==
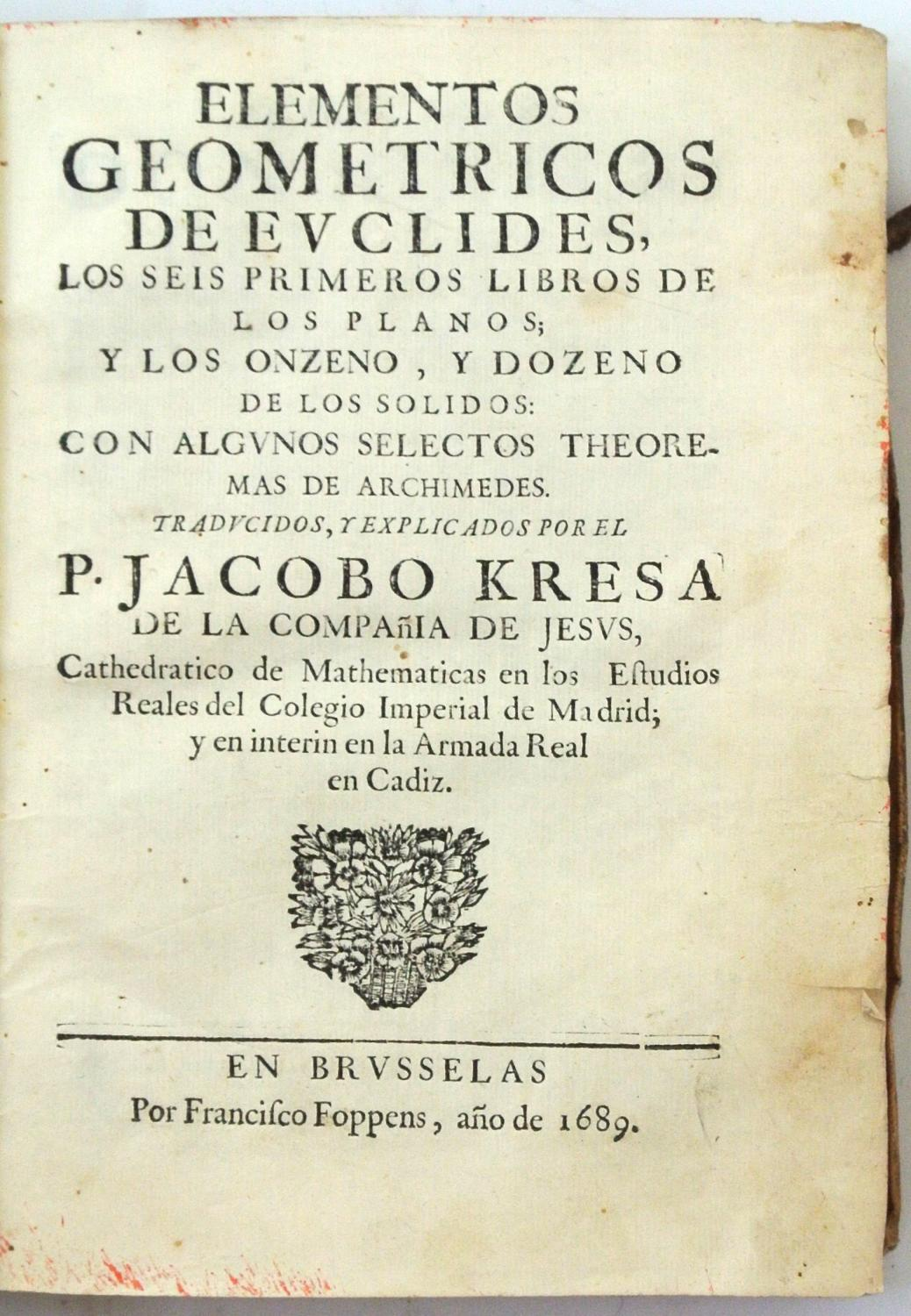
Cover of Kresa's Spanish translation of Euclides's Elements.

Kresa's manuscripts were transcribed for printing by his students František Tillisch and Karel Slavíček, who both later taught at Olomouc.

The lectures Kresa gave at Charles University were recorded by student called Kryštof John, who published them under the title Mathematica in universitate Pragensi tradica a P. Jacobo Kreysa ... excerpta anno 1685. The manuscript is today stored at the library of Strahov Monastery.

In Kresa's era the Trigonometric functions were derived using geometry. Kresa was the first to introduce algebraic number to trigonometry.

Kresa's death was followed by a decline in mathematics and science in the Czech Crown lands due to the dogmatic application of Catholic Church doctrines. With Slavíček having gone to China, scientific work largely disappeared from the Czech lands for two decades. Although the theories of Isaac Newton, Jacques Cassini and Edmond Halley were well known, local scientists (such as Josef Player or Jan Slezina) were continued to work with the obsolete theories of Ptolemaios and Aristoteles. It was only a quarter of a century later, that scientific work was resumed by peoples such as Jan Antonín Scrinci (1697–1773) and Joseph Stepling (1716–1778).

=== Major works ===
- Theses mathematicae defendidas por el Ex. mo Seňor Don Innigo de la Cruz ... en colegio de la Compaňia de Jesus de Ciudad de Cadiz, 1688
- Elementes geometricos de Euclides, los seis primeros Libros de los planos, etc., Brussels 1689
- Arithmetica Tyro-Brunensis curiosa varietate et observatione communi quidem omnium fructui, sed praeprimis Tyronibus Mathemetum utilis, Prague 1715
- Analysis speciosa trigonometriae sphericae, etc. Prague 1720
