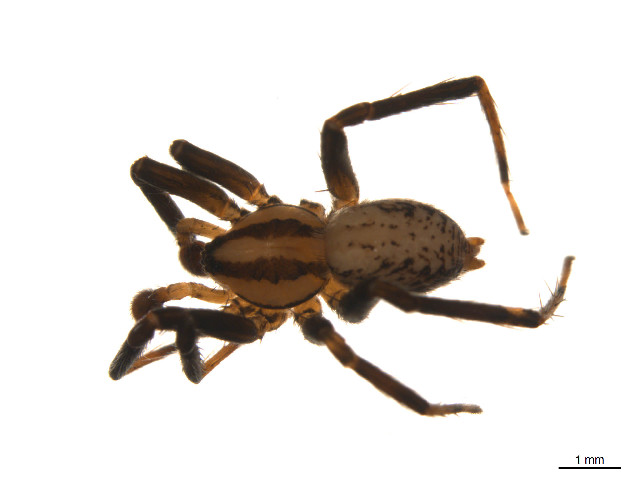
- Z. hespera, adult male

Scientific classification
- Kingdom: Animalia
- Phylum: Arthropoda
- Subphylum: Chelicerata
- Class: Arachnida
- Order: Araneae
- Infraorder: Araneomorphae
- Family: Miturgidae
- Genus: Zora
- Species: Z. hespera

Binomial name
- Zora hespera Corey & Mott, 1991

= Zora hespera =

Species of spider

Zora hespera is a species of prowling spider in the family Miturgidae. It is found in the United States and Canada.
