= Celebrity s.r.o. =

Celebrity s.r.o. (English: Celebrity, Inc) is a comedy play written by actor and director Antonín Procházka. The play premiered in 2008 in the J. K. Tyl Theatre in Plzeň, Czech Republic

== Story ==
The main character, Emil, witnesses a crime in a television studio. His life is changed, as he is forced to leave Eastern Slovakia and the girl he loves.

== Cast: J. K. Tyl Theatre production ==
- Directed by Antonín Procházka
- Jana: Štěpánka Křesťanová
- Emil: Antonín Procházka
- Boss: Monika Švábová
- Alan: Pavel Pavlovský
- Kamil: Vilém Dubnička
- Adéla: Andrea Černá
- Captain Kalina: Michal Štěrba
- Journalist: Jana Kubátová
- Miloš: Zdeněk Rohlíček
- Dasha: Veronika Holubová
