= Karel Slavíček =

Czech scientist and missionary to China (1678–1735)

- 嚴嘉樂
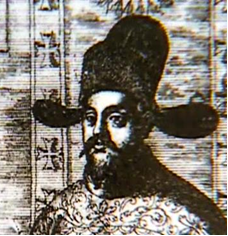
- Born: 24 December 1678; Jimramov, Margraviate of Moravia
- Died: 24 August 1735 (aged 56); Beijing, China
- Education: University of Olomouc
- Known for: Drawing first precise map of Beijing; First Czech sinologist
- Scientific career
- Fields: Cartography, Hebreistics, astronomy, mathematics, musicology, sinology
- Workplaces: Royal Court of Kangxi Emperor
- Doctoral advisor: Jakub Kresa

Karel Slavíček (simplified Chinese: 严嘉乐; traditional Chinese: 嚴嘉樂; pinyin: Yán Jiālè; 12 December 1678 – 24 September 1735) was a Jesuit missionary and scientist, the first Czech sinologist and author of the first precise map of Beijing.

== Biography ==
=== Early life and studies in the Czech lands ===
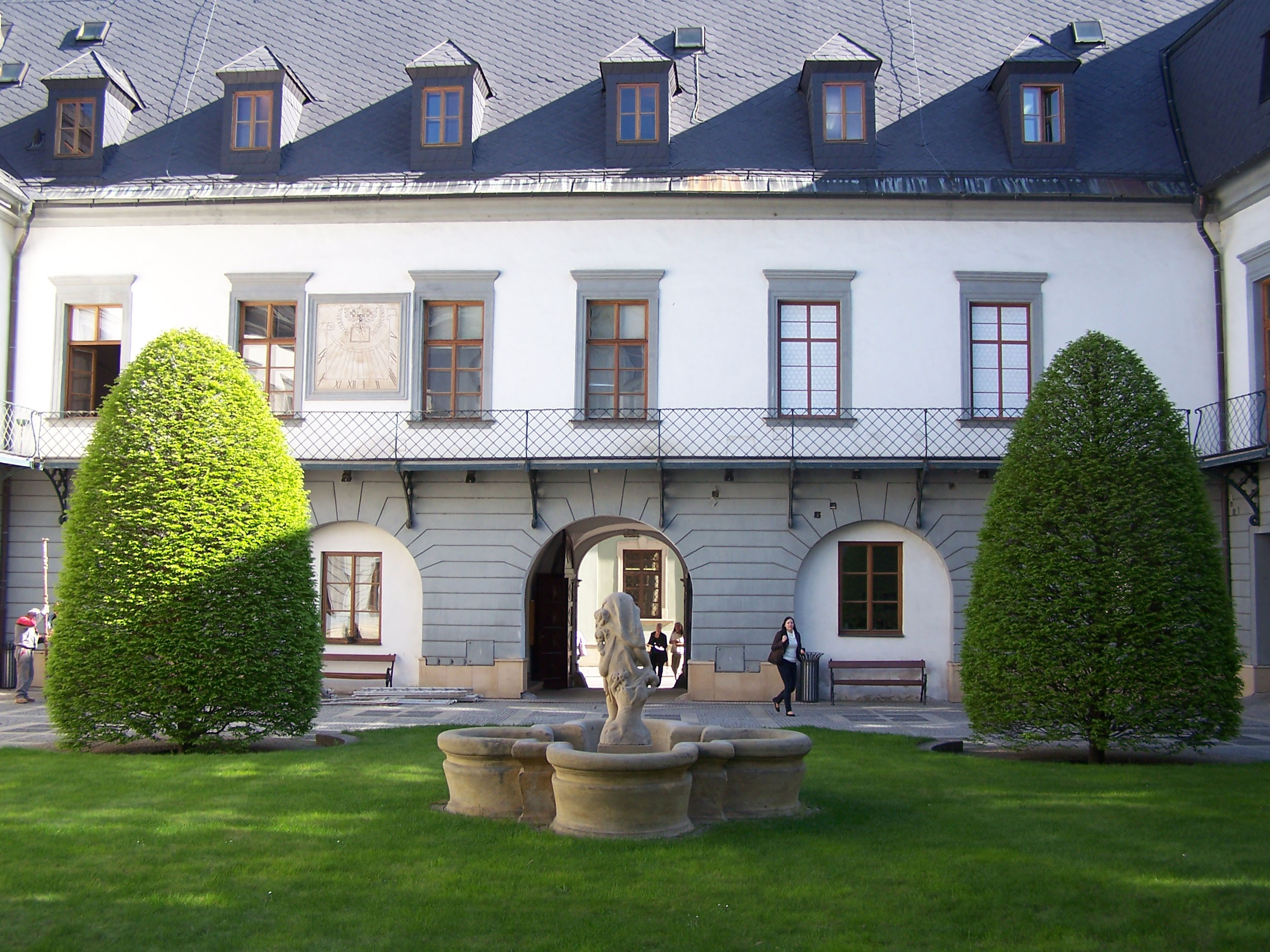
Courtyard of Faculty of Arts of the Olomouc University, at which Slavíček obtained doctorate in 1712

Karel Slavíček was born in a house called Czech: U Slunce ("By the Sun") on the main square in Jimramov, a small town straddling the historical border between Bohemia and Moravia. His father, Václav Vojtěch Slavíček, was a teacher and town councillor writer. After finishing Gymnasium (school) in Brno, Slavíček entered the Jesuit order as a novice in 1694. Later he studied at Faculty of Philosophy and Faculty of Theology of Olomouc University. After finishing his studies, he stayed at the University as a teacher of mathematics and Hebrew language and history. Later he went to Prague, where he studied Theology at Charles University. He was ordained as a priest in 1707. Astronomy soon became his hobby. During his studies in Prague Slavíček took part in making a precise map of the capital.

After finishing studies in Prague he went to teach in Jičín, subsequently lecturing mathematics at the University of Wrocław, finally also returning to the University of Olomouc, where he obtained Doctorate of Philosophy, became professor of mathematics and, in 1712, a fully-fledged member of the Jesuit order. In 1714 he went to Brno, where his work involved assisting his former Olomouc professor Jakub Kresa. Soon after this, he decided to become missionary. Because of his knowledge of mathematics as well as music, it was decided that he should be sent to China.

In 1715 he left Brno for Prague, where he joined Ignaz Kögler. Together they went to Lisbon, where they joined with a Jesuit from Portugal. On 13 March 1716, they left for China. It took them 170 days to get there, surviving a major storm, during which many of their belongings were damaged.

=== In China ===
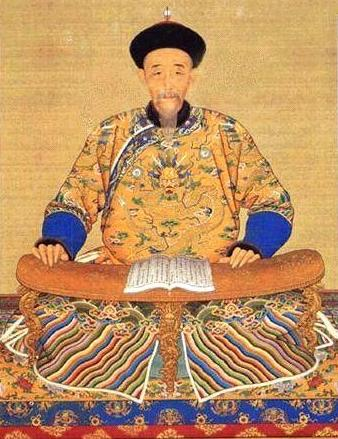
Depiction of Kangxi Emperor, who ordered Slavíček to make a precise map of Beijing in 1717

After reaching Macao they acquired local clothes and adopted local haircuts. On 3 February 1717, Slavíček was introduced to the Kangxi Emperor in Beijing, who employed him as a court musician. (Slavíček was a Spinet player).

In 1717 Slavíček made the first precise map of Beijing, putting to use know-how obtained previously while working on the map of Prague. At the same time he clarified the latitude of Beijing.

Slavíček soon became ill and left Beijing in order to recover away from the city. Meanwhile, the Kangxi Emperor was succeeded in 1722 by the Yongzheng Emperor, who was much less friendly towards Christians. Yongzheng ordered all the Jesuits in China to be accommodated in Beijing: consequently, Slavíček had to return there.

Slavíček learned the Chinese language rather fast. He worked on astronomy and mathematics and compiled a Treatise on Chinese music: however, this treatise has not survived. Although forced to move back to Beijing, Slavíček did not become isolated. Indeed, he was in frequent contact by letter with European scientists, such as Stéphane Souciet and Guillaume de L'Isle. Many of the letters have been lost, but those that survive provide insight into Slavíček's life in China, and are now housed in the library of Strahov Monastery.

Slavíček died after 18 years in China; he was succeeded by another Czech Jesuit, Jan Walter of Bílina.

Asteroid 31124 Slavicek is named after him.
