= Velká Lhota =

- Municipality
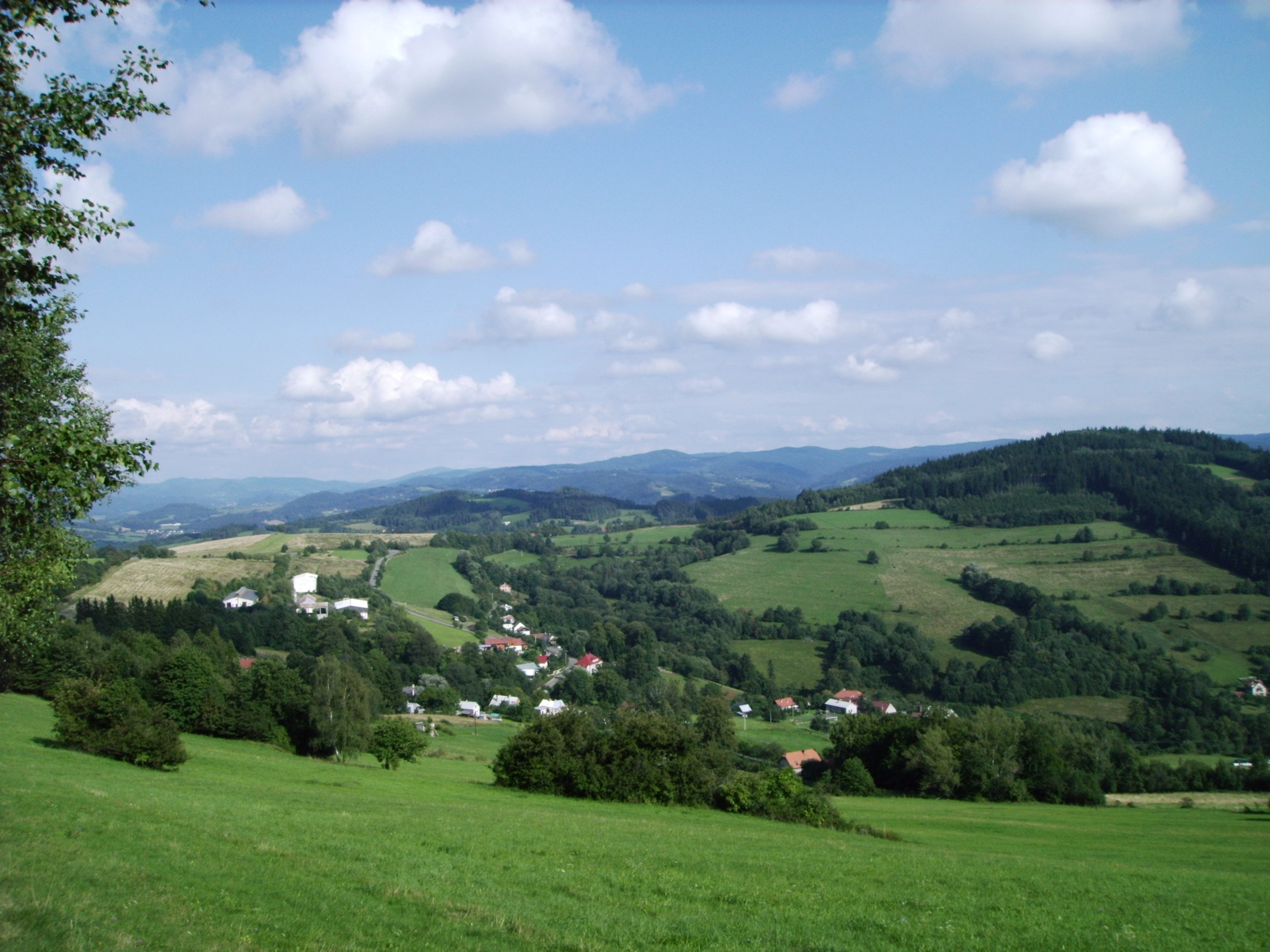
- View from the west

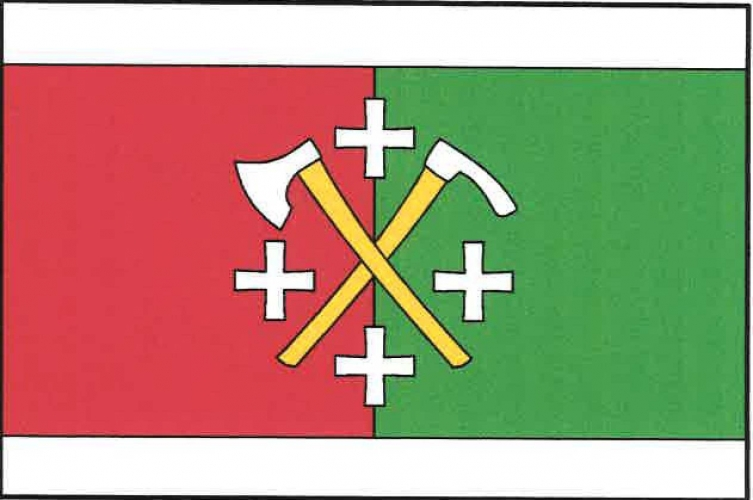
- Flag Coat of arms

- Location in the Czech Republic
- Coordinates: 49°26′16″N 18°2′8″E
- Country: Czech Republic
- Region: Zlín
- District: Vsetín
- First mentioned: 1374

Area
  - Total: 9.33 km^{2} (3.60 sq mi)
- Elevation: 540 m (1,770 ft)

Population (2026-01-01)
  - Total: 535
  - Density: 57.3/km^{2} (149/sq mi)
- Time zone: UTC+1 (CET)
  - Summer (DST): UTC+2 (CEST)
- Postal code: 757 01
- Website: www.velkalhota.cz

Velká Lhota (Czech pronunciation: [ˈvɛlkaː ˈlɦota]) is a municipality and village in Vsetín District in the Zlín Region of the Czech Republic. It has about 500 inhabitants. The municipality is located on the Bystřička Stream in the Hostýn-Vsetín Mountains. The main landmark of Velká Lhota is the local wooden Evangelical church, which is protected as a national cultural monument.

== Administrative division ==
Velká Lhota consists of two municipal parts (in brackets population according to the 2021 census):

- Velká Lhota (376)
- Malá Lhota (101)

== Etymology ==
Lhota is a common Czech toponym. Velká Lhota means 'great Lhota' and Malá Lhota means 'small Lhota'.

== Geography ==
Velká Lhota is located about 11 kilometres (7 mi) north of Vsetín and 35 km (22 mi) northeast of Zlín. It lies in the Hostýn-Vsetín Mountains. The highest point is the hill Vrchhůra at 692 m (2,270 ft) above sea level. The Bystřička Stream flows along the southern municipal border and the Bystřička Reservoir is built on it. The western part of the municipal territory lies in the Beskydy Protected Landscape Area.

== History ==
The first written mention of Velká Lhota is from 1374, when it was part of the Krásno estate. From 1411 until the establishment of an independent municipality in 1848, the village belonged to the Rožnov estate.

== Demographics ==
Historical population

Year	Pop.	±%
1869	932	—
1880	883	−5.3%
1890	853	−3.4%
1900	887	+4.0%
1910	945	+6.5%

Year	Pop.	±%
1921	887	−6.1%
1930	879	−0.9%
1950	693	−21.2%
1961	681	−1.7%
1970	621	−8.8%

Year	Pop.	±%
1980	465	−25.1%
1991	417	−10.3%
2001	404	−3.1%
2011	459	+13.6%
2021	477	+3.9%

Source: Censuses

== Transport ==
There are no railways or major roads passing through the municipality.

== Sights ==
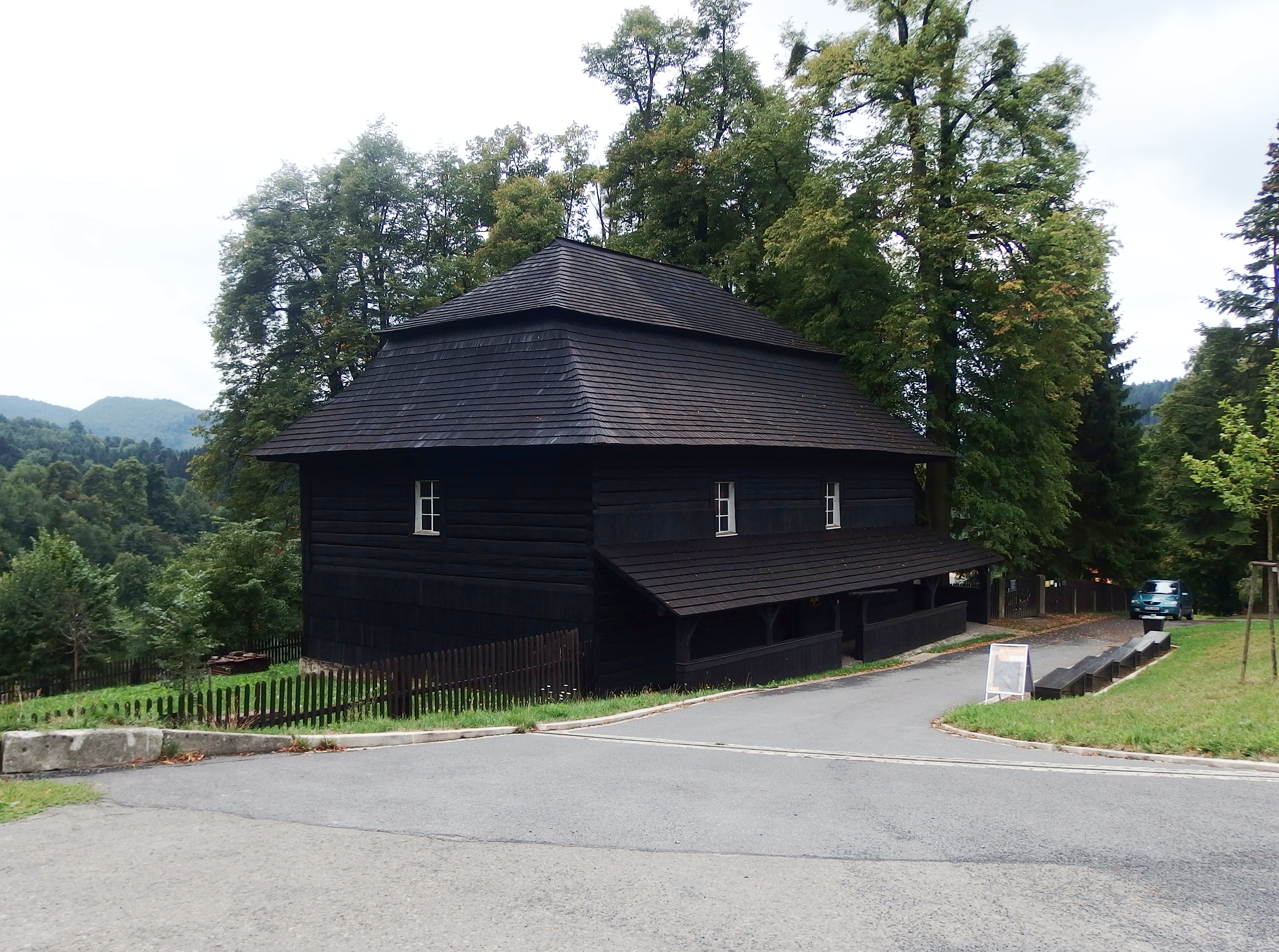
Evangelical church

The main landmark of Velká Lhota is the local Evangelical church. It is a wooden prayer house, built in the vernacular architecture in 1783. It is the only wooden prayer house from the era of the Patent of Toleration in the world that has been preserved in its original form. It is protected as a national cultural monument.

== Notable people ==
- Jan Karafiát (1846–1929), children's book writer; lived and worked here in 1875–1895
