= Smržice =

- Municipality
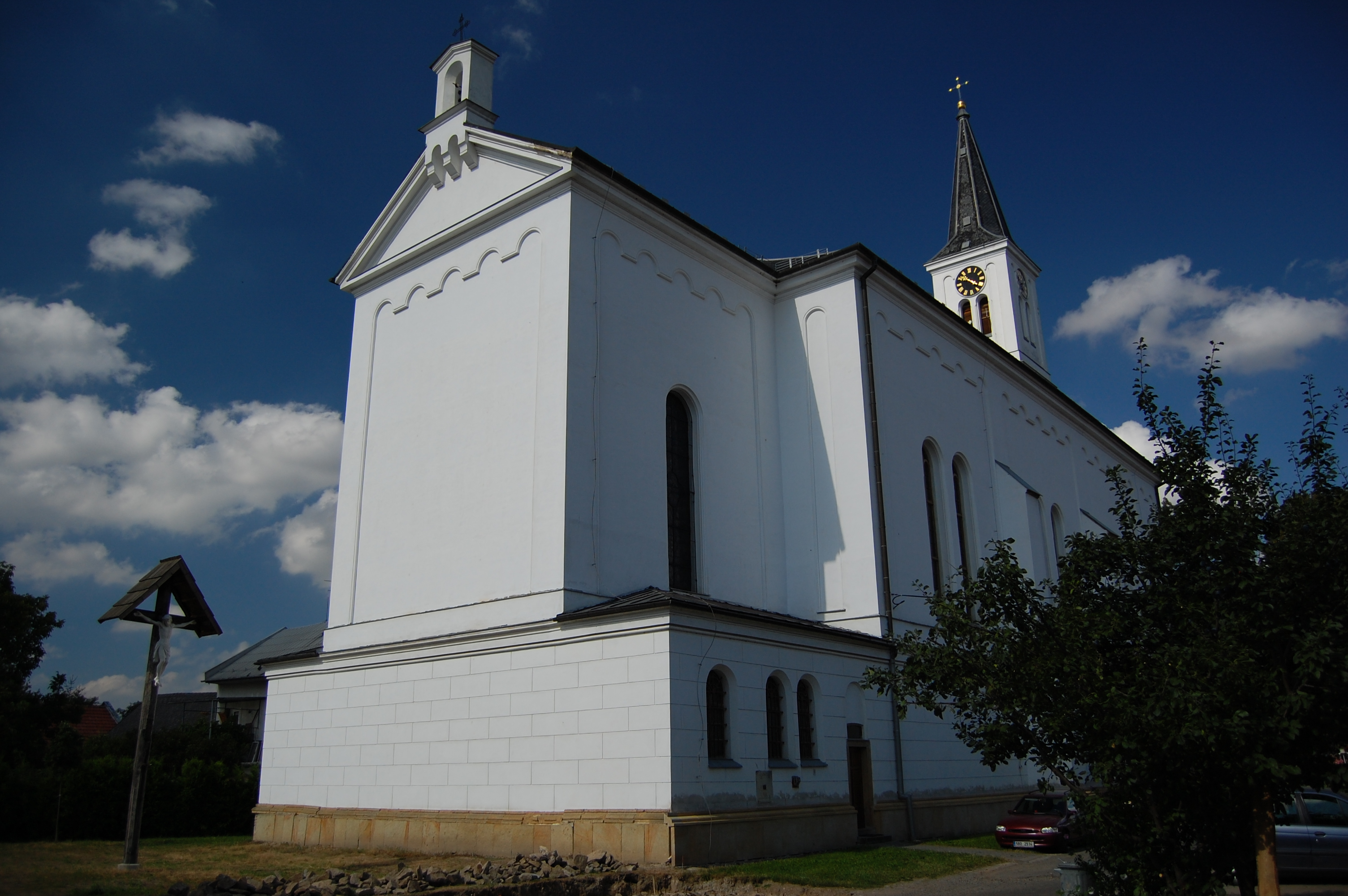
- Church of Saints Peter and Paul

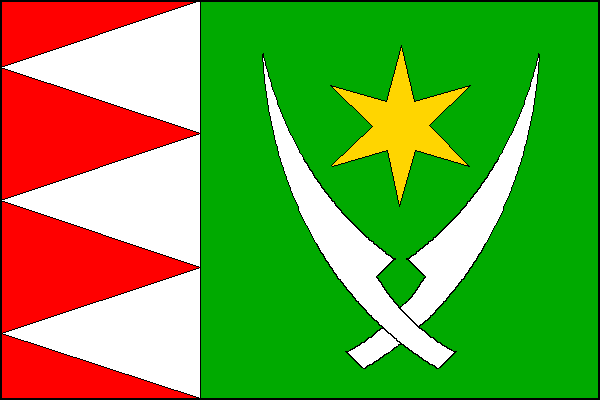
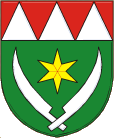
- Flag Coat of arms

- Location in the Czech Republic
- Coordinates: 49°30′21″N 17°6′25″E
- Country: Czech Republic
- Region: Olomouc
- District: Prostějov
- First mentioned: 1141

Area
  - Total: 12.55 km^{2} (4.85 sq mi)
- Elevation: 224 m (735 ft)

Population (2026-01-01)
  - Total: 1,667
  - Density: 132.8/km^{2} (344.0/sq mi)
- Time zone: UTC+1 (CET)
  - Summer (DST): UTC+2 (CEST)
- Postal code: 798 17
- Website: www.smrzice.cz

Smržice is a municipality and village in Prostějov District in the Olomouc Region of the Czech Republic. It has about 1,700 inhabitants.

Smržice lies approximately 4 kilometres (2 mi) north of Prostějov, 15 km (9.3 mi) south-west of Olomouc, and 204 km (127 mi) east of Prague.

== Demographics ==
Historical population
Year	Pop.	±%
1869	1,335	—
1880	1,480	+10.9%
1890	1,592	+7.6%
1900	1,646	+3.4%
1910	1,803	+9.5%
1921	1,882	+4.4%
1930	1,992	+5.8%
1950	1,664	−16.5%
1961	1,829	+9.9%
1970	1,602	−12.4%
1980	1,564	−2.4%
1991	1,560	−0.3%
2001	1,555	−0.3%
2011	1,602	+3.0%
2021	1,539	−3.9%
Source: Censuses

== Notable people ==
- Jakub Kresa (1648–1715), mathematician
