= Vilém Mrštík =

Czech writer (1863–1912)

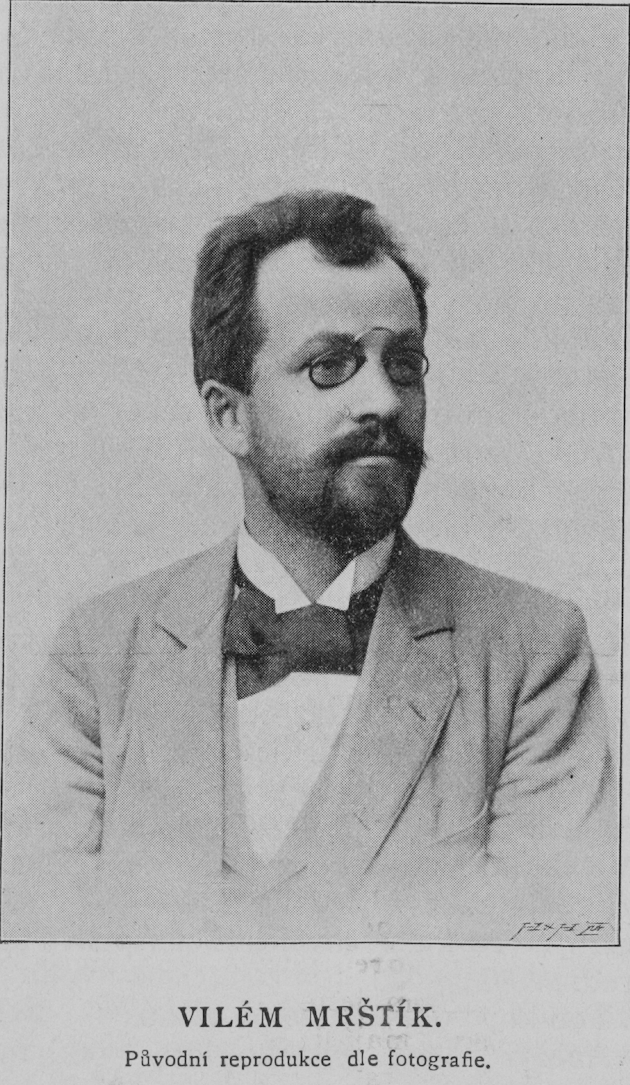
- Mrštík in 1897
- Born: 14 May 1863; Jimramov, Moravia, Austrian Empire
- Died: 2 March 1912 (aged 48); Diváky, Moravia, Austria-Hungary
- Resting place: Diváky
- Occupations: Writer, dramatist
- Relatives: Alois Mrštík, brother
- Writing career
- Language: Czech
- Notable works: Maryša; Santa Lucia
- Literary movement: Naturalism, Realism

Vilém Mrštík (Czech pronunciation: [ˈvɪlɛːm ˈmr̩ʃciːk]; 14 May 1863 – 2 March 1912) was a Czech writer and dramatist.

== Life and career ==
Mrštík was born on 14 May 1863 in Jimramov, Moravia, Austrian Empire. He is known for his novel Santa Lucia (1893). With his brother, Alois (1861–1925) he also wrote the drama Maryša (1894). This play, set in rural Moravia, explored gender roles and tradition in a small village. In contrast to the more positive renderings of rural life by the writers of the Czech National Revival, the brothers attempted a more impartial view of life in the countryside.

He is also famous for having fought against the mass destruction of historic buildings carried out as part of urban renewal plans for parts of Prague by publishing two influential essays: Manifest to the Czech People (1896), and Bestia triumphans in 1897.

Mrštík died on 2 March 1912 in Diváky, after he committed suicide. He was buried in Diváky.

== Works ==
- Paní Urbanová (Mrs Urbanová) 1889, drama
- Santa Lucia 1893, novel
- Obrázky (Pictures) 1894, anthology
- Maryša 1895, drama, written with his brother, Alois Mrštík
- Pohádka máje (A May Tale) 1897, novel
- Anežka (Agnes) 1912, drama
