= Zora pumila =

Scientific classification
- Kingdom: Animalia
- Phylum: Arthropoda
- Subphylum: Chelicerata
- Class: Arachnida
- Order: Araneae
- Infraorder: Araneomorphae
- Family: Miturgidae
- Genus: Zora
- Species: Z. pumila

Binomial name
- Zora pumila (Hentz, 1850)

Species of spider

Zora pumila is a species of prowling spider in the family Miturgidae. It is found in the USA.
