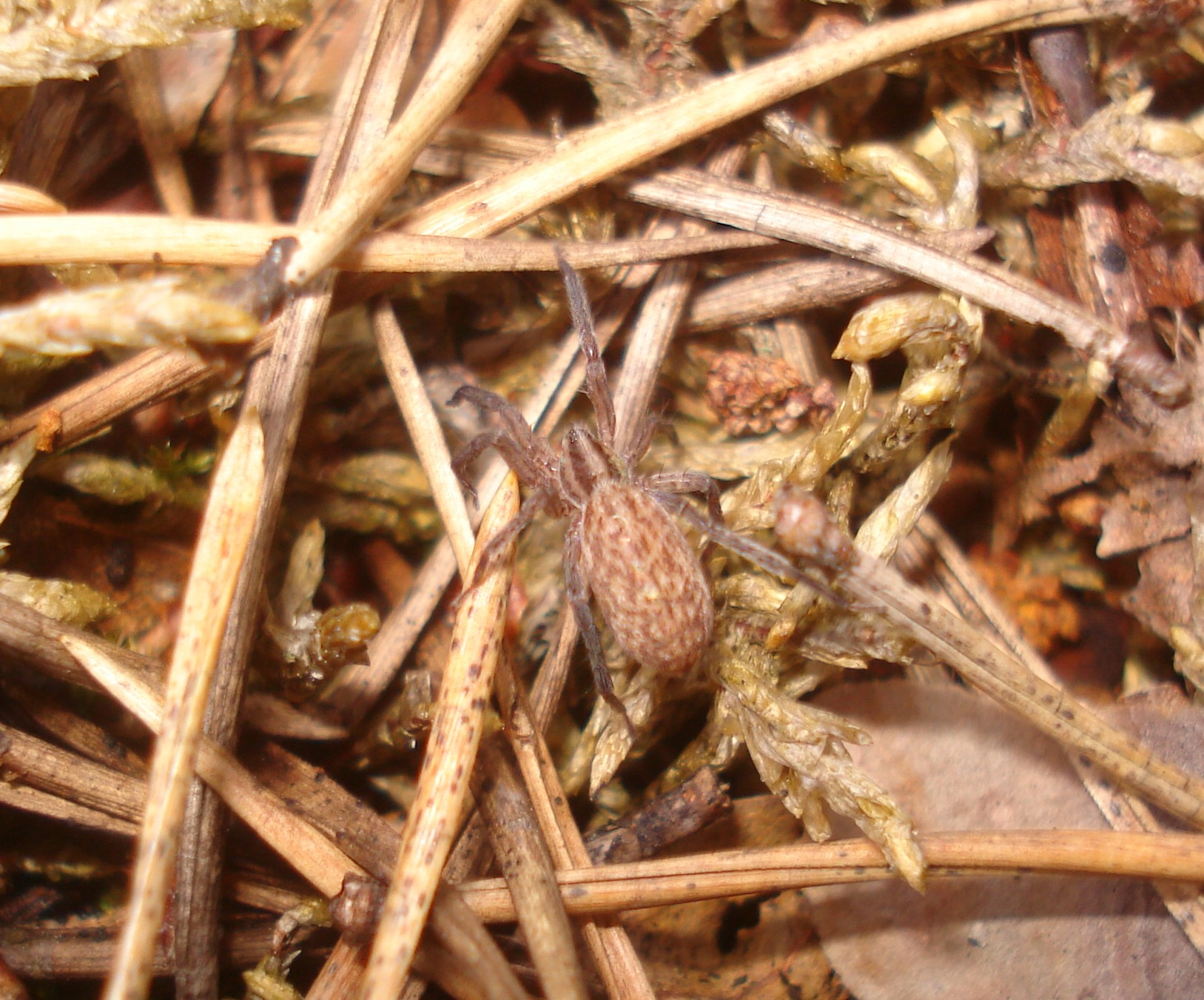
- Zora silvestris in Ķemeri National Park, Latvia

Scientific classification
- Kingdom: Animalia
- Phylum: Arthropoda
- Subphylum: Chelicerata
- Class: Arachnida
- Order: Araneae
- Infraorder: Araneomorphae
- Family: Miturgidae
- Genus: Zora
- Species: Z. silvestris

Binomial name
- Zora silvestris Kulczyński, 1897

= Zora silvestris =

Species of spider

Zora silvestris is a prowling spider in the family Miturgidae which is found in Europe and Central Asia.

== Description ==
The females are 5 to 7.7 mm (1/5 to 3/10 in) in length, the males 3 to 4 mm (1/12 to 1/6 in). The epigyne has a quite distinct groove. This species and the related Zora spinimana are difficult to identify from each other, Z. silvestris is more grey coloured than the warm yellow colouration of Z. spinimana. The darker legs of Z. silvestris are usually quite obvious. The two dark lateral bands on the carapace of Z. silvestris are broader than those on Z. spinimana and the prosoma on Z. silvestris is more contrastingly marked. Z. silvestris has two pairs of spines on metatarsi I and II, the other species of Zora in Britain have three.

== Biology and Habitat ==
In Great Britain, Zora silvestris occurs on dry heathland, most commonly encountered in mature heather. A stronghold of the species is Sherwood Forest where it is found with larger numbers of Zora spinimana in mixed heather and grassland where the encroaching scrub had been cleared. Adults of both sexes are found from May to July, although a female has been recorded in September.

== Distribution ==
Zora silvestris is found from western Europe eastwards into central Asia. In Europe, it is a widespread species from western and central regions and north into Sweden although encountered infrequently. In Great Britain it is rare, recorded from five sites in southern England, the most northerly being Sherwood Forest. The species rarity may be exaggerated due to the difficulty of distinguishing it from Zora spinimana.
