= Jimramov =

- Market town
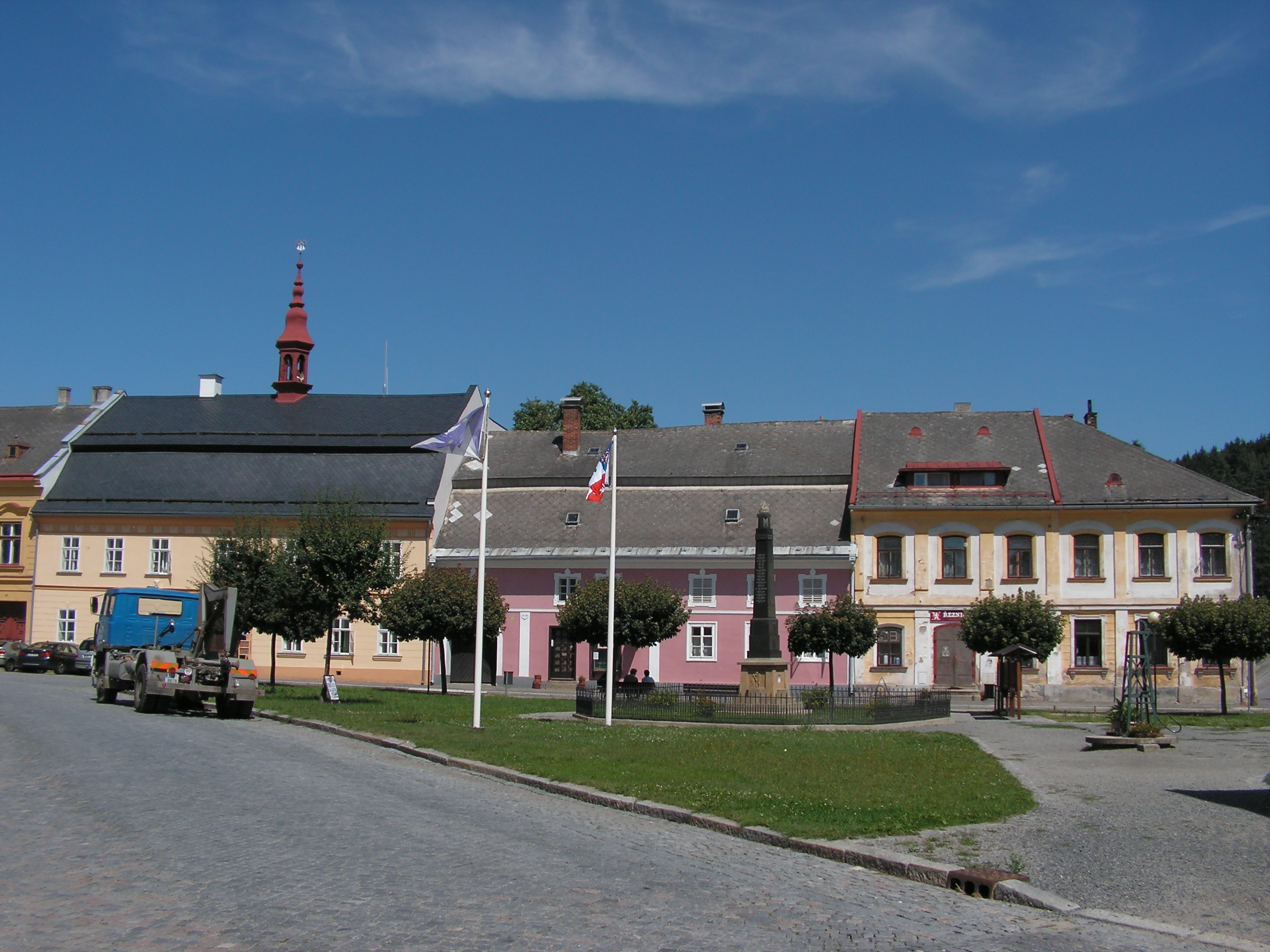
- The square Náměstí Jana Karafiáta

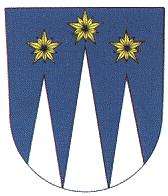
- Flag Coat of arms

- Location in the Czech Republic
- Coordinates: 49°38′14″N 16°13′35″E
- Country: Czech Republic
- Region: Vysočina
- District: Žďár nad Sázavou
- First mentioned: 1361

Area
  - Total: 22.02 km^{2} (8.50 sq mi)
- Elevation: 495 m (1,624 ft)

Population (2026-01-01)
  - Total: 1,168
  - Density: 53.04/km^{2} (137.4/sq mi)
- Time zone: UTC+1 (CET)
  - Summer (DST): UTC+2 (CEST)
- Postal code: 592 42
- Website: www.jimramov.cz

Jimramov (Czech pronunciation: [ˈjɪmramof]; German: Ingrowitz) is a market town in Žďár nad Sázavou District in the Vysočina Region of the Czech Republic. It has about 1,200 inhabitants. The historic town centre is well preserved and is protected as an urban monument zone.

== Administrative division ==
Jimramov consists of five municipal parts (in brackets population according to the 2021 census):

- Jimramov (650)
- Benátky (208)
- Sedliště (109)
- Trhonice (60)
- Ubušín (89)

== Geography ==
Jimramov is located about 22 kilometres (14 mi) east of Žďár nad Sázavou and 52 km (32 mi) northwest of Brno. It lies in the Upper Svratka Highlands, on the border of the Žďárské vrchy Protected Landscape Area. The highest point is the hill Pavlův kopec at 714 m (2,343 ft) above sea level. The Svratka River flows through the market town.

== History ==
The first written mention of Jimramov is from 1361. A fortress in Jimramov is documented in 1392. In 1537, Jimramov was promoted to a market town by King Ferdinand I. Until 1588, the estate was owned by the Pernštejn family, who sold it to Pavel Katharin of Kathar. This nobleman chose Jimramov as his seat and had the town hall and a castle built here.

Jimramov reached the greatest prosperity in the 18th century. It became the cultural centre of evangelicals. From 1778 until 1948, the castle was owned by the Italian noble family of Belcredi. In 1991, the Belcredi family regained the castle in restitution.

== Demographics ==
Historical population

Year	Pop.	±%
1869	2,233	—
1880	2,307	+3.3%
1890	2,300	−0.3%
1900	2,328	+1.2%
1910	2,421	+4.0%

Year	Pop.	±%
1921	2,332	−3.7%
1930	2,216	−5.0%
1950	1,723	−22.2%
1961	1,796	+4.2%
1970	1,628	−9.4%

Year	Pop.	±%
1980	1,454	−10.7%
1991	1,290	−11.3%
2001	1,211	−6.1%
2011	1,169	−3.5%
2021	1,116	−4.5%

Source: Censuses

== Transport ==
There are no railways or major roads passing through the municipality.

== Sights ==
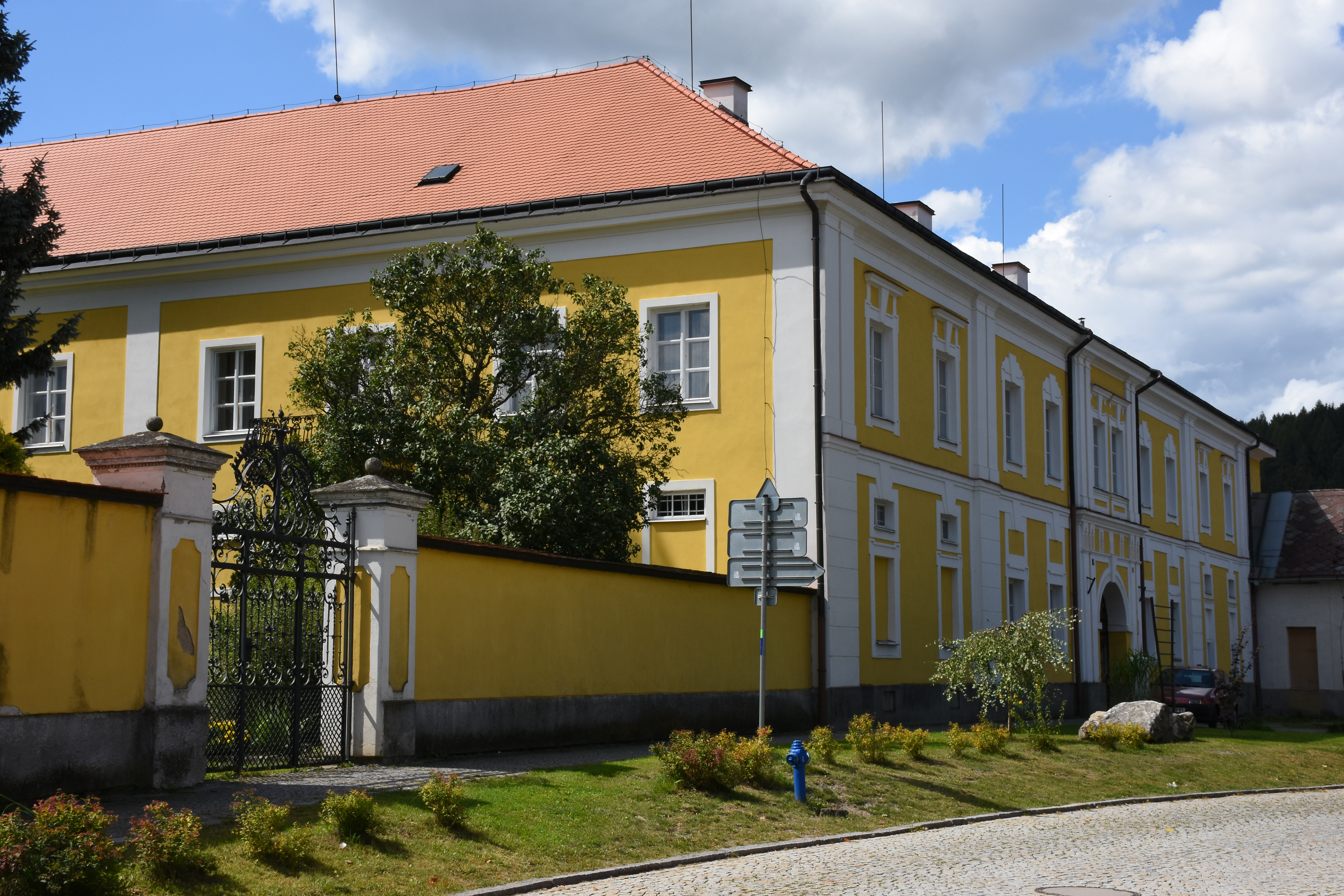
Jimramov Castle

The Jimramov Castle was built in the Renaissance style in 1593. The northern wing was added in the 18th century and the western wing in the 19th century. The castle complex includes the neo-Gothic tomb of the Belcredi family from 1869. The castle is inaccessible to the public.

The Church of the Nativity of the Virgin Mary is as old as the market town. The tower was added in 1506 and the originally Romanesque building was rebuilt in the Baroque style in 1707–1715. In the 18th century, it was connected by a corridor to the castle.

== Notable people ==
- Karel Slavíček (1678–1735), sinologist and scientist
- Count Richard Belcredi (1823–1902), Austrian civil servant and statesman
- Jan Karafiát (1846–1929), children's book writer
- Alois Mrštík (1861–1925), writer
- Vilém Mrštík (1863–1912), writer

== Twin towns – sister cities ==
Jimramov is twinned with:

- Meyrargues, France
