= Maryša =

Czech stage drama

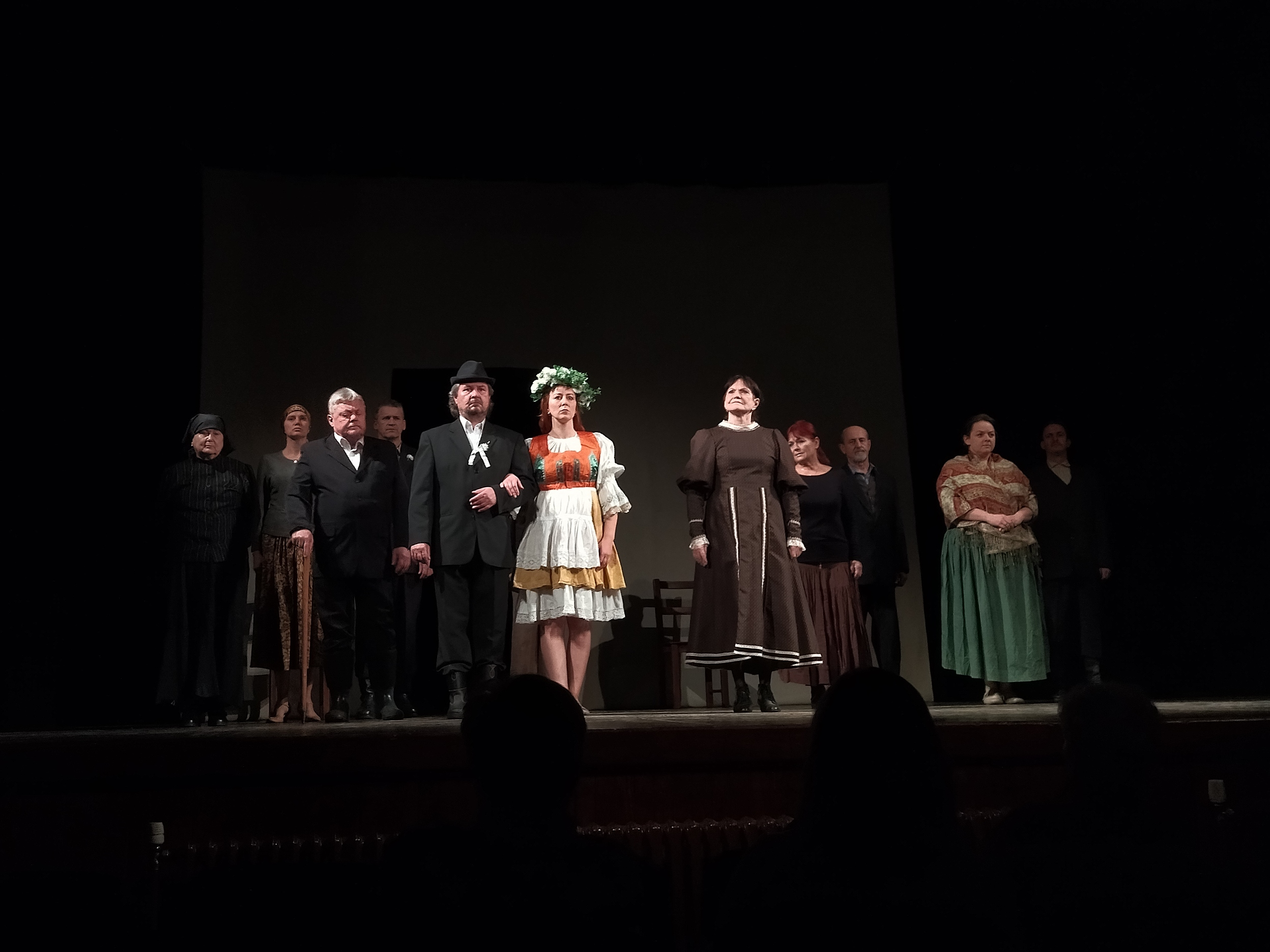
Maryša, Orfeum Kadaň, Czech Republic

Maryša (English: Marysha) is a Czech stage drama from 1894, written by brothers Alois Mrštík and Vilém Mrštík. It is set in a village in Moravia and focuses on the marriage of the eponymous character and its consequences.

== Plot ==
A young woman, Maryša, is promised by her father to Vávra, whose previous wife has died. This not only affects Maryša, but also Francek, the young man who loves her, who decides to leave the village to go to war rather than remain to see Maryša marry Vávra. The play also examines how the marriage affects the family dynamics, such as her grandmother's weakness and inability to help her granddaughter.

== Characters ==
- Maryša
- Francek
- Lízal
- Lízalová
- Vávra
- Rosara
- Grandma
- Recruiter Krištofl
- Strouhlka
- Hillman
- Franěk
- Buček
- Neighbour
- Girls, Recruiters, Taverners

== Productions ==
The play was adapted into a film of the same name by Josef Rovenský in 1935.

A production of the play directed by Michal Lang opened on 21 January 2006 at the Antonín Dvořák Theatre, Ostrava, starring Gabriela Mikulková in the title role. A production of the play directed by Alena Pešková opened on 14 March 2009 at the J. K. Tyl Theatre in Plzeň. Zuzana Hradilová and Ivona Jeličová starred in the leading role during its run.
