= Klíče na neděli =

Czech comedy play

Klíče na neděli (Keys on Sunday) is a Czech comedy play by Antonín Procházka.

== Plot ==
Two couples met at an unsuccessful party. It is revealed that all four of them are in stereotypical marriages. They get drunk, swap partners and exchange keys. A rich aunt comes from Switzerland, and after an awkward lunch with in-laws, a cuckolded husband arrives to punish his wife's infidelity, as well as the wife of an influential official who comes to save what she sees as her daughter's slumming. The plot gets complicated with many misunderstandings, and it can be regarded as a farce. The order is restored happily, even though everyone did not get what they wanted.

== Characters ==
- Luisa Puckailerová
- Ing. Jindřich Dostál
- M.D. Irena Dostálová
- Karel Kartouch
- Dana Kartouchová
- Jindřich's mother
- Model
- Lover
- Husband
- Ms. Urbanová

== Productions ==
A production opened at Branické Divadlo in Prague on 5 June 2008, directed by Antonín Procházka. Notable cast members included Milena Dvorská in the role of Luisa Puckailerová, and Mahulena Bočanová and Lucie Zedníčková, both of whom played Dana Kartouchová.

On 31 December 2008, the play opened at Divadlo, directed by Jiří Havlín, in the town Hluboká nad Vltavou within the Southern Bohemian District in the Czech Republic.
