= Diváky =

- Municipality
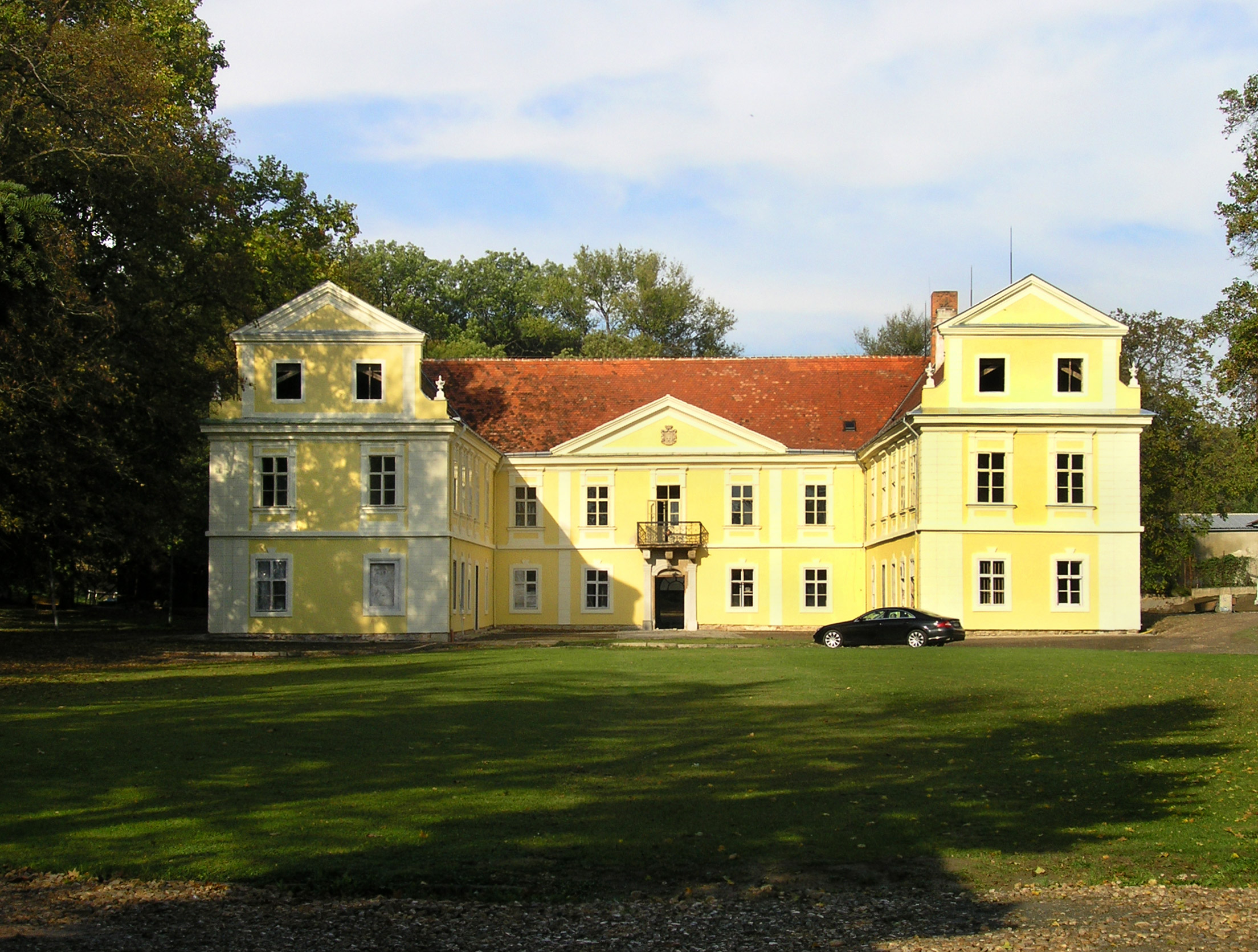
- Diváky Castle

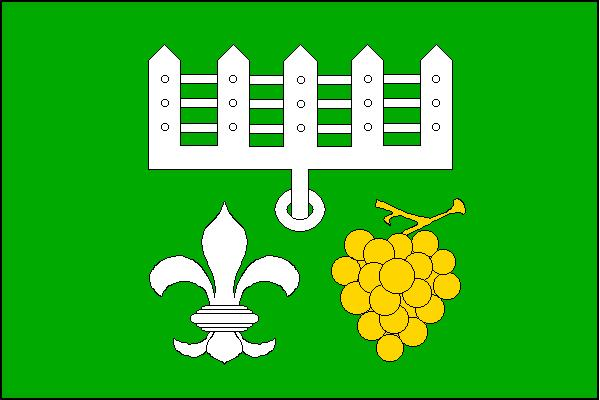
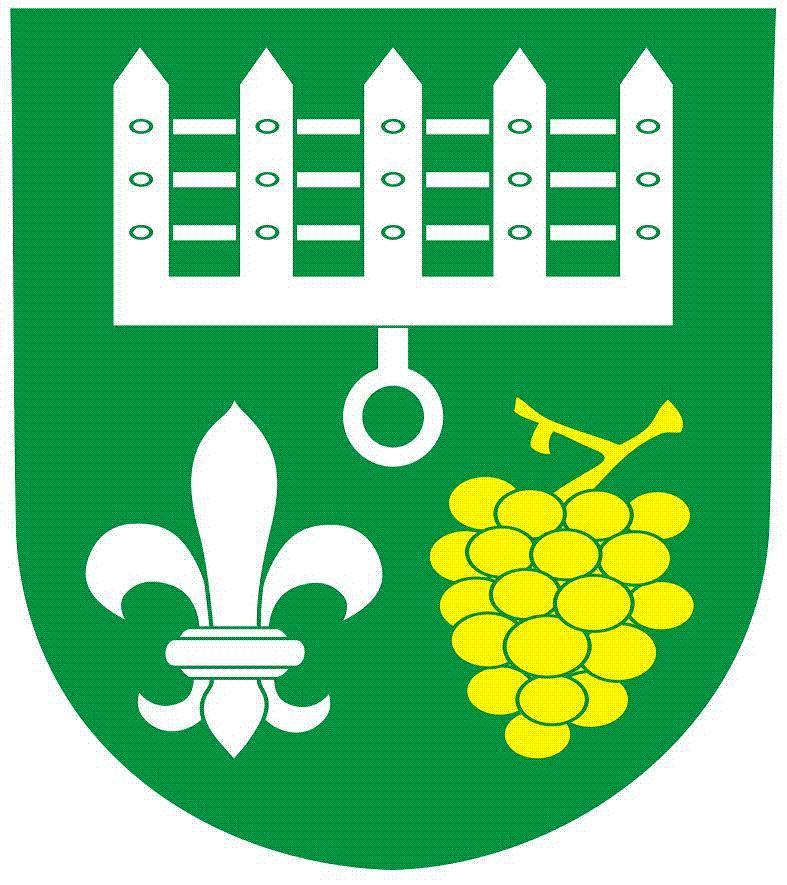
- Flag Coat of arms

- Location in the Czech Republic
- Coordinates: 48°59′19″N 16°47′30″E
- Country: Czech Republic
- Region: South Moravian
- District: Břeclav
- First mentioned: 1237

Area
  - Total: 8.49 km^{2} (3.28 sq mi)
- Elevation: 233 m (764 ft)

Population (2026-01-01)
  - Total: 507
  - Density: 59.7/km^{2} (155/sq mi)
- Time zone: UTC+1 (CET)
  - Summer (DST): UTC+2 (CEST)
- Postal code: 691 71
- Website: www.divaky.cz

Diváky is a municipality and village in Břeclav District in the South Moravian Region of the Czech Republic. It has about 500 inhabitants.

== History ==
The first written mention of Diváky is from 1237.

== Demographics ==
Historical population
Year	Pop.	±%
1869	792	—
1880	749	−5.4%
1890	791	+5.6%
1900	816	+3.2%
1910	751	−8.0%
1921	779	+3.7%
1930	800	+2.7%
1950	689	−13.9%
1961	606	−12.0%
1970	559	−7.8%
1980	529	−5.4%
1991	445	−15.9%
2001	470	+5.6%
2011	518	+10.2%
2021	523	+1.0%
Source: Censuses

== Notable people ==
- Alois Mrštík (1861–1925), writer; lived and worked here
- Vilém Mrštík (1863–1912), writer; lived and died here
