= Antonín Procházka (actor) =

Czech actor, playwright, and director (born 1953)

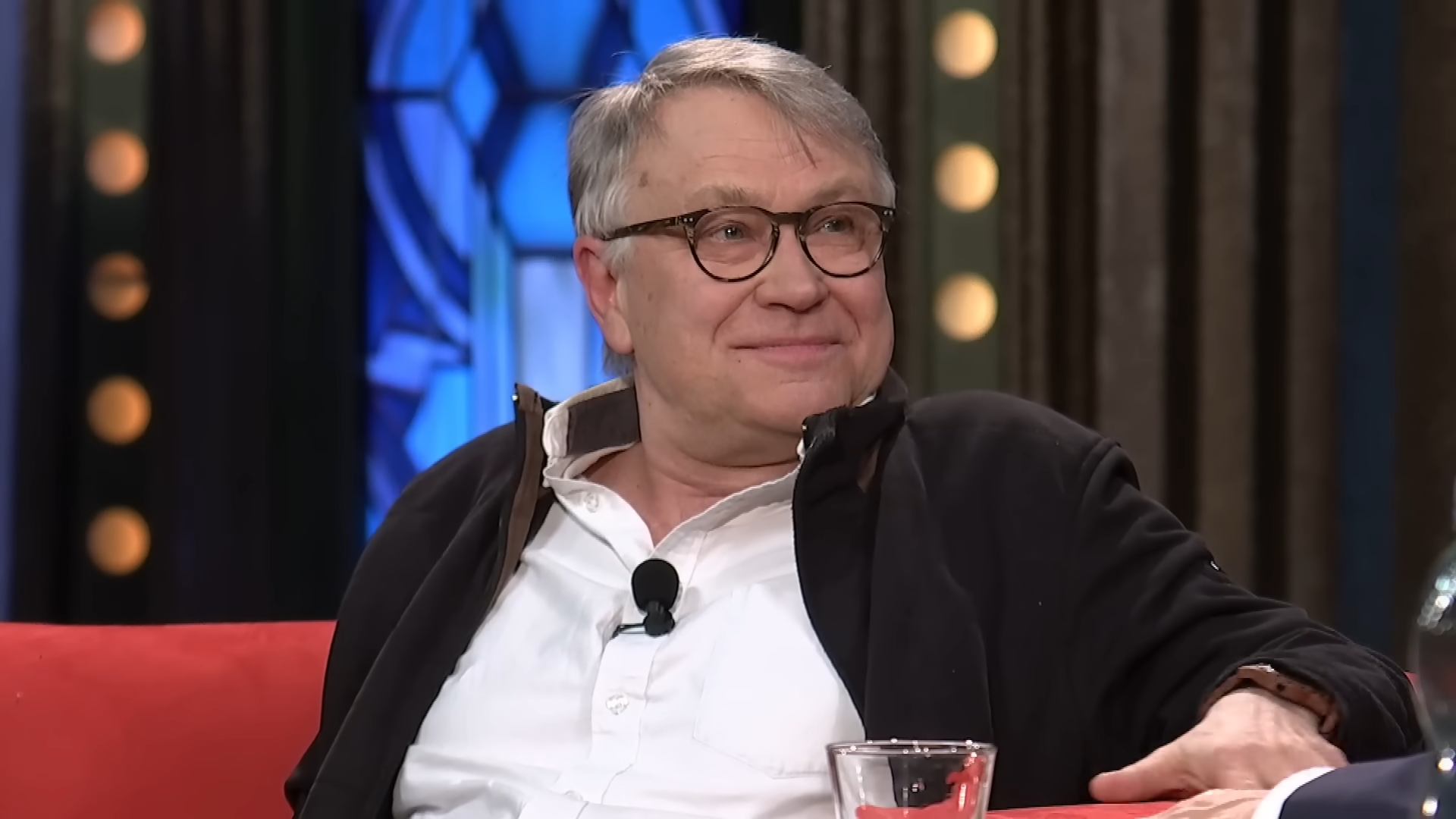

Antonín Procházka is a Czech film, television and stage actor, playwright and director.

== Biography ==
Procházka was born 25 December 1953 in Kroměříž, Czechoslovakia. He studied at the Faculty of Theatre of the Academy of Performing Arts in Prague. He is husband of actress Štěpánka Křesťanová and father of actor Antonín Procházka jr. Procházka has written 13 stage plays, largely comedies.

== Theatre ==
=== J. K. Tyl Theatre, Plzeň ===
- Kouzlo 4D (2013-???) ....
- The Dresser (22 June 2013-????) .... Norman
- Celebrity, s.r.o. ....
- Ve státním zájmu .... ???
- Přes přísný zákaz dotýká se sněhu (2005–2012) .... Emil
- Věrní abonenti .... ???
- With your not daughter (1996) .... ???
- Queen Margot .... Charles IX.
- I Served the King of England .... Jan Dítě
- King Lear .... Clown
- Chekhov in Jalta .... Anton Pavlovich Chekhov
- Rozmarné léto .... Roch
- Marriage .... Kočkarev
- Jakub a jeho pán .... Jakub, servant
- Pokoušení .... Fistulo
- Mandragora .... Ligurio
- Amadeus .... Wolfgang Amadeus Mozart
- Closely Watched Trains .... Hrma

== Plays ==
=== Original plays ===
- Klíče na neděli (Keys on Sunday)
- Fatální bratři (Fatal Brothers)
- S tvojí dcerou ne (With your not Daughter)
- Vraždy a něžnosti (Murders and Tenderness)
- Věrní abonenti (Staunch Constituency)
- Holka nebo kluk (A Girl or a Boy)
- Ještě jednou, profesore (At Once, Professor)
- Kristián II. (Christian II.)
- Přes přísný zákaz dotýká se sněhu (He Touched a Snow Through Strict Ban)
- Láska je láska (Love Is Love)
- Celebrity s.r.o. (Celebrity, Inc.)
- Ve státním zájmu (In the National Interest)
