= Zora =

Zora may refer to:

- Zora (given name), a name of Arabic, Slavic, African origin
- Zora language, a Kainji language of Nigeria
- Zora (spider), a genus of spiders in the family Zoridae
- Zora (TV series), a Kenyan soap opera-drama series
- Zora (album), a 2024 album by Sheppard
- Zora (The Legend of Zelda), a fictional race in The Legend of Zelda series
- Zora (vampire), an Italian comic book erotic character from the 1970s
- Zora (magazine), a literature journal published by Bosnian Serb intelligentsia
- Zora, Missouri, United States
- Zora, Pennsylvania, the site of a Civil War skirmish near Monterey Pass
- ZORA, a website for women of color published by Medium
- FK Zora, a Montenegrin football club
