= Jan Karafiát (author) =

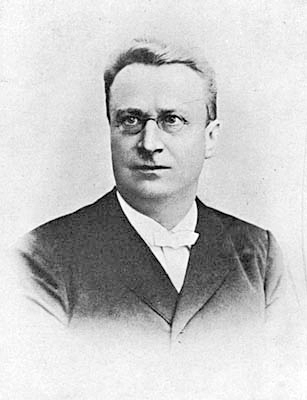
- Jan Karafiát
- Born: 4 January 1846; Jimramov, Austrian Empire
- Died: 31 January 1929 (aged 83); Prague, Czechoslovakia
- Occupation(s): Theologian, author

Jan Karafiát (4 January 1846 – 31 January 1929) was a Czech clergyman of the Evangelical Church of Czech Brethren and author. He is best known for his classic children's book Broučci, the Czech language word for Fireflies, that was first published in the early 1870s. Traditional Czech figurines of fairylike insect people are based on the characters in the book. He is also known for his poetry, which often reflected his religious beliefs, additionally he was one of the reviewers of Bible of Kralice – the first Czech protestant translation of the Bible.

== Life ==
Karafiát was born to a wealthy family in Jimramov in 1846. He went to school at Gütersloh. He studied theology in Litomyšl, Berlin (1866–1867), Bonn (1867–1868), Vienna (1866–1869) and Edinburgh (1871–1872). He became Vicar at Roudnice nad Labem and in 1874 an administrator of the Protestant theological seminar in Čáslav. From 1875 until his conflict with the consistory in Vienna in 1895, he led the parish of Velká Lhota (that time called Hrubá Lhota). From that point until his death in 1929, he lived in Prague.

Jan Karafiát was buried in Vinohrady Cemetery.
