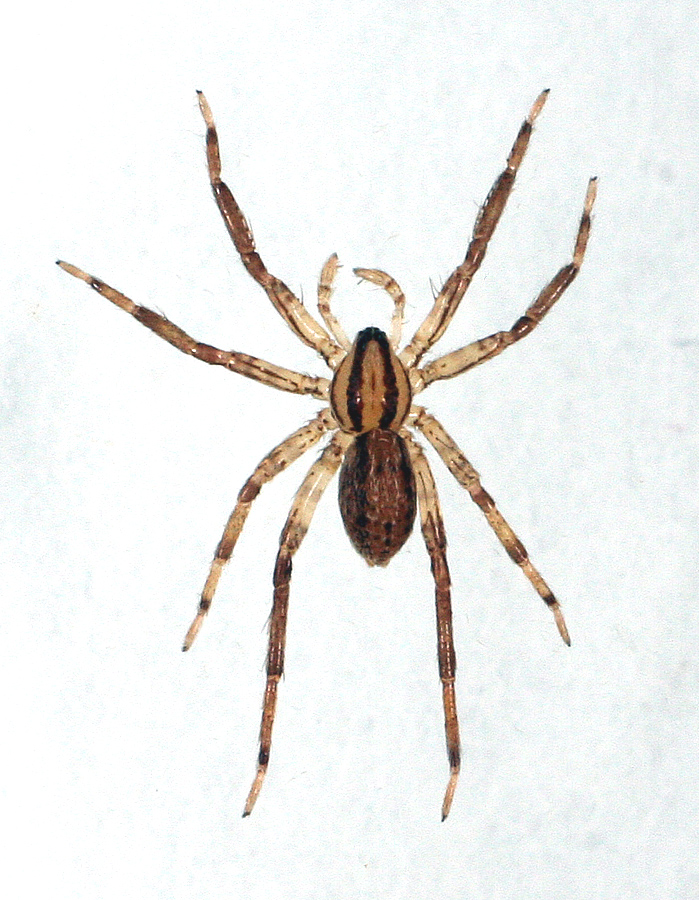

Scientific classification
- Kingdom: Animalia
- Phylum: Arthropoda
- Subphylum: Chelicerata
- Class: Arachnida
- Order: Araneae
- Infraorder: Araneomorphae
- Family: Miturgidae
- Genus: Zora
- Species: Z. spinimana

Binomial name
- Zora spinimana (Sundevall, 1833)

Synonyms
- Hecaerge maculata Blackwall, 1833; Lycaena spinimana Sundevall, 1833; Dolomedes spinimanus (Sundevall, 1833); Dolomedes lycaena Walckenaer, 1837; Psilothra spinimana (Sundevall, 1833); Hecaerge spinimana (Sundevall, 1833); Zora lycaena Thorell, 1870; Zora maculata (Blackwall, 1833)

= Zora spinimana =

Species of spider

Zora spinimana is a prowling spider of the family Miturgidae with a Palearctic distribution. It is the type species of the genus Zora.

== Description ==
The females are 5-7.7 mm in length, the males 4.5–5 mm. The epigyne has a small groove and a larger spermatheca. The species is very similar to Zora silvestris but the brown lateral bands on the carapace are narrower than the yellow bands, whereas in Z. silvestris the brown lateral bands are wider than the yellowish bands. Z. spinimana is slightly larger than Z. silvestris and the overall yellow colour of Z. spinimana has a warmer hue. Z. spinimana has three pairs of ventral spines on metatarsus I and II, but Z. silvestris has only two.

== Biology ==
The female is often found sitting on a white sheet of silk which she spins to protect her egg sac. Adults, of both sexes, may be recorded throughout the year, but mostly from late spring into the autumn, with two apparent peaks in early to mid-summer and the autumn.

== Habitat ==
The species is often found in grassland, normally near the ground in grass roots and leaf litter but also under stones or other objects. It can also be found in other habitats such as heathland, open woodland and raised bogs.

== Distribution ==
Zora spinimana has a Palearctic distribution. In Europe this is a common species in western and central Europe but in Great Britain it is commoner in the south and in eastern Scotland but it becomes more localised in northern England and western Scotland.
