= Zorka Velimirović =

Serbian translator

Zorka "Zora" Velimirović (Serbian Cyrillic: Зорка Велимировић; 1878 - 1941) is recognised as the first Serbian woman translator, who worked on translating the works of Russian-language writers to Serbian. She was also the first to translate a play from Russian to Serbian.

== Early life ==
Zorka Velimirović was born in 1878 in Čitluk, Serbia during the period that particular part of Serbia was still under Ottoman rule. Her father, a Serbian Orthodox priest in the parish of Pirot, was one of the co-founders of the Srpska kniževna zadruga (Serbian Literary Co-operative) and wrote several books and articles in the field of ethnography. Her mother, Jelena was a housewife with eleven children (one of them died early), including Zorka, who was the second eldest. The children all grew up in the town and attended the Pirot Gymnasium before pursuing her education at a Teachers College. She worked in Pirot briefly as a school matron. Her sister was the sculptor, Vukosava Velimirović.

== Career ==
Velimirović began her first translation whilst at school, working on Tolstoy's Anna Karenina. She went on to study Russian literature which enabled her to work on her extensive body of translations of writers such as Gorky, Dostojevsky, Turgenev, Chekov, amongst others. She is recognised as the first Serbian woman to work as a translator. Her translation of Uncle Vanya is the earliest recorded translation of play from Russian to Serbian. According the Zoran Božović, her translations are praised for their "great accuracy".

== See also ==
- List of Serbian writers
