= Andrea Černá =

Czech actress

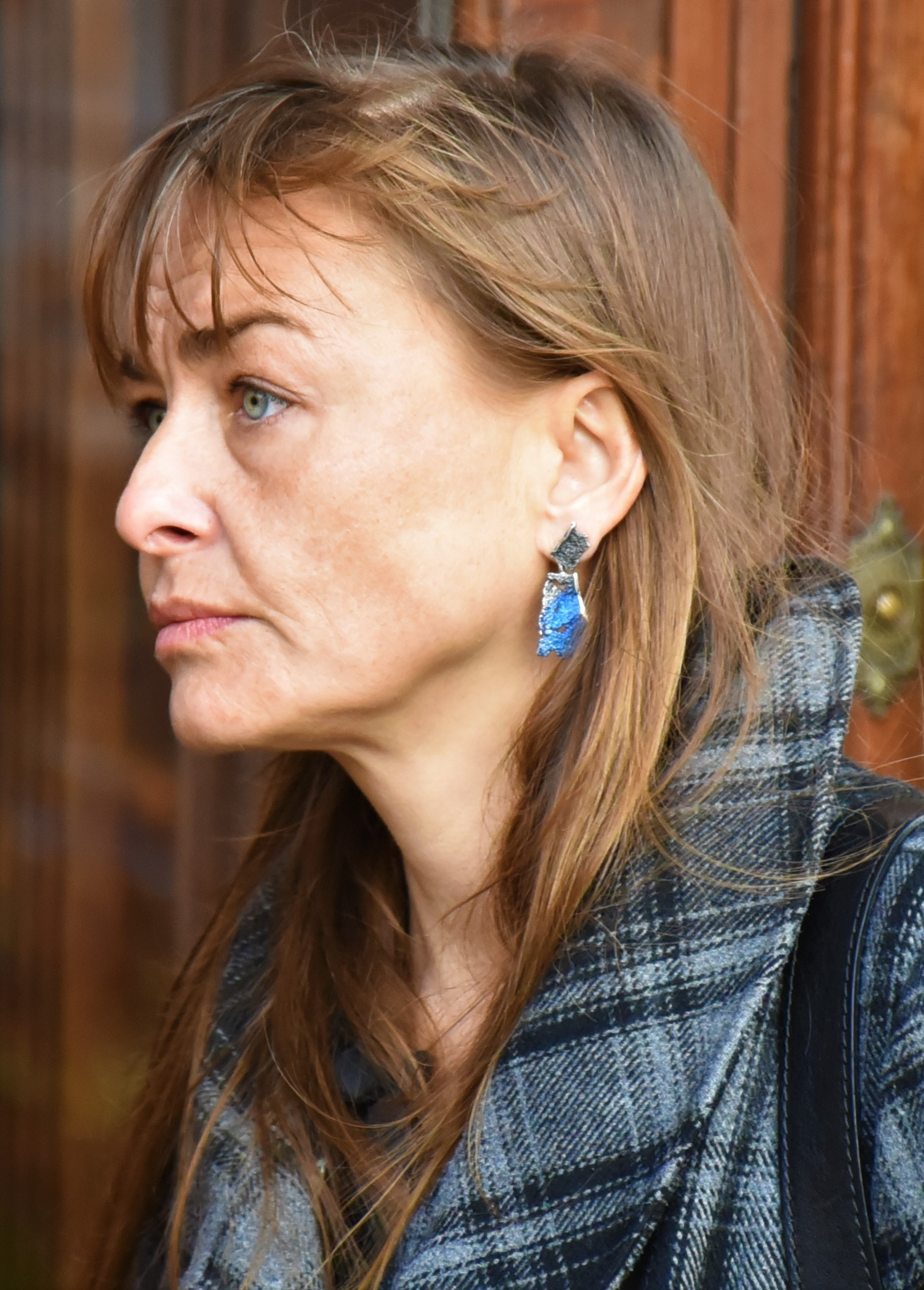
- Andrea Černá (2019)
- Born: 13 February 1977 (age 48); Karlovy Vary, Czechoslovakia
- Occupation: Actress
- Years active: 1994–present

Andrea Černá is a Czech theatrical and television actress, born 13 February 1977 in Karlovy Vary. She studied at the Prague Conservatory.

== Filmography ==
- Pátá žena (2008)
- 10 způsobů (2007)
- Slečna Guru (2006)
- Kameňák 2 (2003)
- "Strážce duší" (2005) TV seriál (episode)
- Věrní abonenti (2001) ... Petra
- Prima sezóna (1994) TV seriál (episode ??? 1995)
- Princezna ze mlejna 2 ... Eliška
- Čerte, tady straší (1998)
- Pohádka z větrného mlýna (1996)
- Princezna ze mlejna (1994) ... Eliška

== Theatre ==
=== Divadlo J. K. Tyla, Plzeň ===
- Celebrity s.r.o. ... Adéla
- Moon Over Buffalo ... Rosalind
- Přes přísný zákaz dotýká se sněhu ... Ester Kožená
- Věrní abonenti ... Petra
- Ještě jednou, pane profesore ... Nataša
- David and Goliath ... Růžena
- Maska a tvář ... Sarina
- Some Girl(s) ... Taylor
- Hamlet ... Ophelia
- Nuly ... Elvira
- Queen Margo ... Markéta
- Drobečci z perníkut ... Polly
- Arthur´s Bolero ... Anna
- Gazdina roba ... Zuzka
- Rostandovo novoromantické drama ... Roxana

=== Another Stage Works ===
- Three Sisters .... Masha (Divadlo Na Fidlovačce, Prague)
- Servant of Masters .... ??? (Jindřichohradecká činohra)
