= Anton Zorich =

Russian mathematician (born 1962)

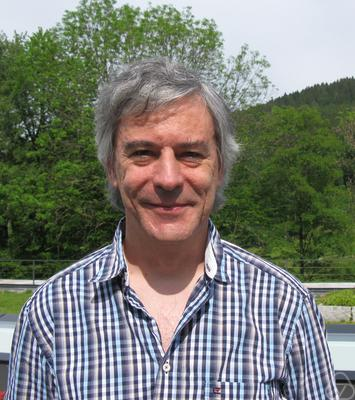
Zorich in 2011

Anton V. Zorich (in Russian: Антон Владимирович Зорич; born 3 September 1962) is a Russian mathematician at the Institut de mathématiques de Jussieu. He is the son of Vladimir A. Zorich. He received his Ph.D. from Moscow State University under the supervision of Sergei Novikov.

He was an invited speaker at the 2006 International Congress of Mathematicians in Madrid. The theme was: "Geodesics on flat surfaces".

At least two of his papers concern the explanation of mathematical discoveries he made by experimenting with computers.

== Selected publications ==
- with M. Kontsevich: "Connected components of the moduli spaces of Abelian differentials with prescribed singularities", Inventiones mathematicae (2003)
- "Flat surfaces", Frontiers in number theory, physics, and geometry (2006)
- with M. Kontsevich: "Lyapunov exponents and Hodge theory", (1997)
- "Finite Gauss measure on the space of interval exchange transformations. Lyapunov exponents", Annales de l'Institut Fourier (2003)
- with A. Eskin, and H. Masur: "Moduli spaces of Abelian differentials: the principal boundary, counting problems, and the Siegel–Veech constants", Publications Mathématiques de l'Institut des Hautes Études Scientifiques (2003)
- "Deviation for interval exchange transformations", Ergodic Theory and Dynamical Systems (1997)
- "How do the leaves of a closed 1-form wind around a surface?", Pseudoperiodic topology (1999)
