= Zorica =

Zorica (Cyrillic script: Зорица) is a feminine given name. Notable people with the name include:

- Zorica Brunclik
- Zorica Despodovska
- Zorica Dimitrijević-Stošić (1934–2013), Serbian pianist, accompanist, Full Professor of Piano at the Faculty of Music in Belgrade
- Zorica Ðurković (born 1957), former basketball player
- Zorica Jevremović (born 1948), theatre and video director, playwright, choreographer
- Zorica Kondža
- Zorica McCarthy
- Zorica Mitov
- Zorica Mršević
- Zorica Nikolin
- Zorica Pantić (born c. 1951), college administrator and professor of electrical engineering
- Zorica Pavićević (born 1956), former Yugoslav handball player
- Zorica Vojinović (born 1958), former Yugoslav/Serbian handball player
- Zorica (princess)
