= Zora Kostková =

Czech actress

- Born: 16 February 1952 (age 73); Plzeň, Czechoslovakia
- Occupation: Actress
- Years active: 1974-present

Zora Kostková (also known as Zorka Kostková; born 16 February 1952) is a Czech actress. She joined the J. K. Tyl Theatre in 1974. Kostková was awarded the Vendelín Budil Prize in 2005, later being recognised with the Bohumil Kulhánek plaque from the municipal district of Plzeň 3 in 2008. As well as acting, she has co-written a children's book, "Mlhášek", which is in Czech and French. She taught at Konzervatoř Plzeň for seven years, as well as working with the University of West Bohemia.

== Selected filmography ==
- Život na zámku (television, 1997–2000)
- Ordinace v růžové zahradě (television, 2009–2013)
