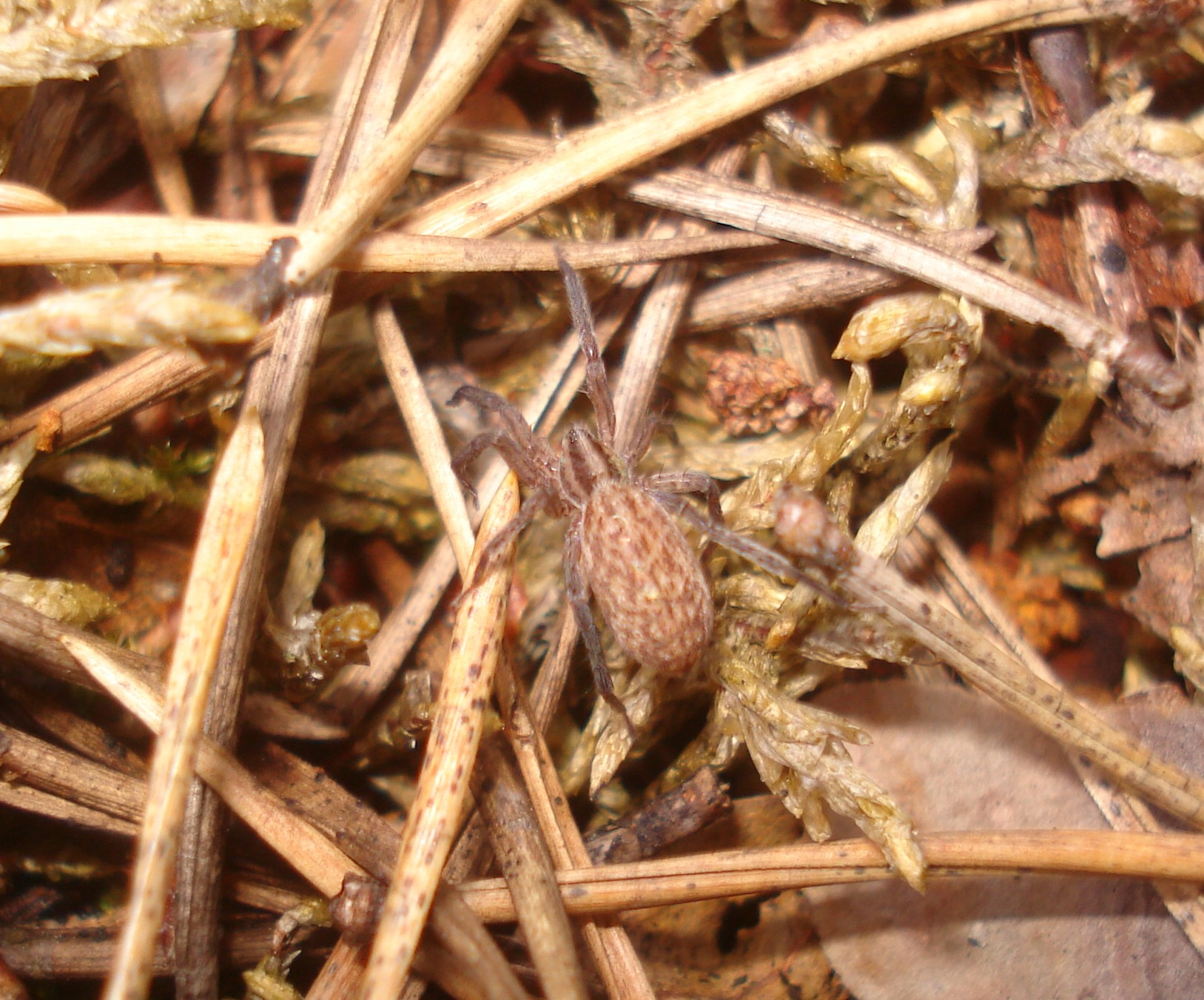
- Zora silvestris

Scientific classification
- Domain: Eukaryota
- Kingdom: Animalia
- Phylum: Arthropoda
- Subphylum: Chelicerata
- Class: Arachnida
- Order: Araneae
- Infraorder: Araneomorphae
- Family: Miturgidae
- Genus: Zora; C. L. Koch, 1847

Species
- See text

= Zora (spider) =

Genus of spiders

Zora is a genus of spiders in the family Miturgidae, consisting of small to medium entelegyne, ecribellate spiders. They can be identified as they have two claws with claw tufts, distinct longitudinal bands on the cephalothorax, 4-2-2 arrangement of the eight eyes and long overlapping spines on the first two tibiae and metatarsi. Their abdomens show distinct colour patterns which may be useful in identification to species. There are 17 species in the genus which have a Holarctic distribution, mostly in Europe and the Middle East but with two species in North America. The type species is Zora spinimana.

== Identification ==
Zora spiders have a narrow anterior carapace with a characteristic dark compact eye group with both of the rows of eyes strongly recurved. There are paired ventral spines on legs I and II. All of the species are similar in general appearance, their general colour is yellow with a wide brown band extending back from each posterior lateral eye. The prosoma has a thin Y-shaped brown marking with spots and irregular lines along its flanks.

== Species ==
The following species are listed as accepted in the World Spider Catalog as of September 2016.

- Zora acuminate Zhu & Zhang, 2006 - China
- Zora alpina Kulczyński, 1915 - Switzerland, Italy
- Zora armillata Simon, 1878 - Europe, Russia
- Zora distincta Kulczyński, 1915 - Eastern Europe
- Zora hespera Corey & Mott, 1991 - United States of America, Canada
- Zora lyriformis Song, Zhu & Gao, 1993 - China
- Zora manicata Simon, 1878 - Europe, Ukraine, Israel
- Zora nemoralis (Blackwall, 1861) - Palearctic
- Zora opiniosa (O. Pickard-Cambridge, 1872) - Lebanon
- Zora palmgreni Holm, 1945 - Sweden
- Zora parallela Simon, 1878 - Europe, Russia
- Zora pardalis Simon, 1878 - Europe to Kazakhstan
- Zora prespaensis Drensky, 1929 - Macedonia
- Zora pumila (Hentz, 1850) - United States of America
- Zora silvestris Kulczyński, 1897 - Europe to Central Asia
- Zora spinimana (Sundevall, 1833) - Palearctic
