= Zoričić =

Zoricic or Zoričić is a Croatian patronymic surname. Notable people with the surname include:

- Ivan Zoričić (1937–2018), Croatian linguist
- Milovan Zoričić (1884–1971), Croatian football official and criminal judge
- Milovan Zoričić (statistician) (1850–1912), Croatian statistician
- Nick Zoricic (1983–2012), Canadian ski cross skier

== See also ==
- Zorić
