= Zoran =

- Gender: Male

Origin
- Origin: Slavic
- Meaning: daybreak
- Region of origin: countries that speak South Slavic languages

Other names
- Nickname: Zoki
- Related names: Zora

Zoran (Serbian Cyrillic: Зоран) is a common South Slavic name, the masculine form of Zora, which means 'dawn, daybreak'. The name is especially common in Serbia, North Macedonia, Croatia and to some degree in Slovenia.

Notable people with this given name include:

- Zoran Bečić, Bosnian Serb actor
- Zoran Baldovaliev, Macedonian football player
- Zoran Ćirjaković, Serbian journalist
- Zoran Cvijanović, Serbian actor
- Zoran Ćirić, Serbian writer
- Zoran Đerić, Bosnian Serb politician
- Zoran Đinđić, Serbian politician
- Zoran Dukić, Croatian classical guitarist
- Zoran Džorlev, Macedonian violinist
- Zoran Erić, Serbian composer
- Zoran Erceg, Serbian basketball player
- Zoran Filipović, Montenegrin football coach
- Zoran G. Jančić, Bosnian Croat pianist
- Zoran Janjetov, Serbian comic artist
- Zoran Janković (politician) (born 1953), Slovenian businessman and politician
- Zoran Janković (footballer) (born 1974), Serbian-born Bulgarian football manager and former player
- Zoran Janković (water polo) (1940–2002), Yugoslavian water polo player
- Zoran "Bajo" Janković, Macedonian musician best known as the bassist for Aleksandar Makedonski
- Zoran Jovanovski, Macedonian football player
- Zoran Jolevski, Macedonian Ambassador to the US
- Zoran Knežević (astronomer), Serbian astronomer
- Zoran Knežević (politician), Serbian politician
- Zoran Krušvar, Croatian writer
- Zoran Ladicorbic, Yugoslavian-born American fashion designer, professionally known as Zoran.
- Zoran Lazarević (basketball player) (born 1947), Serbian basketball player
- Zoran Lazarević (general) (born 1967), Montenegrin general
- Zoran Lazarević (Uncharted), a character in the video game Uncharted 2: Among Thieves
- Zoran Lilić, Serbian politician
- Zoran Lončar, Serbian politician
- Zoran Mamić, Croatian football player
- Zoran Mićović, Serbian politician
- Zoran Milanović, Croatian politician
- Zoran Milinković (politician), Serbian politician
- Zoran Mirković, Serbian football player
- Zoran Mušič, Slovenian painter
- Zoran Pavlovič, Slovenian football player
- Zoran Planinić, Croatian basketball player
- Zoran Pešić (rugby league), Serbian rugby player
- Zoran Popovich (1931–2018), Pennsylvania mayor and judge
- Zoran Predin, Slovenian musician
- Zoran Radmilović, Serbian actor
- Zoran Radović, Serbian basketball player
- Zoran Rankić, Serbian actor
- Zoran Rant, Slovenian scientist
- Zoran Redžić, Bosnian musician
- Zoran Savić, Serbian basketball player
- Zoran Simjanović, Serbian musician
- Zoran Simović, Montenegrin football player
- Zoran Stanković, Serbian politician
- Zoran Stojković, Serbian politician
- Zorán Sztevanovity (Zoran Stefanović), Serbian-Hungarian musician
- Zoran Šami, Serbian Politician
- Zoran Terzić, Serbian volleyball player and coach
- Zoran Tošić, Serbian footballer
- Zoran Urumov, Serbian footballer
- Zoran Vanev, Macedonian musician
- Zoran Vujović, Croatian football player
- Zoran Vuković, Bosnian Serb war crime suspect
- Zoran Vuletić (politician) (born 1970), Serbian politician
- Zoran Vuletić (musician) (born 1960), Croatian keyboardist, of the band Haustor
- Zoran Vulić, Croatian football player
- Zoran Zaev, Macedonian politician
- Zoran Žigić, Bosnian Serb war crime suspect
- Zoran Živković (handballer) (born 1945), Serbian handball player and coach widely known under his nickname Tuta
- Zoran Živković (writer) (born 1948), Serbian writer
- Zoran Živković (politician) (born 1960), politician and former Prime Minister of Serbia
- Zoran Živković (footballer) (born 1967), Croatian international footballer

== See also ==
- Zohran Mamdani (born 1991), Ugandan-American politician
- Slavic names
