= Zorka Ságlová =

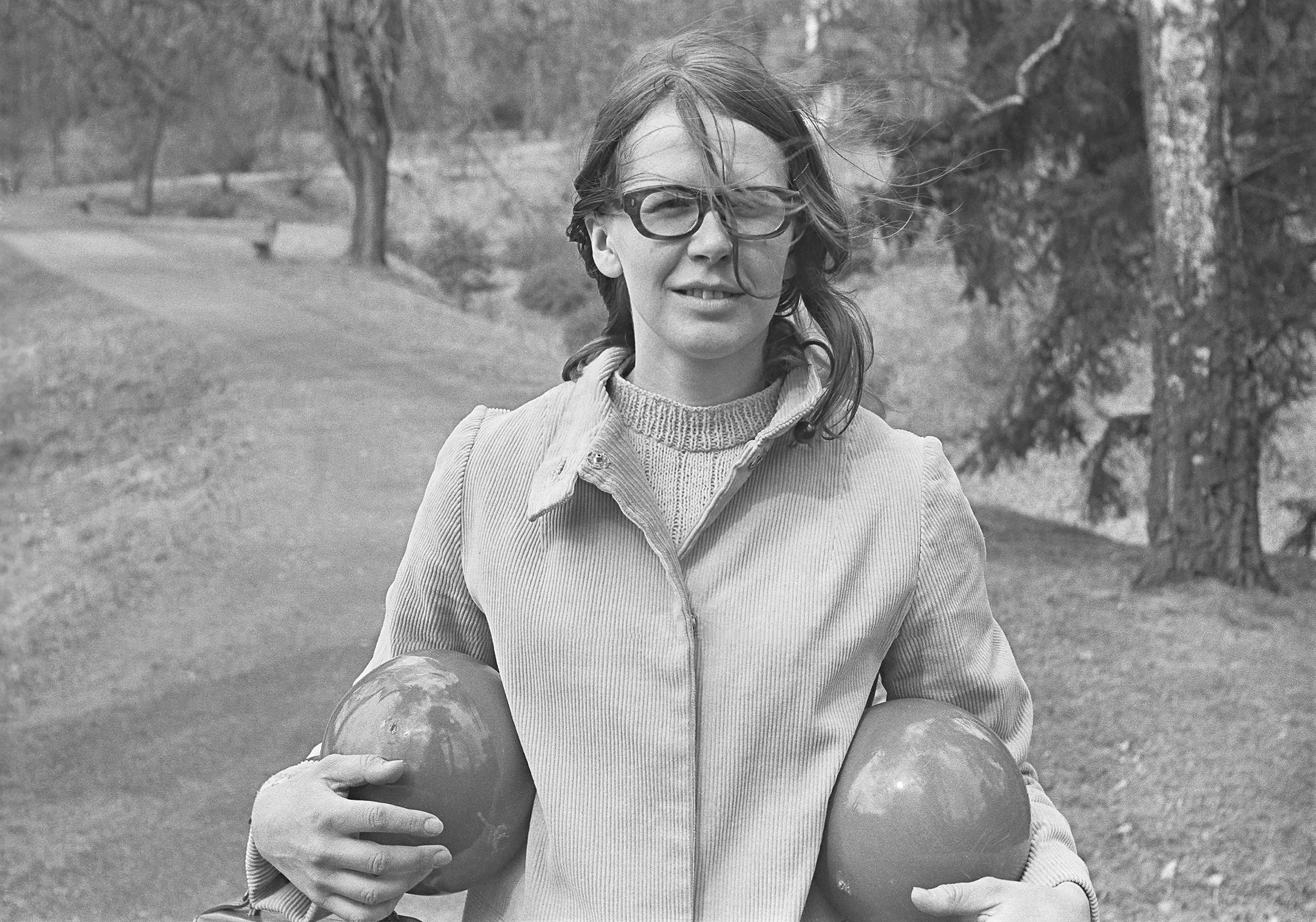
- Zorka Ságlová during the action "Throwing Balls into Bořín Pond in Průhonice," April 1969. Photo by Jan Ságl.
- Born: 1942; Humpolec
- Died: 2003 (aged 60–61); Prague
- Education: Academy of Arts, Architecture and Design, Prague
- Known for: performance art

Zorka Ságlová (1943–2003) was a Czech textile artist, painter, and performance artist.

== Biography ==
Ságlová was born in 1942 in the town of Humpolec. Her mother was a teacher and seamstress and her father was a financial clerk. Her brother, Ivan Martin "Magor" Jirous (1944–2011) went on to become a poet and artistic director of the dissident psychedelic rock band Plastic People of the Universe. Her cousin, the prominent Czech modern art historian Jifií Padrta, influenced her artistic interests from an early age.

After secondary school, Ságlová took an apprenticeship as a weaver. From 1961 to 1966 she studied textile design at the Academy of Arts, Architecture and Design, Prague. In 1964 she married the photographer Jan Ságl. Their daughter Alenka was born in 1968. After graduating, she took up geometric painting and performance art. Her performances of the late 1960s and early 1970s combined happening and land art, and often occurred in open air settings. After the Prague Spring, she carried out more collective actions, often in rural areas. After "Hay-Straw" in 1969, she was persecuted by the media and sidelined by official art circles during the period of Normalization. After 1972, she retired from public life and returned to tapestry and painting, influenced by political pressure due to the persecution of her frequent collaborators in Plastic People of the Universe. She did not revisit performance until the late 1980s with small, more private happenings. Ságlová continued to work throughout the 1990s, and died in 2003.

== Work ==
Ságlová's first happening "Throwing Balls" occurred in April 1969, in which participants threw 37 blue, green, and orange plastic balls into Bořín Pond in Průhonice outside of Prague. The floating balls made different configurations on the surface of the water, producing "a floating sculpture taken by wind and waves."

The installation "Hay-Straw" took place in August 1969, in Václav Špala Gallery in Prague. She placed bales of hay in the gallery, and they constantly changed shape as they became rearranged and scattered throughout the rooms. On one hand, the avant-garde nature of the installation shocked the art establishment, but on the other, it was a poetic and traditional work.

For "Laying out Nappies near Sudoměř" in May 1970, she and her friends laid out 700 white cloths across a field, reportedly the site of the historical battlefield of the Battle of Sudoměř in 1420. According to legend, the local Hussite women spread cloths over the battlefield to impair the invading Catholic army, whose horses' legs would become tangled in the cloths. During the oppressive period of Normalization, she created a metaphor for the historical Bohemian independence movement, which would have been easily interpreted by her contemporaries.

In "Homage to Fafejta" in October 1972 participants inflated hundreds of condoms like balloons and released them out of the windows of an abandoned castle. The happening's name comes from the name of a well-known condom manufacturer in prewar Czechoslovakia, who used crude slogans in advertisements. The band Plastic People of the Universe participated in many of Ságlová's happenings, including "Throwing Balls" and "Homage to Farfejta," during which they provided a musical accompaniment.

Around 1980, she introduced the motif of a rabbit into her work as a modular element, referencing both the iconography of medieval tapestry and omnipresent pop culture. In many of her works, she repeated the rabbit's silhouette hundreds or thousands of times, a cipher through which to read the painting as a whole.

== Exhibitions ==
Zorka Ságlová has been the subject of major retrospective exhibitions in the Czech Republic, including at the National Gallery Prague and the Moravian Gallery in Brno in 2006, and the Benedikt Rejt Gallery in Louny in 2007, and the Gallery of Modern Art in Hradec Králové in 2017. Her works have been exhibited internationally, for example in the 1998 exhibition Out of Actions (MOCA Los Angeles, MAK Vienna, MAC Barcelona, and Museum of Contemporary Art Tokyo), the 2012 exhibition Ends of the Earth: Land Art to 1974 (Haus der Kunst Munich, MOCA Los Angeles) and Art in Europe 1945 – 1968 (2016, ZKM Karlsruhe). In 2019–2020, the Wende Museum exhibited her work in the Medea Insurrection: Radical Women Artists Behind the Iron Curtain.
