= Josef Kajetán Tyl Theatre =

- Divadlo Josefa Kajetána Tyla
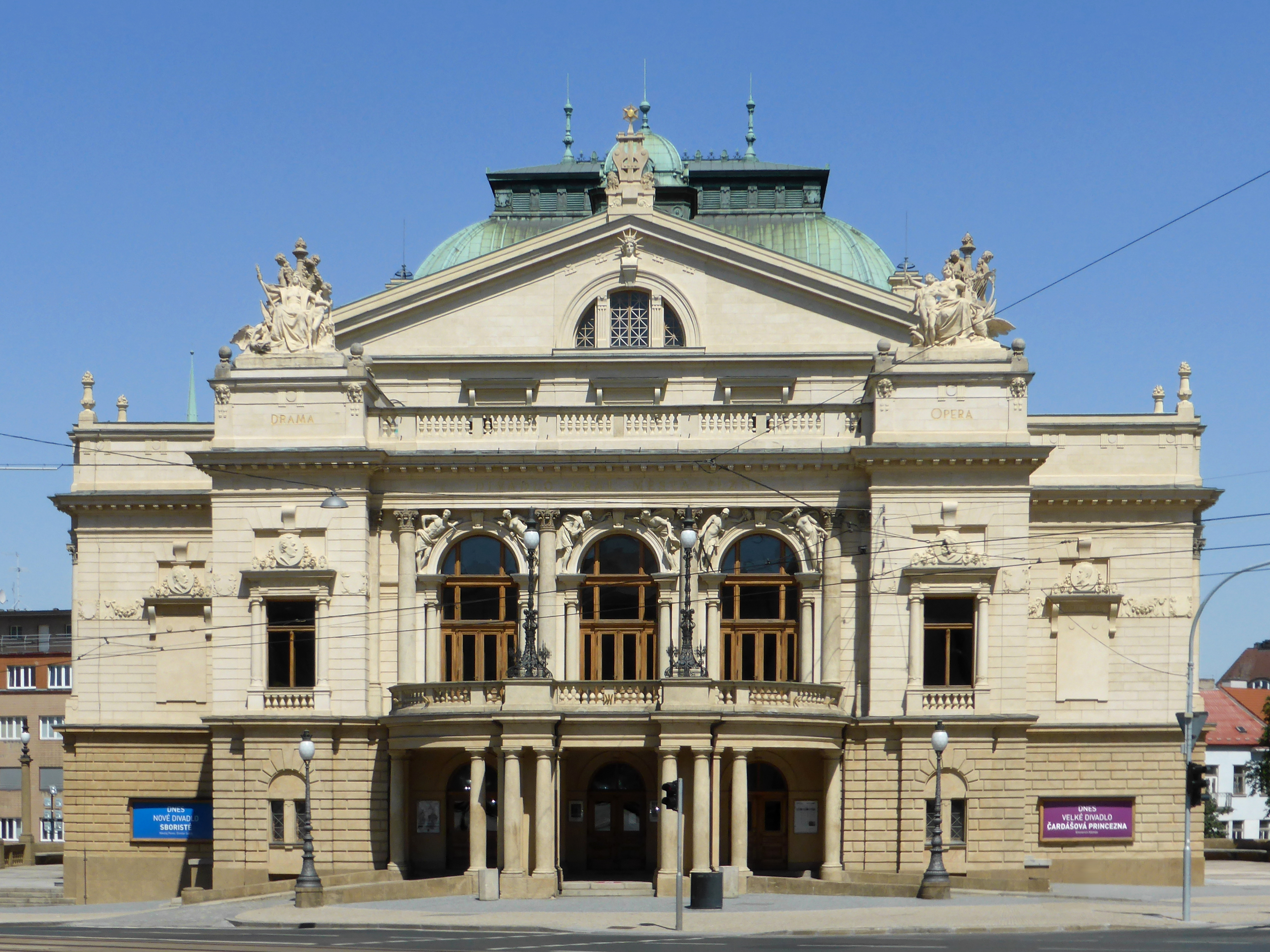
- Interactive map of Josef Kajetán Tyl Theatre
- Location: Plzeň, Czech Republic
- Coordinates: 49°44′43.5″N 13°22′24.1″E
- Capacity: 444

Construction
- Opened: 1902
- Rebuilt: 1981–1985
- Architect: Antonín Balšánek

Website
- www.djkt.eu

Josef Kajetán Tyl Theatre (Czech: Divadlo Josefa Kajetána Tyla) is a main theatre in Plzeň, Czech Republic. The theatre was built between 1899 and 1902 in the Neo-Renaissance style with some Art Nouveau elements to the design of Antonin Balsanek. Every year the theatre performs some 18 premieres of drama, operas, operettas, ballets or musicals. Since September 2014, actors of the theatre also perform at the New Theatre.

From 1950 til 1983 Věra Caltová worked as a theatre photographer at the venue.

In front of the façade stands a statue of Josef Kajetán Tyl by Alois Soper.

== Recent and present productions ==
- Adriana Lecouvreur by Francesco Cilea (O)
- Akvabely by David Drábek (D)
- 'Art' by Yasmina Reza (D)
- The Barber of Seville by Gioachino Rossini (O)
- The Bartered Bride by Bedřich Smetana (O)
- Bohema by Giacomo Puccini (O)
- Čachtická paní by Petr Malásek (B)
- Carmen by Georges Bizet (O)
- Celebrity s.r.o. by Antonín Procházka (D)
- Chicago by John Kander and Fred Ebb (M)
- Coppélia by Léo Delibes (B)
- Cyrano de Bergerac by Edmond Rostand (D)
- Dáma na kolejích by J. Bažant, J. Malásek, V. Hála (M)
- The Duchess of Chicago by Emmerich Kálmán, Julius Brammer and Alfred Grünwald (operetta)
- Edith – Piaf from the suburb by Petr Malásek (B)
- Faust by Charles Gounod (B)
- Huis clos by Jean-Paul Sartre (D)
- Jenůfa by Leoš Janáček (O)
- The Jungle Book by Radek Balas and Ondrej Brousek (M)
- Kolochava by Petr Ulrych and Stanislav Mosa (M)
- La dama del alba by Alejandro Casona (D)
- Lantern (Lucerna) by Alois Jirásek (D)
- Leaving (Odcházení) by Václav Havel (D)
- Lemonade Joe by Jiři Brdečka (M)
- Like Totally Weird by William Mastrosimone (D)
- The Merry Wives of Windsor by Otto Nicolai, based on the play by William Shakespeare (O)
- Maryša by Alois Mrštík and Vilém Mrštík (O)
- Maryša by P.Wajsar (B)
- Monty Python's Spamalot by John Du Prez and Eric Idle (M)
- Nabucco by Giuseppe Verdi (O)
- The Nutcracker by Pyotr Ilyich Tchaikovsky (B)
- Our Swaggerers by Ladislav Stroupežnický (D)
- Portugal by Zoltan Egressy (D)
- Promises, Promises by Neil Simon (M)
- Romeo and Juliet by William Shakespeare (D)
- Rumors by Neil Simon (D)
- Rusalka by Antonín Dvořák (O)
- Salome by Richard Strauss (O)
- Singin' in the Rain by Betty Comden, Adolph Green, Arthur Freed and Nacio Herb Brown (M)
- The Sleeping Beauty by Pyotr Ilyich Tchaikovsky (B)
- Swan Lake by Pyotr Ilyich Tchaikovsky (B)
- The Taming of the Shrew by William Shakespeare (D)
- The Taming of the Shrew by William Shakespeare (D)
- Thoroughly Modern Millie by Jeanine Tesori (M)
- The Two Widows by Bedřich Smetana (O)
- Uličnice by Jára Beneš (M)
- Uncle Vanya by Anton Chekhov (D)
- Válka ve sborovně aneb Habada a Jordán by Václav Štech (D)
- Ve statnim zajmu by Antonín Procházka (D)
- Zorba by Joseph Stein, Fred Ebb and John Kander (M)
