= Zdeněk Rohlíček =

Czech actor

Zdeněk Rohlíček (born 20 July 1980 in Prague) is a Czech actor known especially for his stage work.

== Early life ==
Rohlíček gained his first dramatic experience as a child by performing puppet shows, appearing in made-for-television fairy tales, and choral singing while in music school. He graduated from Prague Conservatory in 2002.

== Theatre ==
After graduating from the conservatory, Zdeněk Rohlíček worked as an actor for a short time in The Metro Theater in Prague, and in The Black Theater of Frantisek Kratochvil. Since 2004 he has been performing at the J. K. Tyl Theatre in Plzeň. He has also appeared as a guest actor in The Alfa Theater, and he has taken part in several annual summer theatrical festivals in Plzeň and in Nebílovy.

== Film and television ==
Rohlíček appeared in several television productions and fairy tales directed by Vlasta Janeckova and Moris Issa during his childhood. Later he also played alongside Vlasta Chramostova in Pavel Kohout's adaptation of PF 77, playing Peter, a student who signed Charter 77.

- prince - O moudre Sorfarine (1995)
- Peter - PF 77 (2003)
- Sigmund Freud (20) - The Question of God: S. Freud & C.S.Lewis (2004)
- son - To nevymyslis (ep. Babicka inkognito) (2005)
- Milos - Celebrity s.r.o (Theater) (2007)
- Howard - Moon over Buffalo (Theater) (2007)

== See also ==
- J. K. Tyl Theatre
