= Vladimir A. Zorich =

Russian mathematician (1937–2023)

- Владимир А. Зорич
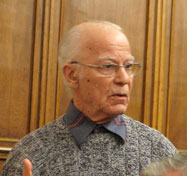
- Zorich in 2011
- Born: Vladimir Antonovich Zorich (Владимир Антонович Зорич); 16 December 1937; Moscow, Russian SFSR, USSR
- Died: 14 August 2023 (aged 85); Moscow, Russia
- Education: Moscow State University
- Occupation: Professor at Moscow State University
- Notable work: Mathematical Analysis (1980)
- Children: 2
- Awards: Lenin Komsomol Prize

Vladimir Antonovich Zorich (Russian: Владимир Антонович Зорич; 16 December 1937 – 14 August 2023) was a Soviet and Russian mathematician. He was the author of the textbook "Mathematical Analysis" for students of mathematical and physical specialties of higher education, which was reprinted several times and translated into many languages.

== Scientific career ==
Zorich was an expert in various fields of mathematical analysis, conformal geometry, and the theory of quasi-conformal mappings. He graduated from the Faculty of Mechanics and Mathematics at the Moscow State University in 1960. In 1963 he graduated from the faculty's graduate school (Department of Theory of Functions and Functional Analysis) and defended his thesis "Compliance boundaries for some classes of mappings in space", which was noted as outstanding. In 1969 he defended his doctoral thesis "Global reversibility of quasi-conformal mappings of space". Zorich taught at the Department of Mathematical Analysis of Mechanics and Mathematics as an assistant beginning in 1963, as an assistant professor from 1969, and from 1971 as a professor. He was an honorary professor at Moscow State University (2007).

== Personal life ==
He was the father of Anton Zorich, also a Russian mathematician.

== Death ==
Vladimir A. Zorich died on 14 August 2023, at the age of 85.
