= List of Miturgidae species =

This page lists all described species of the spider family Miturgidae accepted by the World Spider Catalog as of February 2021:

== A ==
=== Argoctenus ===
Argoctenus L. Koch, 1878

- A. aureus (Hogg, 1911) — New Zealand
- A. australianus (Karsch, 1878) — Australia (New South Wales)
- A. bidentatus (Main, 1954) — Australia (Western Australia)
- A. devisi Rainbow, 1898 — New Guinea
- A. hystriculus Simon, 1909 — Australia (Western Australia)
- A. igneus L. Koch, 1878 (type) — Australia (Western Australia)
- A. nebulosus Simon, 1909 — Australia (Western Australia)
- A. pectinatus Hogg, 1900 — Australia (Victoria)
- A. pictus L. Koch, 1878 — Australia
- A. vittatus (Rainbow, 1920) — Australia (Lord Howe Is.)
- A. vittatus (Simon, 1889) — Australia, New Caledonia

== D ==
=== Diaprograpta ===
Diaprograpta Simon, 1909

- D. abrahamsae Raven, 2009 — Australia (Queensland)
- D. alfredgodfreyi Raven, 2009 — Australia (Victoria)
- D. hirsti Raven, 2009 — Australia (South Australia)
- D. peterandrewsi Raven, 2009 — Australia (Queensland)
- D. striola Simon, 1909 (type) — Australia (Western Australia)

== E ==
=== Elassoctenus ===
Elassoctenus Simon, 1909

- E. harpax Simon, 1909 (type) — Australia (Western Australia)

=== Eupograpta ===
Eupograpta Raven, 2009

- E. anhat Raven, 2009 — Australia (Queensland)
- E. kottae Raven, 2009 (type) — Australia (Western Australia)

== H ==
=== Hestimodema ===
Hestimodema Simon, 1909

- H. ambigua Simon, 1909 (type) — Australia (Western Australia)
- H. latevittata Simon, 1909 — Australia (Western Australia)

== I ==
=== Israzorides ===
Israzorides Levy, 2003

- I. judaeus Levy, 2003 (type) — Israel

== M ==
=== Mituliodon ===
Mituliodon Raven & Stumkat, 2003

- M. tarantulinus (L. Koch, 1873) (type) — Timor, Australia

=== Miturga ===
Miturga Thorell, 1870

- M. agelenina Simon, 1909 — Australia (Western Australia, Victoria, Tasmania)
- M. albopunctata Hickman, 1930 — Australia (Tasmania)
- M. annulipes (Lucas, 1844) — Australia
- M. australiensis (L. Koch, 1873) — Australia (New South Wales)
- M. catograpta Simon, 1909 — Australia (Western Australia)
- M. fagei Kolosváry, 1934 — Australia (New South Wales)
- M. ferina Simon, 1909 — Australia (Western Australia)
- M. gilva L. Koch, 1872 — Australia
- M. impedita Simon, 1909 — Australia (Western Australia)
- M. lineata Thorell, 1870 (type) — Australia
- M. necator (Walckenaer, 1837) — Australia (Tasmania)
- M. occidentalis Simon, 1909 — Australia (Western Australia)
- M. parva Hogg, 1914 — Australia (Western Australia)
- M. severa Simon, 1909 — Australia (Victoria)
- M. thorelli Simon, 1909 — Australia (Queensland)

=== Mitzoruga ===
Mitzoruga Raven, 2009

- M. elapines Raven, 2009 (type) — Australia (Queensland)
- M. insularis Raven, 2009 — Australia (Western Australia to New South Wales)
- M. marmorea (Hogg, 1896) — Australia (Northern Territory, South Australia)

== N ==
=== Nuliodon ===
Nuliodon Raven, 2009

- N. fishburni Raven, 2009 (type) — Australia (Queensland)

== O ==
=== Odomasta ===
Odomasta Simon, 1909

- O. guttipes (Simon, 1903) (type) — Australia (Tasmania)

== P ==
=== Pacificana ===
Pacificana Hogg, 1904

- P. cockayni Hogg, 1904 (type) — New Zealand

=== Palicanus ===
Palicanus Thorell, 1897

- P. caudatus Thorell, 1897 (type) — India, Myanmar, China, Indonesia, Seychelles, Reunion

=== Parapostenus ===
Parapostenus Lessert, 1923

- P. hewitti Lessert, 1923 (type) — South Africa, Lesotho

=== Prochora ===
Prochora Simon, 1886

- P. lycosiformis (O. Pickard-Cambridge, 1872) (type) — Algeria, Italy (mainland, Sicily), Israel, Iran
- P. praticola (Bösenberg & Strand, 1906) — China, Korea, Japan

=== Pseudoceto ===
Pseudoceto Mello-Leitão, 1929

- P. pickeli Mello-Leitão, 1929 (type) — Brazil

== S ==
=== Simonus ===
Simonus Ritsema, 1881

- S. lineatus (Simon, 1880) (type) — Australia (Western Australia)

=== † Strotarchus ===
† Strotarchus Simon, 1888

- † S. heidti Wunderlich, 1988
- † S. paradoxus Petrunkevitch, 1963

=== Syrisca ===
Syrisca Simon, 1886

- S. albopilosa Mello-Leitão, 1941 — Colombia
- S. arabs Simon, 1906 — Sudan
- S. longicaudata Lessert, 1929 — Congo
- S. mamillata Caporiacco, 1941 — Ethiopia
- S. patagonica (Boeris, 1889) — Argentina
- S. pictilis Simon, 1886 (type) — Senegal
- S. russula Simon, 1886 — Ethiopia
- S. senegalensis (Walckenaer, 1841) — Senegal

=== Syspira ===
Syspira Simon, 1895

- S. agujas Brescovit, Sánchez-Ruiz & Bonaldo, 2018 — Dominican Rep.
- S. alayoni Sánchez-Ruiz, de los Santos, Brescovit & Bonaldo, 2020 — Dominican Rep.
- S. analytica Chamberlin, 1924 — USA, Mexico
- S. armasi Sánchez-Ruiz, de los Santos, Brescovit & Bonaldo, 2020 — Dominican Rep.
- S. barbacoa Sánchez-Ruiz, de los Santos, Brescovit & Bonaldo, 2020 — Dominican Rep.
- S. bryantae Sánchez-Ruiz, de los Santos, Brescovit & Bonaldo, 2020 — Dominican Rep.
- S. cimitarra Brescovit, Sánchez-Ruiz & Bonaldo, 2018 — Dominican Rep.
- S. eclectica Chamberlin, 1924 — USA, Mexico
- S. jimmyi Brescovit, Sánchez-Ruiz & Bonaldo, 2018 — Dominican Rep.
- S. longipes Simon, 1895 — Mexico
- S. medialuna Brescovit, Sánchez-Ruiz & Bonaldo, 2018 — Dominican Rep.
- S. monticola (Bryant, 1948) — Dominican Rep.
- S. pallida Banks, 1904 — USA
- S. synthetica Chamberlin, 1924 — Mexico
- S. tigrina Simon, 1895 (type) — USA, Mexico

=== Systaria ===
Systaria Simon, 1897

- S. acuminata Dankittipakul & Singtripop, 2011 — Thailand, Indonesia
- S. bifida Dankittipakul & Singtripop, 2011 — Thailand. Myanmar
- S. bifidops Jäger, 2018 — Malaysia (Peninsula)
- S. bohorokensis Deeleman-Reinhold, 2001 — Indonesia (Sumatra)
- S. bregibec Jäger, 2018 — Cambodia
- S. cervina (Simon, 1897) — Philippines
- S. decidua Dankittipakul & Singtripop, 2011 — Thailand
- S. deelemanae Dankittipakul & Singtripop, 2011 — Philippines
- S. dentata Deeleman-Reinhold, 2001 — Indonesia (Sumatra)
- S. drassiformis Simon, 1897 (type) — Indonesia (Java)
- S. elberti (Strand, 1913) — Indonesia (Lombok)
- S. gedensis Simon, 1897 — Indonesia (Java)
- S. hainanensis Zhang, Fu & Zhu, 2009 — China
- S. insolita Dankittipakul & Singtripop, 2011 — Thailand
- S. insulana (Rainbow, 1902) — Vanuatu
- S. lanna Dankittipakul & Singtripop, 2011 — Thailand
- S. lannops Jäger, 2018 — Thailand
- S. leoi (Barrion & Litsinger, 1995) — Philippines
- S. longinqua Jäger, 2018 — Laos
- S. luangprabang Jäger, 2018 — Laos
- S. mengla (Song & Zhu, 1994) — China
- S. panay Jäger, 2018 — Philippines (Panay)
- S. princesa Jäger, 2018 — Philippines (Palawan)
- S. procera Jäger, 2018 — Cambodia
- S. scapigera Dankittipakul & Singtripop, 2011 — New Guinea

== T ==
=== Tamin ===
Tamin Deeleman-Reinhold, 2001

- T. pseudodrassus Deeleman-Reinhold, 2001 (type) — Borneo, Sulawesi
- T. simoni Deeleman-Reinhold, 2001 — Borneo

=== Teminius ===
Teminius Keyserling, 1887

- T. affinis Banks, 1897 — USA, Mexico
- T. agalenoides (Badcock, 1932) — Paraguay, Argentina
- T. hirsutus (Petrunkevitch, 1925) — Mexico to Venezuela, Caribbean
- T. insularis (Lucas, 1857) (type) — USA, Greater Antilles to Argentina

=== Thasyraea ===
Thasyraea L. Koch, 1878

- T. lepida L. Koch, 1878 — Australia (New South Wales)
- T. ornata L. Koch, 1878 (type) — Australia (Queensland)

=== Tuxoctenus ===
Tuxoctenus Raven, 2008

- T. gloverae Raven, 2008 (type) — Australia (Queensland, New South Wales)
- T. linnaei Raven, 2008 — Australia (Western, South Australia)
- T. mcdonaldae Raven, 2008 — Australia (Western Australia, Queensland)

== V ==
=== Voraptus ===
Voraptus Simon, 1898

- V. aerius Simon, 1898 — Congo
- V. affinis Lessert, 1925 — South Africa
- V. exilipes (Lucas, 1858) — Gabon
- V. extensus Lessert, 1916 — East Africa
- V. orientalis Hogg, 1919 — Indonesia (Sumatra)
- V. tenellus (Simon, 1893) (type) — Seychelles

== X ==
=== Xantharia ===
Xantharia Deeleman-Reinhold, 2001

- X. floreni Deeleman-Reinhold, 2001 (type) — Borneo
- X. galea Zhang, Zhang & Fu, 2010 — China
- X. murphyi Deeleman-Reinhold, 2001 — Indonesia (Sumatra)

== Z ==
=== Zealoctenus ===
Zealoctenus Forster & Wilton, 1973

- Z. cardronaensis Forster & Wilton, 1973 (type) — New Zealand

=== Zora ===
Zora C. L. Koch, 1847

- Z. acuminata Zhu & Zhang, 2006 — China
- Z. alpina Kulczyński, 1915 — Switzerland, Italy
- Z. armillata Simon, 1878 — Europe, Caucasus, Kyrgyzstan
- Z. distincta Kulczyński, 1915 — Czechia, Slovakia, Poland, Ukraine
- Z. hespera Corey & Mott, 1991 — USA, Canada
- Z. huseynovi Zamani & Marusik, 2017 — Iran
- Z. lyriformis Song, Zhu & Gao, 1993 — China
- Z. manicata Simon, 1878 — Europe, Israel, Iran
- Z. manicatoides Wunderlich, 2023 — Portugal, Spain
- Z. nemoralis (Blackwall, 1861) — Europe, Caucasus, Russia (Europe to South Siberia, Kamchatka), Kazakhstan, Iran, Turkmenistan, Mongolia, China, Korea, Japan
- Z. opiniosa (O. Pickard-Cambridge, 1872) — Lebanon
- Z. osetica Ponomarev, 2021 — Russia (Caucasus)
- Z. palmgreni Holm, 1945 — Sweden, Finland
- Z. parallela Simon, 1878 — Europe, Russia (Europe, Far East)
- Z. pardalis Simon, 1878 — Europe, Caucasus, Kazakhstan
- Z. prespaensis Drensky, 1929 — North Macedonia
- Z. pumila (Hentz, 1850) — USA
- Z. silvestris Kulczyński, 1897 — Europe, Caucasus, Turkmenistan
- Z. spinimana (Sundevall, 1833) (type) — Europe, Turkey, Caucasus, Russia (Europe to Far East), Kazakhstan, Iran, Central Asia, China, Japan

=== Zoroides ===
Zoroides Berland, 1924

- Z. dalmasi Berland, 1924 (type) — New Caledonia
