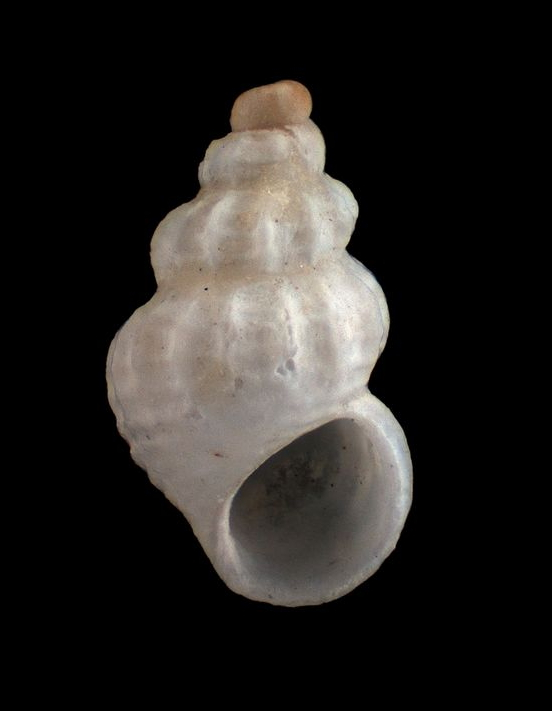
- Shell of Alvania bounteyensis (specimen at the Museum of New Zealand)

Scientific classification
- Kingdom: Animalia
- Phylum: Mollusca
- Class: Gastropoda
- Subclass: Caenogastropoda
- Order: Littorinimorpha
- Family: Rissoidae
- Genus: Alvania
- Species: A. bounteyensis

Binomial name
- Alvania bounteyensis (Dell, 1950)

Synonyms
- Alvania (Linemera) bountyensis (Dell, 1950); Alvinia (Linemera) bountyensis (Dell, 1950); Haurakia bountyensis Dell, 1950

= Alvania bounteyensis =

Species of gastropod

Alvania bounteyensis is a species of small sea snail, a marine gastropod mollusk or micromollusk in the family Rissoidae.

== Description ==
The length of the shell attains 2.15 mm (0.085 in), its diameter 1.2 mm (0.047 in).

== Distribution ==
This species is endemic to New Zealand and occurs off the Bounty Islands.
