= Diallomus =

Scientific classification
- Kingdom: Animalia
- Phylum: Arthropoda
- Subphylum: Chelicerata
- Class: Arachnida
- Order: Araneae
- Infraorder: Araneomorphae
- Family: Ctenidae
- Genus: Diallomus; Simon, 1897

Type species
- D. fuliginosus Simon, 1897

Species
- D. fuliginosus Simon, 1897 – Sri Lanka; D. speciosus Simon, 1897 – Sri Lanka

Genus of spiders

Diallomus is a genus of Asian wandering spiders first described by Eugène Simon in 1897. As of April 2019 it contains only two species, both found in Sri Lanka. Originally placed with the Zoridae (now included in Miturgidae), it was moved to Ctenidae in 2003.
