= Miturgopelma paruwi =

Scientific classification
- Kingdom: Animalia
- Phylum: Arthropoda
- Subphylum: Chelicerata
- Class: Arachnida
- Order: Araneae
- Infraorder: Araneomorphae
- Family: Miturgidae
- Genus: Miturgopelma
- Species: M. paruwi

Binomial name
- Miturgopelma paruwi Raven, 2023

Species of spider

Miturgopelma paruwi is a species of spider in the family Miturgidae.

The holotype of the species was found by a young Tasmanian on a Bush Blitz biology education program.

== Distribution ==
Miturgopelma paruwi has been recorded from Australia (New South Wales, Tasmania).
