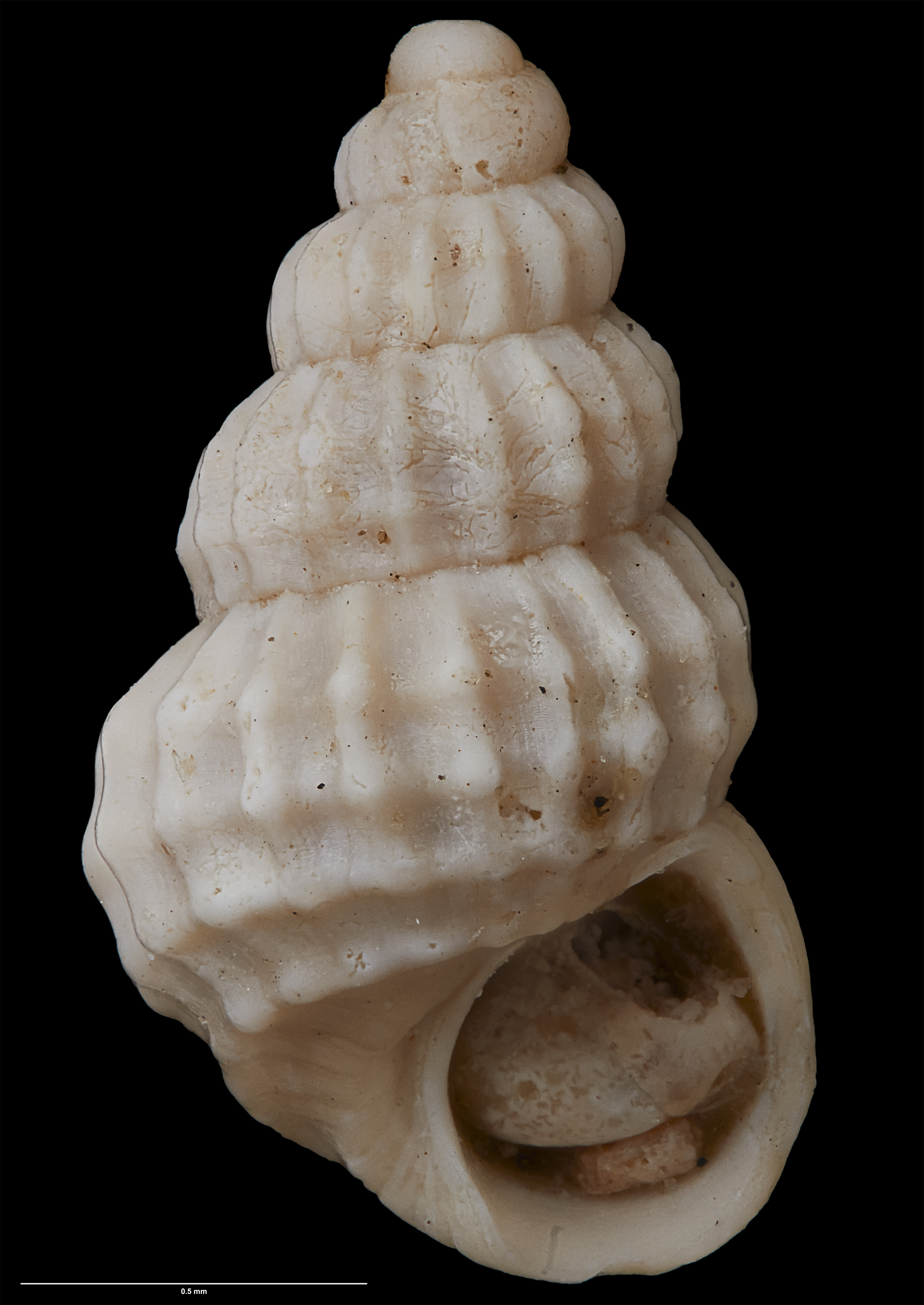
- Holotype from the Auckland War Memorial Museum

Scientific classification
- Kingdom: Animalia
- Phylum: Mollusca
- Class: Gastropoda
- Subclass: Caenogastropoda
- Order: Littorinimorpha
- Superfamily: Rissooidea
- Family: Rissoidae
- Genus: Alvania
- Species: A. maclurgi

Binomial name
- Alvania maclurgi (A. W. B. Powell, 1933)

Synonyms
- Alvania (Linemera) maclurgi (A. W. B. Powell, 1933); Alvinia (Linemera) maclurgi (A. W. B. Powell, 1933); Linemera maclurgi A. W. B. Powell, 1933

= Alvania maclurgi =

Species of gastropod

Alvania maclurgi is a species of marine gastropod mollusc in the family Rissoidae. Endemic to New Zealand, the species is found in the waters of the Chatham Islands, Bounty Islands, and on the Mernoo Bank.

== Description ==
In the original description, Powell described the species as follows:

Shell small, elongate-ovate, moderately solid, white. Whorls 5, including a prominent protoconch of two globose, smooth whorls. Post-nuclear sculpture of prominent axials, crossed by less prominent spirals. The points of intersection are raised into rounded gemmules. There are seventeen axials on the penultimate and nineteen on the body-whorl, and the interspaces are a little wider than the width of the axials. The spiral cords are few, only two on the spire whorls, with a third developing from the lower suture on the body-whorl, and two more on the base. Spire tall, about one and two-thirds height of aperture. Aperture ovate. Peristome continuous, not variced. There is a long crescentic umbilical chink, and this is bordered by the lower of the two basal spirals.

The species measures 1.8 mm (0.071 in) by 1.05 mm (0.041 in). The axials are beaded at the points where they intersect other axials. The species can be identified due to its smaller number of spiral chords.

== Taxonomy ==
The species was first described by A. W. B. Powell in 1933, who used the name Linemera maclurgi. Powell named the species after Tom MacClurg, the owner of the launch who assisted in the dredging operation that led to the discovery of the holotype. In 1985, Winston Ponder recombined Linemera as a subgenus of Alvania, leading to the species' name becoming Alvania (Linemera) maclurgi. The representation Alvania maclurgi without a subgenus is the currently accepted name.

The holotype was collected in February 1933 by either A.W.B. Powell and/or C.A. Fleming off the coast of Owenga Beach, Chatham Islands, at a depth of 18 m (59 ft). The holotype is held by the Auckland War Memorial Museum.

== Distribution and habitat ==
The species is endemic to New Zealand, found in the waters of the Chatham Islands, Bounty Islands, and on Mernoo Bank, at a depth of between 15–165 m (49–541 ft).
