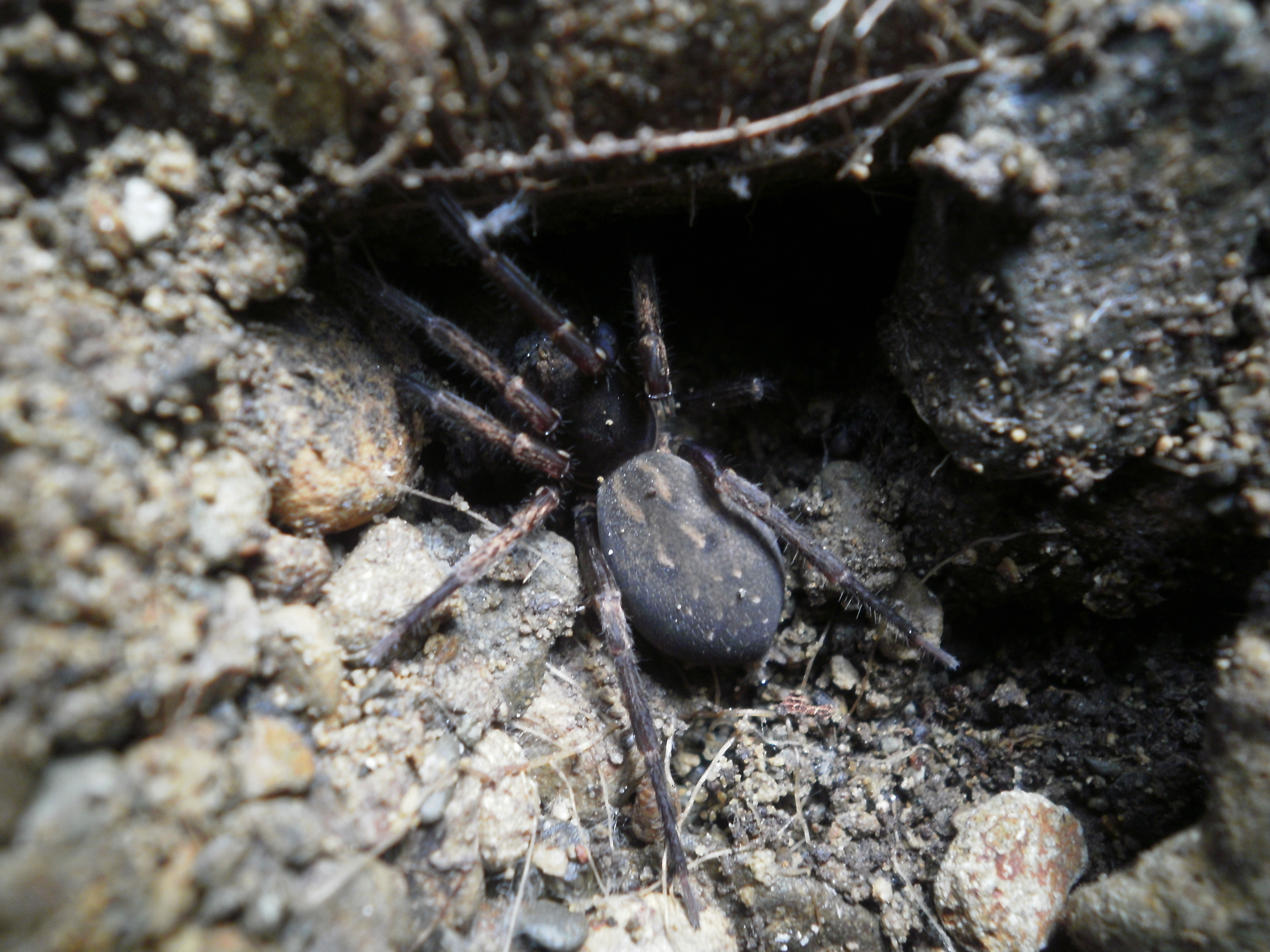
- A Uliodon species

Scientific classification
- Kingdom: Animalia
- Phylum: Arthropoda
- Subphylum: Chelicerata
- Class: Arachnida
- Order: Araneae
- Infraorder: Araneomorphae
- Family: Zoropsidae
- Genus: Uliodon; L. Koch, 1873

= Uliodon =

Genus of spiders

Uliodon is a genus of spiders endemic to New Zealand. They are commonly referred to as vagrant spiders. Vagrant spiders vary in colour from dark brown to almost black, they typically have a body length of 20mm and a 50mm leg span. When alive, the interior of the male's pedipalp are brightly coloured (usually orange).

They are nocturnal hunters, feeding on ground-dwelling invertebrates. During the day they are found under logs and rocks. They can be found in a variety of habitats: native forest and plantations, or more open habitat, but also scree slopes and occasionally in houses.

== Reproduction ==
After mating, the female prepares a chamber lined with silk beneath a log or stone on the forest floor, or inside a rotten log, where they construct a rather large and round egg sac that they guard until the young hatch and disperse. The genus is apparently widespread throughout the country.

== Taxonomy ==
Three species of Uliodon are accepted. However, the three known species are not recognisable based on published descriptions.

- Uliodon albopunctatus (L. Koch, 1873) – New Zealand
- Uliodon cervinus (L. Koch, 1873) – New Zealand
- Uliodon frenatus (L. Koch, 1873) – New Zealand

The males of Uliodon albopunctatus and Uliodon cervinus are undescribed.

In 2003, Robert Raven and Kylie Stumkat considered that the genus was endemic to New Zealand, transferring all the Australian species they reviewed to other genera, and transferred Uliodon from the family Miturgidae to the Zoropsidae. A further species, Uliodon ferrugineus (L. Koch, 1873) found in Australia and not reviewed by Raven and Stumkat, was listed by the World Spider Catalog as of October 2015: However this was reclassified in 2023 as Miturgopelma ferrugineus

Another 40 undescribed species are suspected and may represent several distinct genera.

Species transferred to other genera include:

- Uliodon australiensis (L. Koch, 1873) – Mituliodon tarantulinus (L. Koch, 1873)
- Uliodon maritimus (O. Pickard-Cambridge, 1883) – Amaurobioides maritima O. Pickard-Cambridge, 1883
- Uliodon marmoreus (Hogg, 1896) – Mitzoruga marmorea (Hogg, 1896)
- Uliodon oswaldi (Lenz, 1891) – Zorodictyna oswaldi (Lenz, 1891)
- Uliodon tarantulinus (L. Koch, 1873) – Mituliodon tarantulinus (L. Koch, 1873)
- Uliodon torvus (L. Koch, 1873) – Mituliodon tarantulinus (L. Koch, 1873)

== Toxicology ==
Vagrant spiders are not considered dangerous. However, when mishandled, these spiders tend to inflict a painful bite given their large size. The bites are usually without further consequences, but a case of a bad reaction (pain, swollen skin and stiff joints) was reported in 1971.
