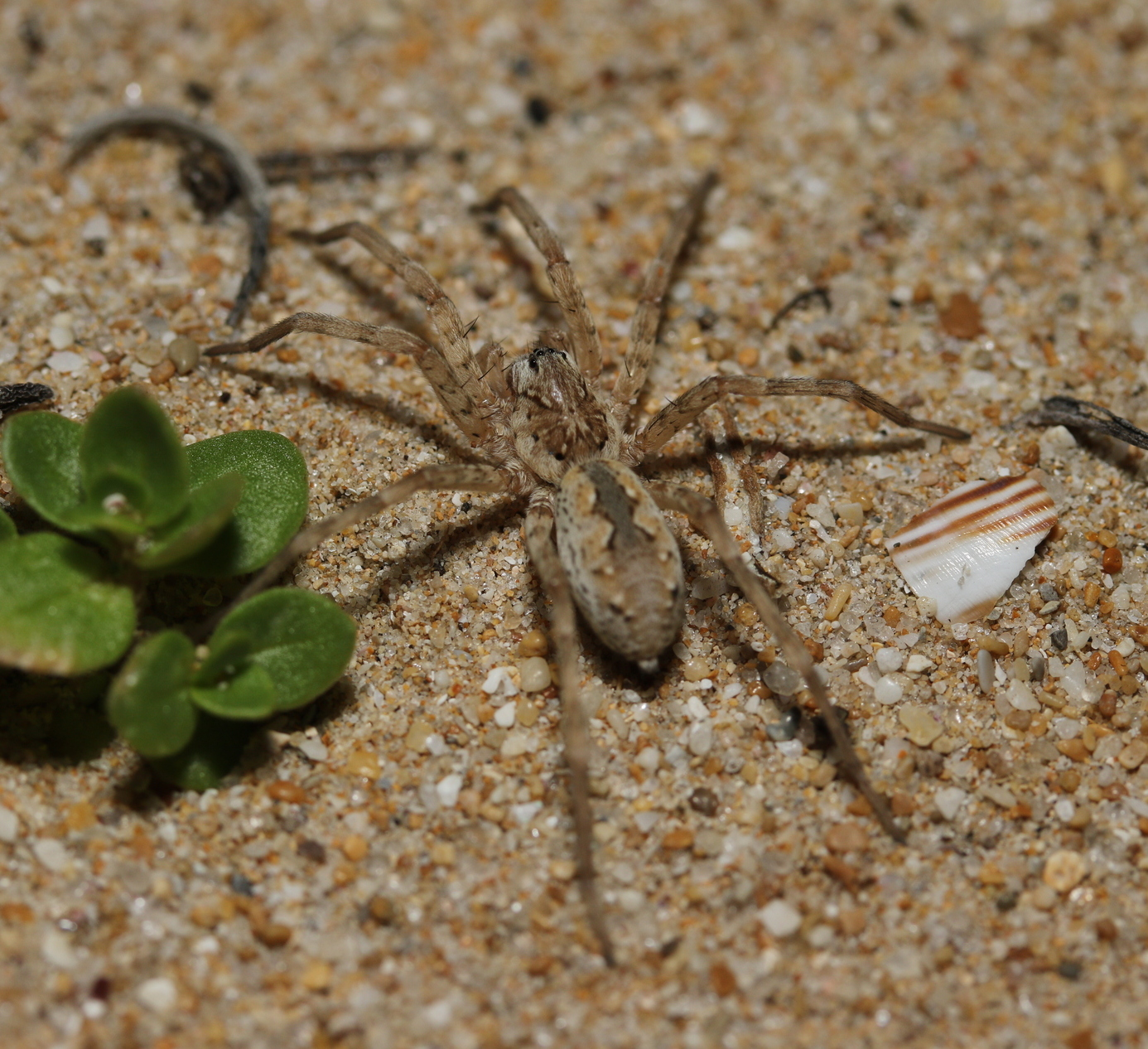
- K. gracilis in Australia

Scientific classification
- Kingdom: Animalia
- Phylum: Arthropoda
- Subphylum: Chelicerata
- Class: Arachnida
- Order: Araneae
- Infraorder: Araneomorphae
- Family: Miturgidae
- Genus: Knotodo; Raven, 2023

Type species
- Odo gracilis Hickman, 1950

Species
- 8, see text

= Knotodo =

Genus of spiders

Knotodo is a genus of spiders in the family Miturgidae.

== Distribution ==
Knotodo is endemic to Australia, with species distributed across the southern and southwestern regions of the continent.

== Etymology ==
The genus name is a combination of knot (in the meaning of "twisted, complex") and the genus Odo Keyserling, 1887, where the type species was first based.

== Species ==
As of January 2026, this genus includes eight species:

- Knotodo coolgardie Raven, 2023 – Australia (Western Australia)
- Knotodo eneabba Raven, 2023 – Australia (Western Australia, South Australia)
- Knotodo gracilis (Hickman, 1950) – Australia (Western Australia, South Australia, Queensland)
- Knotodo muckera Raven, 2023 – Australia (South Australia)
- Knotodo narelleae Raven, 2023 – Australia (Victoria)
- Knotodo nullarbor Raven, 2023 – Australia (South Australia)
- Knotodo shoadi Raven, 2023 – Australia (Victoria)
- Knotodo toolinna Raven, 2023 – Australia (Western Australia)
