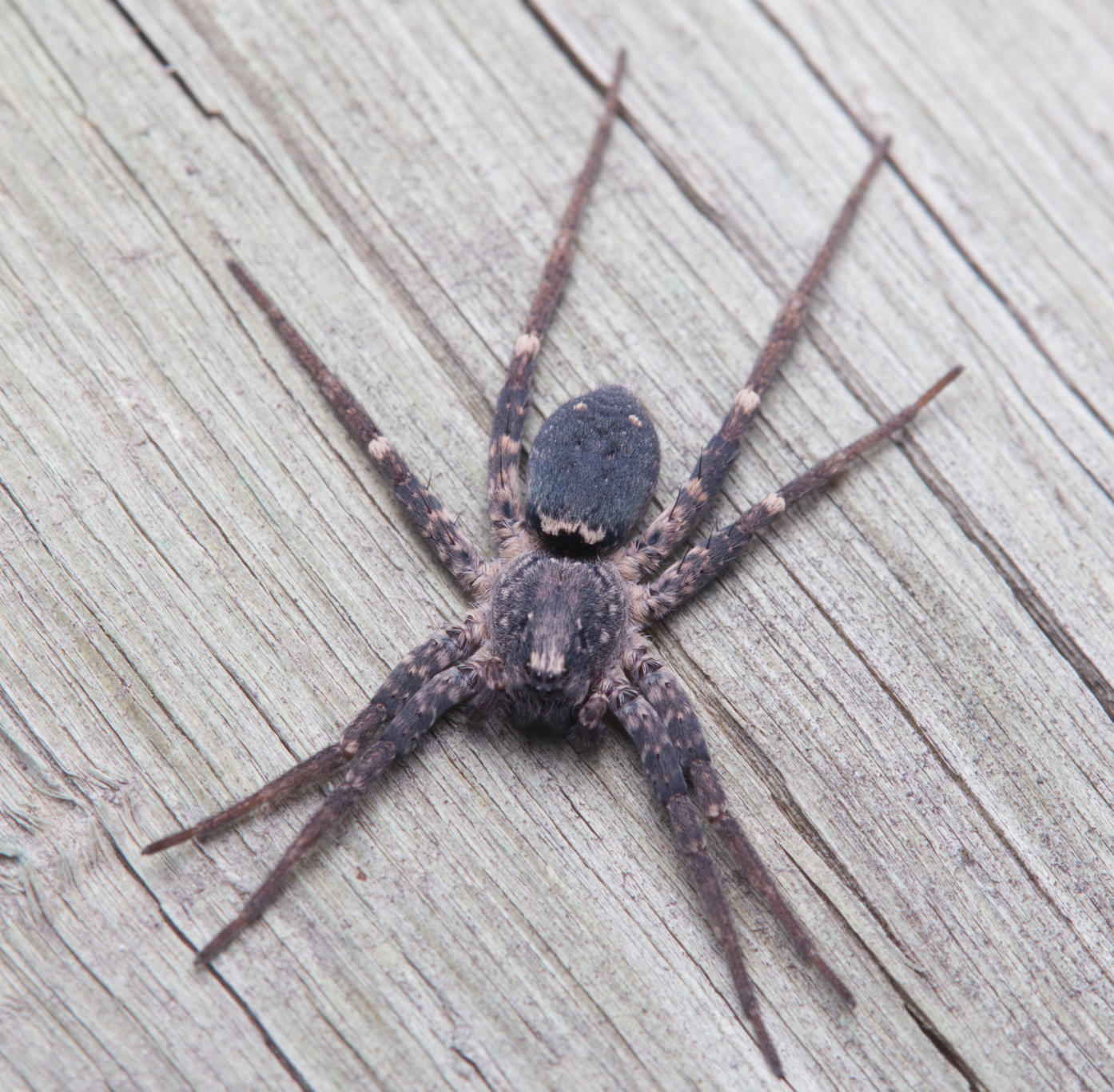
- M. vulgaris in Australia

Scientific classification
- Kingdom: Animalia
- Phylum: Arthropoda
- Subphylum: Chelicerata
- Class: Arachnida
- Order: Araneae
- Infraorder: Araneomorphae
- Family: Miturgidae
- Genus: Miturgiella; Raven, 2023
- Species: M. vulgaris

Binomial name
- Miturgiella vulgaris Raven, 2023

= Miturgiella =

Species of spider

Miturgiella is a monotypic genus of spiders in the family Miturgidae containing the single species, Miturgiella vulgaris.

== Distribution ==
Miturgiella vulgaris has been recorded from Australia (Queensland, New South Wales, Victoria).
