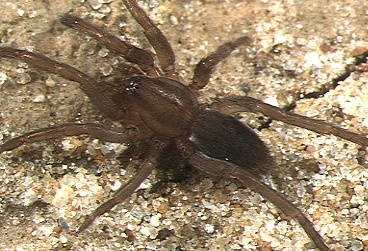
- Female Prochora praticola in Okinawa, Japan

Scientific classification
- Kingdom: Animalia
- Phylum: Arthropoda
- Subphylum: Chelicerata
- Class: Arachnida
- Order: Araneae
- Infraorder: Araneomorphae
- Family: Miturgidae
- Genus: Prochora
- Species: P. praticola

Binomial name
- Prochora praticola (Bösenberg & Strand, 1906)

Synonyms
- Agroeca praticola Bösenberg & Strand, 1906; Talanites dorsilineatus Dönitz & Strand, in Bösenberg & Strand, 1906; Itatsina dorsilineata (Dönitz & Strand, in Bösenberg & Strand, 1906); Itatsina praticola (Bösenberg & Strand, 1906); Coelotes lushanensis Peng & Wang, 1997; Draconarius wulingensis Zhou & Chen, 2016; Prochora praticola (Bösenberg & Strand, 1906)

= Prochora praticola =

Species of spider

Prochora praticola is a species of spider in the family Miturgidae. It is found in China, Korea, and Japan, and was first described by Friedrich Wilhelm Bösenberg and Embrik Strand in 1906 as Agroeca praticola.
