= Xeromiturga =

Scientific classification
- Kingdom: Animalia
- Phylum: Arthropoda
- Subphylum: Chelicerata
- Class: Arachnida
- Order: Araneae
- Infraorder: Araneomorphae
- Family: Miturgidae
- Genus: Xeromiturga; Raven, 2023

Type species
- X. gumbardo Raven, 2023

Species
- 4, see text

Genus of spiders

Xeromiturga is a genus of spiders in the family Miturgidae.

== Distribution ==
Xeromiturga is endemic to Australia.

== Species ==
As of January 2026, this genus includes four species:

- Xeromiturga bidgemia Raven, 2023 – Western Australia
- Xeromiturga gumbardo Raven, 2023 – South Australia, Queensland
- Xeromiturga mardathuna Raven, 2023 – Western Australia
- Xeromiturga pilbara Raven, 2023 – Western Australia
