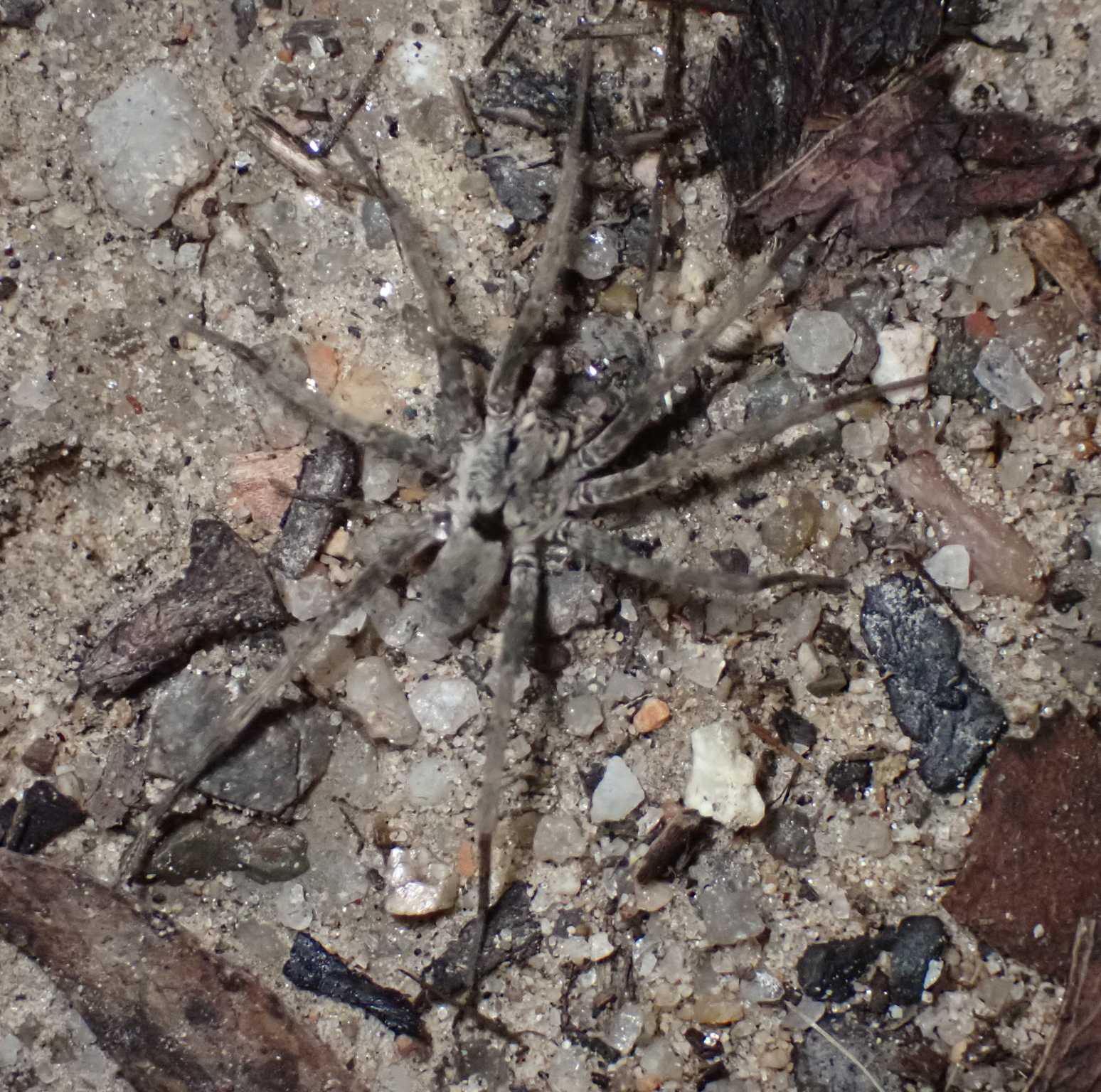
- M. alanyeni

Scientific classification
- Kingdom: Animalia
- Phylum: Arthropoda
- Subphylum: Chelicerata
- Class: Arachnida
- Order: Araneae
- Infraorder: Araneomorphae
- Family: Miturgidae
- Genus: Miturgopelma; Raven, 2023

Type species
- M. alanyeni Raven, 2023

Species
- 34, see text

= Miturgopelma =

Genus of spiders

Miturgopelma is a genus of spiders in the family Miturgidae.

== Distribution ==
The genus Miturgopelma is endemic to Australia, with species occurring across all mainland states and Tasmania.

== Species ==
As of January 2026, this genus includes 34 species:

- Miturgopelma alanyeni Raven, 2023 – Australia (South Australia, Queensland, New South Wales, Victoria)
- Miturgopelma archeri Raven, 2023 – Australia (Queensland)
- Miturgopelma australiense (Hickman, 1944) – Australia (Northern Territory, Queensland, South Australia)
- Miturgopelma baehrae Raven, 2023 – Australia (Western Australia)
- Miturgopelma bandalup Raven, 2023 – Australia (Western Australia)
- Miturgopelma biancahilleryae Raven, 2023 – Australia (Queensland)
- Miturgopelma bogantungan Raven, 2023 – Australia (Queensland)
- Miturgopelma brachychiton Raven, 2023 – Australia (Queensland)
- Miturgopelma brevirostra Raven, 2023 – Australia (Western Australia)
- Miturgopelma buckaringa Raven, 2023 – Australia (South Australia, Victoria)
- Miturgopelma bungabiddy Raven, 2023 – Australia (Western Australia, South Australia)
- Miturgopelma caitlinae Raven, 2023 – Australia (Northern Territory)
- Miturgopelma calperum Raven, 2023 – Australia (South Australia)
- Miturgopelma couperi Raven, 2023 – Australia (Western Australia)
- Miturgopelma culgoa Raven, 2023 – Australia (Queensland)
- Miturgopelma echidna Raven, 2023 – Australia (Western Australia, South Australia, Queensland, New South Wales, Victoria)
- Miturgopelma echinoides Raven, 2023 – Australia (Western Australia, Queensland)
- Miturgopelma ferrugineum (L. Koch, 1873) – Australia
- Miturgopelma harveyi Raven, 2023 – Australia (Western Australia)
- Miturgopelma hebronae Raven, 2023 – Australia (South Australia)
- Miturgopelma kinchega Raven, 2023 – Australia (New South Wales)
- Miturgopelma maningrida Raven, 2023 – Australia (Northern Territory)
- Miturgopelma minderoo Raven, 2023 – Australia (Western Australia)
- Miturgopelma oakleigh Raven, 2023 – Australia (Queensland)
- Miturgopelma paruwi Raven, 2023 – Australia (New South Wales, Tasmania)
- Miturgopelma personatum Gallery, 2026 – Australia (South Australia)
- Miturgopelma rangerstaceyae Raven, 2023 – Australia (Queensland)
- Miturgopelma rar Raven, 2023 – Australia (South Australia, Queensland)
- Miturgopelma rixi Raven, 2023 – Australia (Western Australia)
- Miturgopelma sieda Raven, 2023 – Australia (Western Australia)
- Miturgopelma spinisterne Raven, 2023 – Australia (Queensland)
- Miturgopelma watarrka Raven, 2023 – Australia (Western Australia, Northern Territory, South Australia, Queensland)
- Miturgopelma woz Raven, 2023 – Australia (Western Australia)
- Miturgopelma yarmina Raven, 2023 – Australia (Queensland)
