= Tamin pseudodrassus =

Scientific classification
- Domain: Eukaryota
- Kingdom: Animalia
- Phylum: Arthropoda
- Subphylum: Chelicerata
- Class: Arachnida
- Order: Araneae
- Infraorder: Araneomorphae
- Family: Miturgidae
- Genus: Tamin
- Species: T. pseudodrassus

Binomial name
- Tamin pseudodrassus Deeleman-Reinhold, 2001

Species of arachnid

Tamin pseudodrassus is a species of long-legged sac spiders.
