= Pacificana =

Genus of spiders

Pacificana is a genus of spiders in the family Cycloctenidae. It was first described in 1904 by Hogg. As of 2026, it contains only one species, Pacificana cockayni (Pacific Bounty hunter), found only on the Bounty Islands in New Zealand.

== Taxonomy ==
Pacificana
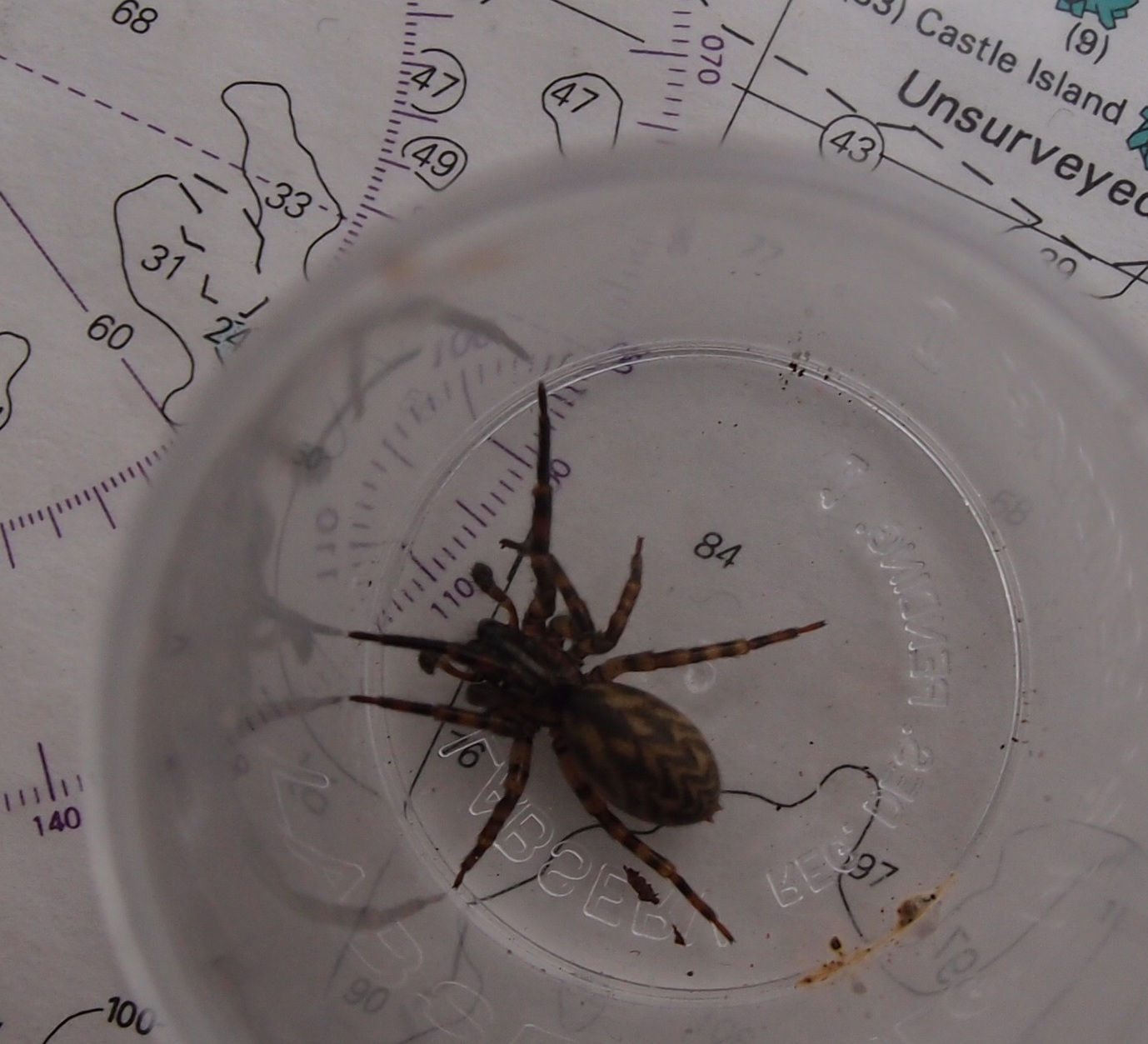
- Adult male

Conservation status
- Naturally Uncommon (NZ TCS)

Scientific classification
- Kingdom: Animalia
- Phylum: Arthropoda
- Subphylum: Chelicerata
- Class: Arachnida
- Order: Araneae
- Infraorder: Araneomorphae
- Family: Cycloctenidae
- Genus: Pacificana
- Species: P. cockayni

Binomial name
- Pacificana cockayni Hogg, 1904

Both the genus and species were described in 1904 by Henry Roughton Hogg from a subadult male and several female specimens. A female syntype specimen is stored in Otago Museum. with the remainder assumed to be in the Natural History Museum, London.

A lack of distinctive characters meant this species has been difficult to assign to a family. First described in Agelenidae it was later transferred to Amaurobioididae (now Anyphaeneidae) and Miturgidae before a combination of morphological data (including the description of the male) and molecular analysis allowed it be placed in Cycloctenidae.

== Description ==
Female body length ranges from 12.7 to 22 mm. The cephalothorax is dark brown with yellow markings on the carapace. The legs are yellow and ringed with brown bands. The abdomen has yellow and black stripes dorsally.

Male body length is between 12.2 and 14.7 mm. Colouring is similar to the female, but with more extensive yellow markings on the carapace.

== Distribution ==
This species is only known from the Bounty Islands in New Zealand.

== Biology ==
This spider is known to make silk retreats under rocks in bird colonies. They are assumed to emerge from these retreats to hunt insect prey.

== Conservation status ==
Under the New Zealand Threat Classification System, this species is listed as "Naturally Uncommon" with the qualifiers of "Climate Impact", "Data Poor: Trend", "Island Endemic" and "One Location".
