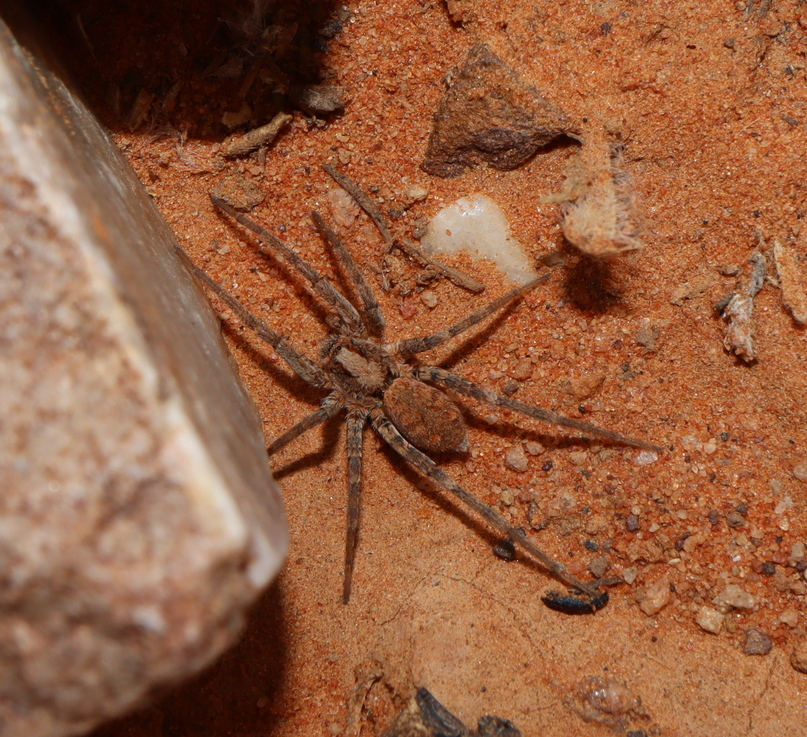
- Xistera sp.
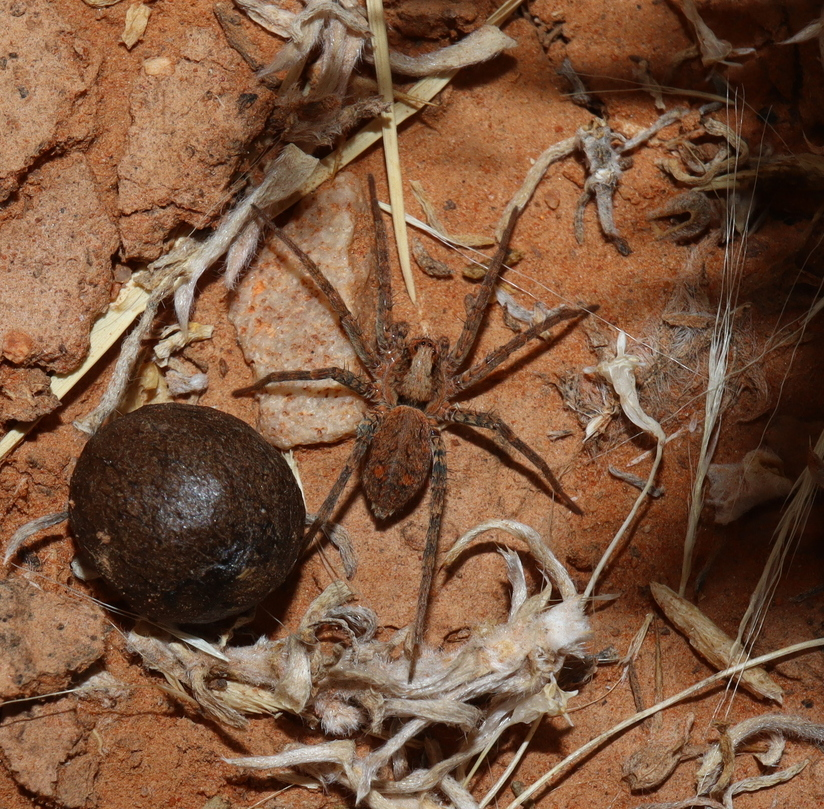
- Xistera sp.

Scientific classification
- Kingdom: Animalia
- Phylum: Arthropoda
- Subphylum: Chelicerata
- Class: Arachnida
- Order: Araneae
- Infraorder: Araneomorphae
- Family: Miturgidae
- Genus: Xistera; Raven, 2023

Type species
- X. auriphila Raven, 2023

Species
- 5, see text

= Xistera =

Genus of spiders

Xistera is a genus of spiders in the family Miturgidae.

== Distribution ==
Xistera is endemic to Australia.

== Species ==
As of January 2026, this genus includes five species:

- Xistera auriphila Raven, 2023 – Australia (Western Australia)
- Xistera barlee Raven, 2023 – Australia (Western Australia)
- Xistera coventryi Raven, 2023 – Australia (South Australia, Queensland, New South Wales, Victoria)
- Xistera jandateae Raven, 2023 – Australia (South Australia, Queensland)
- Xistera serpentine Raven, 2023 – Australia (South Australia)
