= Voraptus tenellus =

Conservation status
- Critically Endangered (IUCN 3.1)

Scientific classification
- Kingdom: Animalia
- Phylum: Arthropoda
- Subphylum: Chelicerata
- Class: Arachnida
- Order: Araneae
- Infraorder: Araneomorphae
- Family: Miturgidae
- Genus: Voraptus
- Species: V. tenellus

Binomial name
- Voraptus tenellus (Simon, 1893)

Synonyms
- Dendrolycosa tenella Simon, 1893

Species of spider

Voraptus tenellus is a species of spider that is endemic to Mahé and Silhouette Island of Seychelles.
