= Zoroides =

Scientific classification
- Domain: Eukaryota
- Kingdom: Animalia
- Phylum: Arthropoda
- Subphylum: Chelicerata
- Class: Arachnida
- Order: Araneae
- Infraorder: Araneomorphae
- Family: Miturgidae
- Genus: Zoroides
- Species: Z. dalmasi

Binomial name
- Zoroides dalmasi Berland, 1924

Genus of spiders

Zoroides is a genus of spiders in the family Miturgidae. It was first described in 1924 by Berland. As of 2017, it contains only one species, Zoroides dalmasi, found in New Caledonia.
