= Voraptus =

Scientific classification
- Kingdom: Animalia
- Phylum: Arthropoda
- Subphylum: Chelicerata
- Class: Arachnida
- Order: Araneae
- Infraorder: Araneomorphae
- Family: Miturgidae
- Genus: Voraptus; Simon, 1898

Genus of spiders

Voraptus is a genus of spiders in the family Pisauridae (formerly in Miturgidae).

== Species ==
As of October 2025, this genus includes six species:

- Voraptus aerius Simon, 1898 – DR Congo
- Voraptus affinis Lessert, 1925 – South Africa
- Voraptus exilipes (Lucas, 1858) – Gabon
- Voraptus extensus Lessert, 1916 – Tanzania
- Voraptus orientalis Hogg, 1919 – Indonesia (Sumatra)
- Voraptus tenellus (Simon, 1893) – Seychelles (type species)
