= Diallomus fuliginosus =

Scientific classification
- Kingdom: Animalia
- Phylum: Arthropoda
- Subphylum: Chelicerata
- Class: Arachnida
- Order: Araneae
- Infraorder: Araneomorphae
- Family: Ctenidae
- Genus: Diallomus
- Species: D. fuliginosus

Binomial name
- Diallomus fuliginosus Simon, 1897

Species of spider

Diallomus fuliginosus, is a species of spider of the genus Diallomus. It is endemic to Sri Lanka.
