= Matoaka (1853 ship) =

Canadian full-rigged vessel

Matoaka (also listed as Mataoka) was a 1092-ton wooden New Brunswick full-rigged ship built in 1853 for Willis, Gunn, & Co. She was sold to Shaw, Savill, & Albion by 1859. Between 1859 and 1869 she made eight voyages to New Zealand. Her fastest run from Bristol to Lyttelton, New Zealand was 82 days in 1862. On 13 May 1869 she left Lyttelton for London under Captain Alfred Stevens with 45 passengers and 32 crew but was never seen again. In 1865 she was classed as 1322 tons.

== First voyage to New Zealand ==
The Matoaka first sailed with about 100 passengers from London to New Zealand under Captain Stevens on 13 June 1859 on the clipper route. She arrived at Wellington on 13 September and then sailed north to Auckland on 17 September 1859. Off Castlepoint she ran into a northerly gale which split several of her sails and forced her to hove-to for twelve hours.

The migrants on board the Matoaka included Thomas Ball. His family and a group of some 80 migrants he had gathered together had arranged settle at Mangonui under Government sponsored land grants. On arrival the 40 acre men as the land grant migrants were known found that the Government had changed its regulations and instead of being allocated land they had to bid for it. This caused an outcry.

== Icebergs ==
On 25 December 1866 while sailing from London to Lyttelton she sailed into a vast field of ice-bergs at 48.32 south 114.40 east in the South Indian Ocean in about near Kerguelen Island. Some of the bergs were described as 300 ft to 400 ft in height.

== Bird life ==
Captain Stevens brought out English song birds for the Canterbury Acclimatisation Society. On 10 January 1867 he arrived with a large number of starlings, larks, blackbirds, thrushes, pheasants, and partridges. He followed this in 1868 with twelve pairs of thrushes, 77 pairs of blackbirds, 22 house sparrows, 7 redpolls, 1 yellowhammer, 1 pair bramble finches, and 1 robin. His third and final shipment was in 1869.

By 1879 the house sparrows were being described as a pest, with the Acclimatisation Society being blamed for their introduction.

== List of voyages ==
- Liverpool to Sydney - sailed on 21 February 1855
- London to Wellington/Auckland - sailed 13 June 1859 arrived Wellington 13 September and Auckland 26 September under Captain Stevens (she was noted as the largest vessel to sail for New Zealand to that date) (Passenger List)
- Auckland to London via Callao and the Chincha Islands - sailed 18 October 1859 Her cargo was guano from Chincha.
- Bristol to Lyttelton - sailed 4 September 1860 arrived Lyttelton 1 December. James FitzGerald was a passenger on this journey. Fitzgerald's voyage was paid by the Provincial Government and cost £260 for a cabin for him, his wife, and their five children. In contrast the total cost for all the emigrants was £1,025. She carried 293 passengers of which most were under the auspices of the Emigration Commissioners. (Passenger List)
- Lyttelton to Guam - sailed 31 December 1860
- Plymouth to Lyttelton - sailed 20 November 1861 arrived Lyttelton 10 February 1862 (Passenger List)
- Lyttelton to Guam - sailed 8 March 1862
- London to Port Chalmers - sailed 10 April 1863 arrived Port Chalmers 4 July 1863 with the Reverend Thomas H Campbell, Head Master of Dunedin High School and several High School Masters. While taking their children and belongings on the Pride of the Yarra from the Matoaka to Dunedin the Campbell family were drowned in a collision between the Favorite and the Pride of Yarra in Port Chalmers harbour.
- Port Chalmers to Callao - sailed 23 August 1863
- London to Auckland - sailed 17 September 1864 arrived Auckland 3 January 1865 under Captain W C Barnett. Bought a silver cup donated by Shaw Savill for cargo boats competing in the Auckland Regatta. This cup was first competed for in the 25th New Zealand anniversary Auckland Regatta. While in port a seaman, Isaac Isaacson, deserted the ship, was arrested and sentenced to three months imprisonment. There were two further deserters, William Thomas and William Lloyd, who also ended up in prison.
- Auckland to Point de Galle - sailed 22 January 1865 and arrived 19 July 1865
- Point de Galle to London via Calcutta - sailed 6 September 1865 - sailed from Calcutta 25 February 1866
- London to Lyttelton - sailed 7 October 1866 arrived Lyttelton 10 January 1867 under Captain Stevens. Encountered a large field of ice-bergs in the Southern Ocean.
- Lyttelton to London - 2 May 1867 with a cargo of wool and wheat,
- London to Lyttelton - sailed 16 November 1867 arrived Lyttelton 11 February 1868. Captain Stevens bought a second shipment of birds for the Acclimatisation Society on this voyage. (Passenger List)
- Lyttelton to Sydney - sailed April/May 1868
- Sydney to London - sailed 10 May 1868
- London to Lyttelton - sailed 12 November 1868 arrived Lyttelton 8 February 1869. Suffragist Kate Sheppard and her family were passengers on this trip.
- Lyttelton to London - sailed 11 May 1869 - missing without trace

== Final voyage ==
The Matoaka sailed from Lyttelton for London on 11 May 1869. She had 44 passengers on board together with a cargo of wool, flour, tallow, flax, skins, and assorted items. She was the last ship of the season to sail and would be taking the clipper route around Cape Horn. Unknown to all on board, except for the officers, was she was carrying £50,000 in gold.

She was noted as overdue by September 1869. By 8 December 1869 she was considered lost. No other ships reported sighting her.

In July 1870 there was a report that the Matoaka's Captain had intimated to a former passenger that would be sailing further south than other Captains were prepared to. The report went on to state that if this were the case then he was more likely to have run into ice.

== Rumours and messages from the dead ==
A short while later two rumours of sightings were reported. In one an American ship said it saw a large sailing ship with only its foremast standing, and another report said the Matoaka had been driven ashore in America. This was followed a short while later in late February 1870 by a telegram announcing that the Matoaka had arrived in London. These sighting and messages all proved untrue and the ship was declared by Lloyd's as missing, presumed sunk by ice in the Southern Ocean.

These claims were followed in June 1870 by a letter to the Evening Star from an unnamed spiritualist that claimed to have been told through a medium that the ship had been wrecked on the Auckland Islands and that the passengers had survived. This was followed by a further claim that at a seance word was received that HMS Blanche was sailing to the Bounty Islands. It would then sail to the Auckland Islands and find remnants of the crew and passengers.

In May 1872 a bottle containing a supposed message from the ships First Mate was discovered on St Kilda Beach, Dunedin. The message claimed that some of the crew were adrift in a life boat to the north of New Guinea. Examination of the hand writing found no comparison with that of the first mate and the message was dismissed as a cruel hoax.

== Search ==
=== Bounty Islands ===
In May 1870 a deputation from the families of those on board sought assistance from the New Zealand Premier, William Fox, to mount a search of the Bounty Islands in case the ship had been driven there by bad weather. On 29 June HMS Rosario sailed from Auckland to the Bounty Islands arriving on 8 July. Captain Palmer described the islands as barren, destitute, and exposed to the fury of the sea. They were in his opinion no more than a dangerous group of rocks on which no-one could survive. He did take the opportunity to annex the islands for New Zealand. No sign of anything relating to the Matoaka was seen.

=== Auckland Islands ===
Prior to this the Admiralty had received a letter from a John Knowles who was on the Alexander Duthie which said they had passed Enderby Island in January and seen smoke from a fire. On the basis of that letter, in April, the Admiralty ordered Commodore Lambert of Australia Station to make a search of the Auckland Islands for the missing ship. HMS Blanche sailed for the islands from Sydney on 2 July, arriving ten days later. A thorough but unsuccessful search was made by the crews of the Blanche and the Daphne, which was also there.

=== South Georgia ===
A search was also made of the South Georgia's because of fires being reported there.
