= Depot Island (Bounty Islands) =

Island in the Bounty Islands, New Zealand

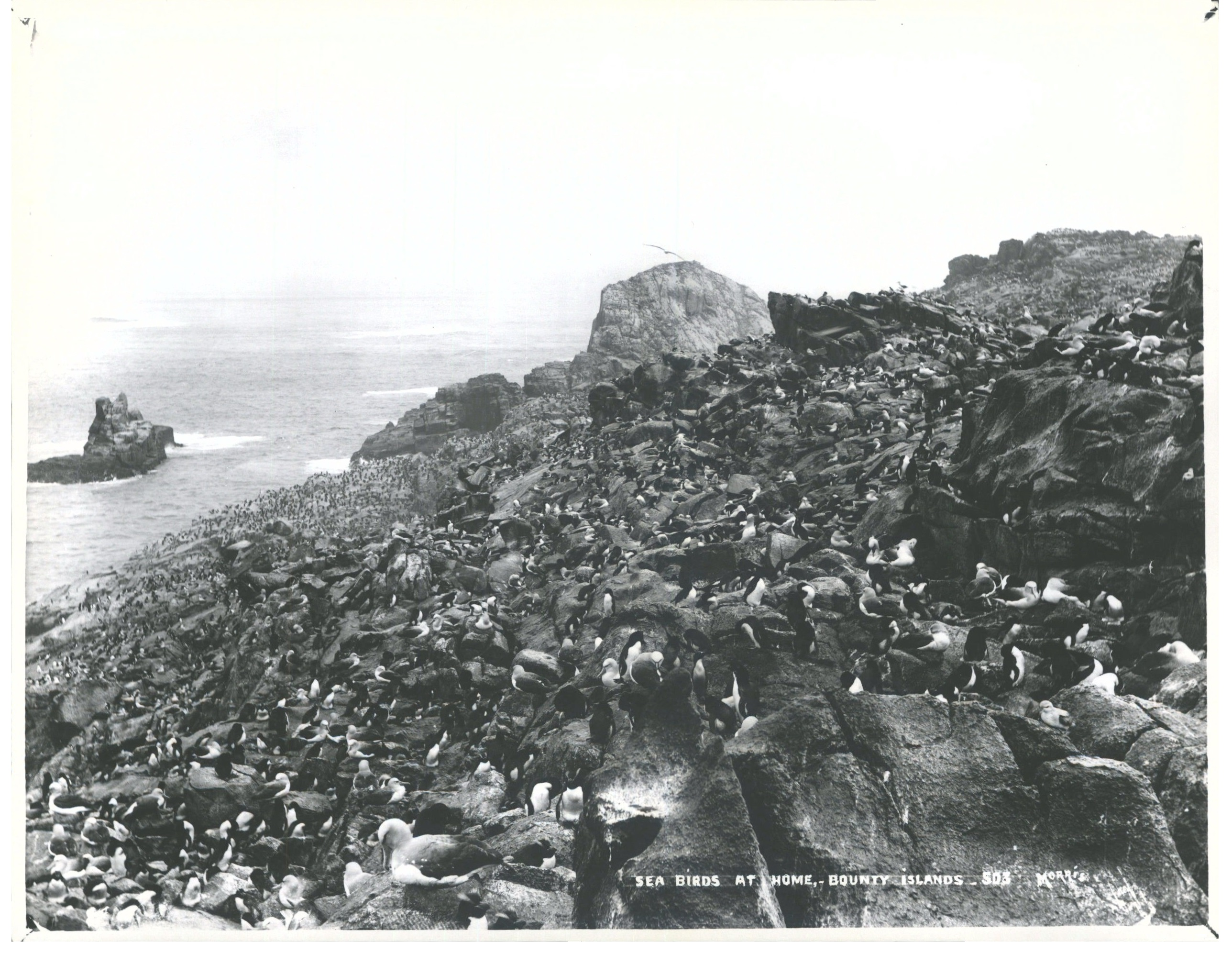
- Depot Island, covered with birds

- Map of the Bounty Islands, showing Depot island in the northwest

- Location of Depot Island within the Pacific Ocean

Geography
- Coordinates: 47°45′05″S 179°01′25″E
- Archipelago: Bounty Islands
- Area: 0.1 km^{2} (0.039 sq mi)
- Length: 0.4 km (0.25 mi)
- Width: 0.3 km (0.19 mi)
- Highest elevation: 50 m (160 ft)

Administration
- New Zealand

Demographics
- Population: 0

Depot Island is the largest island in the Bounty Islands, a chain of uninhabited subantarctic islands 800 kilometres off the southeast coast of New Zealand's South Island. The island is an important bird nesting site, and is located within the Moutere Hauriri / Bounty Islands Marine Reserve.

Depot Island lies at the centre of the Bounties' main group, in the northwest of the chain. It is surrounded by numerous smaller islands, notably Proclamation, Ruatara, Spider, Penguin, Tunnel, and Ranfurly Islands. It is a roughly triangular slab of bare igneous rock, some 400 metres in length and covering an area of 10 hectares (25 acres). It is separated from its nearest neighbours (Tunnel and Ranfurly Islands) by a narrow straight channel which delineates the island's northeastern side. The island has only one inlet, in the southwest, but, like the rest of the chain, this is unsuitable for anchorage owing to a reef which protects much of the island's coast. Depot Island rises to an unnamed peak near its centre at 50 metres (160 ft) above sea level.

The island, along with the others in the chain, was discovered by Captain William Bligh in 1788, and named them after his ship, just months before the famous mutiny on the ship which gave the islands their name.

Depot Island's name reflects the location of a castaway depot on the island, set up in 1886 by the crew from the Hinemoa. Captain Fairchild noted that there was no fresh water available on these islands. The depot had been destroyed by the sea by the time the Stella visited the island in 1887, but was later replenished. Depot provisioning is no longer present on the island, and little remains of the depot.
