= Teminius affinis =

Scientific classification
- Kingdom: Animalia
- Phylum: Arthropoda
- Subphylum: Chelicerata
- Class: Arachnida
- Order: Araneae
- Infraorder: Araneomorphae
- Family: Miturgidae
- Genus: Teminius
- Species: T. affinis

Binomial name
- Teminius affinis Banks, 1897

Species of spider

Teminius affinis is a species of prowling spider in the family Miturgidae. It is found in the United States and Mexico.
