= Septsigilla =

Scientific classification
- Kingdom: Animalia
- Phylum: Arthropoda
- Subphylum: Chelicerata
- Class: Arachnida
- Order: Araneae
- Infraorder: Araneomorphae
- Family: Miturgidae
- Genus: Septsigilla; H. B. Zhang & F. Zhang, 2025

Type species
- S. tongbiguan H. B. Zhang & F. Zhang, 2025

Species
- 2, see text

Genus of spiders

Septsigilla is a genus of spiders in the family Miturgidae.

== Distribution ==
Septsigilla is known only from China.

== Etymology ==
The genus name is a combination of Latin "septem" and "sigilla", referring to the seven sigilla on the sternum of these spiders.

S. tongbiguan is named after the type locality, Tongbiguan Town (铜壁关; Tóng bì guān) in Yingjiang County. S. zhongi is named in honor of botanist Zhong Yang (钟扬; Zhōng Yáng) (1964–2017), who contributed to the conservation of biodiversity in Xizang.

== Species ==
As of January 2026, this genus includes two species:

- Septsigilla tongbiguan H. B. Zhang & F. Zhang, 2025 – China (Yunnan)
- Septsigilla zhongi H. B. Zhang & F. Zhang, 2025 – China (Xizang)
