= Odomasta =

Scientific classification
- Kingdom: Animalia
- Phylum: Arthropoda
- Subphylum: Chelicerata
- Class: Arachnida
- Order: Araneae
- Infraorder: Araneomorphae
- Family: Miturgidae
- Genus: Odomasta
- Species: O. guttipes

Binomial name
- Odomasta guttipes (Simon, 1903)

Genus of spiders

Odomasta is a genus of spiders in the family Miturgidae. It was first described in 1909 by Simon. As of 2017, it contains only one species, Odomasta guttipes, found in Tasmania.
