= Simonus =

Scientific classification
- Domain: Eukaryota
- Kingdom: Animalia
- Phylum: Arthropoda
- Subphylum: Chelicerata
- Class: Arachnida
- Order: Araneae
- Infraorder: Araneomorphae
- Family: Miturgidae
- Genus: Simonus; Ritsema

Species
- Simonus lineatus (Simon, 1880)

Genus of spiders

Simonus is a genus of spiders in the family Miturgidae. It was first described in 1881 by Ritsema. As of 2016, it contains only one species, Simonus lineatus, from Western Australia.
