= Nuliodon =

Scientific classification
- Domain: Eukaryota
- Kingdom: Animalia
- Phylum: Arthropoda
- Subphylum: Chelicerata
- Class: Arachnida
- Order: Araneae
- Infraorder: Araneomorphae
- Family: Miturgidae
- Genus: Nuliodon
- Species: N. fishburni

Binomial name
- Nuliodon fishburni Raven, 2009

Genus of spiders

Nuliodon is a genus of spiders in the family Miturgidae. It was first described in 2009 by Raven. As of 2017, it contains only one species, Nuliodon fishburni, found in Queensland.
