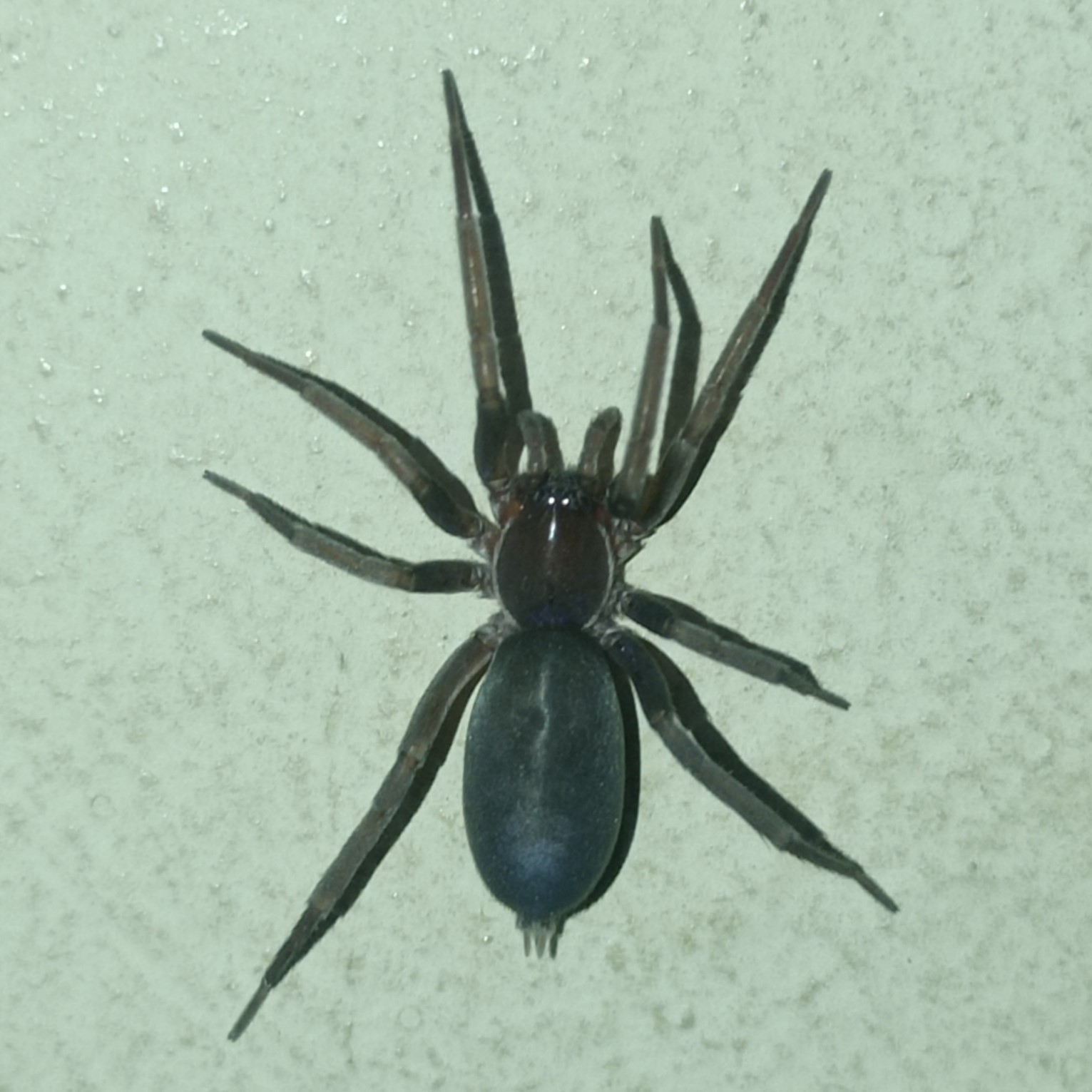

Scientific classification
- Kingdom: Animalia
- Phylum: Arthropoda
- Subphylum: Chelicerata
- Class: Arachnida
- Order: Araneae
- Infraorder: Araneomorphae
- Family: Miturgidae
- Genus: Palicanus
- Species: P. caudatus

Binomial name
- Palicanus caudatus Thorell, 1897

= Palicanus =

Genus of spiders

Palicanus is a genus of spiders in the family Miturgidae. It was first described in 1897 by Thorell. As of 2017, it contains only one species, Palicanus caudatus, found in Myanmar, China, Indonesia, and the Seychelles.
