= Mitzoruga =

Scientific classification
- Domain: Eukaryota
- Kingdom: Animalia
- Phylum: Arthropoda
- Subphylum: Chelicerata
- Class: Arachnida
- Order: Araneae
- Infraorder: Araneomorphae
- Family: Miturgidae
- Genus: Mitzoruga; Raven

Species
- Mitzoruga elapines Raven, 2009; Mitzoruga insularis Raven, 2009; Mitzoruga marmorea (Hogg, 1896)

Genus of spiders

Mitzoruga is a genus of spiders in the family Miturgidae. It was first described in 2009 by Raven. As of 2016, it contains 3 species.
