= Hestimodema =

Scientific classification
- Kingdom: Animalia
- Phylum: Arthropoda
- Subphylum: Chelicerata
- Class: Arachnida
- Order: Araneae
- Infraorder: Araneomorphae
- Family: Miturgidae
- Genus: Hestimodema; Simon

Species
- Hestimodema ambigua Simon, 1909; Hestimodema latevittata Simon, 1909

Genus of spiders

Hestimodema is a genus of spiders in the family Miturgidae. It was first described in 1909 by Simon. As of 2016, it contains 2 species from western Australia.
