= Eupograpta =

Scientific classification
- Domain: Eukaryota
- Kingdom: Animalia
- Phylum: Arthropoda
- Subphylum: Chelicerata
- Class: Arachnida
- Order: Araneae
- Infraorder: Araneomorphae
- Family: Miturgidae
- Genus: Eupograpta; Raven

Species
- Eupograpta anhat Raven, 2009; Eupograpta kottae Raven, 2009

Genus of spiders

Eupograpta is a genus of spiders in the family Miturgidae. It was first described in 2009 by Raven. As of 2016, it contains 2 Australian species.
