= Tamin (spider) =

Scientific classification
- Domain: Eukaryota
- Kingdom: Animalia
- Phylum: Arthropoda
- Subphylum: Chelicerata
- Class: Arachnida
- Order: Araneae
- Infraorder: Araneomorphae
- Family: Miturgidae
- Genus: Tamin; Deeleman-Reinhold, 2001

Type species
- T. pseudodrassus Deeleman-Reinhold, 2001

Species
- Tamin pseudodrassus Deeleman-Reinhold, 2001 — Borneo, Sulawesi; Tamin simoni Deeleman-Reinhold, 2001 — Borneo

Genus of spiders

Tamin is a genus of Indonesian long-legged sac spiders first described by Christa Deeleman-Reinhold in 2001. As of April 2019 it contains only two species.
