= Teminius =

Scientific classification
- Kingdom: Animalia
- Phylum: Arthropoda
- Subphylum: Chelicerata
- Class: Arachnida
- Order: Araneae
- Infraorder: Araneomorphae
- Family: Miturgidae
- Genus: Teminius; Keyserling, 1887

Type species
- Teminius insularis Keyserling, 1887

Species
- See text.

Genus of spiders

Teminius is a genus of spiders in the family Miturgidae. It was first described in 1887 by Keyserling.

== Species ==
As of February 2016, the World Spider Catalog accepted four species:

- Teminius affinis Banks, 1897 – US, Mexico
- Teminius agalenoides (Badcock, 1932) – Paraguay, Argentina
- Teminius hirsutus (Petrunkevitch, 1925) – Mexico to Venezuela, the Caribbean
- Teminius insularis (Lucas, 1857) – US, Greater Antilles to Argentina
