= Thasyraea =

Scientific classification
- Domain: Eukaryota
- Kingdom: Animalia
- Phylum: Arthropoda
- Subphylum: Chelicerata
- Class: Arachnida
- Order: Araneae
- Infraorder: Araneomorphae
- Family: Miturgidae
- Genus: Thasyraea; Koch

Species
- Thasyraea lepida L. Koch, 1878; Thasyraea ornata L. Koch, 1878

Genus of spiders

Thasyraea is a genus of spiders in the family Miturgidae. It was first described in 1878 by L. Koch. As of 2016, it contains 2 Australian species.
