= Parapostenus =

Scientific classification
- Kingdom: Animalia
- Phylum: Arthropoda
- Subphylum: Chelicerata
- Class: Arachnida
- Order: Araneae
- Infraorder: Araneomorphae
- Family: Miturgidae
- Genus: Parapostenus; Lessert, 1923
- Species: P. hewitti

Binomial name
- Parapostenus hewitti Lessert, 1923

Genus of spiders

Parapostenus is a monotypic genus of spiders in the family Miturgidae. It was first described in 1923 by Roger de Lessert. Its only described species, Parapostenus hewitti, is endemic to South Africa and Lesotho.
