= Elassoctenus =

Scientific classification
- Kingdom: Animalia
- Phylum: Arthropoda
- Subphylum: Chelicerata
- Class: Arachnida
- Order: Araneae
- Infraorder: Araneomorphae
- Family: Miturgidae
- Genus: Elassoctenus
- Species: E. harpax

Binomial name
- Elassoctenus harpax Simon, 1909

Genus of spiders

Elassoctenus is a genus of spiders in the family Miturgidae. It was first described in 1909 by Simon. As of 2017, it contains only one species, Elassoctenus harpax, found in western Australia.
