= Xantharia =

Scientific classification
- Domain: Eukaryota
- Kingdom: Animalia
- Phylum: Arthropoda
- Subphylum: Chelicerata
- Class: Arachnida
- Order: Araneae
- Infraorder: Araneomorphae
- Family: Miturgidae
- Genus: Xantharia; Deeleman-Reinhold

Species
- Xantharia floreni Deeleman-Reinhold, 2001; Xantharia galea Zhang, Zhang & Fu, 2010; Xantharia murphyi Deeleman-Reinhold, 2001

Genus of spiders

Xantharia is a genus of spiders in the family Miturgidae. It was first described in 2001 by Deeleman-Reinhold. As of 2016, it contains 3 Asian species.
