= Israzorides =

Scientific classification
- Domain: Eukaryota
- Kingdom: Animalia
- Phylum: Arthropoda
- Subphylum: Chelicerata
- Class: Arachnida
- Order: Araneae
- Infraorder: Araneomorphae
- Family: Miturgidae
- Genus: Israzorides
- Species: I. judaeus

Binomial name
- Israzorides judaeus Levy, 2003

Genus of spiders

Israzorides is a genus of spiders in the family Miturgidae. It was first described in 2003 by Levy. As of 2017, it contains only one species, Israzorides judaeus, from Israel.
