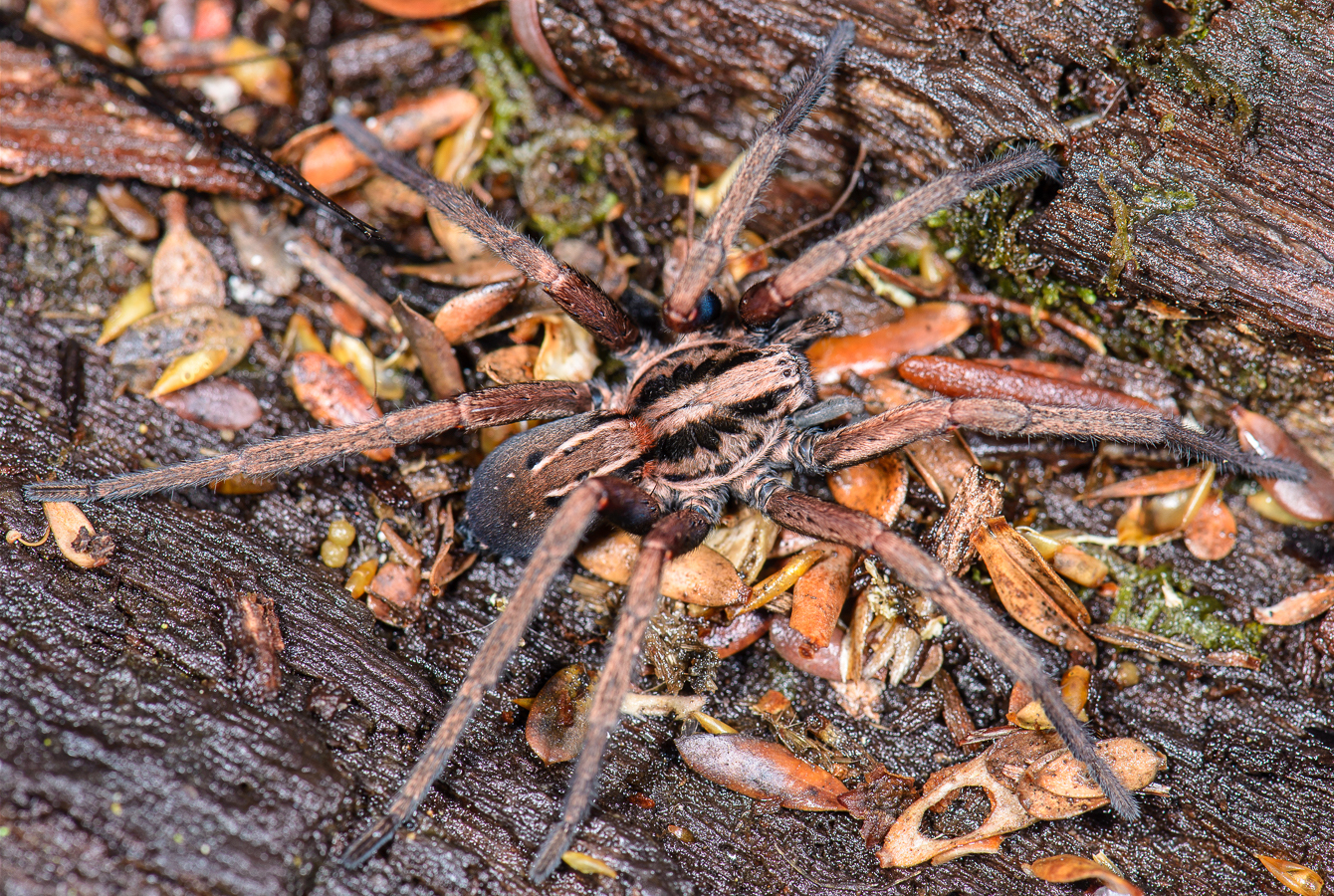
- Miturga albopunctata

Scientific classification
- Kingdom: Animalia
- Phylum: Arthropoda
- Subphylum: Chelicerata
- Class: Arachnida
- Order: Araneae
- Infraorder: Araneomorphae
- Family: Miturgidae
- Genus: Miturga; Thorell

Type species
- Miturga lineata

Species
- 15, see text

= Miturga =

Genus of spiders

Miturga is a genus of spiders in the family Miturgidae. It was first described in 1870 by Thorell. As of 2024, it contains 15 species, all from Australia.

== Species ==
Miturga comprises the following species:

- Miturga agelenina Simon, 1909
- Miturga albopunctata Hickman, 1930
- Miturga annulipes (Lucas, 1844)
- Miturga australiensis (L. Koch, 1873)
- Miturga catograpta Simon, 1909
- Miturga fagei Kolosváry, 1934
- Miturga ferina Simon, 1909
- Miturga gilva L. Koch, 1872
- Miturga impedita Simon, 1909
- Miturga lineata Thorell, 1870
- Miturga necator (Walckenaer, 1837)
- Miturga occidentalis Simon, 1909
- Miturga parva Hogg, 1914
- Miturga severa Simon, 1909
- Miturga thorelli Simon, 1909
