= Tuxoctenus =

Scientific classification
- Domain: Eukaryota
- Kingdom: Animalia
- Phylum: Arthropoda
- Subphylum: Chelicerata
- Class: Arachnida
- Order: Araneae
- Infraorder: Araneomorphae
- Family: Miturgidae
- Genus: Tuxoctenus; Raven

Species
- Tuxoctenus gloverae Raven, 2008; Tuxoctenus linnaei Raven, 2008; Tuxoctenus mcdonaldae Raven, 2008

Genus of spiders

Tuxoctenus is a genus of spiders in the family Miturgidae. It was first described in 2008 by Raven. As of 2016, it contains 3 Australian species.
