= Diaprograpta =

Scientific classification
- Kingdom: Animalia
- Phylum: Arthropoda
- Subphylum: Chelicerata
- Class: Arachnida
- Order: Araneae
- Infraorder: Araneomorphae
- Family: Miturgidae
- Genus: Diaprograpta; Simon

Species
- Diaprograpta abrahamsae Raven, 2009; Diaprograpta alfredgodfreyi Raven, 2009; Diaprograpta hirsti Raven, 2009; Diaprograpta peterandrewsi Raven, 2009; Diaprograpta striola Simon, 1909

Genus of spiders

Diaprograpta is a genus of spiders in the family Miturgidae. It was first described in 1909 by Simon. As of 2016, it contains 5 species from different areas of Australia.
