= Pseudoceto =

Scientific classification
- Domain: Eukaryota
- Kingdom: Animalia
- Phylum: Arthropoda
- Subphylum: Chelicerata
- Class: Arachnida
- Order: Araneae
- Infraorder: Araneomorphae
- Family: Miturgidae
- Genus: Pseudoceto; Mello-Leitão, 1929
- Species: P. pickeli

Binomial name
- Pseudoceto pickeli Mello-Leitão, 1929

Genus of spiders

Pseudoceto is a monotypic genus of South American long-legged sac spiders containing the single species, Pseudoceto pickeli. It was first described by Cândido Firmino de Mello-Leitão in 1929, and has only been found in Brazil. Originally placed with the Corinnidae, it was moved to the Miturgidae in 2014.
