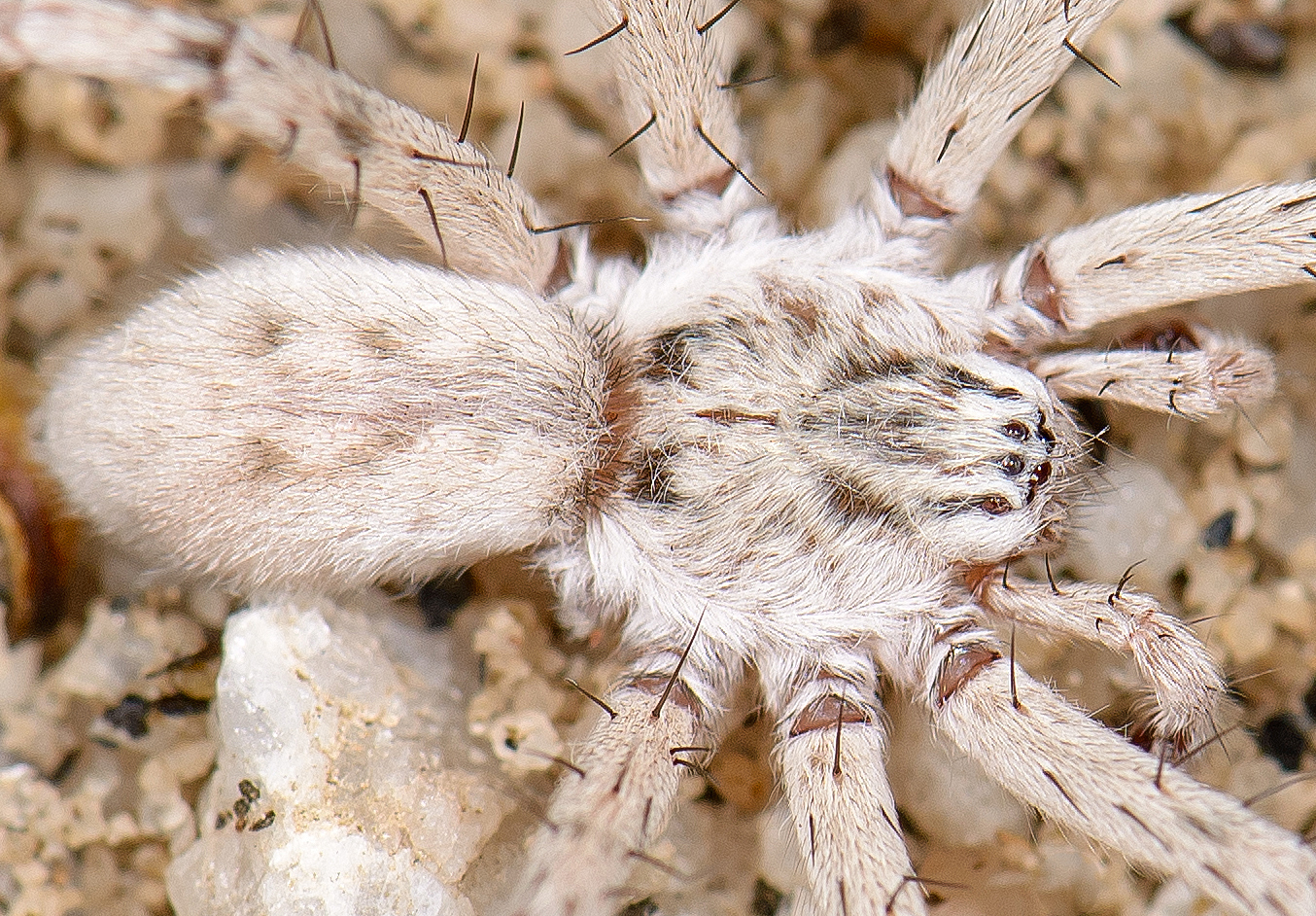

Scientific classification
- Kingdom: Animalia
- Phylum: Arthropoda
- Subphylum: Chelicerata
- Class: Arachnida
- Order: Araneae
- Infraorder: Araneomorphae
- Family: Miturgidae
- Genus: Syspira; Simon

Type species
- Syspira tigrina

Species
- 6, see text

= Syspira =

Genus of spiders

Syspira is a genus of spiders in the family Miturgidae. It was first described in 1895 by Simon. As of 2022, it contains 15 species found in the U.S.A, Mexico, and Caribbean.

== Species ==
As of 2017 Syspira comprises the following species:

- Syspira analytica Chamberlin, 1924
- Syspira eclectica Chamberlin, 1924
- Syspira longipes Simon, 1895
- Syspira pallida Banks, 1904
- Syspira synthetica Chamberlin, 1924
- Syspira tigrina Simon, 1895
