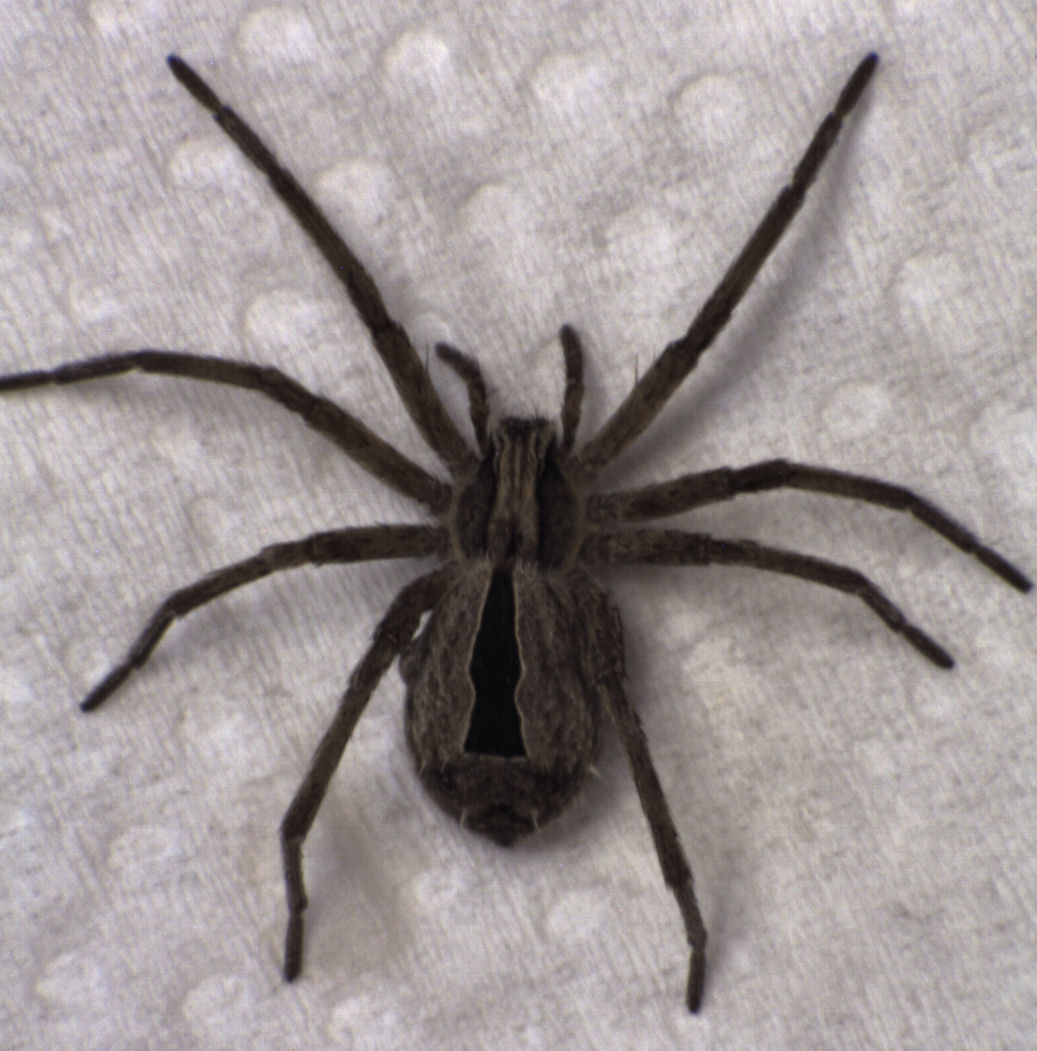
- Argoctenus sp. female
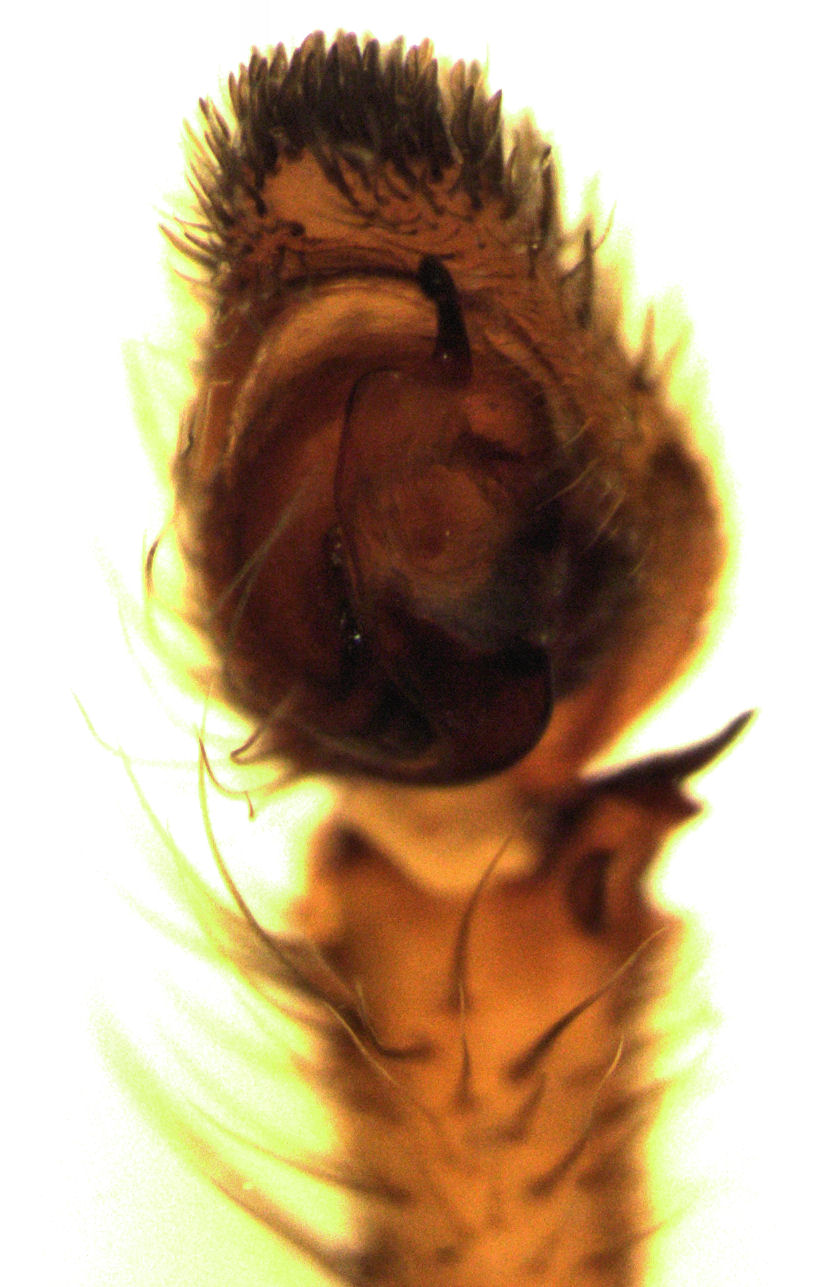
- Argoctenus (male palp)

Scientific classification
- Domain: Eukaryota
- Kingdom: Animalia
- Phylum: Arthropoda
- Subphylum: Chelicerata
- Class: Arachnida
- Order: Araneae
- Infraorder: Araneomorphae
- Family: Miturgidae
- Genus: Argoctenus; L. Koch, 1878

Type species
- A. igneus L. Koch, 1878

Species
- 12, see text

= Argoctenus =

Genus of spiders

Argoctenus is a genus of South Pacific long-legged sac spiders first described by Ludwig Carl Christian Koch in 1878. They are found in Australia, New Zealand, and New Guinea. They resemble wolf spiders except for the narrowed carapace and the eye arrangement.

== Species ==
As of April 2019 it contains twelve species:

- Argoctenus aureus (Hogg, 1911) — New Zealand
- Argoctenus australianus (Karsch, 1878) — Australia (New South Wales)
- Argoctenus bidentatus (Main, 1954) — Australia (Western Australia)
- Argoctenus devisi Rainbow, 1898 — New Guinea
- Argoctenus gracilis (Hickman, 1950) — Australia (South Australia)
- Argoctenus hystriculus Simon, 1909 — Australia (Western Australia)
- Argoctenus igneus L. Koch, 1878 — Australia (Western Australia)
- Argoctenus nebulosus Simon, 1909 — Australia (Western Australia)
- Argoctenus pectinatus Hogg, 1900 — Australia (Victoria)
- Argoctenus pictus L. Koch, 1878 — Australia
- Argoctenus vittatus (Simon, 1889) — Australia, New Caledonia
- Argoctenus vittatus (Rainbow, 1920) — Australia (Lord Howe Is.)
