= Prochora =

Scientific classification
- Kingdom: Animalia
- Phylum: Arthropoda
- Subphylum: Chelicerata
- Class: Arachnida
- Order: Araneae
- Infraorder: Araneomorphae
- Family: Miturgidae
- Genus: Prochora; Simon

Species
- Prochora lycosiformis (O. Pickard-Cambridge, 1872); Prochora praticola (Bösenberg & Strand, 1906)

Genus of spiders

Prochora is a genus of spiders in the family Miturgidae. It was first described in 1886 by Simon. As of 2016, it contains 2 species.
