= Systaria =

Scientific classification
- Kingdom: Animalia
- Phylum: Arthropoda
- Subphylum: Chelicerata
- Class: Arachnida
- Order: Araneae
- Infraorder: Araneomorphae
- Family: Miturgidae
- Genus: Systaria; Simon

Type species
- Systaria drassiformis

Species
- See text.

Genus of spiders

Systaria is a genus of spiders in the family Miturgidae. It was first described in 1897 by Simon. As of 2018, it contains 26 species.

== Species ==
As of November 2018, the World Spider Catalog accepted the following extant species:

- Systaria acuminata Dankittipakul & Singtripop, 2011 – Thailand, Indonesia
- Systaria barkudensis (Gravely, 1931) – India
- Systaria bifida Dankittipakul & Singtripop, 2011 – Thailand. Myanmar
- Systaria bifidops Jäger, 2018 – Malaysia (Peninsula)
- Systaria bohorokensis Deeleman-Reinhold, 2001 – Indonesia (Sumatra)
- Systaria bregibec Jäger, 2018 – Cambodia
- Systaria cervina (Simon, 1897) – Philippines
- Systaria decidua Dankittipakul & Singtripop, 2011 – Thailand
- Systaria deelemanae Dankittipakul & Singtripop, 2011 – Philippines
- Systaria dentata Deeleman-Reinhold, 2001 – Indonesia (Sumatra)
- Systaria drassiformis Simon, 1897 (type species) – Indonesia (Java)
- Systaria elberti (Strand, 1913) – Indonesia (Lombok)
- Systaria gedensis Simon, 1897 – Indonesia (Java)
- Systaria hainanensis Zhang, Fu & Zhu, 2009 – China
- Systaria insolita Dankittipakul & Singtripop, 2011 – Thailand
- Systaria insulana (Rainbow, 1902) – Vanuatu
- Systaria lanna Dankittipakul & Singtripop, 2011 – Thailand
- Systaria lannops Jäger, 2018 – Thailand
- Systaria leoi (Barrion & Litsinger, 1995) – Philippines
- Systaria longinqua Jäger, 2018 – Laos
- Systaria luangprabang Jäger, 2018 – Laos
- Systaria mengla (Song & Zhu, 1994) – China
- Systaria panay Jäger, 2018 – Philippines (Panay)
- Systaria princesa Jäger, 2018 – Philippines (Palawan)
- Systaria procera Jäger, 2018 – Cambodia
- Systaria scapigera Dankittipakul & Singtripop, 2011 – New Guinea
