= Syrisca =

Scientific classification
- Kingdom: Animalia
- Phylum: Arthropoda
- Subphylum: Chelicerata
- Class: Arachnida
- Order: Araneae
- Infraorder: Araneomorphae
- Family: Miturgidae
- Genus: Syrisca; Simon

Type species
- Syrisca pictilis

Species
- 9, see text

Genus of spiders

Syrisca is a genus of spiders in the family Miturgidae. It was first described in 1886 by Simon. As of 2017, it contains 9 species.

== Species ==
Syrisca comprises the following species:

- Syrisca albopilosa Mello-Leitão, 1941
- Syrisca arabs Simon, 1906
- Syrisca drassiformis Strand, 1906
- Syrisca longicaudata Lessert, 1929
- Syrisca mamillata Caporiacco, 1941
- Syrisca patagonica (Boeris, 1889)
- Syrisca pictilis Simon, 1886
- Syrisca russula Simon, 1886
- Syrisca senegalensis (Walckenaer, 1841)
