= Bounty Islands =

Island group in New Zealand

Moutere Hauriri (Māori)
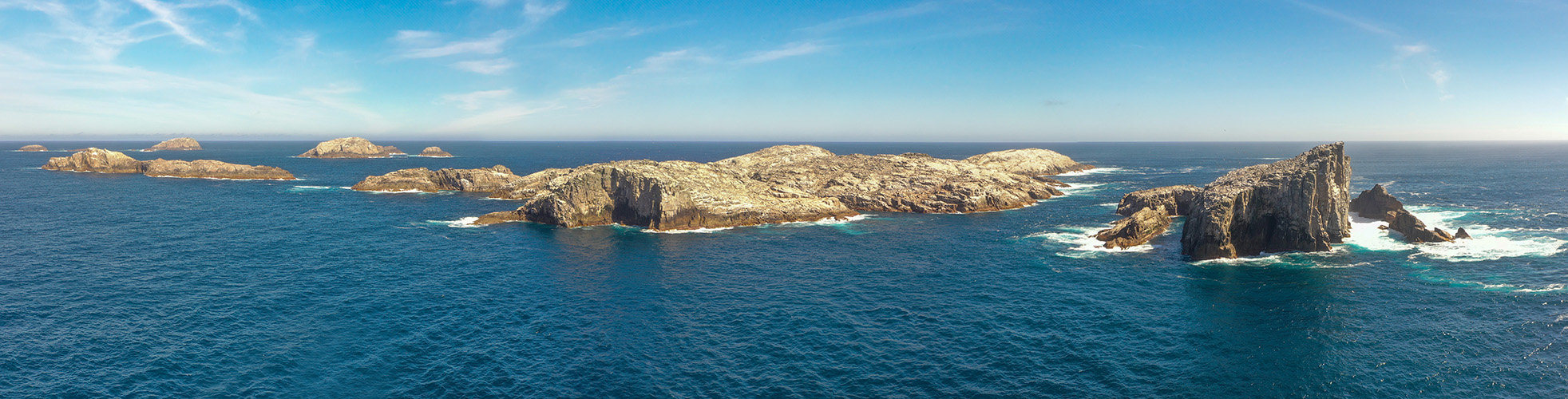
- Panorama of the entire Bounty Islands archipelago, January 2024

- Map of the Bounty Islands

- Location of the Bounty Islands within the Pacific Ocean

Geography
- Coordinates: 47°45′S 179°03′E
- Area: 1 (Note: The Department of Conservation (New Zealand) gives a "total land mass" of 1.35 km^{2} while Land Information New Zealand gives both 1.35 km^{2} or 0.5 km^{2} depending on the dataset.) km^{2} (0.39 sq mi)
- Highest elevation: 73 m (240 ft)

Administration
- New Zealand

Demographics
- Population: 0

The Bounty Islands (Māori: Moutere Hauriri; "Island of angry wind") are a small group of uninhabited granite islets and numerous rocks, with a combined area of around 50 ha (120 acres) in the South Pacific Ocean. Territorially part of New Zealand, they lie about 670 km (420 mi) east-south-east of New Zealand's South Island, 530 km (330 mi) south-west of the Chatham Islands, and 215 km (134 mi) north of the Antipodes Islands. The group is a World Heritage Site.

The islands are listed with the New Zealand Outlying Islands. The islands are an immediate part of New Zealand, but not part of any region or district. Rather, they are listed as an Area Outside Territorial Authority, similar to all other outlying islands except for the Solander Islands.

== History ==
Unlike the Auckland Islands to the west, no concrete archaeological evidence has been found of pre-European settlement on the Bounty Islands, although it is possible they were visited. The islands' remoteness, lack of tree cover and severe climate mitigated against this. There is a lack of natural fresh water in most of the archipelago, and the islands are frequently inundated by storms with seawater making agriculture impossible.

Captain William Bligh discovered the Bounty Islands en route from Spithead to Tahiti in 1788, and named them after his ship HMS Bounty, just months before the famous mutiny. The location of the islands were only roughly marked on charts. In early 1866 Commander W. H. Norman of HMVS Victoria was tasked with determining more accurately their position. He reported them as being latitude 47°50' South and longitude 179°00' East. Captain George Palmer, during the search for the Matoaka, placed the islands at 47°46'24" South 178°56'45" East. Palmer also annexed the islands for New Zealand.

During the 19th century the area was a popular hunting-ground for sealers. The islands were also searched from time to time for missing ships and crews, including those from the General Grant and the Matoaka.

The Hinemoa visited the islands in March 1886 and erected a depot for marooned sailors on the largest island. Captain Fairchild noted that there was no fresh water available on these islands. The depot had been destroyed by the sea by the time the Stella visited the island in 1887. A new Admiralty chart 1022 was issued for the area in 1888, which took into account survey work undertaken by the Hinemoa.

In November 1891 the Hinemoa returned to the islands and built a fresh provisions storage.

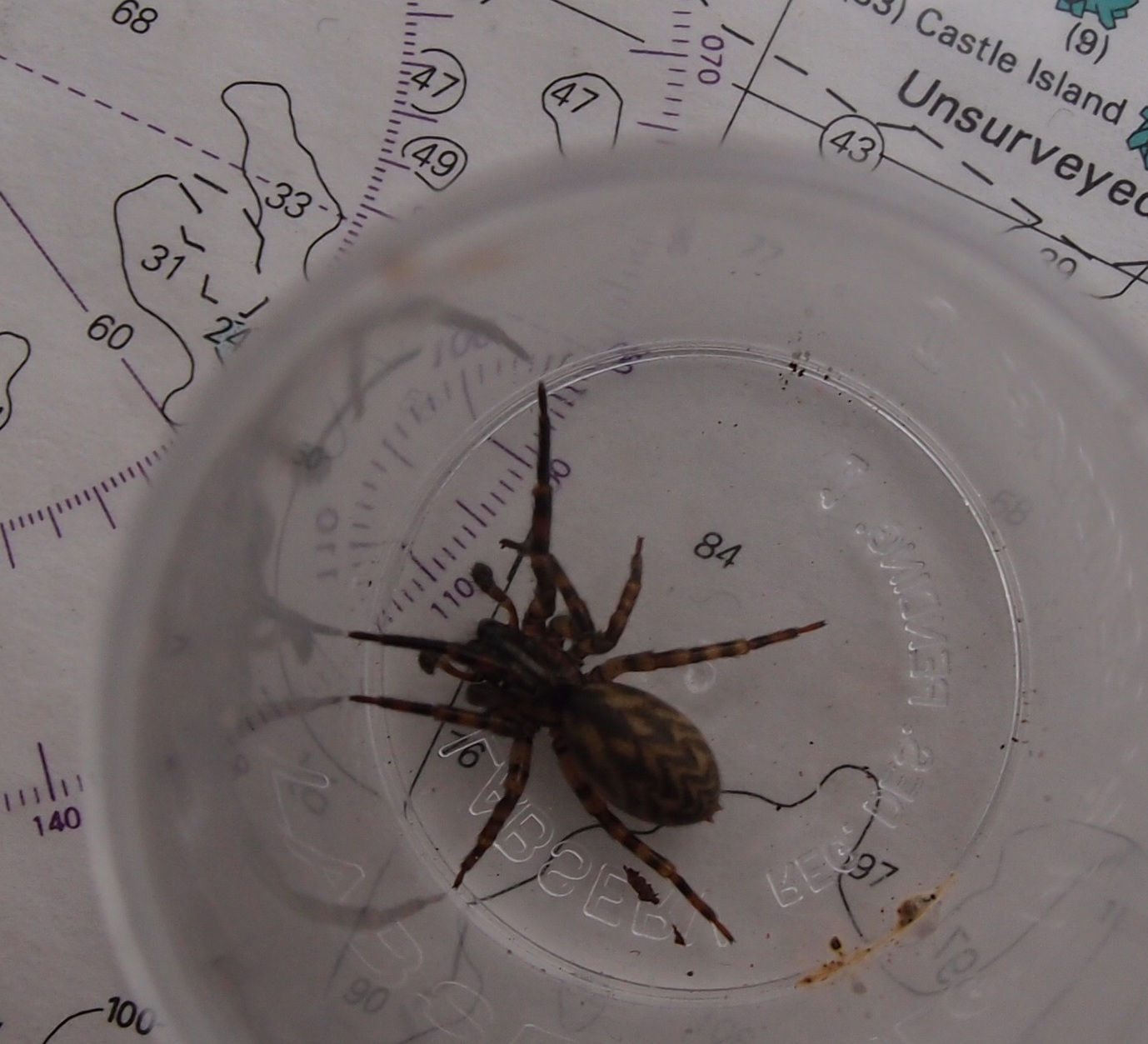
Pacificana cockayni spider from Proclamation Island (subadult male)

== Flora and fauna ==
Ecologically, the islands are part of the Antipodes Subantarctic Islands tundra ecoregion. Plants include Cook's scurvy grass. The group is home to an endemic spider Pacificana cockayni, endemic insects, and large numbers of seabirds.

=== Important Bird Area ===
The Bounty group has been identified as an Important Bird Area (IBA) by BirdLife International because of its significance as a breeding site for erect-crested penguins, Salvin's albatrosses and Bounty shags.

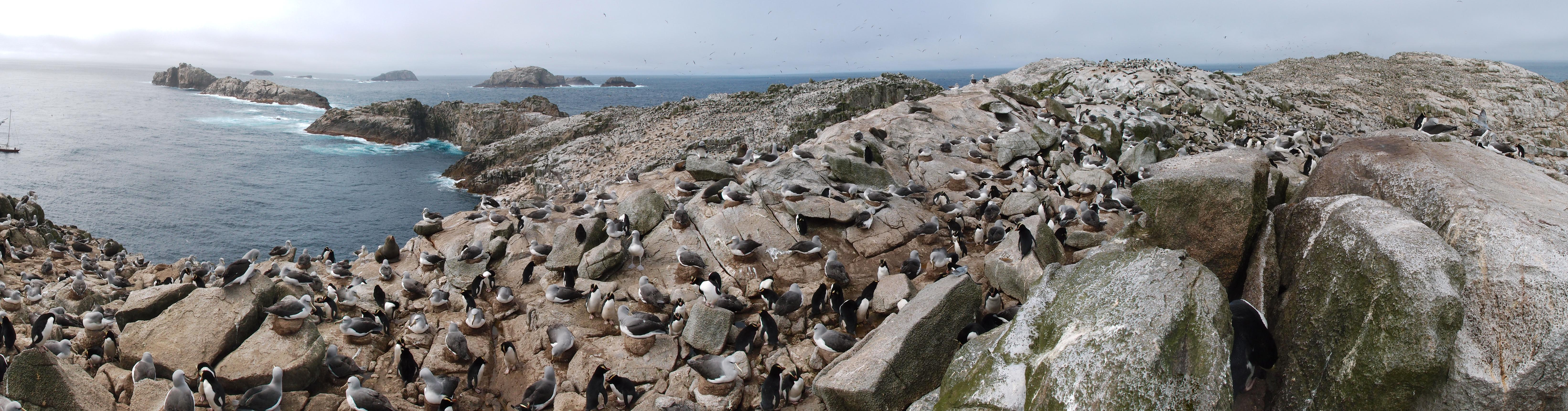
Mixed colony of Salvin's albatross and erect-crested penguins on Proclamation Island. Note also a fulmar prion on a rock near the center of the image.

== Geography ==
There are 13 granite islands that make up the Bounty Island group. The whole chain is only 5 km (3.1 mi) across at its longest axis, and comprises three subgroups: the Main Group, the Centre Group, and the East Group. The total area is only 1.35 km^{2} (0.52 sq mi).

The Main Group is the largest of the three groups, and is located in the northwest of the chain. It includes the group's largest island, Depot Island, which is around 700 metres in length and 400 metres across at its widest point. Proclamation and Tunnel Islands are separated from Depot Island by only a narrow cleft, and are joined to it at low tide. A small islet off the north coast of this group's Spider Island is the chain's northernmost point; the westernmost point is the western tip of Penguin Island.

The Centre Group is located some 1.5 to 2 kilometres to the southeast of the Main Group, and contains three main islands, arrayed in a north–south line. A smaller islet lies immediately to the west. The northernmost of the Centre Group, Funnel Island, contains the chain's highest point, at 73 m (240 ft) above sea level.

A further 1.5 kilometres to the east is the East Group, which is also arrayed roughly in a north–south line. The largest island in this group, Molly Cap, is the group's southernmost island, and contains the chain's second-highest point, 70 m (230 ft) above sea level. This group contains two large islets and one small islet, along with several reefs and stacks, one of which is the easternmost point in the chain.

The islands are at the antipodes of Bouillé-Ménard, in France (Pays de la Loire).

=== Islands ===
The following table includes named islands according to Land Information New Zealand.

Location	Area (ha)	Group
Depot Island	13.0	Main
Ruatara Island	5.5	Main
Penguin Island	5.1	Main
Lion Island	4.8	Main
Spider Island	4.7	Main
Proclamation Island	3.4	Main
Tunnel Island	1.7	Main
Ranfurly Island	1.4	Main
Skua Rock	0.7	Main
Seal Rock	0.5	Main
unnamed	0.2	Main
Dog Rock	0.2	Main
Main Group	41.2	Main
Funnel Island	2.7	Centre
Prion Island	1.2	Centre
Castle Island	0.7	Centre
Coronet Island	0.3	Centre
Centre Group	5.0	Centre
Molly Cap	2.4	East
North Rock	0.9	East
Con Island	0.4	East
East Group	3.9	East
Total	50.2	

== See also ==
- List of Antarctic and subantarctic islands
- List of islands of New Zealand
- List of islands
- New Zealand subantarctic islands
- Water hemisphere
- Bounty Islands nonmarine fauna
- Campbell Plateau
- Desert island
