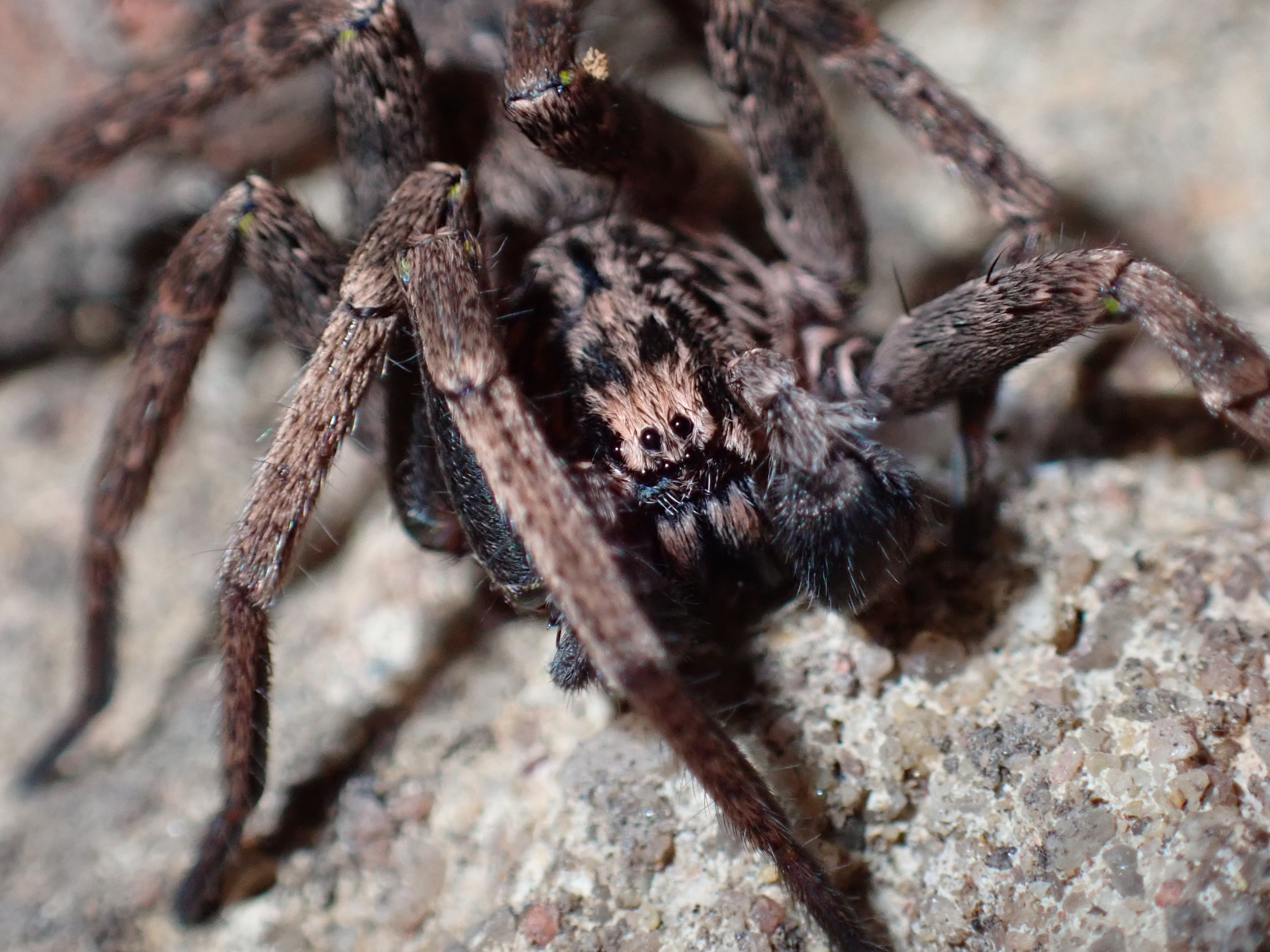

Scientific classification
- Domain: Eukaryota
- Kingdom: Animalia
- Phylum: Arthropoda
- Subphylum: Chelicerata
- Class: Arachnida
- Order: Araneae
- Infraorder: Araneomorphae
- Family: Miturgidae
- Genus: Mituliodon
- Species: M. tarantulinus

Binomial name
- Mituliodon tarantulinus (L. Koch, 1873)

= Mituliodon =

Genus of spiders

Mituliodon is a genus of spiders in the family Miturgidae. It was first described in 2003 by Raven & Stumkat. As of 2017, it contains only one species, Mituliodon tarantulinus, found in Timor and Australia.
