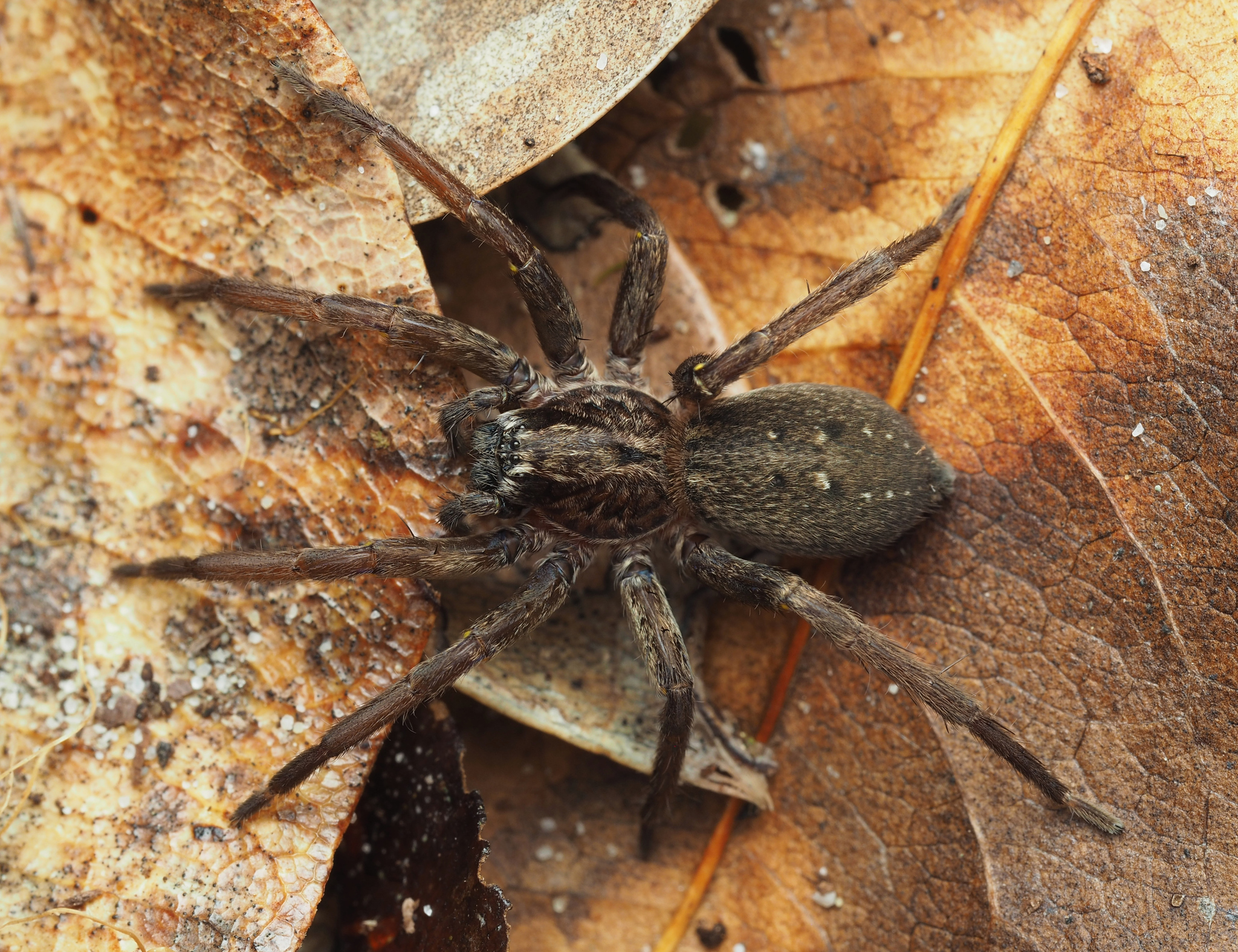
- Mituliodon tarantulinus
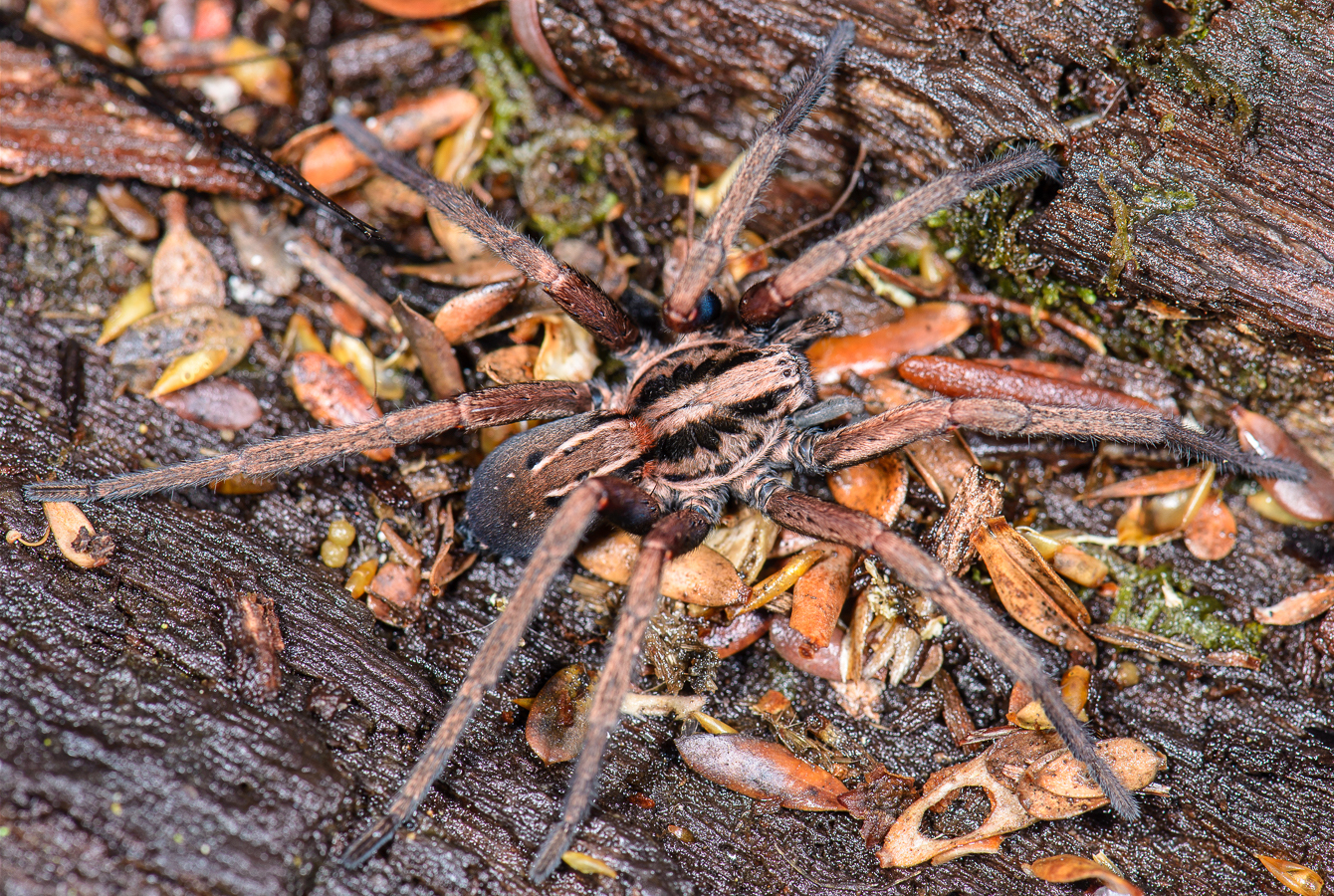
- male Miturga albopunctata

Scientific classification
- Kingdom: Animalia
- Phylum: Arthropoda
- Subphylum: Chelicerata
- Class: Arachnida
- Order: Araneae
- Infraorder: Araneomorphae
- Family: Miturgidae; Simon, 1886

Diversity
- 33 genera, 193 species
- blue: reported countries (WSC) green: observation hotspots (iNaturalist)

Synonyms
- Zoridae F. O. Pickard-Cambridge, 1893

= Miturgidae =

Long-legged sac spiders Temporal range: Palaeogene–present

Family of spiders

Miturgidae is a family of araneomorph spiders that includes about 200 species in 33 genera worldwide.

First described by Eugène Simon in 1886, it has been substantially revised, and includes the previous family Zoridae as a synonym, and excludes the family Xenoctenidae. Several genera have also been removed, such as the large genus Cheiracanthium, which was transferred to the Cheiracanthiidae.

== Description ==
Spiders of the Miturgidae family are small-to-medium sized spiders, with most genera possessing a brown and gray band pattern on the spider's body.

== Behavior ==
Miturgidae spiders are nocturnal. They live on the ground or on foliage, where they build a sac-like shelter on vegetation or under rocks or other debris. Mother spiders will deposit and protect her eggs in these shelters.

== Genera ==
As of January 2026, this family includes 33 genera and 193 species:

- Argoctenus L. Koch, 1878 – Australia, New Caledonia, New Guinea, New Zealand
- Coryssiphus Simon, 1903 – South Africa
- Diaprograpta Simon, 1909 – Australia
- Elassoctenus Simon, 1909 – Australia
- Eupograpta Raven, 2009 – Australia
- Hestimodema Simon, 1909 – Australia
- Israzorides Levy, 2003 – Israel
- Knotodo Raven, 2023 – Australia
- Mituliodon Raven & Stumkat, 2003 – Australia, Timor
- Miturga Thorell, 1870 – Australia
- Miturgiella Raven, 2023 – Australia
- Miturgopelma Raven, 2023 – Australia
- Mitzoruga Raven, 2009 – Australia
- Nuliodon Raven, 2009 – Australia
- Odomasta Simon, 1909 – Australia
- Palicanus Thorell, 1897 – Réunion, Seychelles, China, Indonesia, Myanmar, India
- Parapostenus Lessert, 1923 – Lesotho, South Africa
- Prochora Simon, 1886 – Algeria, Asia, Italy
- Pseudoceto Mello-Leitão, 1929 – Brazil
- Septsigilla H. B. Zhang & F. Zhang, 2025 – China
- Simonus Ritsema, 1881 – Australia
- Syrisca Simon, 1886 – DR Congo, Ethiopia, Sudan, Senegal, Argentina, Colombia
- Syspira Simon, 1895 – Dominican Rep, Mexico, United States
- Systaria Simon, 1897 – Asia, Vanuatu
- Tamin Deeleman-Reinhold, 2001 – Indonesia, Malaysia, Borneo
- Teminius Keyserling, 1887 – Mexico, United States, Argentina, Paraguay, Greater Antilles to Argentina
- Thasyraea L. Koch, 1878 – Australia
- Tuxoctenus Raven, 2008 – Australia
- Xantharia Deeleman-Reinhold, 2001 – China, Indonesia, Malaysia, Vietnam
- Xeromiturga Raven, 2023 – Australia
- Xistera Raven, 2023 – Australia
- Zealoctenus Forster & Wilton, 1973 – New Zealand
- Zora C. L. Koch, 1847 – Algeria, Asia, Europe, North America
