= List of Zoropsidae species =

This page lists all described species of the spider family Zoropsidae accepted by the World Spider Catalog as of February 2021:

== A ==
=== Akamasia ===
Akamasia Bosselaers, 2002

- A. cyprogenia (Bosselaers, 1997) (type) — Cyprus

=== Anachemmis ===
Anachemmis Chamberlin, 1919

- A. aalbui Platnick & Ubick, 2005 — USA
- A. beattyi Platnick & Ubick, 2005 — USA, Mexico
- A. jungi Platnick & Ubick, 2005 — USA
- A. linsdalei Platnick & Ubick, 2005 — USA
- A. sober Chamberlin, 1919 (type) — USA

=== Austrotengella ===
Austrotengella Raven, 2012

- A. hackerae Raven, 2012 — Australia (Queensland)
- A. hebronae Raven, 2012 — Australia (New South Wales)
- A. monteithi Raven, 2012 — Australia (Queensland)
- A. plimeri Raven, 2012 — Australia (New South Wales)
- A. toddae Raven, 2012 (type) — Australia (Queensland, New South Wales)
- A. wrighti Raven, 2012 — Australia (Queensland, New South Wales)

== B ==
=== Birrana ===
Birrana Raven & Stumkat, 2005

- B. bulburin Raven & Stumkat, 2005 (type) — Australia (Queensland)

== C ==
=== Cauquenia ===
Cauquenia Piacentini, Ramírez & Silva, 2013

- C. maule Piacentini, Ramírez & Silva, 2013 (type) — Chile

=== Chinja ===
Chinja Polotow & Griswold, 2018

- C. chinja Polotow & Griswold, 2018 (type) — Tanzania
- C. scharffi Polotow & Griswold, 2018 — Tanzania

=== Ciniflella ===
Ciniflella Mello-Leitão, 1921

- C. lutea Mello-Leitão, 1921 (type) — Brazil

=== † Cymbioropsis ===
† Cymbioropsis Wunderlich, 2017 - Tengellinae

== D ==
=== Devendra ===
Devendra Lehtinen, 1967

- D. amaiti Polotow & Griswold, 2017 — Sri Lanka
- D. pardalis (Simon, 1898) (type) — Sri Lanka
- D. pumilus (Simon, 1898) — Sri Lanka
- D. saama Polotow & Griswold, 2017 — Sri Lanka
- D. seriatus (Simon, 1898) — Sri Lanka

== E ==
=== † Eomatachia ===
† Eomatachia Petrunkevitch, 1942 - Tengellinae

=== † Eoprychia ===
† Eoprychia Petrunkevitch, 1958

- † E. clara Wunderlich, 2017 — Palaeogene Baltic amber
- † E. succini Petrunkevitch, 1958 — Palaeogene Baltic amber
- † E. succinopsis Wunderlich, 2004 — Palaeogene Baltic amber
- † E. vicina Wunderlich, 2004 — Palaeogene Baltic amber

== G ==
=== Griswoldia ===
Griswoldia Dippenaar-Schoeman & Jocqué, 1997

- G. acaenata (Griswold, 1991) — South Africa
- G. disparilis (Lawrence, 1952) — South Africa
- G. leleupi (Griswold, 1991) — South Africa
- G. meikleae (Griswold, 1991) — South Africa
- G. melana (Lawrence, 1938) — South Africa
- G. natalensis (Lawrence, 1938) — South Africa
- G. punctata (Lawrence, 1942) — South Africa
- G. robusta (Simon, 1898) (type) — South Africa
- G. sibyna (Griswold, 1991) — South Africa
- G. transversa (Griswold, 1991) — South Africa
- G. urbensis (Lawrence, 1942) — South Africa
- G. zuluensis (Lawrence, 1938) — South Africa

== H ==
=== Hoedillus ===
Hoedillus Simon, 1898

- H. sexpunctatus Simon, 1898 (type) — Guatemala, Nicaragua

=== Huntia ===
Huntia Gray & Thompson, 2001

- H. deepensis Gray & Thompson, 2001 (type) — Australia (Western Australia)
- H. murrindal Gray & Thompson, 2001 — Australia (Victoria)

== I ==
=== Itatiaya ===
Itatiaya Mello-Leitão, 1915

- I. apipema Polotow & Brescovit, 2006 — Brazil
- I. iuba Polotow & Brescovit, 2006 — Brazil
- I. modesta Mello-Leitão, 1915 (type) — Brazil
- I. pucupucu Polotow & Brescovit, 2006 — Brazil
- I. pykyyra Polotow & Brescovit, 2006 — Brazil
- I. tacamby Polotow & Brescovit, 2006 — Brazil
- I. tubixaba Polotow & Brescovit, 2006 — Brazil
- I. ywyty Polotow & Brescovit, 2006 — Brazil

== K ==
=== Kilyana ===
Kilyana Raven & Stumkat, 2005

- K. bicarinatus Raven & Stumkat, 2005 — Australia (Queensland)
- K. campbelli Raven & Stumkat, 2005 — Australia (New South Wales)
- K. corbeni Raven & Stumkat, 2005 — Australia (Queensland)
- K. dougcooki Raven & Stumkat, 2005 — Australia (Queensland)
- K. eungella Raven & Stumkat, 2005 — Australia (Queensland)
- K. hendersoni Raven & Stumkat, 2005 (type) — Australia (Queensland)
- K. ingrami Raven & Stumkat, 2005 — Australia (Queensland)
- K. kroombit Raven & Stumkat, 2005 — Australia (Queensland)
- K. lorne Raven & Stumkat, 2005 — Australia (New South Wales)
- K. obrieni Raven & Stumkat, 2005 — Australia (Queensland)

=== Krukt ===
Krukt Raven & Stumkat, 2005

- K. cannoni Raven & Stumkat, 2005 — Australia (Queensland)
- K. ebbenielseni Raven & Stumkat, 2005 — Australia (Queensland)
- K. megma Raven & Stumkat, 2005 — Australia (Queensland)
- K. piligyna Raven & Stumkat, 2005 (type) — Australia (Queensland)
- K. vicoopsae Raven & Stumkat, 2005 — Australia (Queensland)

== L ==
=== Lauricius ===
Lauricius Simon, 1888

- L. hemicloeinus Simon, 1888 (type) — Mexico
- L. hooki Gertsch, 1941 — USA

=== Liocranoides ===
Liocranoides Keyserling, 1881

- L. archeri Platnick, 1999 — USA
- L. coylei Platnick, 1999 — USA
- L. gertschi Platnick, 1999 — USA
- L. tennesseensis Platnick, 1999 — USA
- L. unicolor Keyserling, 1881 (type) — USA

== M ==
=== Megateg ===
Megateg Raven & Stumkat, 2005

- M. bartholomai Raven & Stumkat, 2005 — Australia (Queensland)
- M. covacevichae Raven & Stumkat, 2005 — Australia (Queensland)
- M. elegans Raven & Stumkat, 2005 — Australia (Queensland)
- M. gigasep Raven & Stumkat, 2005 — Australia (Queensland)
- M. lesbiae Raven & Stumkat, 2005 — Australia (Queensland)
- M. paulstumkati Raven & Stumkat, 2005 — Australia (Queensland)
- M. ramboldi Raven & Stumkat, 2005 (type) — Australia (Queensland)
- M. spurgeon Raven & Stumkat, 2005 — Australia (Queensland)

== P ==
=== Phanotea ===
Phanotea Simon, 1896

- P. cavata Griswold, 1994 — South Africa
- P. ceratogyna Griswold, 1994 — South Africa
- P. digitata Griswold, 1994 — South Africa
- P. knysna Griswold, 1994 — South Africa
- P. lata Griswold, 1994 — South Africa
- P. latebricola Lawrence, 1952 — South Africa
- P. margarita Griswold, 1994 — South Africa
- P. natalensis Lawrence, 1951 — South Africa
- P. orestria Griswold, 1994 — South Africa
- P. peringueyi Simon, 1896 (type) — South Africa
- P. sathegyna Griswold, 1994 — South Africa
- P. simoni Lawrence, 1951 — South Africa
- P. xhosa Griswold, 1994 — South Africa

=== Pseudoctenus ===
Pseudoctenus Caporiacco, 1949

- P. meneghettii Caporiacco, 1949 (type) — Kenya, Burundi
- P. thaleri Jocqué, 2009 — Malawi

=== † Pseudoeoprychia ===
† Pseudoeoprychia Wunderlich, 2017 - Tengellinae

== S ==
=== Socalchemmis ===
Socalchemmis Platnick & Ubick, 2001

- S. arroyoseco Platnick & Ubick, 2007 — USA
- S. bixleri Platnick & Ubick, 2001 — USA
- S. cajalco Platnick & Ubick, 2001 — USA
- S. catavina Platnick & Ubick, 2001 — Mexico
- S. cruz Platnick & Ubick, 2001 — USA
- S. dolichopus (Chamberlin, 1919) (type) — USA
- S. gertschi Platnick & Ubick, 2001 — USA
- S. icenoglei Platnick & Ubick, 2001 — USA
- S. idyllwild Platnick & Ubick, 2001 — USA
- S. kastoni Platnick & Ubick, 2001 — USA, Mexico
- S. miramar Platnick & Ubick, 2001 — USA
- S. monterey Platnick & Ubick, 2001 — USA
- S. palomar Platnick & Ubick, 2001 — USA
- S. prenticei Platnick & Ubick, 2001 — USA
- S. rothi Platnick & Ubick, 2001 — Mexico
- S. shantzi Platnick & Ubick, 2001 — USA
- S. williamsi Platnick & Ubick, 2001 — Mexico

=== † Succiniropsis ===
† Succiniropsis Wunderlich, 2004 - Tengellinae

== T ==
=== Takeoa ===
Takeoa Lehtinen, 1967

- T. huangshan Tang, Xu & Zhu, 2004 — China
- T. nishimurai (Yaginuma, 1963) (type) — China, Korea, Japan

=== Tengella ===
Tengella Dahl, 1901

- T. albolineata (F. O. Pickard-Cambridge, 1902) — Mexico
- T. kalebi Candia-Ramírez & Valdez-Mondragón, 2014 — Mexico
- T. perfuga Dahl, 1901 (type) — Nicaragua
- T. radiata (Kulczyński, 1909) — Honduras to Panama
- T. thaleri Platnick, 2009 — Mexico

=== Titiotus ===
Titiotus Simon, 1897

- T. californicus Simon, 1897 (type) — USA
- T. costa Platnick & Ubick, 2008 — USA
- T. flavescens (Chamberlin & Ivie, 1941) — USA
- T. fresno Platnick & Ubick, 2008 — USA
- T. gertschi Platnick & Ubick, 2008 — USA
- T. hansii (Schenkel, 1950) — USA
- T. heberti Platnick & Ubick, 2008 — USA
- T. humboldt Platnick & Ubick, 2008 — USA
- T. icenoglei Platnick & Ubick, 2008 — USA
- T. madera Platnick & Ubick, 2008 — USA
- T. marin Platnick & Ubick, 2008 — USA
- T. roadsend Platnick & Ubick, 2008 — USA
- T. shantzi Platnick & Ubick, 2008 — USA
- T. shasta Platnick & Ubick, 2008 — USA
- T. tahoe Platnick & Ubick, 2008 — USA
- T. tulare Platnick & Ubick, 2008 — USA

== U ==
=== Uliodon ===
Uliodon L. Koch, 1873

- U. albopunctatus L. Koch, 1873 (type) — New Zealand
- U. cervinus L. Koch, 1873 — New Zealand
- U. ferrugineus (L. Koch, 1873) — Australia
- U. frenatus (L. Koch, 1873) — New Zealand

== W ==
=== Wiltona ===
Wiltona Koçak & Kemal, 2008

- W. filicicola (Forster & Wilton, 1973) (type) — New Zealand

== Z ==
=== Zorocrates ===
Zorocrates Simon, 1888

- Z. aemulus Gertsch, 1935 — USA, Mexico
- Z. alternatus Gertsch & Davis, 1936 — USA, Mexico
- Z. apulco Platnick & Ubick, 2007 — Mexico
- Z. badius Simon, 1895 — Mexico
- Z. blas Platnick & Ubick, 2007 — Mexico
- Z. bosencheve Platnick & Ubick, 2007 — Mexico
- Z. chamela Platnick & Ubick, 2007 — Mexico
- Z. chamula Platnick & Ubick, 2007 — Mexico
- Z. chiapa Platnick & Ubick, 2007 — Mexico
- Z. colima Platnick & Ubick, 2007 — Mexico
- Z. contreras Platnick & Ubick, 2007 — Mexico
- Z. fuscus Simon, 1888 (type) — Mexico
- Z. gnaphosoides (O. Pickard-Cambridge, 1892) — Mexico to El Salvador
- Z. guerrerensis Gertsch & Davis, 1940 — Mexico, possibly Central America
- Z. huatusco Platnick & Ubick, 2007 — Mexico
- Z. karli Gertsch & Riechert, 1976 — USA, Mexico
- Z. mistus O. Pickard-Cambridge, 1896 — Mexico
- Z. mordax (O. Pickard-Cambridge, 1898) — Mexico
- Z. nochix Platnick & Ubick, 2007 — Mexico
- Z. oaxaca Platnick & Ubick, 2007 — Mexico
- Z. ocampo Platnick & Ubick, 2007 — Mexico
- Z. pictus Simon, 1895 — Mexico
- Z. pie Platnick & Ubick, 2007 — Mexico
- Z. potosi Platnick & Ubick, 2007 — Mexico
- Z. soledad Platnick & Ubick, 2007 — Mexico
- Z. sotano Platnick & Ubick, 2007 — Mexico
- Z. tequila Platnick & Ubick, 2007 — Mexico
- Z. terrell Platnick & Ubick, 2007 — USA, Mexico
- Z. unicolor (Banks, 1901) — USA, Mexico
- Z. xilitla Platnick & Ubick, 2007 — Mexico
- Z. yolo Platnick & Ubick, 2007 — Mexico

=== Zoropsis ===
Zoropsis

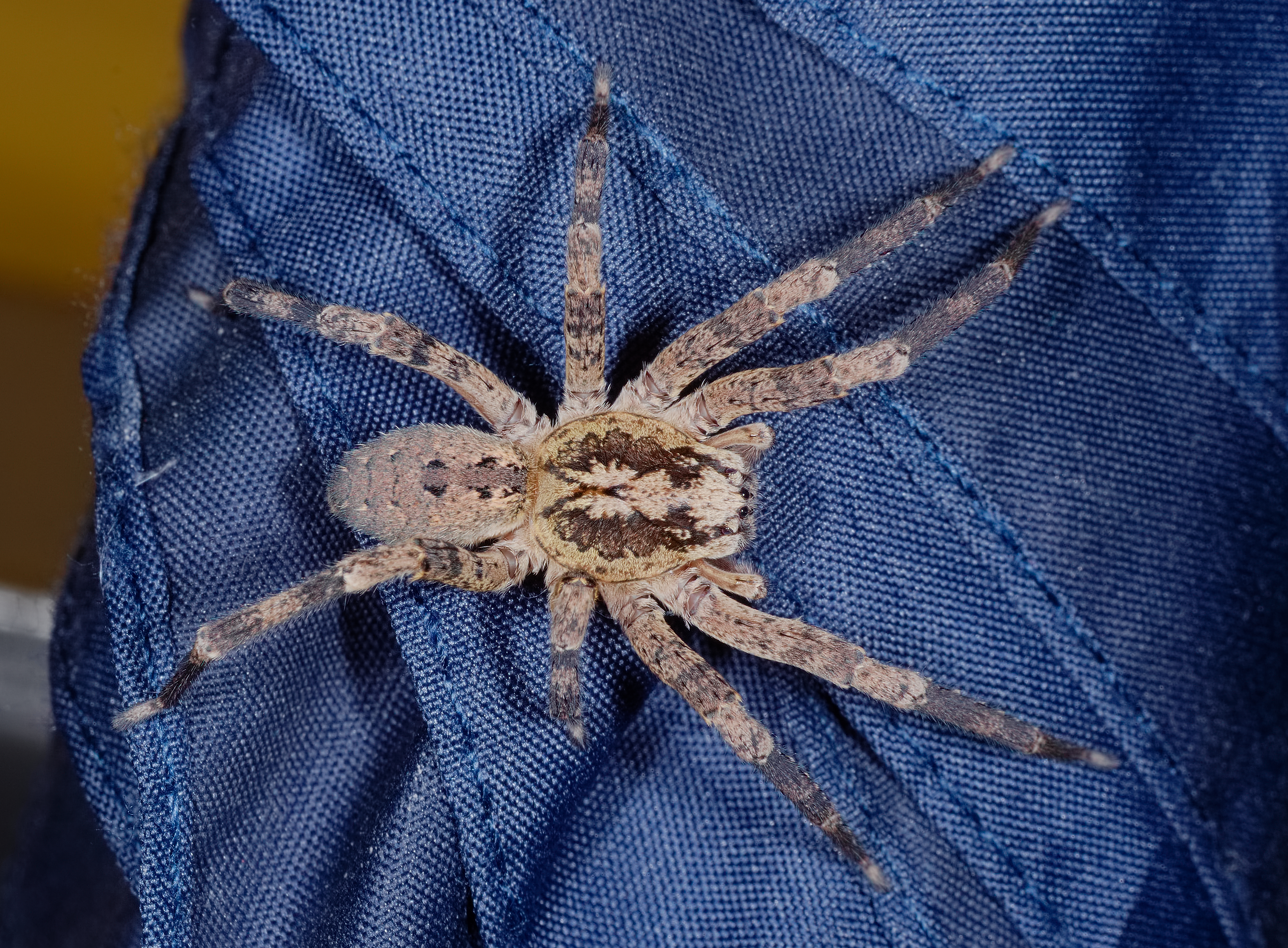
Zoropsis spinimana, female

Zoropsis Simon, 1878

- Z. albertisi Pavesi, 1880 — Tunisia
- Z. beccarii Caporiacco, 1935 — Turkey
- Z. bilineata Dahl, 1901 — Spain (Majorca), Morocco, Algeria
  - Z. b. viberti Simon, 1911 — Algeria
- Z. coreana Paik, 1978 — Korea
- Z. kirghizicus Ovtchinnikov & Zonstein, 2001 — Kyrgyzstan
- Z. longensis L. Y. Wang, B. L. Wang & Zhang, 2020 — China
- Z. lutea (Thorell, 1875) — Croatia, Greece, Bulgaria, Ukraine, Turkey, Syria, Lebanon, Israel, Iran
- Z. markamensis Hu & Li, 1987 — China
- Z. media Simon, 1878 — Western Mediterranean
- Z. oertzeni Dahl, 1901 — Italy, Greece, Balkans, Turkey
- Z. pekingensis Schenkel, 1953 — China
- Z. rufipes (Lucas, 1838) — Canary Is., Madeira
- Z. saba Thaler & van Harten, 2006 — Yemen
- Z. spinimana (Dufour, 1820) (type) — Europe, Turkey, Caucasus, Russia (Europe to Far East), Central Asia, China, Japan. Introduced to USA
- Z. tangi Li, Hu & Zhang, 2015 — China (Inner Mongolia)
- Z. thaleri Levy, 2007 — Turkey, Lebanon, Syria, Israel
