= Tengellidae =

Family of spiders

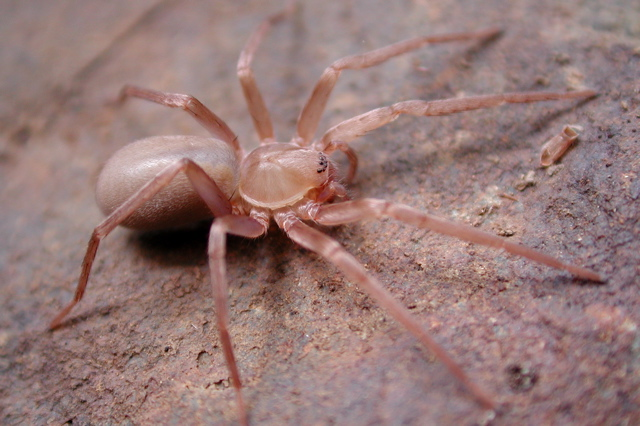
Titiotus sp. from northern California, west of the Great Central Valley.

Tengellidae is a former family of spiders that has been merged into the family Zoropsidae. Genera formerly placed in Tengellidae now in Zoropsidae include:

- Anachemmis Chamberlin, 1919
- Austrotengella Raven, 2012
- Ciniflella Mello-Leitão, 1921
- Lauricius Simon, 1888
- Liocranoides Keyserling, 1881
- Socalchemmis Platnick & Ubick, 2001
- Tengella Dahl, 1901
- Titiotus Simon, 1897
- Wiltona Koçak & Kemal, 2008

== See also ==
- Spider families
