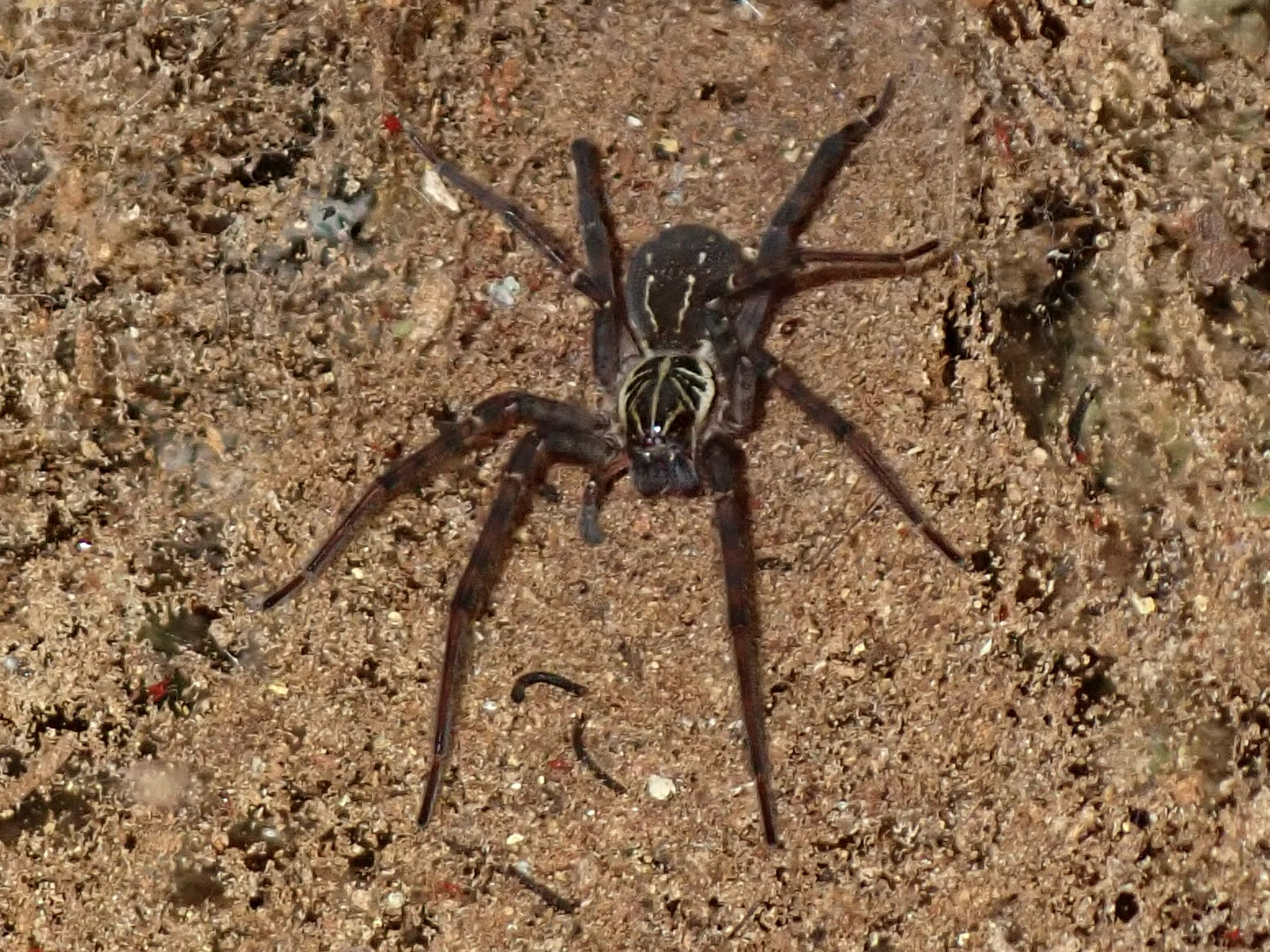
- T radiata from Costa Rica

Scientific classification
- Kingdom: Animalia
- Phylum: Arthropoda
- Subphylum: Chelicerata
- Class: Arachnida
- Order: Araneae
- Infraorder: Araneomorphae
- Family: Zoropsidae
- Genus: Tengella
- Species: T. radiata

Binomial name
- Tengella radiata (Kulczyński, 1909)

Synonyms
- Metafecenia radiata Kulczyński, 1909

= Tengella radiata =

Species of spider

Tengella radiata is a species of spider in the family Zoropsidae (formerly Tengellidae). It is found from Honduras to Panama.

== Taxonomy ==
The species was originally described as Metafecenia radiata by Władysław Kulczyński in 1909 based on a female specimen from Sipurio de Talamanca, Costa Rica. The taxonomic status of the species was later clarified by Wolff (1978), who rejected the synonymy with Tengella perfuga Dahl proposed by Lehtinen (1967), noting distinct differences in color pattern and size.

== Distribution ==
T. radiata has been recorded from Honduras to Panama. Specific locality records include multiple sites in Costa Rica, including Alajuela, Guanacaste, Heredia, and Puntarenas provinces.

== Description ==
Tengella radiata can be distinguished from related species by its distinctive color pattern. The carapace features yellow submarginal lines and a light yellow median line running from between the posterior median eyes to the posterior edge of the cephalothorax. Three pairs of yellow lines radiate from the median groove, all connecting with the submarginal lines. The legs are pale yellow with darker dorsal surfaces on the femora and tibiae, typically showing four annulations on each segment.

The abdomen is darker anteriorly, with two thin white lines running from the anterior edge that break into rows of five dots extending almost to the spinnerets. Adult females have a mean leg length of 34.8mm for leg I, while males are smaller.
