= Socalchemmis dolichopus =

Scientific classification
- Kingdom: Animalia
- Phylum: Arthropoda
- Subphylum: Chelicerata
- Class: Arachnida
- Order: Araneae
- Infraorder: Araneomorphae
- Family: Zoropsidae
- Genus: Socalchemmis
- Species: S. dolichopus

Binomial name
- Socalchemmis dolichopus (Chamberlin, 1919)

Species of spider

Socalchemmis dolichopus is a species of araneomorphae spider of the family Zoropsidae.

== Distribution ==
The species is endemic to California in the United States. It is found in the counties of Los Angeles, Orange, Riverside and San Bernardino.

== Description ==
The male described by Platnick and Ubick in 2001 measured 8.1 millimetres (0.32 in) and the female was 7.5 millimetres (0.30 in).

== Original publication ==
- Chamberlin, 1919 : New Californian spiders. Journal of Entomology and Zoology, Claremont, vol. 12, p. 1-17.
