= Titiotus flavescens =

Scientific classification
- Kingdom: Animalia
- Phylum: Arthropoda
- Subphylum: Chelicerata
- Class: Arachnida
- Order: Araneae
- Infraorder: Araneomorphae
- Family: Zoropsidae
- Genus: Titiotus
- Species: T. flavescens

Binomial name
- Titiotus flavescens (Chamberlin & Ivie, 1941)

Species of spider

Titiotus flavescens is a species of false wolf spiders & wandering spiders in the family Zoropsidae. It is found in the United States.
