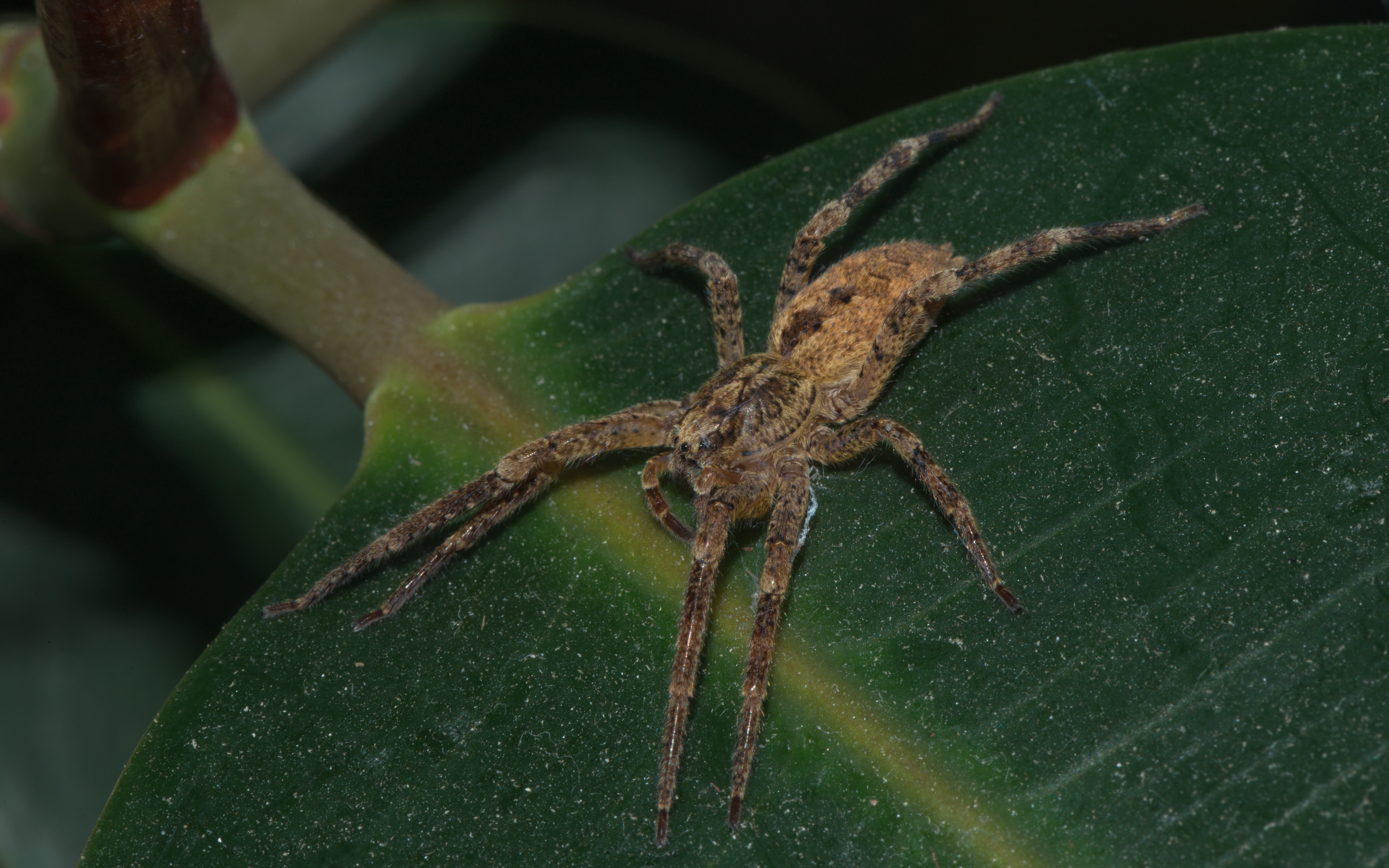
- Zoropsis spinimana

Scientific classification
- Kingdom: Animalia
- Phylum: Arthropoda
- Subphylum: Chelicerata
- Class: Arachnida
- Order: Araneae
- Infraorder: Araneomorphae
- Family: Zoropsidae
- Genus: Zoropsis; Simon, 1878

Species
- See text.

Diversity
- 14 species

= Zoropsis =

Genus of spiders

Zoropsis is a spider genus in the family Zoropsidae. The genus was described in 1878 by Eugène Simon. The genus name comes from Zora C.L.Koch, 1847, another genus of spiders, and the Greek ὄψις (ópsis) "aspect", because the two genera look similar.

== Species ==
- Zoropsis albertisi Pavesi, 1880 (Tunisia)
- Zoropsis beccarii Caporiacco, 1935 (Turkey)
- Zoropsis bilineata Dahl, 1901 (Mallorca, Morocco, Algeria)
  - Zoropsis bilineata viberti Simon, 1910 (Algeria)
- Zoropsis coreana Paik, 1978 (Korea)
- Zoropsis kirghizicus Ovtchinnikov & Zonstein, 2001 (Kyrgyzstan)
- Zoropsis lutea (Thorell, 1875) (Eastern Mediterranean, iran, Ukraine)
- Zoropsis markamensis Hu & Li, 1987 (China)
- Zoropsis media Simon, 1878 (Western Mediterranean)
- Zoropsis oertzeni Dahl, 1901 (Italy, Greece, Balkans, Turkey)
- Zoropsis pekingensis Schenkel, 1953 (China)
- Zoropsis rufipes (Lucas, 1838) (Canary Is., Madeira)
- Zoropsis saba Thaler & van Harten, 2006 (Yemen)
- Zoropsis spinimana (Dufour, 1820) (Mediterranean to Russia (USA, introduced))
- Zoropsis thaleri Levy, 2007 (Israel)
