= Devendra pardalis =

Scientific classification
- Kingdom: Animalia
- Phylum: Arthropoda
- Subphylum: Chelicerata
- Class: Arachnida
- Order: Araneae
- Infraorder: Araneomorphae
- Family: Zoropsidae
- Genus: Devendra
- Species: D. pardalis

Binomial name
- Devendra pardalis (Simon, 1898)

Synonyms
- Campostichomma pardale Simon, 1898

Species of spider

Devendra pardalis is a species of spider of the family Zoropsidae. It is endemic to Sri Lanka.
