= Huntia murrindal =

Scientific classification
- Kingdom: Animalia
- Phylum: Arthropoda
- Subphylum: Chelicerata
- Class: Arachnida
- Order: Araneae
- Infraorder: Araneomorphae
- Family: Zoropsidae
- Genus: Huntia
- Species: H. murrindal

Binomial name
- Huntia murrindal Gray & Thompson, 2001
- Holotype site (AM KS17235 ♀): Anticline Cave, Murrindal, VIC

Species of spider

Huntia murrindal is a cave spider in the family Zoropsidae. It was first described in 2001 by Michael R. Gray & Judith A. Thompson. The genus name honours arachnologist, Glenn Stuart Hunt (1944-1999), and the species epithet, murrindal, references the type locality.

It is known only from the Buchan-Murrindal cave system in Victoria.
