= Lauricius hooki =

Scientific classification
- Domain: Eukaryota
- Kingdom: Animalia
- Phylum: Arthropoda
- Subphylum: Chelicerata
- Class: Arachnida
- Order: Araneae
- Infraorder: Araneomorphae
- Family: Zoropsidae
- Genus: Lauricius
- Species: L. hooki

Binomial name
- Lauricius hooki Gertsch, 1941

Species of spider

Lauricius hooki is a species of false wolf spiders & wandering spiders in the family Zoropsidae. It is found in the United States.
