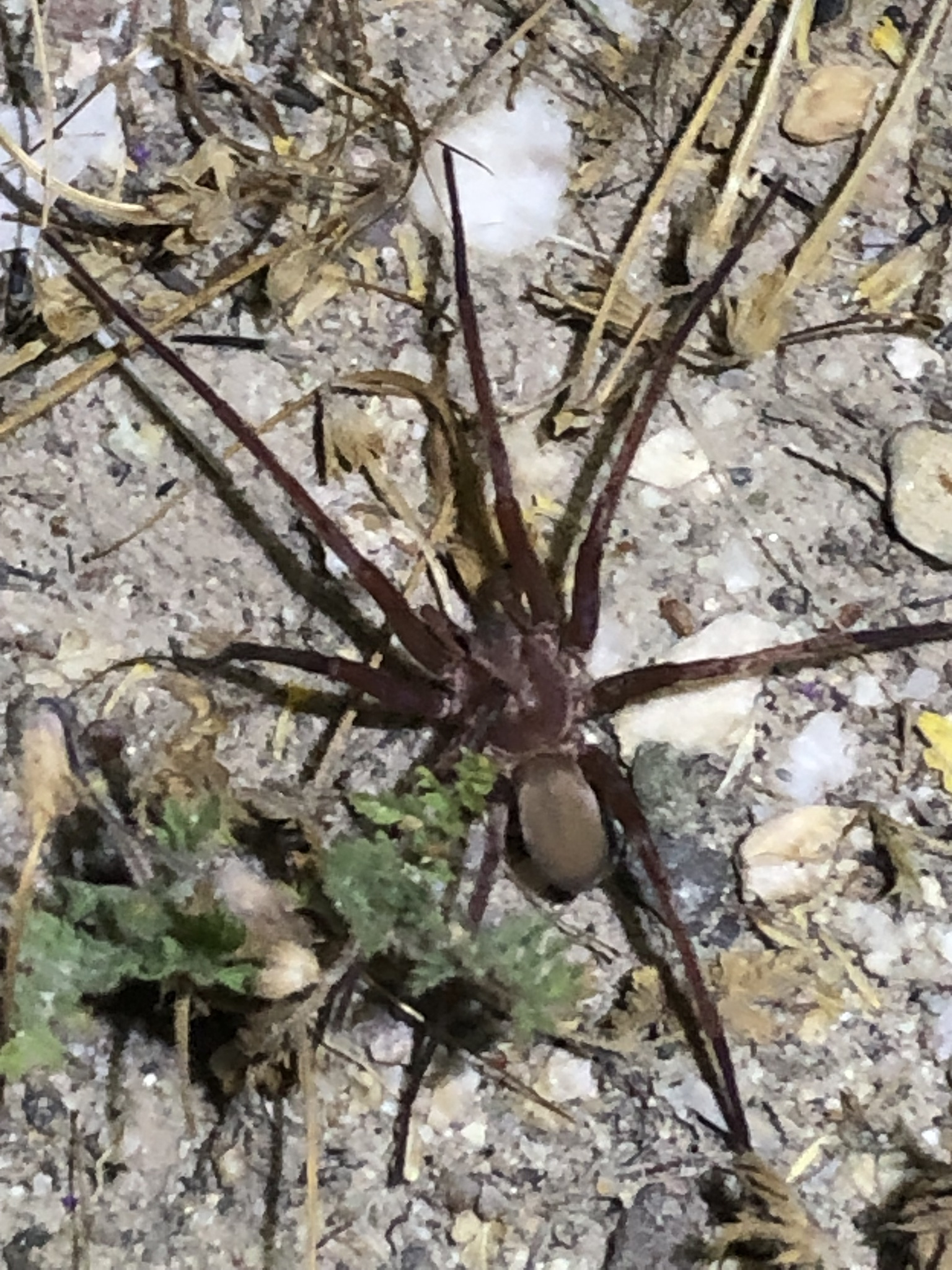
- Titiotus shantzi

Scientific classification
- Kingdom: Animalia
- Phylum: Arthropoda
- Subphylum: Chelicerata
- Class: Arachnida
- Order: Araneae
- Infraorder: Araneomorphae
- Family: Zoropsidae
- Genus: Titiotus
- Species: T. shantzi

Binomial name
- Titiotus shantzi Platnick & Ubick, 2008

= Titiotus shantzi =

Species of spider

Titiotus shantzi is a species of false wolf spiders & wandering spiders in the family Zoropsidae. It is found in the United States.
