= Birrana bulburin =

Scientific classification
- Kingdom: Animalia
- Phylum: Arthropoda
- Subphylum: Chelicerata
- Class: Arachnida
- Order: Araneae
- Infraorder: Araneomorphae
- Family: Zoropsidae
- Genus: Birrana; Raven & Stumkat, 2005
- Species: B. bulburin

Binomial name
- Birrana bulburin Raven & Stumkat, 2005

Species of spider

Birrana bulburin is a species of spiders in the family Zoropsidae, from Queensland, first described by Raven & Stumkat in 2005. It is the only species in the genus Birrana.
