= Devendra saama =

Scientific classification
- Kingdom: Animalia
- Phylum: Arthropoda
- Subphylum: Chelicerata
- Class: Arachnida
- Order: Araneae
- Infraorder: Araneomorphae
- Family: Zoropsidae
- Genus: Devendra
- Species: D. saama

Binomial name
- Devendra saama Polotow & Griswold, 2017

Species of spider

Devendra saama is a species of spider of the family Zoropsidae. It is endemic to the southern highlands of Sri Lanka.

Devendra saama were first described in 2017 by Brazilian arachnologist, Daniele Polotow, and United States arachnologist, Charles Edward Griswold. The species were named after the Sinhalese word for peace.
