= Huntia deepensis =

Scientific classification
- Kingdom: Animalia
- Phylum: Arthropoda
- Subphylum: Chelicerata
- Class: Arachnida
- Order: Araneae
- Infraorder: Araneomorphae
- Family: Zoropsidae
- Genus: Huntia
- Species: H. deepensis

Binomial name
- Huntia deepensis Gray & Thompson 2001
- Holotype site (AM KS3323 ♂): Walpole-Nornalup NP, WA

Species of spider

Huntia deepensis is a species of spider in the Zoropsidae family, endemic to Western Australia. It was first described in 2001 by Australian arachnologists Michael R. Gray and Judith A. Thompson. It is the type species of the genus.
