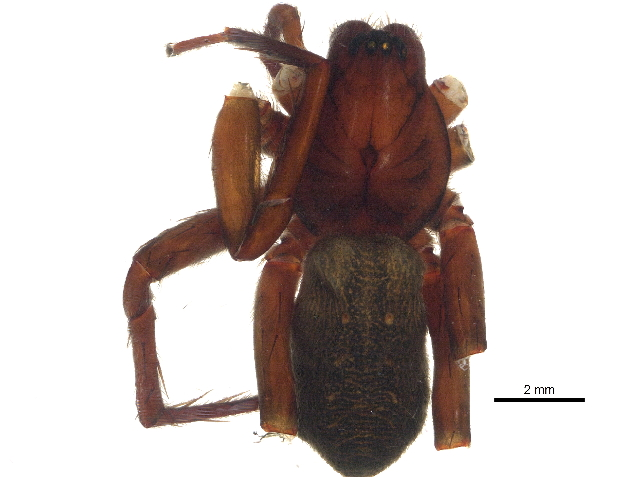

Scientific classification
- Kingdom: Animalia
- Phylum: Arthropoda
- Subphylum: Chelicerata
- Class: Arachnida
- Order: Araneae
- Infraorder: Araneomorphae
- Family: Zoropsidae
- Genus: Anachemmis
- Species: A. linsdalei

Binomial name
- Anachemmis linsdalei Platnick & Ubick, 2005

= Anachemmis linsdalei =

Species of spider

Anachemmis linsdalei is a species of false wolf spiders & wandering spiders in the family Zoropsidae. It is found in the United States and Mexico.
