= Pamiropsis =

Scientific classification
- Kingdom: Animalia
- Phylum: Arthropoda
- Subphylum: Chelicerata
- Class: Arachnida
- Order: Araneae
- Infraorder: Araneomorphae
- Family: Zoropsidae
- Genus: Pamiropsis; Marusik & Fomichev, 2024
- Species: P. murghob

Binomial name
- Pamiropsis murghob Marusik & Fomichev, 2024

Species of spider

Pamiropsis is a monotypic genus of spiders in the family Zoropsidae containing the single species, Pamiropsis murghob.

== Distribution ==
Pamiropsis murghob has been recorded from the Pamir Mountains in Tajikistan.

== Etymology ==
The genus name is a combination of "Pamir Mountains" and the ending "-opsis", indicating its affinity to Zoropsidae. The species is named after Murghob Village near the type locality.
