= Devendra amaiti =

Scientific classification
- Kingdom: Animalia
- Phylum: Arthropoda
- Subphylum: Chelicerata
- Class: Arachnida
- Order: Araneae
- Infraorder: Araneomorphae
- Family: Zoropsidae
- Genus: Devendra
- Species: D. amaiti

Binomial name
- Devendra amaiti (Polotow & Griswold, 2017)

Species of spider

Devendra amaiti is a species of spider of the family Zoropsidae. It is endemic to the southern highlands of Sri Lanka.

D. amaiti were first described in 2017 by Brazilian arachnologist, Daniele Polotow, and United States arachnologist, Charles Edward Griswold. The species were named after the Tamil word for peace.
