= Socalchemmis shantzi =

Scientific classification
- Kingdom: Animalia
- Phylum: Arthropoda
- Subphylum: Chelicerata
- Class: Arachnida
- Order: Araneae
- Infraorder: Araneomorphae
- Family: Zoropsidae
- Genus: Socalchemmis
- Species: S. shantzi

Binomial name
- Socalchemmis shantzi Platnick & Ubick, 2001

Species of spider

Socalchemmis shantzi is a species of false wolf spiders & wandering spiders in the family Zoropsidae. It is found in the United States.
