= Titiotus californicus =

Scientific classification
- Kingdom: Animalia
- Phylum: Arthropoda
- Subphylum: Chelicerata
- Class: Arachnida
- Order: Araneae
- Infraorder: Araneomorphae
- Family: Zoropsidae
- Genus: Titiotus
- Species: T. californicus

Binomial name
- Titiotus californicus Simon, 1897

Species of spider

Titiotus californicus is a species of araneomorphic Araneae of the family Zoropsidae that can be found in the state of California, after which it is aptly named. The species was first described by Eugène Simon in 1897 in his encyclopedic work Histoire Naturelle des Araignées.
