= Megateg elegans =

Scientific classification
- Domain: Eukaryota
- Kingdom: Animalia
- Phylum: Arthropoda
- Subphylum: Chelicerata
- Class: Arachnida
- Order: Araneae
- Infraorder: Araneomorphae
- Family: Zoropsidae
- Genus: Megateg
- Species: M. elegans

Binomial name
- Megateg elegans Raven & Stumkat, 2005

Species of spider

Megateg elegans is a species of spiders in the family Zoropsidae. It is from Queensland.
