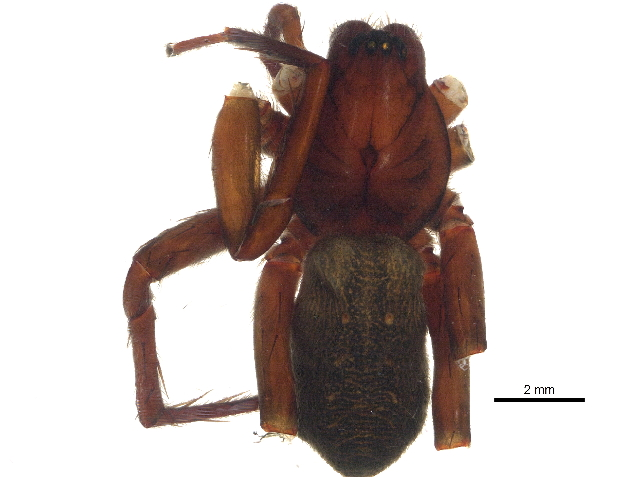
- A. linsdalei, adult female

Scientific classification
- Kingdom: Animalia
- Phylum: Arthropoda
- Subphylum: Chelicerata
- Class: Arachnida
- Order: Araneae
- Infraorder: Araneomorphae
- Family: Zoropsidae
- Genus: Anachemmis; Chamberlin, 1919

Type species
- A. sober Chamberlin, 1919

Species
- 5, see text

= Anachemmis =

Genus of spiders

Anachemmis is a genus of North American false wolf spiders that was first described by Ralph Vary Chamberlin in 1919. It was briefly synonymized with Titiotus, but was reconfirmed as its own distinct genus in 1999.

== Species ==
As of September 2019 it contains five species, found in Mexico and the United States:

- Anachemmis aalbui Platnick & Ubick, 2005 – USA
- Anachemmis beattyi Platnick & Ubick, 2005 – USA, Mexico
- Anachemmis jungi Platnick & Ubick, 2005 – USA
- Anachemmis linsdalei Platnick & Ubick, 2005 – USA
- Anachemmis sober Chamberlin, 1919 (type) – USA

Formerly included

- Anachemmis dolichopus Chamberlin, 1919 = Socalchemmis dolichopus
