= Devendra (spider) =

Scientific classification
- Kingdom: Animalia
- Phylum: Arthropoda
- Subphylum: Chelicerata
- Class: Arachnida
- Order: Araneae
- Infraorder: Araneomorphae
- Family: Zoropsidae
- Genus: Devendra; Lehtinen, 1967

Type species
- Campostichomma pardale Simon, 1898

Species
- 5, see text

Genus of spiders

Devendra is a genus of Asian false wolf spiders first described by Pekka T. Lehtinen in 1967. The genus is endemic to Sri Lanka.

== Species ==
As of June 2021 it contains five species:

- Devendra amaiti Polotow & Griswold, 2017 — Sri Lanka
- Devendra pardalis (Simon, 1898) — Sri Lanka
- Devendra pumilus (Simon, 1898) — Sri Lanka
- Devendra saama Polotow & Griswold, 2017 — Sri Lanka
- Devendra seriatus (Simon, 1898) — Sri Lanka
