= Hoedillus =

Scientific classification
- Kingdom: Animalia
- Phylum: Arthropoda
- Subphylum: Chelicerata
- Class: Arachnida
- Order: Araneae
- Infraorder: Araneomorphae
- Family: Zoropsidae
- Genus: Hoedillus
- Species: H. sexpunctatus

Binomial name
- Hoedillus sexpunctatus Simon, 1898

Genus of spiders

Hoedillus is a genus of spiders in the family Zoropsidae. It was first described in 1898 by Simon. As of 2017, it contains only one species, Hoedillus sexpunctatus, found in Guatemala and Nicaragua.
