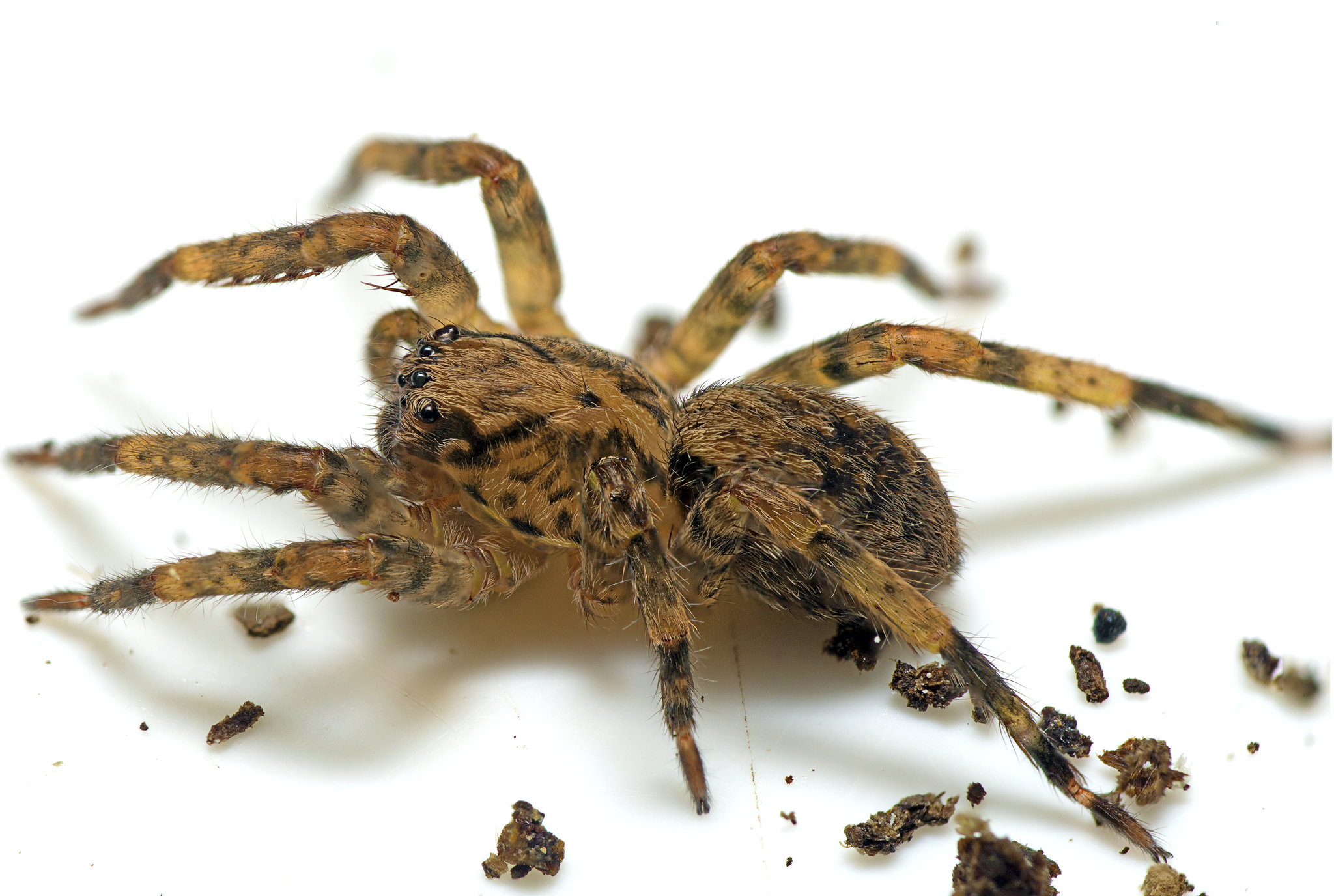
- Kilyana hendersoni

Scientific classification
- Domain: Eukaryota
- Kingdom: Animalia
- Phylum: Arthropoda
- Subphylum: Chelicerata
- Class: Arachnida
- Order: Araneae
- Infraorder: Araneomorphae
- Family: Zoropsidae
- Genus: Kilyana; Stumkat

Type species
- Kilyana hendersoni

Species
- 10, see text

= Kilyana =

Genus of spiders

Kilyana is a genus of spiders in the family Zoropsidae. It was first described in 2005 by Raven & Stumkat. As of 2017, it contains 10 species, all found either in Queensland or in New South Wales.

== Species ==
Kilyana comprises the following species:

- Kilyana bicarinatus Raven & Stumkat, 2005
- Kilyana campbelli Raven & Stumkat, 2005
- Kilyana corbeni Raven & Stumkat, 2005
- Kilyana dougcooki Raven & Stumkat, 2005
- Kilyana eungella Raven & Stumkat, 2005
- Kilyana hendersoni Raven & Stumkat, 2005
- Kilyana ingrami Raven & Stumkat, 2005
- Kilyana kroombit Raven & Stumkat, 2005
- Kilyana lorne Raven & Stumkat, 2005
- Kilyana obrieni Raven & Stumkat, 2005
