= Krukt =

Scientific classification
- Kingdom: Animalia
- Phylum: Arthropoda
- Subphylum: Chelicerata
- Class: Arachnida
- Order: Araneae
- Infraorder: Araneomorphae
- Family: Zoropsidae
- Genus: Krukt; Stumkat

Type species
- Krukt piligyna

Species
- Krukt cannoni Raven & Stumkat, 2005; Krukt ebbenielseni Raven & Stumkat, 2005; Krukt megma Raven & Stumkat, 2005; Krukt piligyna Raven & Stumkat, 2005; Krukt vicoopsae Raven & Stumkat, 2005

Genus of spiders

Krukt is a genus of spiders in the family Zoropsidae. It was first described in 2005 by Raven & Stumkat. As of 2017, it contains 5 species, all found in Queensland.
