= Pseudoctenus =

Scientific classification
- Domain: Eukaryota
- Kingdom: Animalia
- Phylum: Arthropoda
- Subphylum: Chelicerata
- Class: Arachnida
- Order: Araneae
- Infraorder: Araneomorphae
- Family: Zoropsidae
- Genus: Pseudoctenus; Caporiacco

Type species
- Pseudoctenus meneghettii

Species
- Pseudoctenus meneghettii Caporiacco, 1949 - Kenya, Burundi; Pseudoctenus thaleri Jocqué, 2009 - Malawi

Genus of spiders

Pseudoctenus is a genus of spiders in the family Zoropsidae. It was first described in 1949 by Caporiacco. As of 2017, it contains 2 species.
