= Itatiaya =

Scientific classification
- Kingdom: Animalia
- Phylum: Arthropoda
- Subphylum: Chelicerata
- Class: Arachnida
- Order: Araneae
- Infraorder: Araneomorphae
- Family: Zoropsidae
- Genus: Itatiaya; Mello-Leitão

Type species
- Itatiaya modesta

Species
- 8, see text

Genus of spiders

Itatiaya is a genus of spiders in the family Zoropsidae. It was first described in 1915 by Mello-Leitão. As of 2017, it contains 8 species, all found in Brazil.

== Species ==
Itatiaya comprises the following species:

- Itatiaya apipema Polotow & Brescovit, 2006
- Itatiaya iuba Polotow & Brescovit, 2006
- Itatiaya modesta Mello-Leitão, 1915
- Itatiaya pucupucu Polotow & Brescovit, 2006
- Itatiaya pykyyra Polotow & Brescovit, 2006
- Itatiaya tacamby Polotow & Brescovit, 2006
- Itatiaya tubixaba Polotow & Brescovit, 2006
- Itatiaya ywyty Polotow & Brescovit, 2006
