= Takeoa =

Scientific classification
- Kingdom: Animalia
- Phylum: Arthropoda
- Subphylum: Chelicerata
- Class: Arachnida
- Order: Araneae
- Infraorder: Araneomorphae
- Family: Zoropsidae
- Genus: Takeoa; Lehtinen

Type species
- Takeoa nishimurai

Species
- Takeoa huangshan Tang, Xu & Zhu, 2004 - China; Takeoa nishimurai (Yaginuma, 1963) - China, Korea, Japan

Genus of spiders

Takeoa is a genus of spiders in the family Zoropsidae. It was first described in 1967 by Lehtinen. As of 2017, it contains 2 species, both found in Asia.
