= Huntia =

Scientific classification
- Kingdom: Animalia
- Phylum: Arthropoda
- Subphylum: Chelicerata
- Class: Arachnida
- Order: Araneae
- Infraorder: Araneomorphae
- Family: Zoropsidae
- Genus: Huntia; Gray & Thompson, 2001

Genus of spiders

Huntia is a genus of spiders in the family Zoropsidae. It was first described in 2001 by Michael R. Gray & Judith A. Thompson. As of 2017, it contains two species, both from Australia.

The genus name honours arachnologist, Glenn Stuart Hunt (1944-1999).

== Species ==
Huntia comprises the following species:

- Huntia deepensis Gray & Thompson, 2001^{T} – Western Australia (including Queensland)
- Huntia murrindal Gray & Thompson, 2001 – Victoria
