= Cauquenia =

Scientific classification
- Kingdom: Animalia
- Phylum: Arthropoda
- Subphylum: Chelicerata
- Class: Arachnida
- Order: Araneae
- Infraorder: Araneomorphae
- Family: Zoropsidae
- Genus: Cauquenia
- Species: C. maule

Binomial name
- Cauquenia maule Piacentini, Ramírez & Silva, 2013

Genus of spiders

Cauquenia is a genus of spiders in the family Zoropsidae. It was first described in 2013 by Piacentini, Ramírez & Silva. As of 2017, it contains only one species, Cauquenia maule, found in Chile.
