= Megateg =

Scientific classification
- Domain: Eukaryota
- Kingdom: Animalia
- Phylum: Arthropoda
- Subphylum: Chelicerata
- Class: Arachnida
- Order: Araneae
- Infraorder: Araneomorphae
- Family: Zoropsidae
- Genus: Megateg; Stumkat

Type species
- Megateg ramboldi

Species
- 8, see text

Genus of spiders

Megateg is a genus of spiders in the family Zoropsidae. It was first described in 2005 by Raven & Stumkat. As of 2017, it contains 8 species, all from Queensland.

== Species ==
Megateg comprises the following species:

- Megateg bartholomai Raven & Stumkat, 2005
- Megateg covacevichae Raven & Stumkat, 2005
- Megateg elegans Raven & Stumkat, 2005
- Megateg gigasep Raven & Stumkat, 2005
- Megateg lesbiae Raven & Stumkat, 2005
- Megateg paulstumkati Raven & Stumkat, 2005
- Megateg ramboldi Raven & Stumkat, 2005
- Megateg spurgeon Raven & Stumkat, 2005
