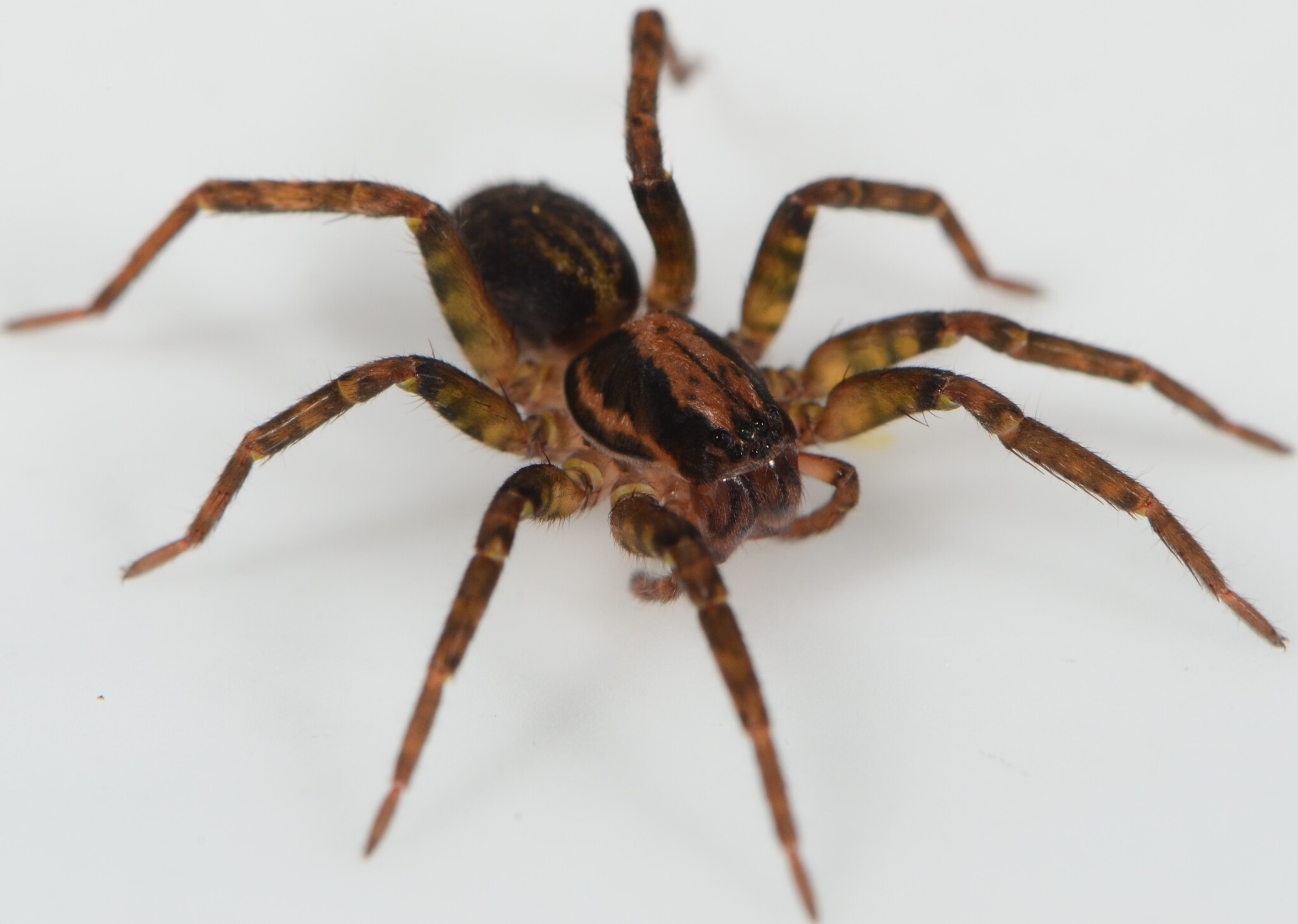
- female
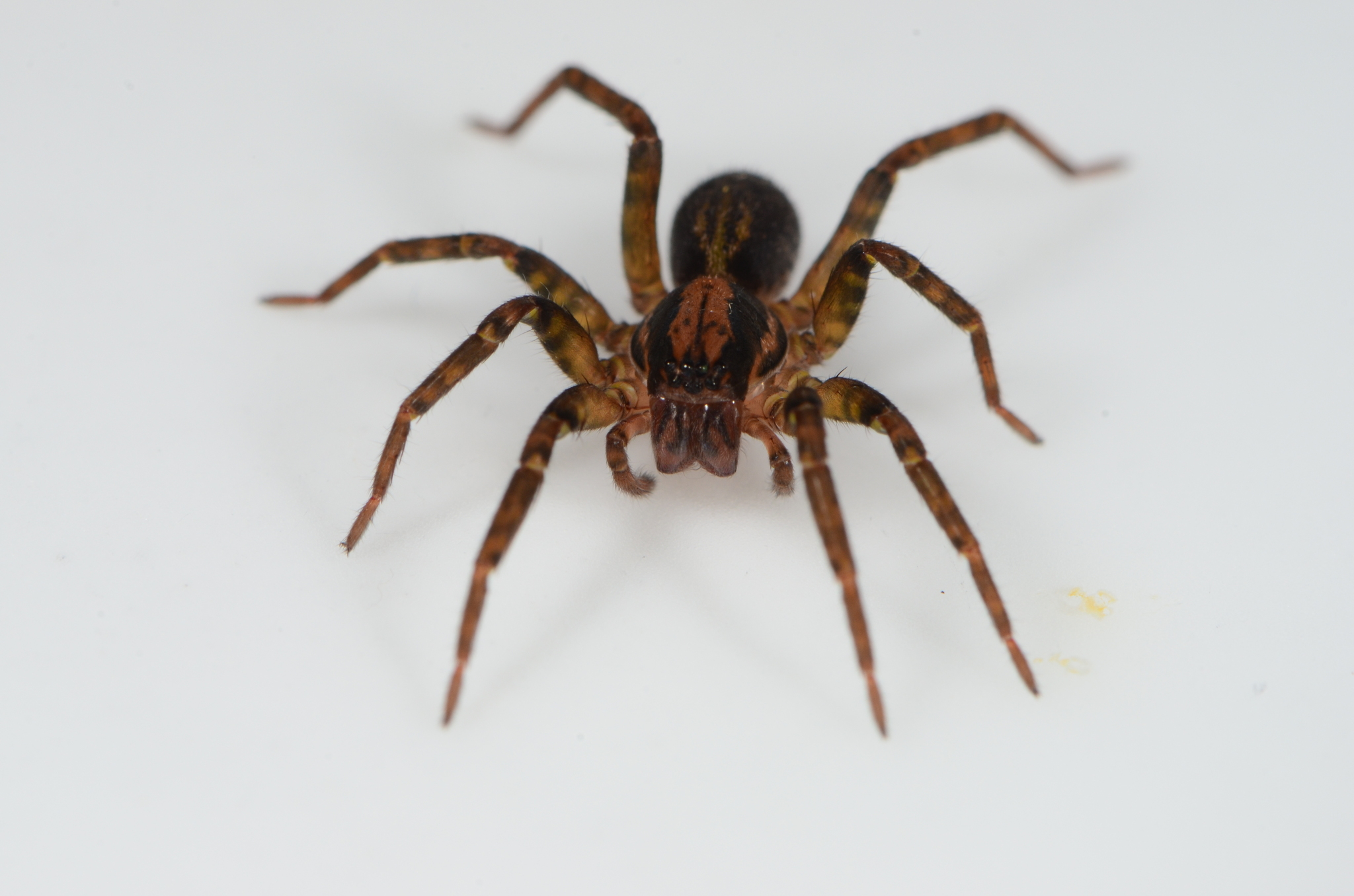
- female

Scientific classification
- Kingdom: Animalia
- Phylum: Arthropoda
- Subphylum: Chelicerata
- Class: Arachnida
- Order: Araneae
- Infraorder: Araneomorphae
- Family: Zoropsidae
- Genus: Griswoldia; Dippenaar-Schoeman & Jocqué, 1997

Type species
- G. robusta (Simon, 1898)

Species
- 12, see text

= Griswoldia =

Genus of spiders

Griswoldia is a genus of southern African false wolf spiders. It was first described by A. S. Dippenaar-Schoeman and Rudy Jocqué in 1997,. All described species are endemic to South Africa.

== Species ==
As of October 2025, this genus includes twelve species:

- Griswoldia acaenata (Griswold, 1991)
- Griswoldia disparilis (Lawrence, 1952)
- Griswoldia leleupi (Griswold, 1991)
- Griswoldia meikleae (Griswold, 1991)
- Griswoldia melana (Lawrence, 1938)
- Griswoldia natalensis (Lawrence, 1938)
- Griswoldia punctata (Lawrence, 1942)
- Griswoldia robusta (Simon, 1898) (type species)
- Griswoldia sibyna (Griswold, 1991)
- Griswoldia transversa (Griswold, 1991)
- Griswoldia urbensis (Lawrence, 1942)
- Griswoldia zuluensis (Lawrence, 1938)
