= Chinja =

Scientific classification
- Kingdom: Animalia
- Phylum: Arthropoda
- Subphylum: Chelicerata
- Class: Arachnida
- Order: Araneae
- Infraorder: Araneomorphae
- Family: Zoropsidae
- Genus: Chinja; Polotow & Griswold, 2018

Type species
- C. chinja Polotow & Griswold, 2018

Species
- C. chinja Polotow & Griswold, 2018 — Tanzania; C. scharffi Polotow & Griswold, 2018 — Tanzania

Genus of spiders

Chinja is a genus of Tanzanian araneomorph spiders in the family Zoropsidae, first described by D. Polotow & C. Griswold in 2018. As of April 2019 it contains only two species.
