= Akamasia =

Scientific classification
- Kingdom: Animalia
- Phylum: Arthropoda
- Subphylum: Chelicerata
- Class: Arachnida
- Order: Araneae
- Infraorder: Araneomorphae
- Family: Zoropsidae
- Genus: Akamasia; Bosselaers, 2002
- Species: A. cyprogenia

Binomial name
- Akamasia cyprogenia (Bosselaers, 1997)

Genus of spiders

Akamasia is a monotypic genus of spiders in the family Zoropsidae. It was first described by Bosselaers in 2002. As of 2023, it contains only one species, Akamasia cyprogenia, found in Cyprus.
