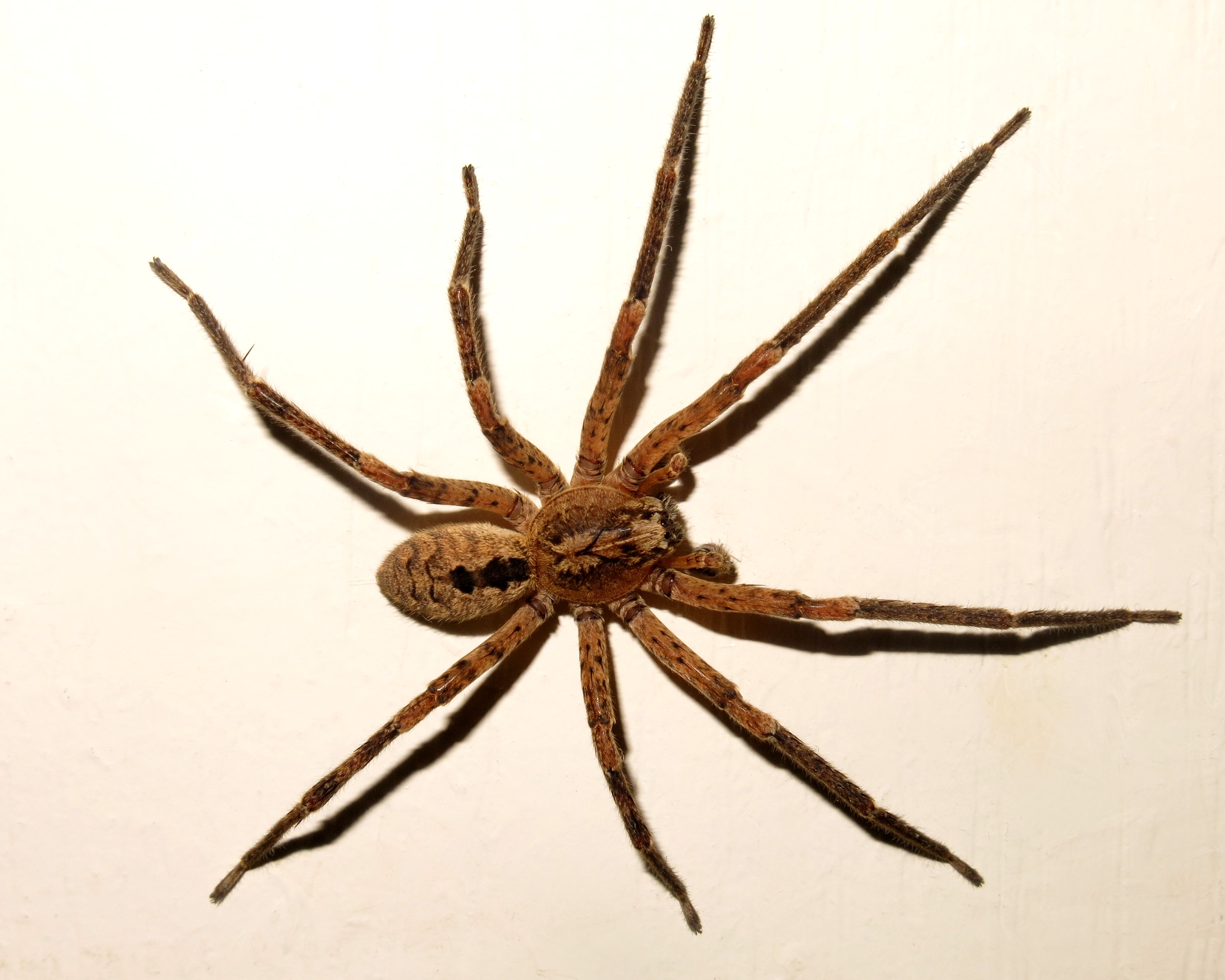

Scientific classification
- Kingdom: Animalia
- Phylum: Arthropoda
- Subphylum: Chelicerata
- Class: Arachnida
- Order: Araneae
- Infraorder: Araneomorphae
- Family: Zoropsidae
- Genus: Zoropsis
- Species: Z. spinimana

Binomial name
- Zoropsis spinimana (Dufour, 1820)

= Zoropsis spinimana =

Species of spider

Zoropsis spinimana, also known as Nosferatu spider, is a spider species belonging to the family Zoropsidae.

== Description ==
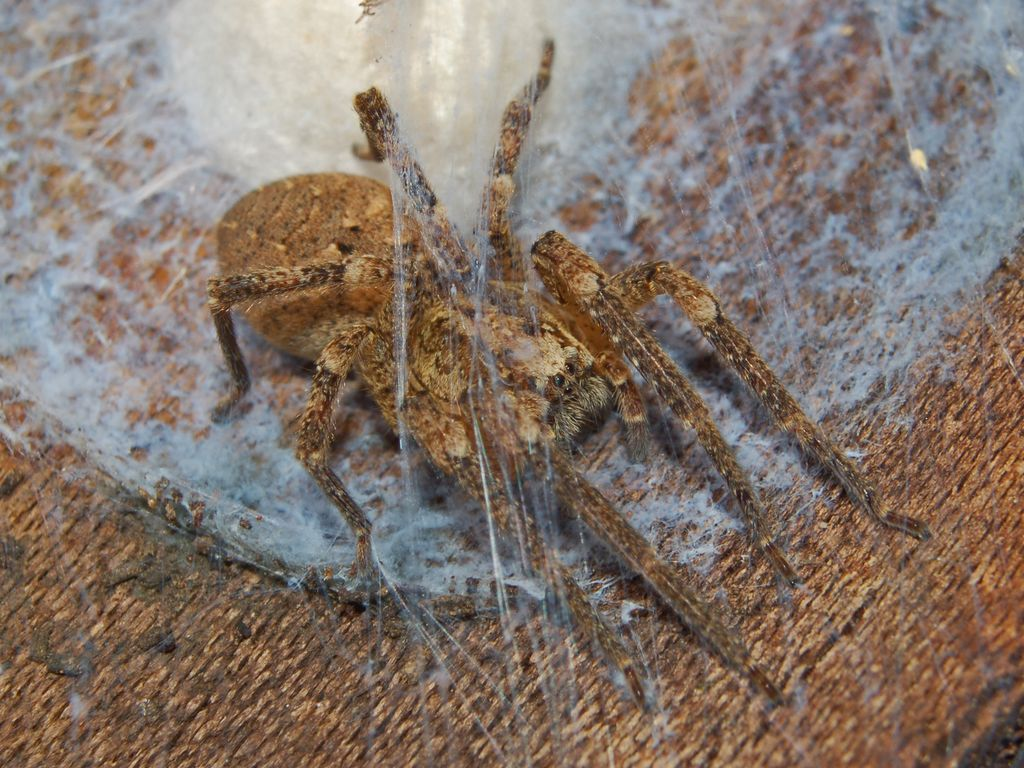
Zoropsis spinimana

Males of Z. spinimana reach a length around 10–12 mm (0.39–0.47 in), while females are 15–18 mm (0.59–0.71 in) long. This spider resembles a wolf spider, as its eyes are of the same configuration, but unlike wolf spiders, the eyes of Zoropsis spiders are more spread out along the front third of the cephalothorax. The front body (prosoma) is brownish with broad, darker markings. The abdomen (opisthosoma) has median black markings. The legs are mainly a speckled brown color.

The brown and light marking on the upper side of the front body evokes the face of the vampire of the 1922 German silent film Nosferatu, which led to the common German name of the spider, Nosferatu-Spinne.

== Distribution ==
Zoropsis spinimana is distributed widely in the Mediterranean, but reaches into Russia, and was introduced to the United States, primarily in the San Francisco Bay Area, and the United Kingdom, primarily the London area.

Since the mid-1990s, the species has been sighted along Europe's North-South transport routes, like Lucerne, Basel, Freiburg im Breisgau, Duisburg, Brussels, Innsbruck. It is not clear why the relatively large spider was not found there earlier, as Mediterranean holidays with mobile homes were popular in the 1970s, and would have provided the spiders with many suitable habitats and transport opportunities. Ecologists assume that climate change enabled the spiders to take hold and reproduce north of the Alps. Recent finds presumably near the northern border of the current distribution range include a 2023 find in Copenhagen.

== Habitat ==
Spiders of the species can be found on forest edges under rocks and tree bark, where they hunt for prey during the night. Like all zoropsid spiders, Z. spinimana does not build a web, but hunts freely. Since this spider cannot survive in a harsh climate, it often seeks refuge in human habitation and is frequently found in houses, where the temperature is milder and food is more abundant.

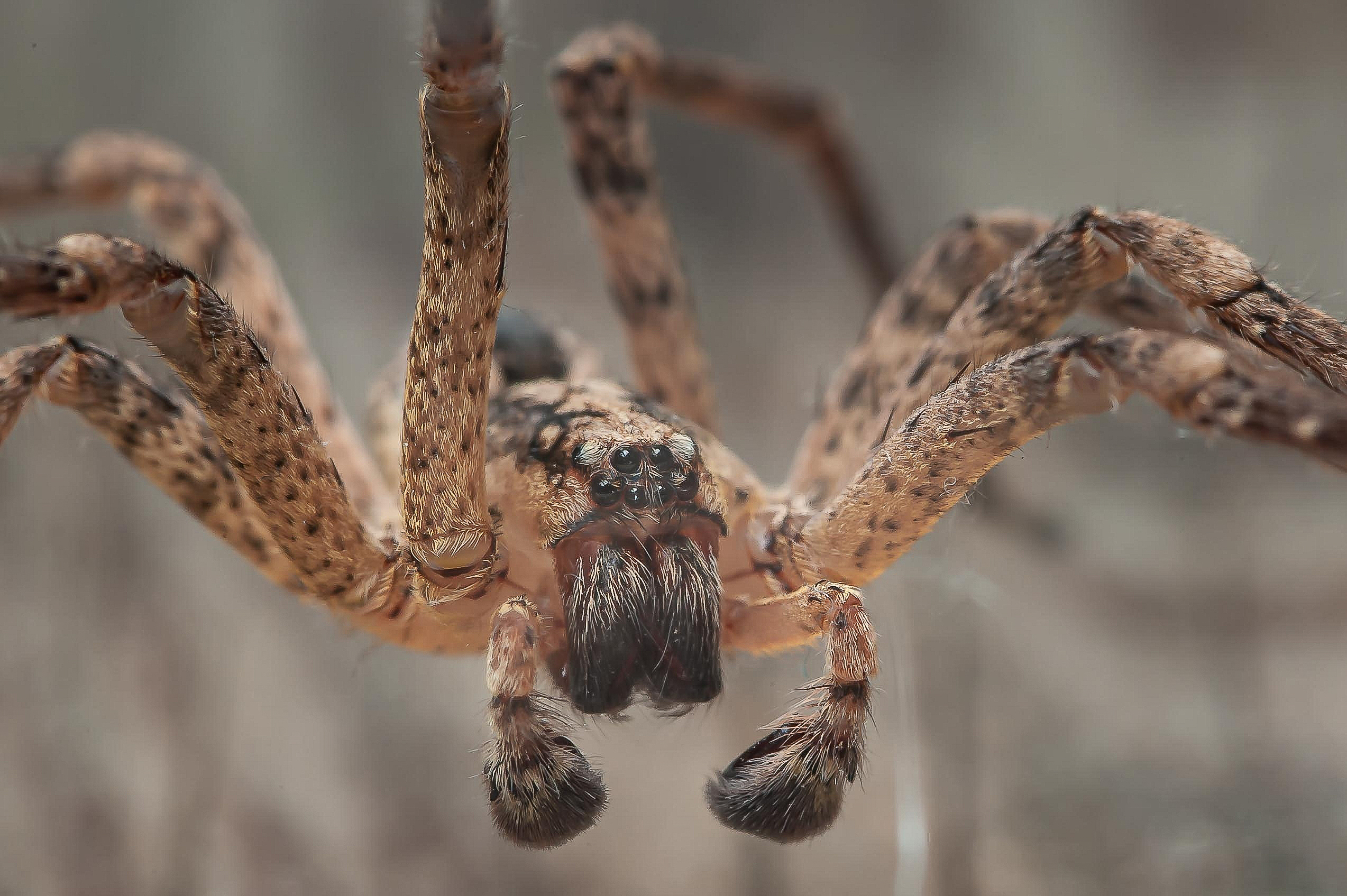
Male specimen

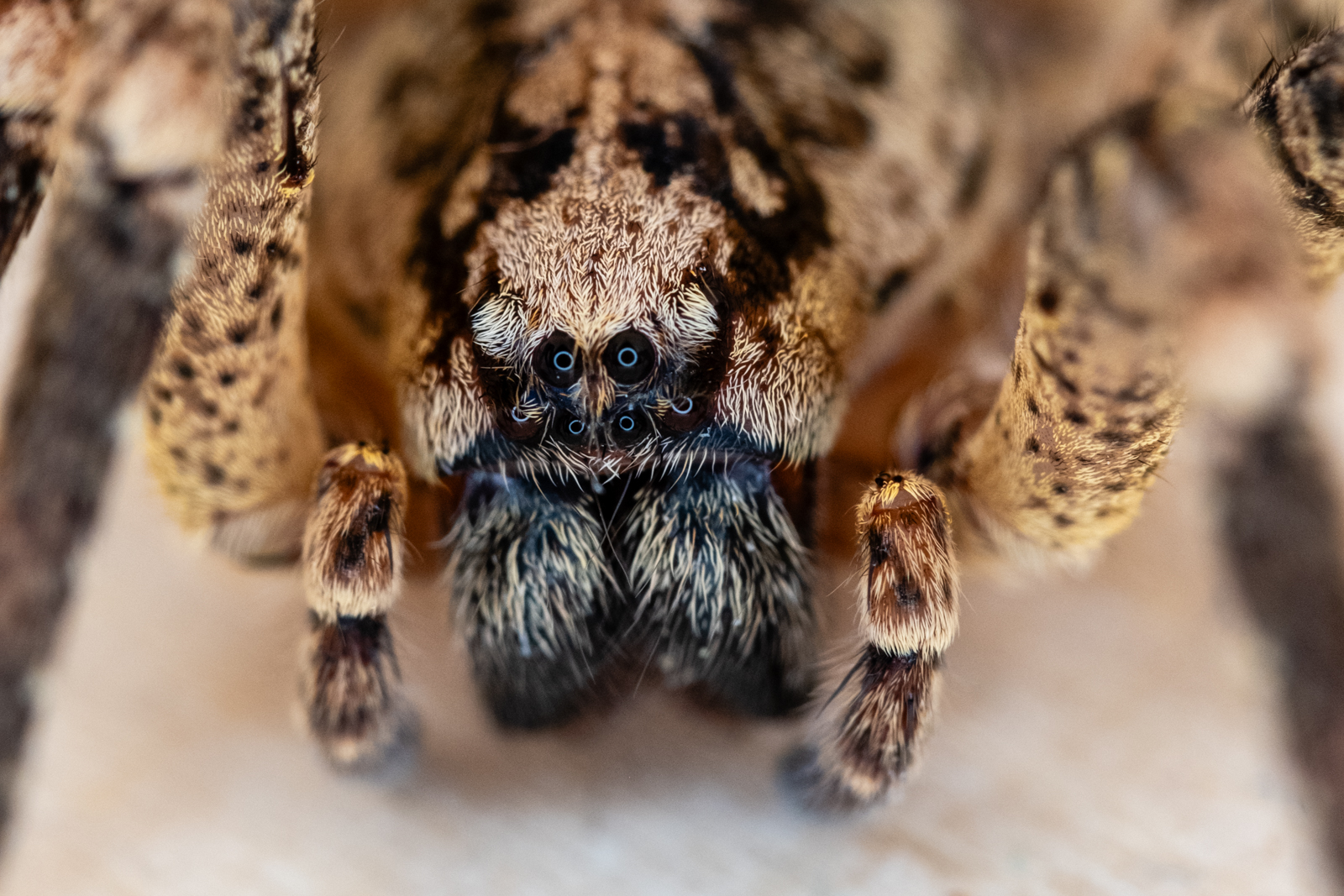
Female specimen

== Reproduction ==
Spiders of this species are sexually mature in autumn. The females lay eggs in spring, resting in a brood chamber on the cocoon.
