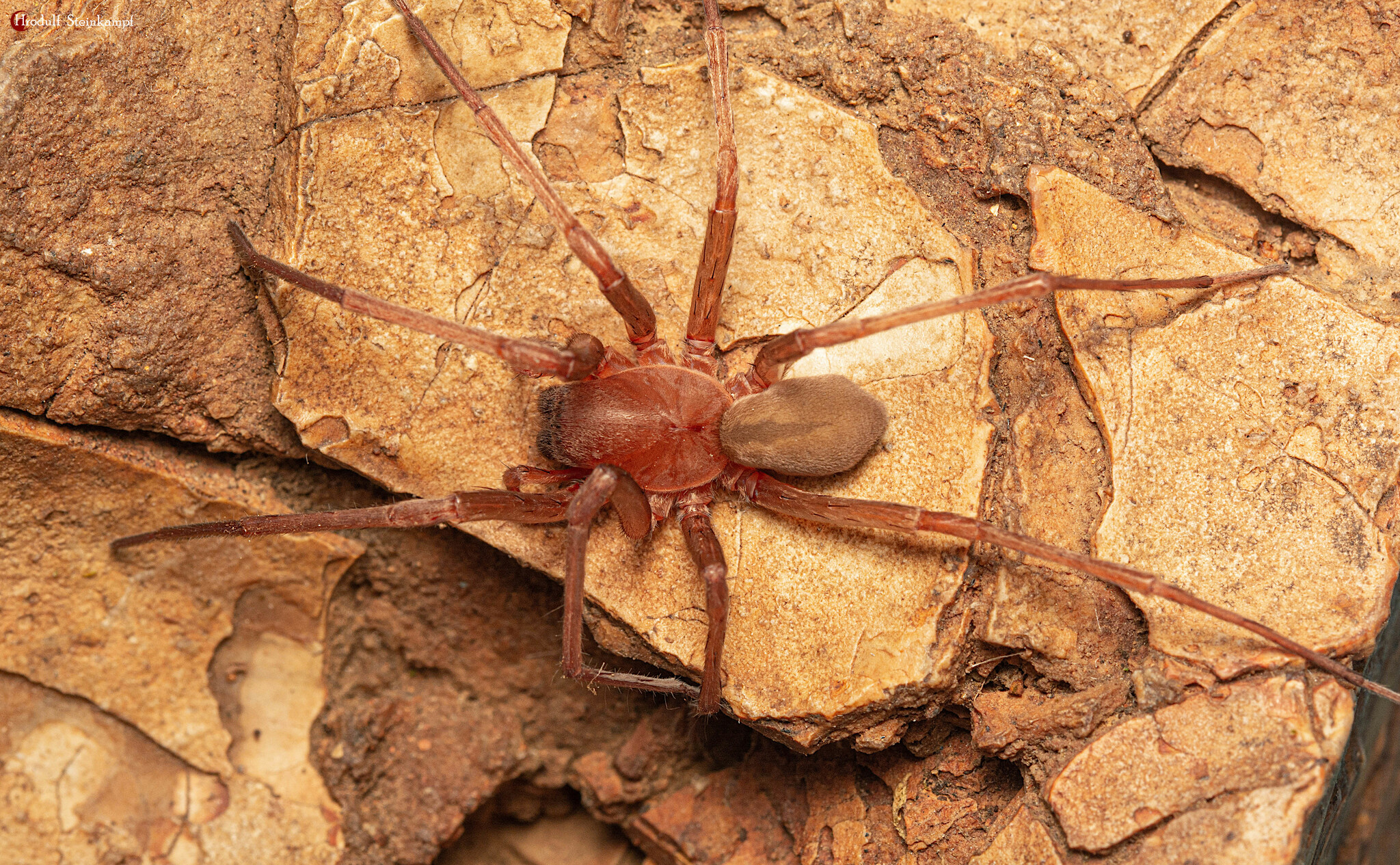
- P. peringuey
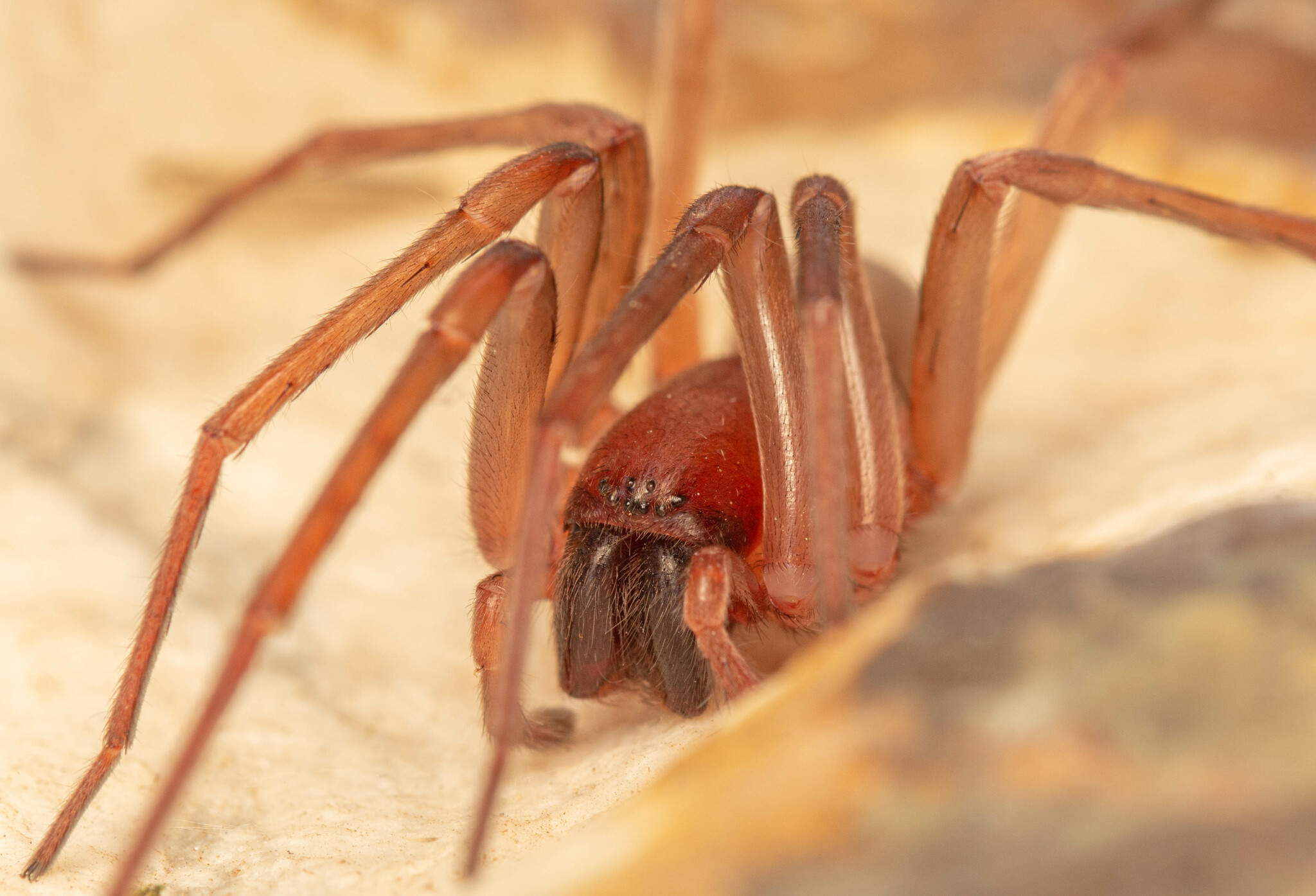
- P. peringuey

Scientific classification
- Kingdom: Animalia
- Phylum: Arthropoda
- Subphylum: Chelicerata
- Class: Arachnida
- Order: Araneae
- Infraorder: Araneomorphae
- Family: Zoropsidae
- Genus: Phanotea; Simon

Type species
- Phanotea peringueyi

Species
- 13, see text

= Phanotea =

Genus of spiders

Phanotea is a genus of spiders in the family Zoropsidae. It was first described in 1896 by Simon. All described species are endemic to South Africa.

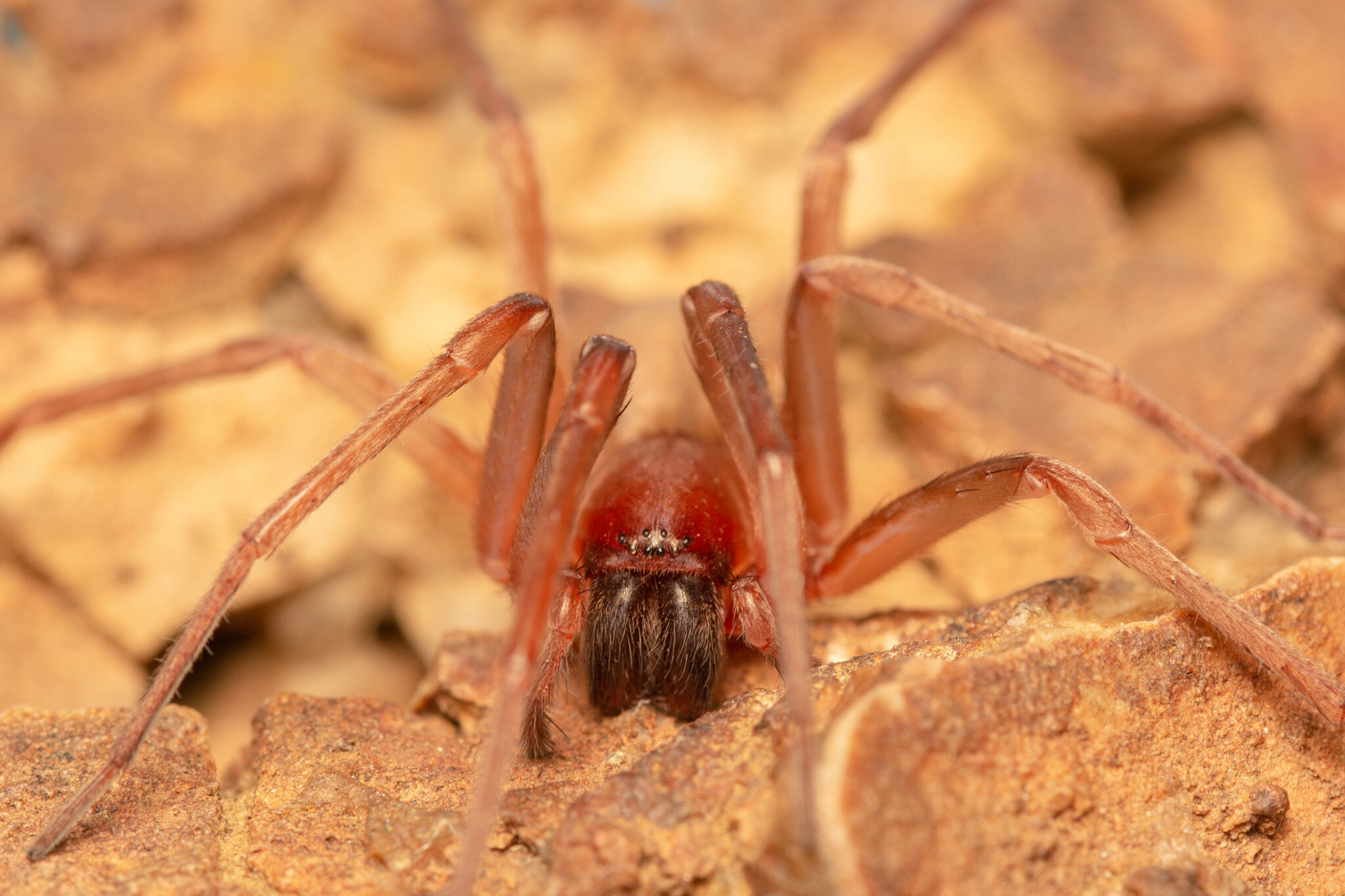
P. peringuey

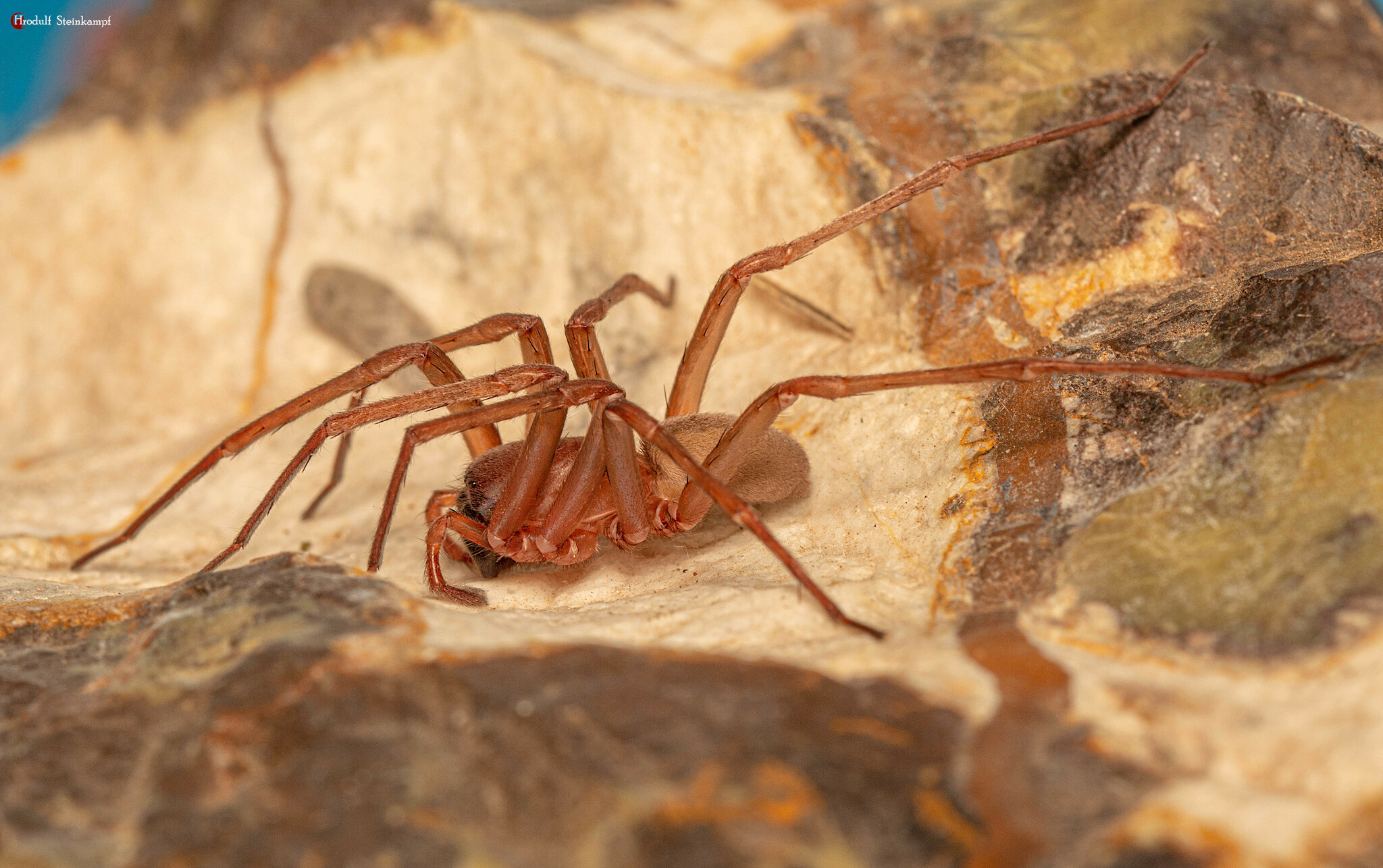
P. peringuey

== Species ==
As of October 2025, this genus includes thirteen species:

- Phanotea cavata Griswold, 1994
- Phanotea ceratogyna Griswold, 1994
- Phanotea digitata Griswold, 1994
- Phanotea knysna Griswold, 1994
- Phanotea lata Griswold, 1994
- Phanotea latebricola Lawrence, 1952
- Phanotea margarita Griswold, 1994
- Phanotea natalensis Lawrence, 1951
- Phanotea orestria Griswold, 1994
- Phanotea peringueyi Simon, 1896 (type species)
- Phanotea sathegyna Griswold, 1994
- Phanotea simoni Lawrence, 1951
- Phanotea xhosa Griswold, 1994
