= Austrotengella =

Scientific classification
- Kingdom: Animalia
- Phylum: Arthropoda
- Subphylum: Chelicerata
- Class: Arachnida
- Order: Araneae
- Infraorder: Araneomorphae
- Family: Zoropsidae
- Genus: Austrotengella; Raven, 2012

Type species
- A. toddae Raven, 2012

Species
- 6, see text

Genus of spiders

Austrotengella is a genus of Australian false wolf spiders that was first described by Robert John Raven in 2012.

== Species ==
As of September 2019 it contains six species, found in New South Wales and Queensland:

- Austrotengella hackerae Raven, 2012 – Australia (Queensland)
- Austrotengella hebronae Raven, 2012 – Australia (New South Wales)
- Austrotengella monteithi Raven, 2012 – Australia (Queensland)
- Austrotengella plimeri Raven, 2012 – Australia (New South Wales)
- Austrotengella toddae Raven, 2012 (type) – Australia (Queensland, New South Wales)
- Austrotengella wrighti Raven, 2012 – Australia (Queensland, New South Wales)
