= Ciniflella =

Scientific classification
- Domain: Eukaryota
- Kingdom: Animalia
- Phylum: Arthropoda
- Subphylum: Chelicerata
- Class: Arachnida
- Order: Araneae
- Infraorder: Araneomorphae
- Family: Zoropsidae
- Genus: Ciniflella; Mello-Leitão, 1921
- Species: C. lutea

Binomial name
- Ciniflella lutea Mello-Leitão, 1921

Genus of spiders

Ciniflella is a genus of South American false wolf spiders containing the single species, Ciniflella lutea. It was first described by Cândido Firmino de Mello-Leitão in 1921, and has only been found in Brazil.
