= Tengella =

Scientific classification
- Kingdom: Animalia
- Phylum: Arthropoda
- Subphylum: Chelicerata
- Class: Arachnida
- Order: Araneae
- Infraorder: Araneomorphae
- Family: Zoropsidae
- Genus: Tengella; Dahl, 1901

Type species
- T. perfuga Dahl, 1901

Species
- 5, see text

Synonyms
- Metafecenia F. O. Pickard-Cambridge, 1902

Genus of spiders

Tengella is a genus of false wolf spiders that was first described by Friedrich Dahl in 1901. It is a senior synonym of Metafecenia.

== Species ==
As of September 2019 it contains five species, found in Panama, Honduras, Nicaragua, and Mexico:

- Tengella albolineata (F. O. Pickard-Cambridge, 1902) – Mexico
- Tengella kalebi Candia-Ramírez & Valdez-Mondragón, 2014 – Mexico
- Tengella perfuga Dahl, 1901 – Nicaragua
- Tengella radiata (Kulczyński, 1909) – Honduras to Panama
- Tengella thaleri Platnick, 2009 – Mexico
