= Liocranoides =

Scientific classification
- Kingdom: Animalia
- Phylum: Arthropoda
- Subphylum: Chelicerata
- Class: Arachnida
- Order: Araneae
- Infraorder: Araneomorphae
- Family: Zoropsidae
- Genus: Liocranoides; Keyserling, 1881

Type species
- L. unicolor Keyserling, 1881

Species
- 5, see text

Genus of spiders

Liocranoides is a genus of American false wolf spiders that was first described by Eugen von Keyserling in 1881. They live in habitats with cold surfaces, such as caves. It was transferred from the sac spiders to the Tengellidae in 1967, which was later merged with Zoropsidae.

== Species ==
As of September 2019 it contains five species, found Alabama, Georgia, Kentucky, North Carolina, Tennessee, and Virginia:

- Liocranoides archeri Platnick, 1999 – USA
- Liocranoides coylei Platnick, 1999 – USA
- Liocranoides gertschi Platnick, 1999 – USA
- Liocranoides tennesseensis Platnick, 1999 – USA
- Liocranoides unicolor Keyserling, 1881 (type) – USA
