= Wiltona =

Scientific classification
- Kingdom: Animalia
- Phylum: Arthropoda
- Subphylum: Chelicerata
- Class: Arachnida
- Order: Araneae
- Infraorder: Araneomorphae
- Family: Zoropsidae
- Genus: Wiltona; Koçak & Kemal, 2008
- Species: W. filicicola

Binomial name
- Wiltona filicicola (Forster & Wilton, 1973)

Genus of spiders

Wiltona is a monotypic genus of New Zealand false wolf spiders containing the single species, Wiltona filicicola. It was first described by Raymond Robert Forster in 1973 as Haurokoa filicicola. However, this name was already used for an extinct genus of triton shells, and it was renamed Wiltona by A. Ö. Koçak & M. Kemal in 2008.
