= Lauricius =

Scientific classification
- Kingdom: Animalia
- Phylum: Arthropoda
- Subphylum: Chelicerata
- Class: Arachnida
- Order: Araneae
- Infraorder: Araneomorphae
- Family: Zoropsidae
- Genus: Lauricius; Simon, 1888

Type species
- L. hemicloeinus Simon, 1888

Species
- L. hemicloeinus Simon, 1888 – Mexico; L. hooki Gertsch, 1941 – USA

Genus of spiders

Lauricius is a genus of North American false wolf spiders that was first described by Eugène Louis Simon in 1888. As of September 2019 it contains two species, found in the United States and Mexico: L. hemicloeinus and L. hooki. Originally placed with the sac spiders, it was transferred to the Zoropsidae in 1967.
