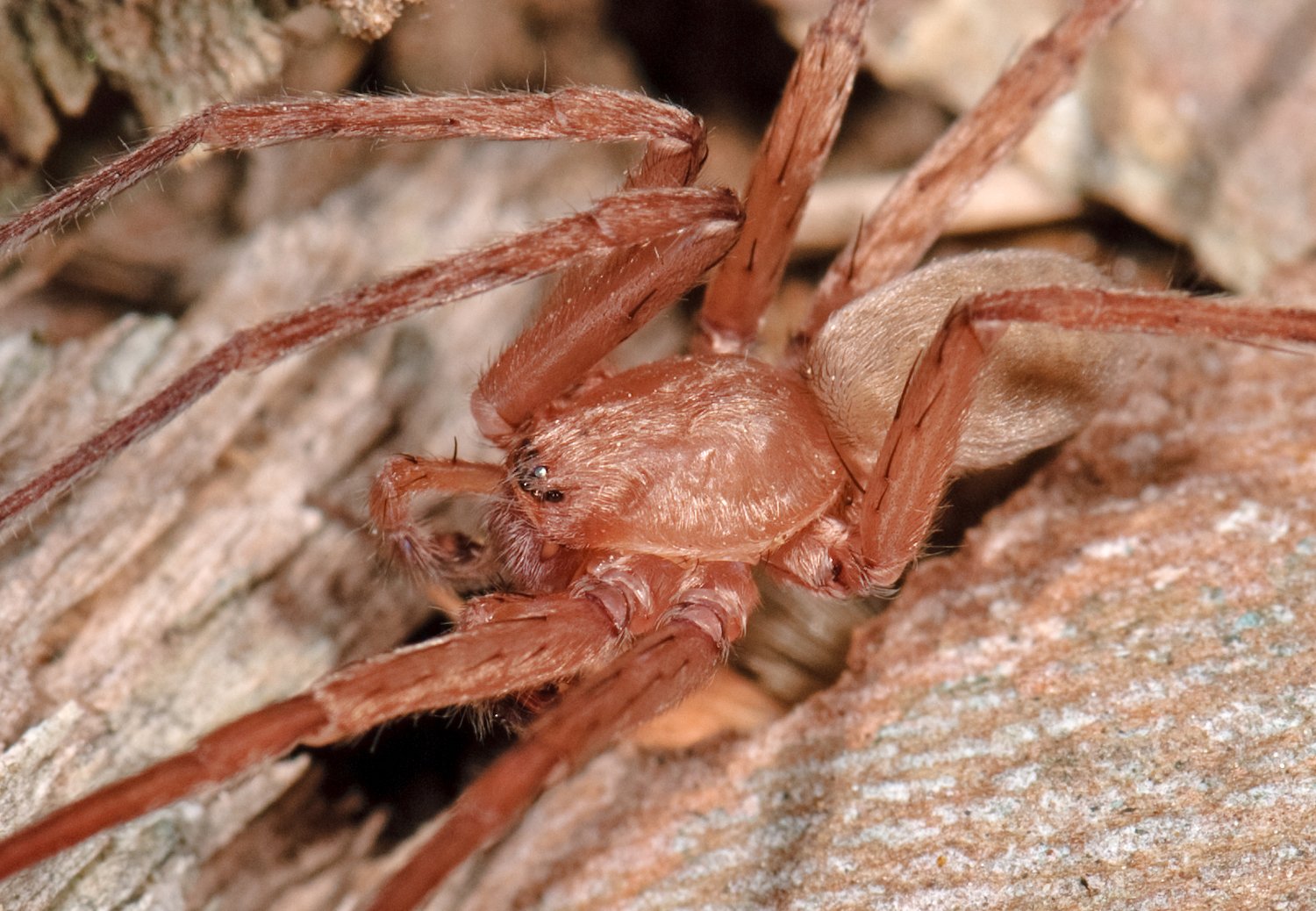
- Socalchemmis kastoni

Scientific classification
- Kingdom: Animalia
- Phylum: Arthropoda
- Subphylum: Chelicerata
- Class: Arachnida
- Order: Araneae
- Infraorder: Araneomorphae
- Family: Zoropsidae
- Genus: Socalchemmis; Platnick & Ubick, 2001

Type species
- S. dolichopus (Chamberlin, 1919)

Species
- 17, see text

= Socalchemmis =

Genus of spiders

Socalchemmis is a genus of North American false wolf spiders that was first described by Norman I. Platnick & D. Ubick in 2001. The genus name comes from a shortening of the phrase "Southern Californian Chemmis", as the genus was discovered in California.

== Species ==
As of September 2019 it contains seventeen species, found in Mexico and the United States:

- Socalchemmis arroyoseco Platnick & Ubick, 2007 – USA
- Socalchemmis bixleri Platnick & Ubick, 2001 – USA
- Socalchemmis cajalco Platnick & Ubick, 2001 – USA
- Socalchemmis catavina Platnick & Ubick, 2001 – Mexico
- Socalchemmis cruz Platnick & Ubick, 2001 – USA
- Socalchemmis dolichopus (Chamberlin, 1919) (type) – USA
- Socalchemmis gertschi Platnick & Ubick, 2001 – USA
- Socalchemmis icenoglei Platnick & Ubick, 2001 – USA
- Socalchemmis idyllwild Platnick & Ubick, 2001 – USA
- Socalchemmis kastoni Platnick & Ubick, 2001 – USA, Mexico
- Socalchemmis miramar Platnick & Ubick, 2001 – USA
- Socalchemmis monterey Platnick & Ubick, 2001 – USA
- Socalchemmis palomar Platnick & Ubick, 2001 – USA
- Socalchemmis prenticei Platnick & Ubick, 2001 – USA
- Socalchemmis rothi Platnick & Ubick, 2001 – Mexico
- Socalchemmis shantzi Platnick & Ubick, 2001 – USA
- Socalchemmis williamsi Platnick & Ubick, 2001 – Mexico
