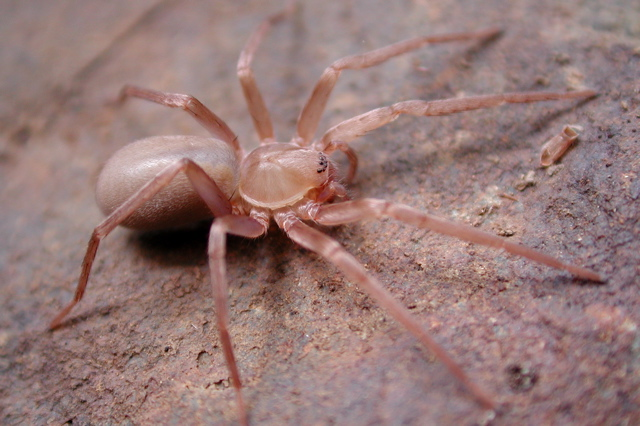
- Titiotus sp.

Scientific classification
- Kingdom: Animalia
- Phylum: Arthropoda
- Subphylum: Chelicerata
- Class: Arachnida
- Order: Araneae
- Infraorder: Araneomorphae
- Family: Zoropsidae
- Genus: Titiotus; Simon, 1897

Type species
- T. californicus Simon, 1897

Species
- 16, see text

= Titiotus =

Genus of spiders

Titiotus is a genus of American false wolf spiders that was first described by Eugène Louis Simon in 1897.

Spiders in this genus are often misidentified as the brown recluse spider of the genus Loxosceles due to similarities of coloration, body proportions, leg length, and even leg positioning prior to movement. Species within the genus Titiotus are "all found within California (United States), often in areas of dense human population." "They are most common from the northernmost portions of the state to the southern portions just north of the mountains near Los Angeles Basin. They are often found in redwood forests and present in cabins in the woods."

== Species ==
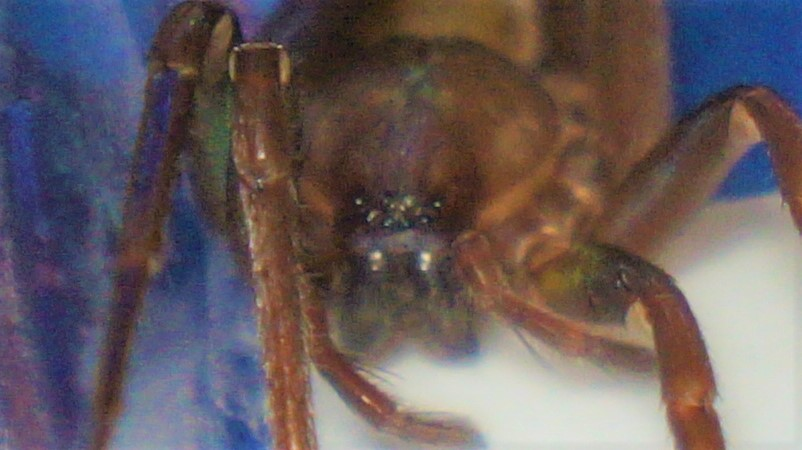
Eyes of a Titiotus sp.

As of September 2019 it contains sixteen species, found in the United States:

- Titiotus californicus Simon, 1897 (type) – USA
- Titiotus costa Platnick & Ubick, 2008 – USA
- Titiotus flavescens (Chamberlin & Ivie, 1941) – USA
- Titiotus fresno Platnick & Ubick, 2008 – USA
- Titiotus gertschi Platnick & Ubick, 2008 – USA
- Titiotus hansii (Schenkel, 1950) – USA
- Titiotus heberti Platnick & Ubick, 2008 – USA
- Titiotus humboldt Platnick & Ubick, 2008 – USA
- Titiotus icenoglei Platnick & Ubick, 2008 – USA
- Titiotus madera Platnick & Ubick, 2008 – USA
- Titiotus marin Platnick & Ubick, 2008 – USA
- Titiotus roadsend Platnick & Ubick, 2008 – USA
- Titiotus shantzi Platnick & Ubick, 2008 – USA
- Titiotus shasta Platnick & Ubick, 2008 – USA
- Titiotus tahoe Platnick & Ubick, 2008 – USA
- Titiotus tulare Platnick & Ubick, 2008 – USA
