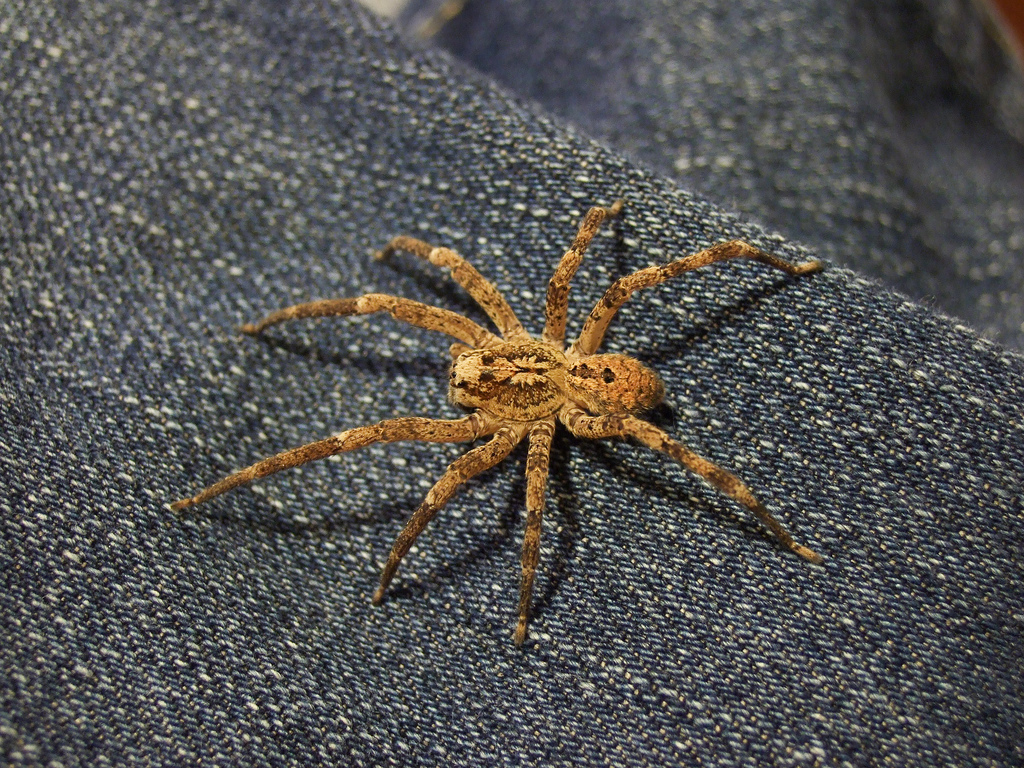
- Zoropsis spinimana
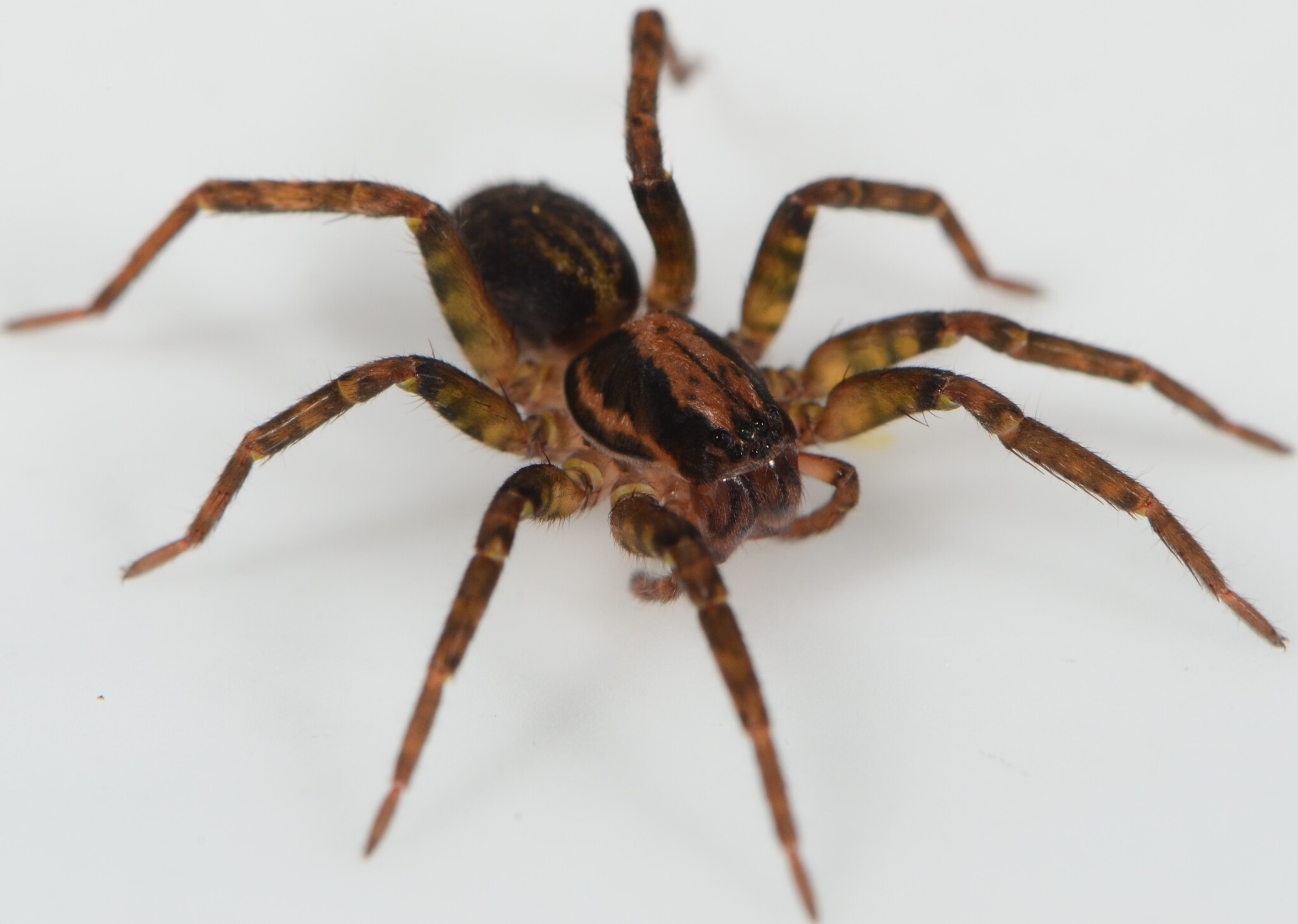
- Griswoldia urbensis

Scientific classification
- Kingdom: Animalia
- Phylum: Arthropoda
- Subphylum: Chelicerata
- Class: Arachnida
- Order: Araneae
- Infraorder: Araneomorphae
- Family: Zoropsidae; Bertkau, 1882

Diversity
- 28 genera, 186 species
- blue: reported countries (WSC) green: observation hotspots (iNaturalist)

= Zoropsidae =

False wolf spiders Temporal range: Palaeogene–present

Family of spiders

Zoropsidae, also known as false wolf spiders for their physical similarity to wolf spiders, is a family of cribellate araneomorph spiders first described by Philipp Bertkau in 1882. They can be distinguished from wolf spiders by their two rows of eyes that are more equal in size than those of Lycosidae.

The families Tengellidae and Zorocratidae are now included in Zoropsidae.

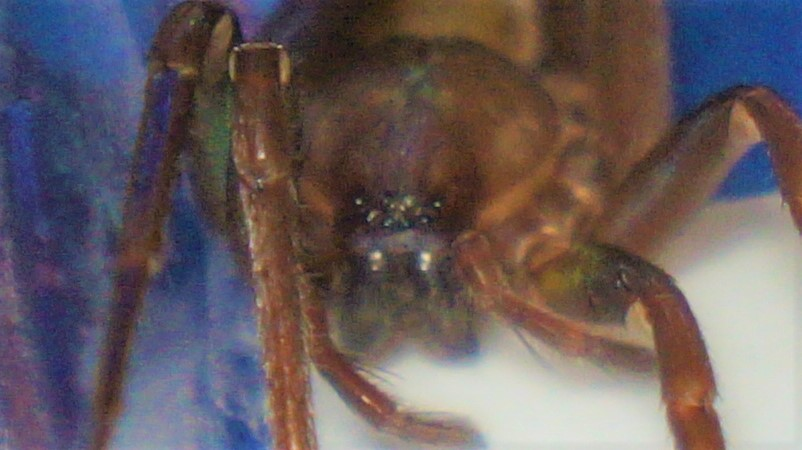
Eyes of a Titiotus sp.

== Genera ==
As of January 2026, this family includes 28 genera and 186 species:

- Akamasia Bosselaers, 2002 – Cyprus
- Anachemmis Chamberlin, 1919 – Mexico, United States
- Austrotengella Raven, 2012 – Australia
- Birrana Raven & Stumkat, 2005 – Australia
- Cauquenia Piacentini, Ramírez & Silva, 2013 – Chile
- Chinja Polotow & Griswold, 2018 – Tanzania
- Ciniflella Mello-Leitão, 1921 – Argentina, Brazil
- Devendra Lehtinen, 1967 – Sri Lanka
- Griswoldia Dippenaar-Schoeman & Jocqué, 1997 – South Africa
- Hoedillus Simon, 1898 – Guatemala, Nicaragua
- Huntia Gray & Thompson, 2001 – Australia
- Itatiaya Mello-Leitão, 1915 – Brazil
- Kilyana Raven & Stumkat, 2005 – Australia
- Krukt Raven & Stumkat, 2005 – Australia
- Lauricius Simon, 1888 – Mexico, United States
- Liocranoides Keyserling, 1881 – United States
- Megateg Raven & Stumkat, 2005 – Australia
- Pamiropsis Marusik & Fomichev, 2024 – Tajikistan
- Phanotea Simon, 1896 – South Africa
- Pseudoctenus Caporiacco, 1949 – Burundi, Kenya, Malawi
- Socalchemmis Platnick & Ubick, 2001 – Mexico, United States
- Takeoa Lehtinen, 1967 – China, Japan, Korea, Russia
- Tengella Dahl, 1901 – Nicaragua, Mexico
- Titiotus Simon, 1897 – United States
- Uliodon L. Koch, 1873 – New Zealand
- Wiltona Koçak & Kemal, 2008 – New Zealand
- Zorocrates Simon, 1888 – Mexico, United States, possibly Central America
- Zoropsis Simon, 1878 – Algeria, Morocco, Tunisia, Asia, Europe, North Africa, Western Mediterranean. Introduced to Azores, United States
