= List of Udubidae species =

This page lists all described species of the spider family Udubidae accepted by the World Spider Catalog as of January 2021: The four genera of Udubidae plus Zorocrates formerly made up the family Zorocratidae.

== Campostichomma ==
Campostichomma Karsch, 1892

- C. alawala Polotow & Griswold, 2017 — Sri Lanka
- C. harasbedda Polotow & Griswold, 2017 — Sri Lanka
- C. manicatum Karsch, 1892 (type) — Sri Lanka
- C. mudduk Polotow & Griswold, 2017 — Sri Lanka

== Raecius ==
Raecius Simon, 1892

- R. aculeatus Dahl, 1901 — Congo
- R. asper (Thorell, 1899) — Cameroon, Equatorial Guinea (Bioko)
- R. congoensis Griswold, 2002 — Congo
- R. crassipes (L. Koch, 1875) (type) — Ethiopia
- R. jocquei Griswold, 2002 — Ivory Coast
- R. scharffi Griswold, 2002 — Tanzania

== Uduba ==
Uduba Simon, 1880

- U. dahli Simon, 1903 — Madagascar
- U. evanescens (Dahl, 1901) — Madagascar
- U. madagascariensis (Vinson, 1863) (type) — Madagascar

== Zorodictyna ==
Zorodictyna Strand, 1907

- Z. inhonesta (Simon, 1906) (type) — Madagascar
- Z. oswaldi (Lenz, 1891) — Madagascar
