= List of Psechridae species =

This page lists all described species of the spider family Psechridae accepted by the World Spider Catalog as of December 2020:

== Fecenia ==
Fecenia

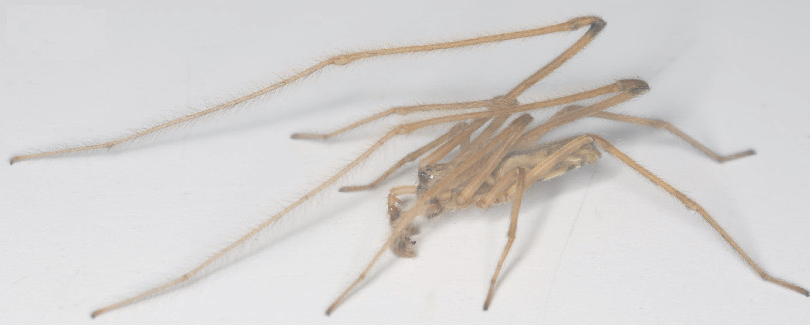
Fecenia cylindrata

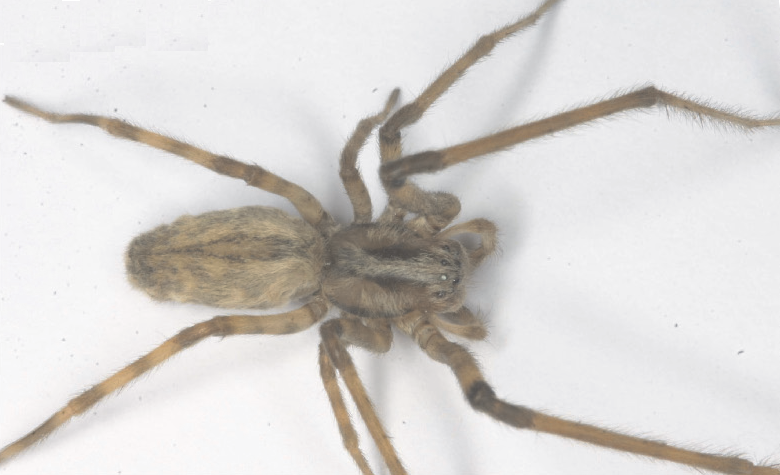
Fecenia protensa

Fecenia Simon, 1887

- F. cylindrata Thorell, 1895 — China, Myanmar, Thailand, Laos
- F. macilenta (Simon, 1885) — Malaysia, Indonesia (Sumatra)
- F. ochracea (Doleschall, 1859) (type) — Philippines to Australia (Queensland)
- F. protensa Thorell, 1891 — India (mainland, Nicobar Is.), Sri Lanka, Thailand, Vietnam, Malaysia, Singapore, Brunei, Indonesia (Sumatra, Borneo, Bali)

== Psechrus ==
Psechrus Thorell, 1878

- P. aluco Bayer, 2012 — Indonesia (Java)
- P. ampullaceus Bayer, 2014 — Vietnam
- P. ancoralis Bayer & Jäger, 2010 — Laos, Thailand
- P. annulatus Kulczyński, 1908 — Indonesia (Java)
- P. antraeus Bayer & Jäger, 2010 — Laos
- P. arcuatus Bayer, 2012 — Indonesia (Sumatra)
- P. argentatus (Doleschall, 1857) (type) — Indonesia (Sulawesi) to Australia (Queensland)
- P. arietinus Bayer, 2014 — Vietnam
- P. borneo Levi, 1982 — Borneo
- P. cebu Murphy, 1986 — Philippines
- P. changminae Feng, Zhang, Wu, Ma, T. B. Yang, Li & Z. Z. Yang, 2016 — China
- P. clavis Bayer, 2012 — Taiwan
- P. conicus Feng, Zhang, Wu, Ma, T. B. Yang, Li & Z. Z. Yang, 2016 — China
- P. crepido Bayer, 2012 — India
- P. decollatus Bayer, 2012 — Indonesia (Java)
- P. demiror Bayer, 2012 — Vietnam, Cambodia, and/or Laos
- P. discoideus Feng, Zhang, Wu, Ma, T. B. Yang, Li & Z. Z. Yang, 2016 — China
- P. elachys Bayer, 2012 — Thailand
- P. fuscai Bayer, 2012 — China
- P. ghecuanus Thorell, 1897 — Myanmar, Thailand, Laos, China
- P. hartmanni Bayer, 2012 — Sri Lanka
- P. himalayanus Simon, 1906 — India, Nepal, Bhutan
- P. huberi Bayer, 2014 — Philippines
- P. inflatus Bayer, 2012 — India, China
- P. insulanus Bayer, 2014 — Thailand
- P. jaegeri Bayer, 2012 — Thailand, Laos
- P. jinggangensis Wang & Yin, 2001 — China
- P. kenting Yoshida, 2009 — Taiwan
- P. khammouan Jäger, 2007 — Laos
- P. kinabalu Levi, 1982 — Borneo
- P. kunmingensis Yin, Wang & Zhang, 1985 — China
- P. laos Bayer, 2012 — Laos
- P. libelti Kulczyński, 1908 — Thailand to Indonesia (Borneo)
- P. luangprabang Jäger, 2007 — Laos
- P. marsyandi Levi, 1982 — Nepal
- P. mulu Levi, 1982 — Borneo
- P. norops Bayer, 2012 — Malaysia
- P. obtectus Bayer, 2012 — Vietnam
- P. omistes Bayer, 2014 — Indonesia (Sumatra)
- P. pakawini Bayer, 2012 — Myanmar, Thailand
- P. quasillus Bayer, 2014 — Borneo
- P. rani Wang & Yin, 2001 — China, Vietnam
- P. schwendingeri Bayer, 2012 — Philippines
- P. senoculatus Yin, Wang & Zhang, 1985 — China
- P. sinensis Berland & Berland, 1914 — China
- P. singaporensis Thorell, 1894 — Malaysia, Singapore, Indonesia (Sumatra)
- P. spatulatus Feng, Zhang, Wu, Ma, T. B. Yang, Li & Z. Z. Yang, 2016 — China
- P. steineri Bayer & Jäger, 2010 — Laos
- P. taiwanensis Wang & Yin, 2001 — Taiwan
- P. tauricornis Bayer, 2012 — Sri Lanka
- P. tingpingensis Yin, Wang & Zhang, 1985 — China
- P. torvus (O. Pickard-Cambridge, 1869) — Sri Lanka, India
- P. triangulus Yang, Zhang, Zhu & Song, 2003 — China
- P. ulcus Bayer, 2012 — Borneo
- P. vivax Bayer, 2012 — Thailand
- P. wade Bayer, 2014 — Philippines
- P. zygon Bayer, 2012 — Sri Lanka
