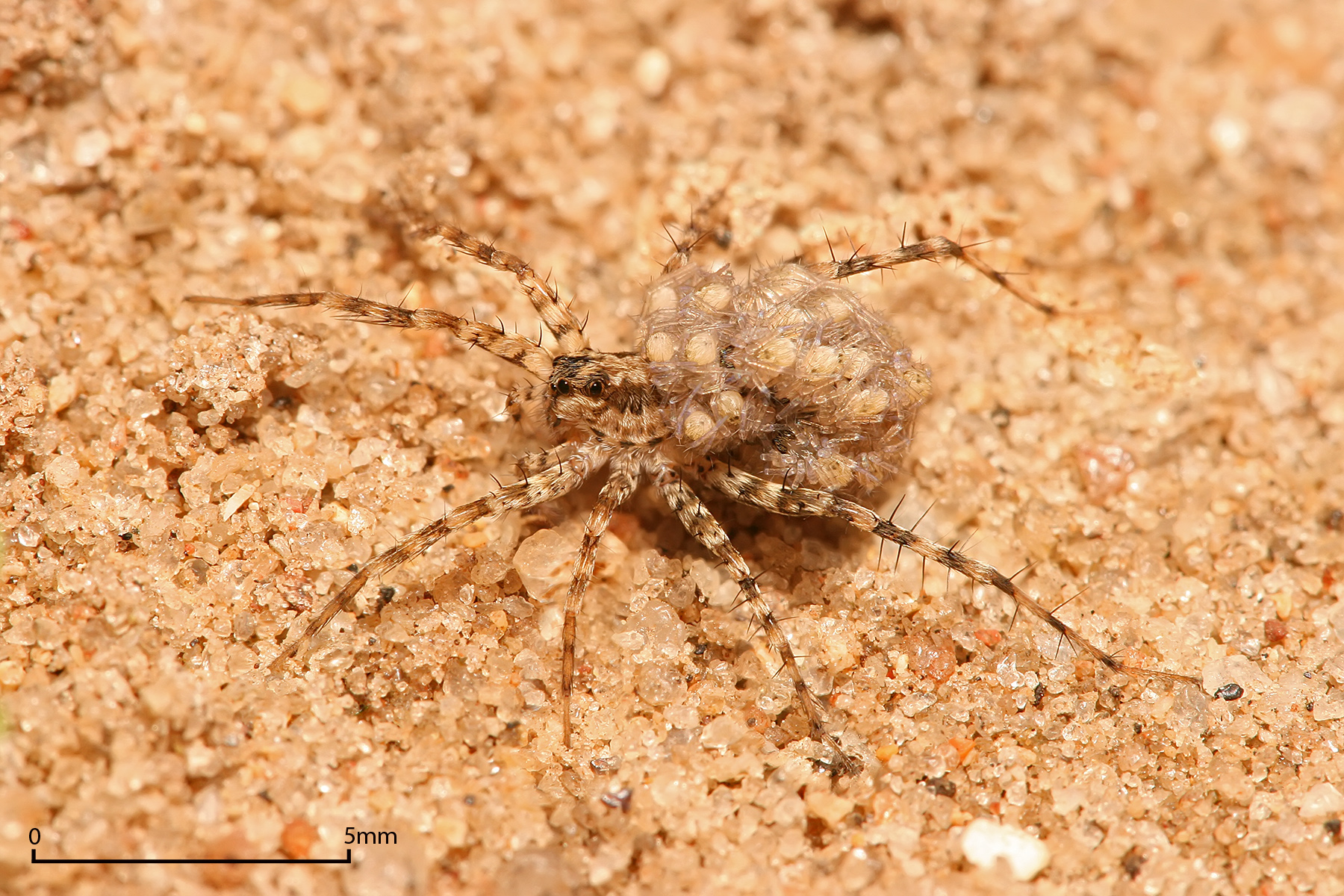
- Wolf spider carrying young

Scientific classification
- Domain: Eukaryota
- Kingdom: Animalia
- Phylum: Arthropoda
- Subphylum: Chelicerata
- Class: Arachnida
- Order: Araneae
- Infraorder: Araneomorphae
- Clade: Entelegynae
- Superfamily: Lycosoidea

Families
- See text.

= Lycosoidea =

Superfamily of spiders

Lycosoidea is a clade or superfamily of araneomorph spiders. The traditional circumscription was based on a feature of the eyes. The tapetum is a reflective layer at the back of the eye, thought to increase sensitivity in low light levels. Lycosoids were then defined by having a "grate-shaped" tapetum. Research from the late 1990s onwards suggests that this feature has evolved more than once, possibly as many as five times, so that the original Lycosoidea is paraphyletic. Studies published in 2014 and 2015 suggest that a smaller group of families does form a clade.

The reflective attributes of the tapeta vary significantly among lycosoid spiders.

== Phylogeny ==
The phylogeny of the Lycosoidea and related groups has been studied using both morphological and molecular data. Comparing these studies is complicated by the redrawing of family boundaries. Thus potential lycosoid genera placed in the family Miturgidae in 1993, such as Uliodon, have since been placed in the Zoropsidae. The family Ctenidae, placed in the Lycosoidea in many analyses, has been reduced by moving some genera into the new family Viridasiidae.

The "classical" circumscription of the Lycosoidea was based on the possession of a grate-shaped tapetum in some or all of the indirect eyes. In 1993, Griswold concluded that the Lycosoidea so defined was monophyletic, although some of the lycosoid families (as then circumscribed) were not. (See the table below for the families included in this and later studies.) Stiphidiidae was later excluded from the Lycosoidea. Later studies have recovered a version of Lycosoidea as a monophyletic group, although with varying compositions and placements within clades. Ramírez, as part of a study primarily directed at dionychans, suggested that a reduced Lycosoidea, consisting of only five families, was monophyletic. Ctenidae and Zoropsidae were excluded from the lycosoid clade. (Trechaleidae was not included in the study.) An alternative hypothesis explored by Ramírez also placed Thomisidae in the Lycosoidea. Polotow et al. (2015) concluded that a seven-family Lycosoidea was monophyletic. Of the "classical" lycosoid families, they put back Ctenidae left out by Ramírez (although saying that the family is not monophyletic), but additionally excluded Senoculidae. They supported Ramírez' alternative of placing Thomisidae in Lycosoidea.

Some circumscriptions of Lycosoidea
Family	Griswold (1993)	Ramírez (2014)	Polotow et al. (2015)
Ctenidae	yes	–	yes
Lycosidae	yes	yes	yes
Oxyopidae	yes	yes	yes
Pisauridae	yes	yes	yes
Psechridae	yes	yes	yes
Senoculidae	yes	yes	–
Stiphidiidae	yes	–	–
Thomisidae	–	?	yes
Trechaleidae	yes	*	yes
Zoropsidae	yes**	–	–
* Not included in the study. ** Some genera included were then placed in Miturgidae.

Lycosoid families are located within the large RTA clade of araneomorph spiders. Within this clade, Polotow et al. place them within a "grate-shaped tapetum clade", with the family Zoropsidae as their sister:

- RTA clade
  - basal groups
  - - Dionycha
    - Oval calamistrum clade
      - Udubidae
      - Grate‑shaped tapetum clade
        - Lycosoidea
        - Zoropsidae

== Bibliography ==
- Polotow, Daniele; Carmichael, Anthea & Griswold, Charles E. (2015). "Total evidence analysis of the phylogenetic relationships of Lycosoidea spiders (Araneae, Entelegynae)". Invertebrate Systematics. 29 (2): 124–163. doi:10.1071/IS14041.
- Ramírez, Martín J. (2014). The morphology and phylogeny of dionychan spiders (Araneae, Araneomorphae). Bulletin of the American Museum of Natural History. hdl:2246/6537.
