= Zorocratidae =

Family of spiders

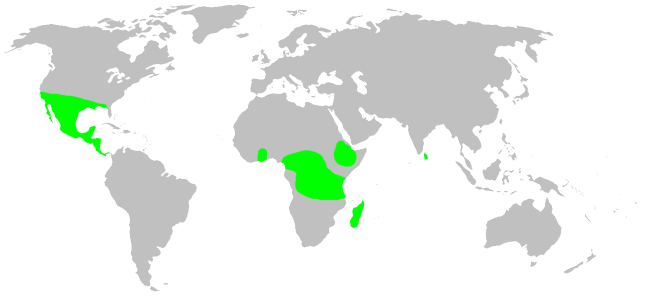
Distribution of former members of Zorocratidae

Zorocratidae is a formerly accepted family of spiders. Most of the genera formerly placed in this family have been transferred to the family Udubidae. The type genus, Zorocrates, is now placed in the Zoropsidae.

- Campostichomma Karsch, 1891 → Udubidae
- Raecius Simon, 1892 → Udubidae
- Uduba Simon, 1880 → Udubidae
- Zorocrates Simon, 1888 → Zoropsidae
- Zorodictyna Strand, 1907 → Udubidae
