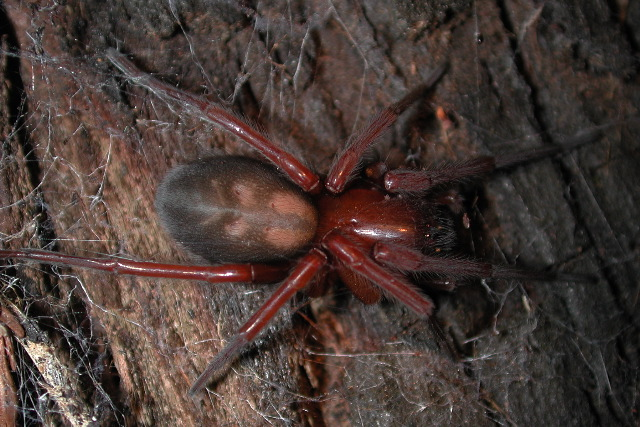
- Callobius sp., Amaurobiidae
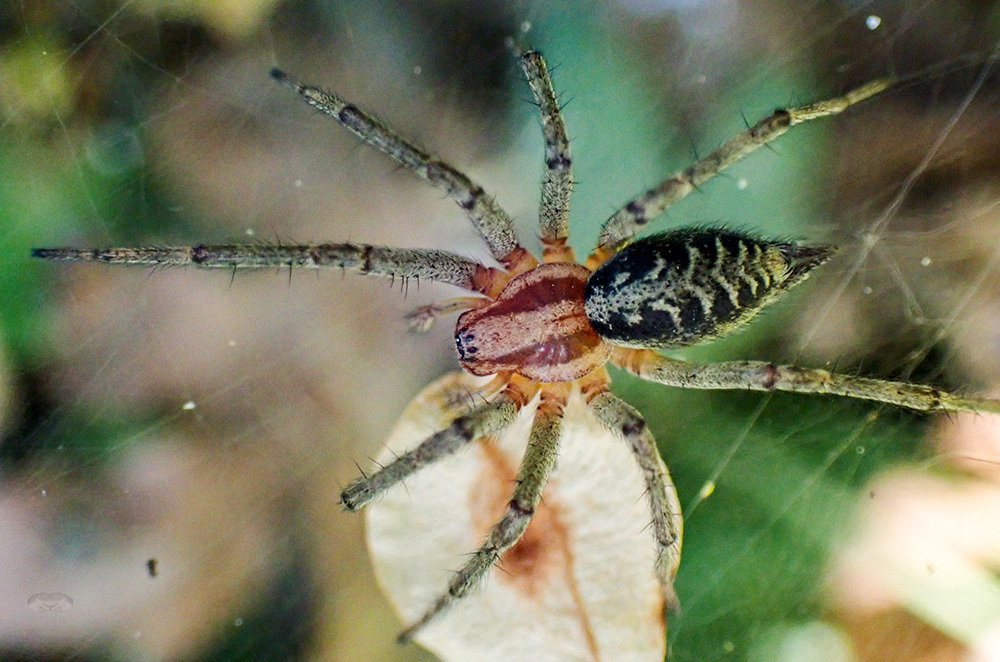
- Agelena sp., Agelenidae

Scientific classification
- Kingdom: Animalia
- Phylum: Arthropoda
- Subphylum: Chelicerata
- Class: Arachnida
- Order: Araneae
- Suborder: Opisthothelae
- Infraorder: Araneomorphae
- Clade: Entelegynae
- Clade: RTA clade
- Clade: Marronoid clade Wheeler et al., 2017

= Marronoid clade =

Clade of entelegyn spiders

Marronoid clade is a clade of entelegyn spiders classified within the RTA clade. The name "Marronoid clade" was proposed by Wheeler et al. in 2017. The name comes from the Spanish word for brown (marrón), emphasizing the brown coloration of most of its members. Families in this clade have been used as wastebin taxons and it is difficult to point out striking synapomorphies for the clade. All families in the clade have 3 tarsal claws; most families have members both with and without cribellum.

== Taxonomy ==
The clade consists of 13 families:

- Agelenidae
- Amaurobiidae
- Argyronetidae
- Cicurinidae
- Cybaeidae
- Cycloctenidae
- Desidae
- Dictynidae
- Hahniidae
- Lathyidae
- Macrobunidae
- Stiphidiidae
- Toxopidae

== Phylogeny ==
Phylogeny of the Marronoid clade based on Gorneau et al. 2023 with the taxonomical revisions proposed by Montana et al. 2025:

- Marronoid clade
  - Amaurobiidae
  - - Agelenidae
    - - - Cycloctenidae
        - - Aorangia incertae sedis
          - - Stiphidiidae
            - Desidae
      - - Macrobunidae
        - - Hahniidae
          - - Cybaeidae
            - - Cicurinidae
              - - Toxopidae
                - - - Dictynidae
                    - Argyronetidae
                  - Lathyidae

Phylogeny of the Marronoid clade based on Gorneau et al. 2023:

- Marronoid clade
  - Amaurobiidae
  - - Agelenidae
    - - - Cycloctenidae
        - - Aorangia incertae sedis
          - - Stiphidiidae
            - Desidae
      - - Macrobunidae
        - - Hahniidae
          - - Cybaeidae
            - - Cicurinidae
              - - Toxopidae
                - Dictynidae

Phylogeny of the Marronoid clade based on Kulkarni et al. 2023:

- Marronoid clade
  - Amaurobiidae I
  - - - Dictynidae I
      - Agelenidae
    - - - - - - Cycloctenidae I
              - Stiphidiidae I
            - Cycloctenidae II
          - - Stiphidiidae II
            - Desidae
      - - Amaurobiidae II
        - - - Toxopidae
            - Dictynidae II
          - - Hahniidae I
            - - Cybaeidae I
              - - Hahniidae II & III
                - Cybaeidae II

Phylogeny of the Marronoid clade based on Wheeler et al. 2017:

- Marronoid Clade
  - Amaurobiidae: Amaurobiinae
  - - - Agelenidae
      - - Amaurobiidae: Macrobuninae
        - - Cybaeidae
          - - Hahniidae
            - - Toxopidae
              - Dictynidae
    - - Cycloctenidae
      - - Stiphidiidae
        - Desidae

Marronoid clade in the phylogeny of the RTA clade, based on Kulkarni et al. 2023:

- RTA Clade
  - - Penestomidae
    - Zodariidae
  - - - Sparassidae
      - Marronoid Clade
    - - Homalonychidae
      - - Oval Calamistrum Clade
        - Dionycha Clade

Marronoid clade in the phylogeny of the RTA clade, based on Wheeler et al. 2017:

- RTA Clade
  - - Penestomidae
    - Zodariidae
  - - Marronoid Clade
    - - Sparassidae
      - - Homalonychidae
        - - Oval Calamistrum Clade
          - Dionycha Clade
