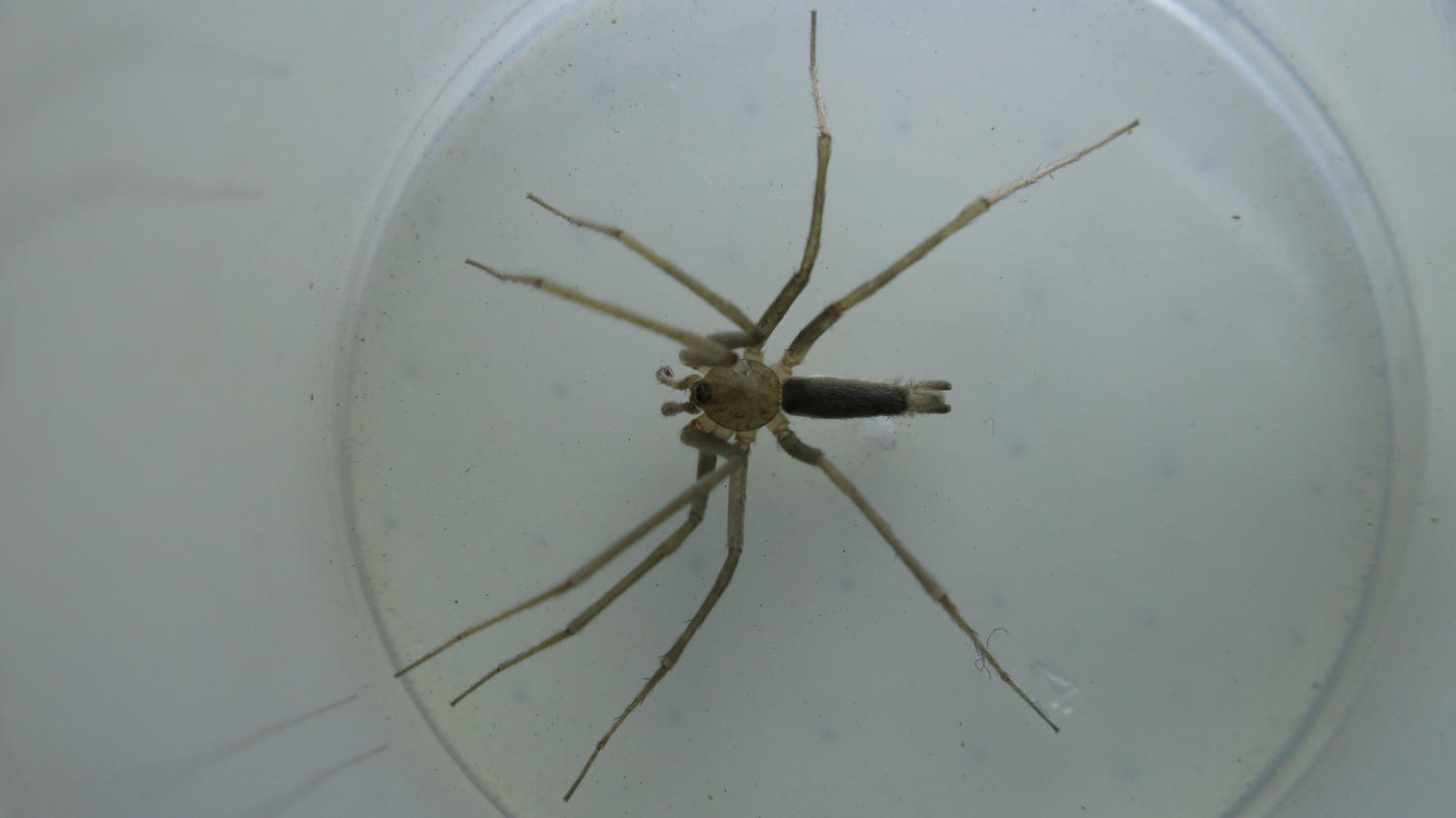
- from South Africa

Conservation status
- Data Deficient (IUCN 3.1)

Scientific classification
- Kingdom: Animalia
- Phylum: Arthropoda
- Subphylum: Chelicerata
- Class: Arachnida
- Order: Araneae
- Infraorder: Araneomorphae
- Family: Cithaeronidae
- Genus: Cithaeron
- Species: C. contentum

Binomial name
- Cithaeron contentum Jocqué & Russell-Smith, 2025

Synonyms
- Cithaeron contentum Jocqué & Russell-Smith, 2011 (nomen nudum)

= Cithaeron contentum =

Swift ground spider.

Species of spider

Cithaeron contentum is a species of spider in the family Cithaeronidae. It is endemic to South Africa.

== Taxonomy ==
The species was first described by Jocqué & Russell-Smith in 2011, but this original description lacked indication of a type repository, rendering it unavailable under the International Code of Zoological Nomenclature. The species was subsequently validly described by the same authors in 2025, with proper designation of the holotype repository.

== Etymology ==
The specific epithet contentum is derived from the Latin word contentus, meaning "happy".

== Distribution ==
Cithaeron contentum is known from two provinces in South Africa: Limpopo (Buzzard Mountain, Soutpansberg) and Mpumalanga (Blyde River Canyon Nature Reserve). The type locality is Blyde River Canyon Botanical Reserve in Mpumalanga.

== Habitat ==
Cithaeron contentum is a free-living, fast-moving ground spider found in the Savanna Biome. It occurs at elevations around 650–1598 metres above sea level.

== Description ==
The female has not been formally described. The male holotype has a total length of 6.67 mm. The first leg measures 15.08 mm in total length, while the fourth leg is 16.91 mm.

The male pedipalp features an elongate cymbium that tapers towards the tip. The retrolateral tibial apophysis is bifid (split into two branches), with the upper branch pointed and the lower branch rounded at the tip. The embolus is notably elongated, with the distal two-thirds free from the bulb. The median apophysis has two distinct lobes: a ventral lobe that is tongue-shaped and translucent, and a dorsal lobe with a two-pointed notch at the tip.

Cithaeron contentum can be distinguished from the closely related C. delimbatus Strand, 1906 by its rigid retrolateral tibial apophysis, elongate embolus that is not held closely to the bulb, and its bilobed median apophysis.

== Conservation status ==
The species is classified as Data Deficient due to limited collection data. While it has a very restricted known range, it is suspected that additional localities exist but require more extensive sampling to determine the species' true distribution. The species is protected within the Blyde River Canyon Nature Reserve.
