= Inthaeron rossi =

Scientific classification
- Kingdom: Animalia
- Phylum: Arthropoda
- Subphylum: Chelicerata
- Class: Arachnida
- Order: Araneae
- Infraorder: Araneomorphae
- Family: Cithaeronidae
- Genus: Inthaeron
- Species: I. rossi

Binomial name
- Inthaeron rossi Platnick, 1991

Species of spider

Inthaeron rossi is a species of araneomorph spider endemic to India in the family Cithaeronidae, that was described by Norman I. Platnick in 1991.

== Description ==
They are generally around 7 millimetres (0.28 in) long and 2 millimetres (0.079 in) wide. They have a greenish-brown cephalothorax and yellowish-brown legs. Their abdomen is about twice as long as the carapace, and is mostly light brown and hairy with several stripes of various colors. Only the female characters were known until 1994, when a male specimen was finally captured and identified, bearing the distinctive, highly coiled embolus. The species name is derived from one of the specimen's collectors.

== Distribution ==
It was initially found in Mahabaleshwar, Maharashtra, India, though it has also been found in Betul, Madhya Pradesh.
