= S. darwini =

S. darwini may refer to:

- Sapphirina darwini
- Scenopinus darwini
- Scolytogenes darwini
- Scolytomimus darwini
- Semicossyphus darwini
- Semiformiceras darwini, an ammonite species in the genus Semiformiceras marking a zone in the Tithonian stage of the Jurassic period
- Senoculus darwini, a spider species found in Argentina
- Spurlingia darwini
- Stenaelurillus darwini, a jumping spider species found in Tanzania
- Stenoconchyoptera darwini
- Stylatula darwini
- Szuletaia darwini

== See also ==
- S. darwinii (disambiguation)
- Darwini (disambiguation)
