= Zorascar =

Scientific classification
- Kingdom: Animalia
- Phylum: Arthropoda
- Subphylum: Chelicerata
- Class: Arachnida
- Order: Araneae
- Infraorder: Araneomorphae
- Family: Udubidae
- Genus: Zorascar; Henrard, Griswold & Jocqué, 2024

Type species
- Z. pasunepipe Henrard, Griswold & Jocqué, 2024

Species
- 2, see text

Genus of spiders

Zorascar is a genus of spiders in the family Udubidae.

== Distribution ==
Zorascar is endemic to Madagascar.

== Etymology ==
The genus name combines the related genus Zorodictyna and "Madagascar".

Z pasunepipe refers to the René Magritte painting The Treachery of Images ("Ceci n'est pas une pipe"). Likewise, Z. pasunepomme "Ceci n'est pas une pomme", referring to pipe- and apple-shaped anatomical features.

== Species ==
As of January 2026, this genus includes two species:

- Zorascar pasunepipe Henrard, Griswold & Jocqué, 2024 – Madagascar
- Zorascar pasunepomme Henrard, Griswold & Jocqué, 2024 – Madagascar
