= Inthaeron =

Scientific classification
- Kingdom: Animalia
- Phylum: Arthropoda
- Subphylum: Chelicerata
- Class: Arachnida
- Order: Araneae
- Infraorder: Araneomorphae
- Family: Cithaeronidae
- Genus: Inthaeron; Platnick, 1991

Type species
- Inthaeron rossi Platnick, 1991

Species
- See text

Genus of spiders

Inthaeron is a genus of Asian araneomorph spiders in the family Cithaeronidae, containing only two species. It was first described by Norman I. Platnick in 1991, and has only been found in India. Females can be distinguished from those of its sister genus, Cithaeron, by the arrangement of cylindrical gland spigots on the posterior median spinnerets, appearing in two rows rather than in clusters. The name is derived from "India", the country it was first found in, and "Cithaeron", the name of the other genus of Cithaeronidae.

== Species ==
- Inthaeron longipes (Gravely, 1931) – India
- Inthaeron rossi Platnick, 1991 (type) – India
