= Zorodictyna oswaldi =

Scientific classification
- Domain: Eukaryota
- Kingdom: Animalia
- Phylum: Arthropoda
- Subphylum: Chelicerata
- Class: Arachnida
- Order: Araneae
- Infraorder: Araneomorphae
- Family: Udubidae
- Genus: Zorodictyna
- Species: Z. oswaldi

Binomial name
- Zorodictyna oswaldi (Lenz, 1891)

Synonyms
- Agroeca oswaldi Lenz, 1891; Uliodon oswaldi Strand, 1908

Species of spider

Zorodictyna oswaldi is a species of spider in the family Udubidae, found in Madagascar. It was first described in 1891 by Heinrich Lenz as Agroeca oswaldi. The species name honours Albert O'Swald whose collection had been given to Lenz; the name was originally written o'swaldi. In 1908 Embrik Strand placed it in the genus Uliodon; in 1967 Pekka T. Lehtinen transferred it to Zorodictyna.

The cephalothorax is reddish brown, without any particular markings; the legs are similarly coloured. It is rounded in shape, somewhat truncated at the front with the head slightly offset. The upper side of the oval abdomen is pale gray, hairy, with dark longitudinal lines and interlocking irregular patches. Males have a body about 13 mm long, females about 19 mm long.
