= Zorodictyna inhonesta =

Scientific classification
- Kingdom: Animalia
- Phylum: Arthropoda
- Subphylum: Chelicerata
- Class: Arachnida
- Order: Araneae
- Infraorder: Araneomorphae
- Family: Udubidae
- Genus: Zorodictyna
- Species: Z. inhonesta

Binomial name
- Zorodictyna inhonesta (Simon, 1906)

Synonyms
- Uduba inhonesta Simon, 1906; Zorodictyna intermedia Strand, 1907

Species of spider

Zorodictyna inhonesta is a species of spider in the family Udubidae, found in Madagascar. It was first described by Eugène Simon in 1906 as Uduba inhonesta. Pekka T. Lehtinen transferred it to the genus Zorodictyna in 1967, although Pierre L.G. Benoit was still using the name Uduba inhonesta in 1972.

Under the synonym Zorodictyna intermedia, a female was described as having a bright red cephalothorax, darker towards the front. The upper surface of abdomen was brown freckled with darker spots, with two parallel lighter stripes. Its total length was at least 16 mm. The fourth leg was longest, at 22 mm.
