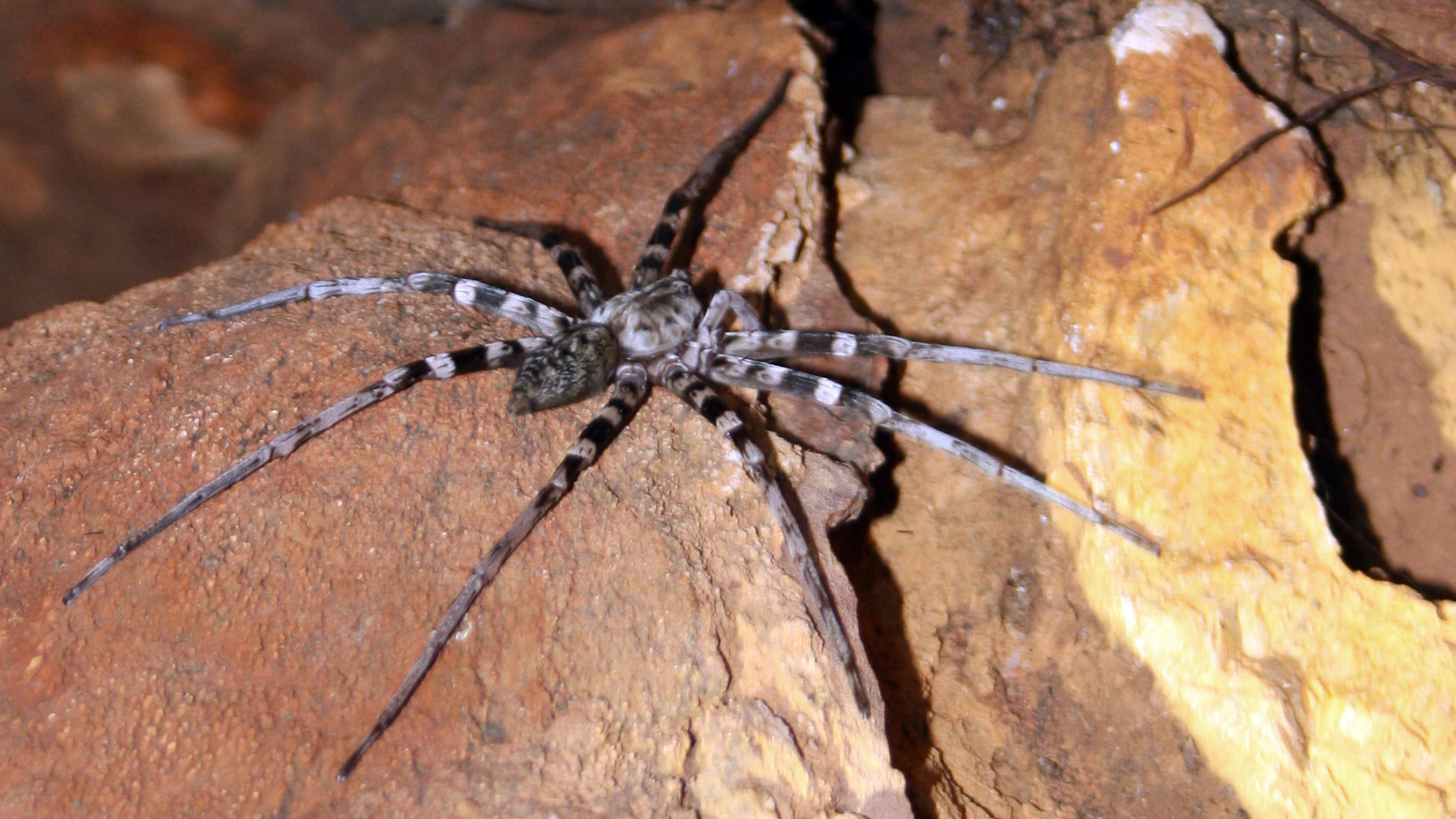
- Zebra Spider (V. fasciatus)

Scientific classification
- Kingdom: Animalia
- Phylum: Arthropoda
- Subphylum: Chelicerata
- Class: Arachnida
- Order: Araneae
- Infraorder: Araneomorphae
- Family: Viridasiidae
- Genus: Viridasius; Simon, 1889
- Species: V. fasciatus

Binomial name
- Viridasius fasciatus (Lenz, 1886)

Synonyms
- Phoneutria fasciata Lenz, 1886; Viridasius pulchripes Simon, 1889; Vulsor fasciatus Lehtinen, 1967

= Viridasius =

Genus of spiders

Viridasius is a monotypic genus of East African araneomorph spiders in the family Viridasiidae, containing the single species, Viridasius fasciatus. It was first described by Eugène Simon in 1889, and has only been found in Madagascar.

== Description ==
These spiders have a white carapace with black spots, and long black and white striped legs. Females can grow up to 2 to 2.5 centimetres (0.79 to 0.98 in) long, but the males are generally smaller.

== Taxonomy ==
The male and female holotypes were originally identified as Phoneutria fasciata when they were first described by Lenz in 1886. In 1889, Eugène Simon described and identified a male as P. pulchripes, placing it in the new genus Viridasius in the Ctenidae. In the same work, Simon described the genus Vulsor, which he would later merge with this one. He renamed the single species Vulsor fasciatus, retaining the species name Lenz gave in the original description. In 1967, Pekka T. Lehtinen reorganized the Araneomorphae, re-separating Viridasius from Vulsor. In 2015, the genus was moved from the Ctenidae to the newly created Viridasiidae
