= Psechrus torvus =

Scientific classification
- Kingdom: Animalia
- Phylum: Arthropoda
- Subphylum: Chelicerata
- Class: Arachnida
- Order: Araneae
- Infraorder: Araneomorphae
- Family: Psechridae
- Genus: Psechrus
- Species: P. torvus

Binomial name
- Psechrus torvus (O. Pickard-Cambridge, 1869)

Species of spider

Psechrus torvus is a species of spider of the genus Psechrus. It is native to India and Sri Lanka.
