= Vulsor =

Scientific classification
- Kingdom: Animalia
- Phylum: Arthropoda
- Subphylum: Chelicerata
- Class: Arachnida
- Order: Araneae
- Infraorder: Araneomorphae
- Family: Viridasiidae
- Genus: Vulsor; Simon, 1889

Type species
- V. bidens Simon, 1889

Species
- 8, see text

Genus of spiders

Vulsor is a genus of araneomorph spiders in the family Viridasiidae, first described by Eugène Simon in 1889. Originally placed with the wandering spiders, it was moved to the Viridasiidae in 2015.

== Species ==
As of April 2019 it contains eight species:

- Vulsor bidens Simon, 1889 (type) – Comoros, Mayotte
- Vulsor isaloensis (Ono, 1993) – Madagascar
- Vulsor occidentalis Mello-Leitão, 1922 – Brazil
- Vulsor penicillatus Simon, 1896 – Madagascar
- Vulsor quartus Strand, 1907 – Madagascar
- Vulsor quintus Strand, 1907 – Madagascar
- Vulsor septimus Strand, 1907 – Madagascar
- Vulsor sextus Strand, 1907 – Madagascar

== See also ==
- Viridasius
