= S. darwinii =

S. darwinii may refer to:

- Sapphirina darwinii, a species of parasitic copepod
- Senecio darwinii, a plant species

== See also ==
- S. darwini (disambiguation)
- Darwinii (disambiguation)
