= Psechrus hartmanni =

Scientific classification
- Kingdom: Animalia
- Phylum: Arthropoda
- Subphylum: Chelicerata
- Class: Arachnida
- Order: Araneae
- Infraorder: Araneomorphae
- Family: Psechridae
- Genus: Psechrus
- Species: P. hartmanni

Binomial name
- Psechrus hartmanni Bayer, 2012

Species of spider

Psechrus hartmanni, is a species of spider of the genus Psechrus. It is endemic to Sri Lanka.
