= Campostichomma manicatum =

Scientific classification
- Kingdom: Animalia
- Phylum: Arthropoda
- Subphylum: Chelicerata
- Class: Arachnida
- Order: Araneae
- Infraorder: Araneomorphae
- Family: Udubidae
- Genus: Campostichomma
- Species: C. manicatum

Binomial name
- Campostichomma manicatum Karsch, 1892

Species of spider

Campostichomma manicatum is a species of spider in the family Udubidae, found in Sri Lanka.
