= Tabiboka =

Scientific classification
- Kingdom: Animalia
- Phylum: Arthropoda
- Subphylum: Chelicerata
- Class: Arachnida
- Order: Araneae
- Infraorder: Araneomorphae
- Family: Udubidae
- Genus: Tabiboka; Henrard, Griswold & Jocqué, 2024

Type species
- T. milleri Henrard, Griswold & Jocqué, 2024

Species
- 3, see text

Genus of spiders

Tabiboka is a genus of spiders in the family Udubidae.

== Distribution ==
Tabiboka is endemic to Madagascar.

== Etymology ==
The species are named in honor of Jeremy Miller, French arachnologist Jacques Millot, (1897–1980), and Brazilian arachnologist Daniele Polotow.

== Species ==
As of January 2026, this genus includes three species:

- Tabiboka milleri Henrard, Griswold & Jocqué, 2024 – Madagascar
- Tabiboka milloti Henrard, Griswold & Jocqué, 2024 – Madagascar
- Tabiboka polotowae Henrard, Griswold & Jocqué, 2024 – Madagascar
