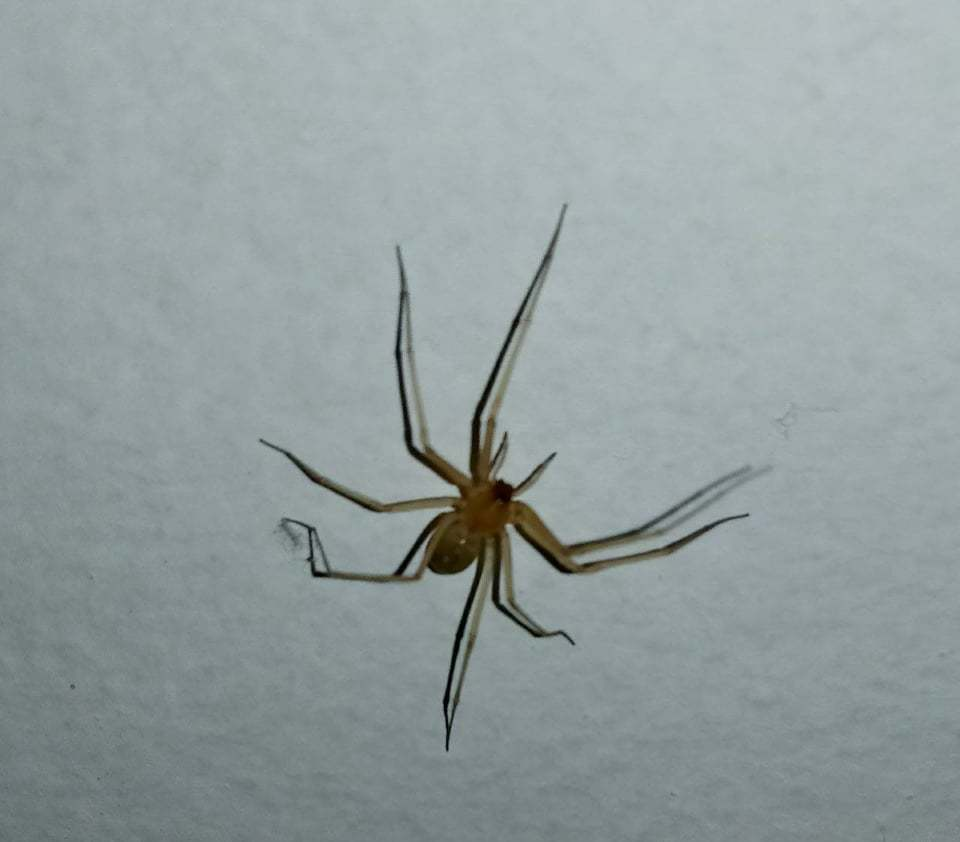

Scientific classification
- Kingdom: Animalia
- Phylum: Arthropoda
- Subphylum: Chelicerata
- Class: Arachnida
- Order: Araneae
- Infraorder: Araneomorphae
- Family: Cithaeronidae
- Genus: Cithaeron
- Species: C. praedonius

Binomial name
- Cithaeron praedonius O. P.-Cambridge, 1872

= Cithaeron praedonius =

Species of spider

Cithaeron praedonius is a species of true spider in the family Cithaeronidae. It is found in North Africa, Greece, Cyprus, Turkey, India, and Malaysia, and has been introduced into Brazil, Cuba, America, and Australia.
