= Senoculus maronicus =

Scientific classification
- Domain: Eukaryota
- Kingdom: Animalia
- Phylum: Arthropoda
- Subphylum: Chelicerata
- Class: Arachnida
- Order: Araneae
- Infraorder: Araneomorphae
- Family: Senoculidae
- Genus: Senoculus
- Species: S. maronicus

Binomial name
- Senoculus maronicus Taczanowski, 1872

Species of spider

Senoculus maronicus is a species of spider found in French Guiana.

== See also ==
- List of Senoculidae species
