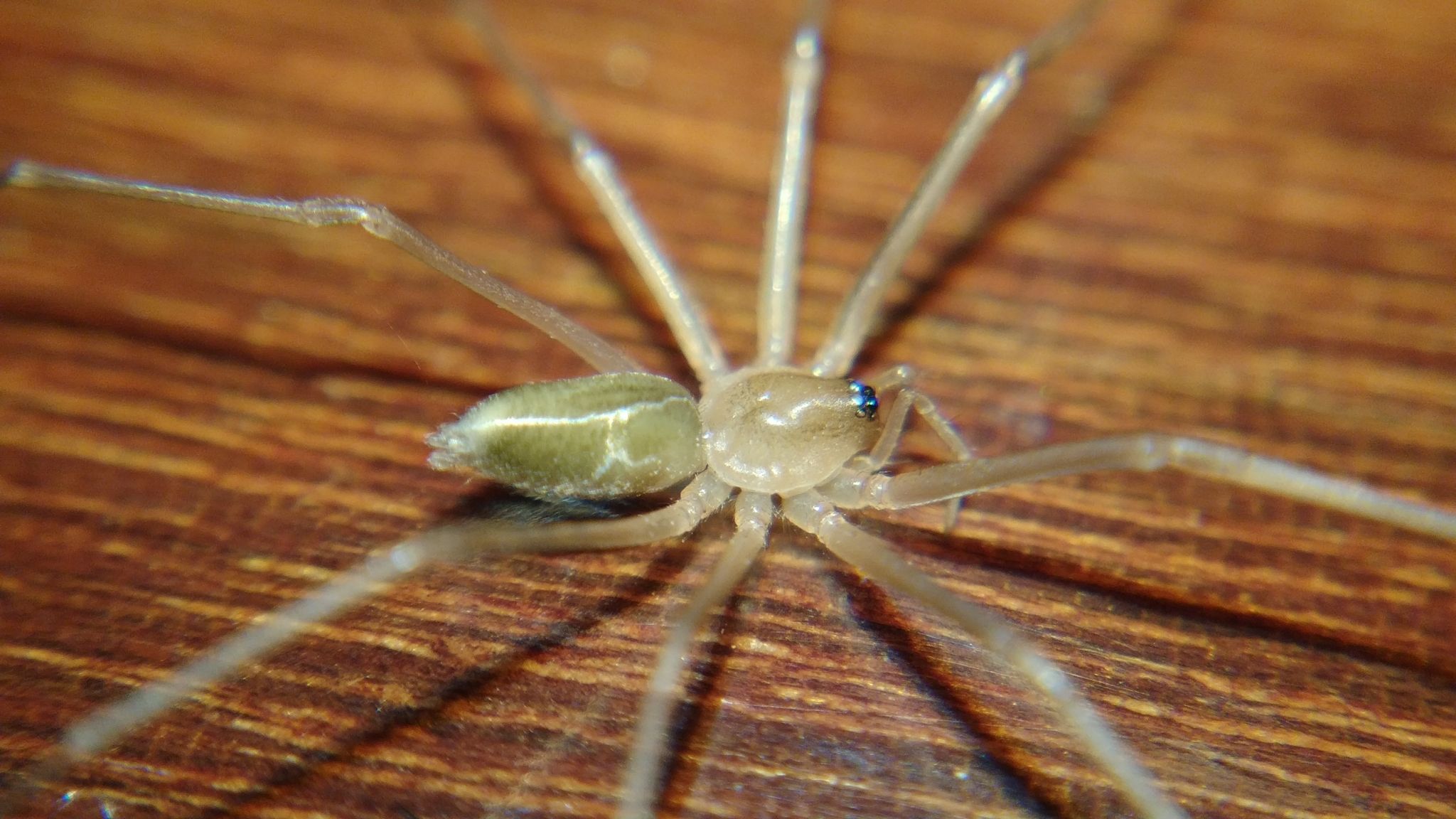
- C. praedonius from Thailand
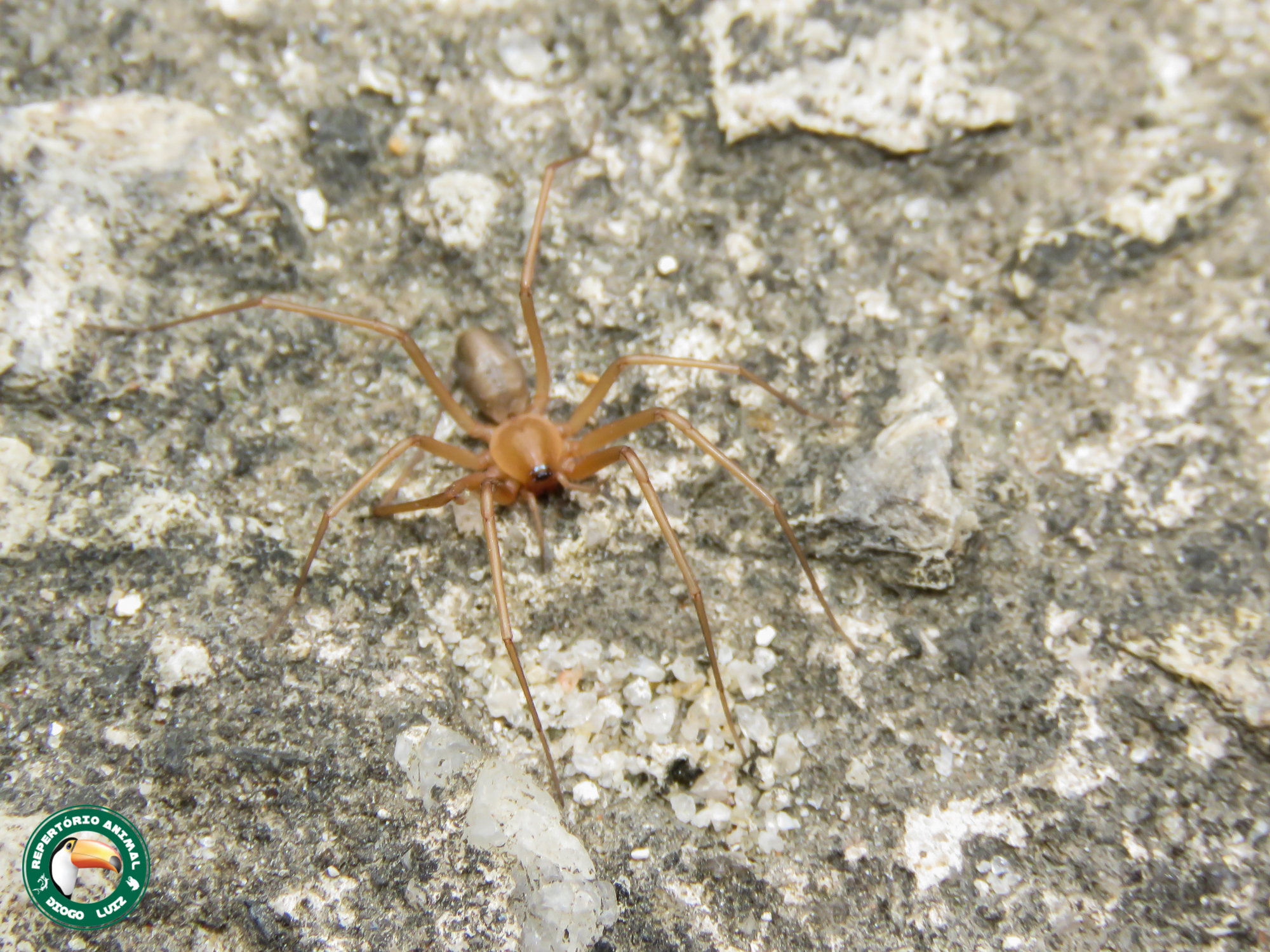
- C. reimoseri from Brazil

Scientific classification
- Kingdom: Animalia
- Phylum: Arthropoda
- Subphylum: Chelicerata
- Class: Arachnida
- Order: Araneae
- Infraorder: Araneomorphae
- Family: Cithaeronidae
- Genus: Cithaeron; O. Pickard-Cambridge, 1872

Type species
- C. praedonius O. Pickard-Cambridge, 1872

Species
- 7, see text

= Cithaeron (spider) =

Genus of spiders

Cithaeron is a genus of araneomorph spiders in the family Cithaeronidae, first described by O. Pickard-Cambridge in 1872.

== Species ==
As of September 2025 it contains seven species:

- Cithaeron contentum Jocqué & Russell-Smith, 2011 – South Africa
- Cithaeron delimbatus Strand, 1906 – East Africa
- Cithaeron dippenaarae Bosmans & Van Keer, 2015 – Morocco
- Cithaeron indicus Platnick & Gajbe, 1994 – India
- Cithaeron jocqueorum Platnick, 1991 – Ivory Coast
- C. persicus Zamani & Marusik, 2025 — Iran
- Cithaeron praedonius O. Pickard-Cambridge, 1872 (type) – North Africa, Greece, Turkey, Middle East to India, Malaysia. Introduced to Brazil, Cuba, Australia, United States
- Cithaeron reimoseri Platnick, 1991 – Eritrea, Brazil (probably introduced)
