= Udubidae =

Scientific classification
- Kingdom: Animalia
- Phylum: Arthropoda
- Subphylum: Chelicerata
- Class: Arachnida
- Order: Araneae
- Infraorder: Araneomorphae
- Family: Udubidae; Griswold & Polotow, 2015

Diversity
- 6 genera, 58 species
- blue: reported countries (WSC)

Family of spiders

Udubidae is a family of araneomorph spiders, most of whose members were formerly placed in the family Zorocratidae, which is no longer accepted.

== Phylogeny ==
A study investigating the phylogenetic relationships of lycosoid spiders concluded that the genera formerly placed in the family Zorocratidae fell into two groups. The largest group formed the sister clade to the "grate-shaped tapetum clade" (see the cladogram below). The type genus, Zorocrates, grouped with Zoropsis inside the grate-shaped tapetum clade. Some earlier studies had also cast doubt on the monophyly of the Zorocratidae. A 2003 study found that Raecius, Uduba, and Zorodictyna formed a clade somewhat separated from Zorocrates. A 2014 study including Zorocrates and Raecius did not find that they grouped together.

Moving the type genus to a different family meant that a new family name was needed for the remaining members. Griswold and Polotow proposed "Udubidae", with the type genus Uduba. As of 2026, the World Spider Catalog accepts this family. A summary phylogeny is shown below.

- RTA clade
  - basal groups
  - - Dionycha
    - Oval calamistrum clade
      - Udubidae (including Raecius, Uduba & Zorodictyna)
      - Grate‑shaped tapetum clade
        - Lycosoidea
        - Zoropsidae (including Zorocrates)

(Shading marks genera formerly placed in Zorocratidae.)

== Genera ==
As of January 2026, this family includes six genera and 58 species:

- Campostichomma Karsch, 1892 – Sri Lanka
- Raecius Simon, 1892 – Africa
- Tabiboka Henrard, Griswold & Jocqué, 2024 – Madagascar
- Uduba Simon, 1880 – Madagascar
- Zorascar Henrard, Griswold & Jocqué, 2024 – Madagascar
- Zorodictyna Strand, 1907 – Madagascar
