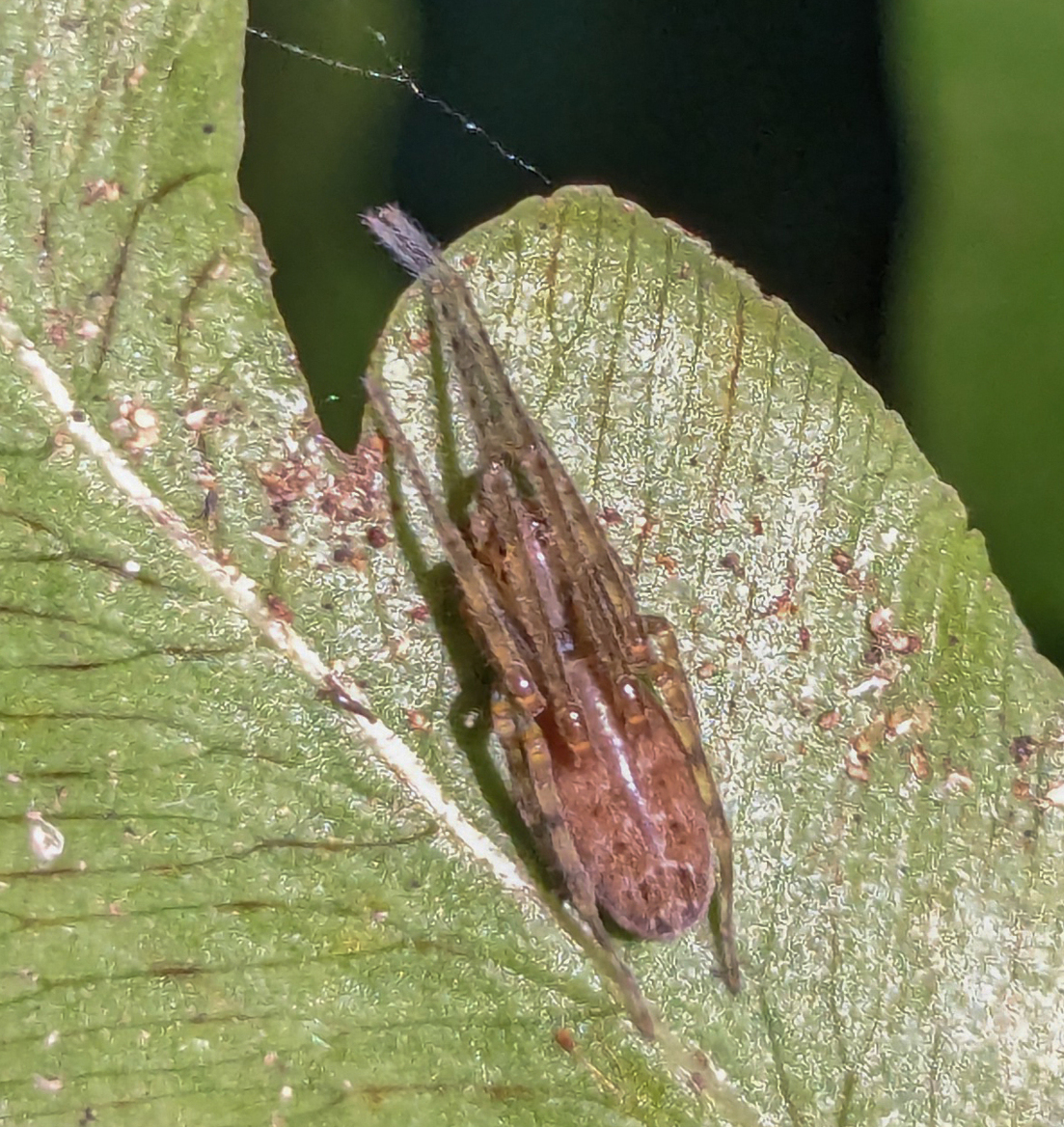
- F. protensa in Singapore

Scientific classification
- Kingdom: Animalia
- Phylum: Arthropoda
- Subphylum: Chelicerata
- Class: Arachnida
- Order: Araneae
- Infraorder: Araneomorphae
- Family: Psechridae
- Genus: Fecenia; Simon, 1887

Type species
- F. ochracea (Doleschall, 1859)

Species
- 4, see text

= Fecenia =

Genus of spiders

Fecenia is a genus of cribellate araneomorph spiders in the family Psechridae, and was first described by Eugène Louis Simon in 1887.

== Species ==
As of January 2026, this genus includes four species:

- Fecenia cylindrata Thorell, 1895 – China, Myanmar, Thailand, Laos
- Fecenia macilenta (Simon, 1886) – Malaysia, Indonesia (Sumatra)
- Fecenia ochracea (Doleschall, 1859) – Philippines to Australia (Queensland)
- Fecenia protensa Thorell, 1891 – India, Sri Lanka, Nepal, Thailand, Vietnam, Malaysia, Singapore, Brunei, Indonesia (Sumatra, Borneo, Bali)
