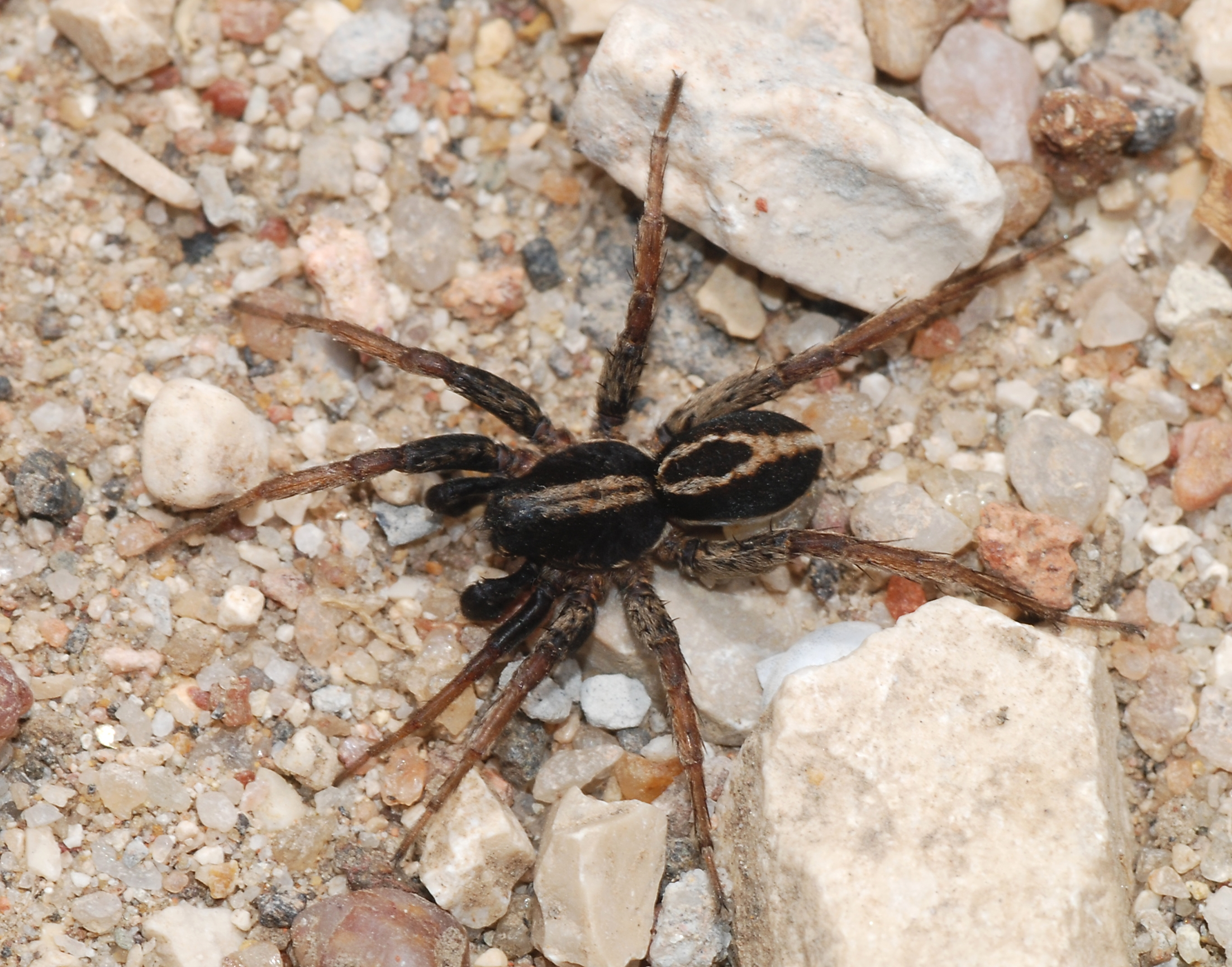
- Male Alopecosa albofasciata, a wolf spider and member of the RTA clade

Scientific classification
- Kingdom: Animalia
- Phylum: Arthropoda
- Subphylum: Chelicerata
- Class: Arachnida
- Order: Araneae
- Infraorder: Araneomorphae
- Clade: Entelegynae
- Clade: RTA clade

Clades
- Dionycha and see text

= RTA clade =

RTA clade Temporal range: Paleogene–Recent

Clade of spiders

The RTA clade is a clade of araneomorph spiders, united by the possession of a retrolateral tibial apophysis – a backward-facing projection on the tibia of the male pedipalp. Most of the members of the clade are wanderers and do not build webs. Despite making up approximately half of all modern spider diversity, there are no unambiguous records of the group from the Mesozoic and molecular clock evidence suggests that the group began to diversify during the Late Cretaceous.

== Families ==
In 2005, Coddington included 39 families in a cladogram showing the RTA clade:

- Agelenidae
- Amaurobiidae
- Ammoxenidae
- Amphinectidae (paraphyletic; merged into Desidae)
- Anyphaenidae
- Cithaeronidae
- Clubionidae
- Corinnidae
- Cryptothelidae
- Ctenidae (wandering spiders)
- Desidae
- Dictynidae
- Gallieniellidae
- Gnaphosidae
- Lamponidae
- Liocranidae
- Lycosidae (wolf spiders)
- Miturgidae (paraphyletic)
- Oxyopidae
- Philodromidae
- Phyxelididae
- Pisauridae
- Psechridae
- Salticidae (jumping spiders)
- Selenopidae
- Senoculidae
- Sparassidae
- Stiphidiidae
- Tengellidae (now merged into Zoropsidae)
- Thomisidae
- Titanoecidae
- Trechaleidae
- Trochanteriidae
- Zodariidae
- Zoridae (now a synonym of Miturgidae)
- Zorocratidae (no longer accepted; most genera now placed in Udubidae)
- Zoropsidae
