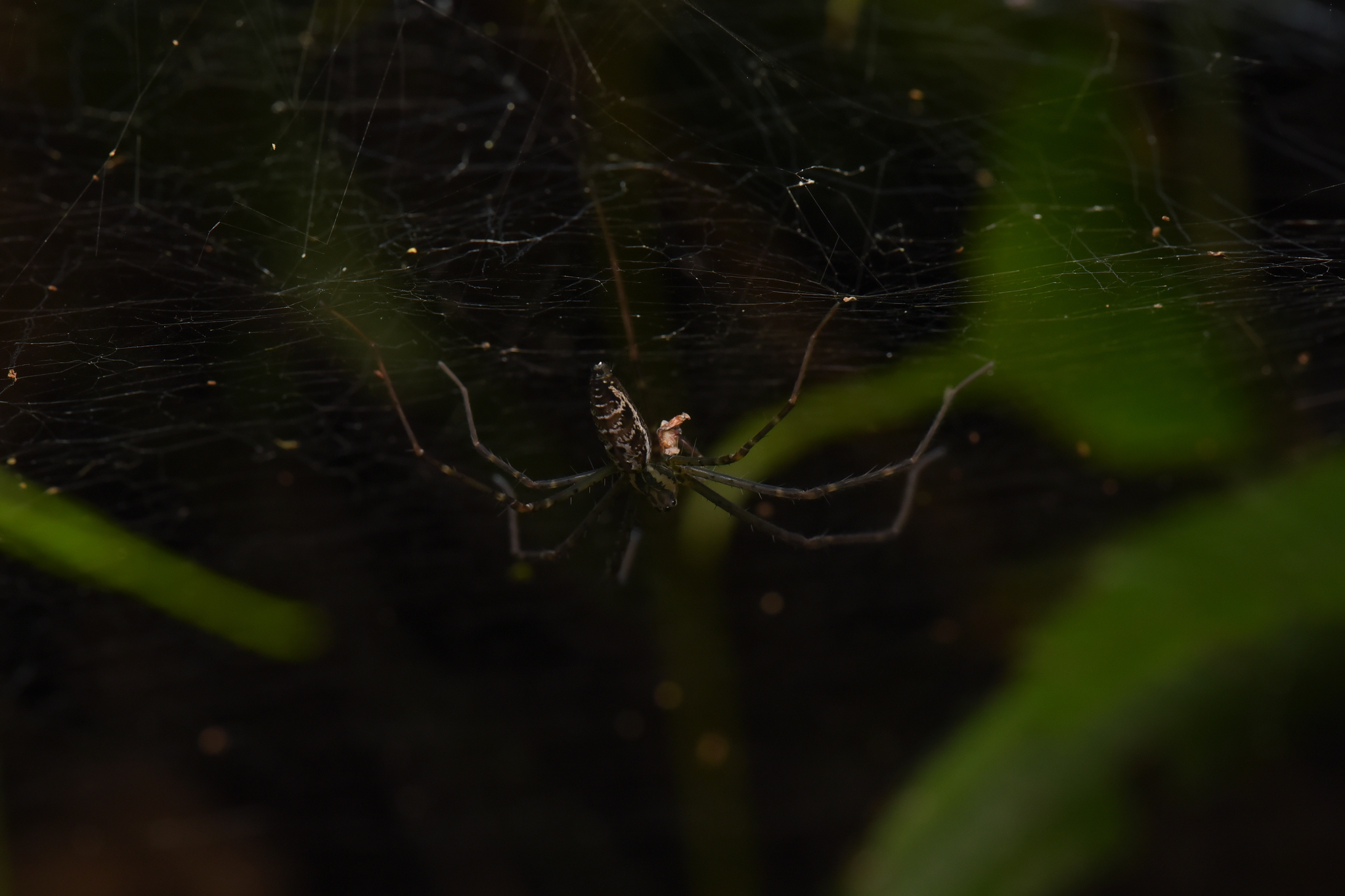
- P. torvus from India

Scientific classification
- Kingdom: Animalia
- Phylum: Arthropoda
- Subphylum: Chelicerata
- Class: Arachnida
- Order: Araneae
- Infraorder: Araneomorphae
- Family: Psechridae
- Genus: Psechrus; Thorell, 1878

Type species
- P. argentatus (Doleschall, 1857)

Species
- 57, see text

= Psechrus =

Genus of spiders

Psechrus is a genus of cribellate araneomorph spiders in the family Psechridae, and was first described by Tamerlan Thorell in 1878.

== Species ==
As of June 2019 it contains fifty-seven species, found only in Asia and Queensland:

- P. aluco Bayer, 2012 – Indonesia (Java)
- P. ampullaceus Bayer, 2014 – Vietnam
- P. ancoralis Bayer & Jäger, 2010 – Laos, Thailand
- P. annulatus Kulczyński, 1908 – Indonesia (Java)
- P. antraeus Bayer & Jäger, 2010 – Laos
- P. arcuatus Bayer, 2012 – Indonesia (Sumatra)
- P. argentatus (Doleschall, 1857) (type) – Indonesia (Sulawesi) to Australia (Queensland)
- P. arietinus Bayer, 2014 – Vietnam
- P. borneo Levi, 1982 – Borneo
- P. cebu Murphy, 1986 – Philippines
- P. changminae Feng, Zhang, Wu, Ma, T. B. Yang, Li & Z. Z. Yang, 2016 – China
- P. clavis Bayer, 2012 – Taiwan
- P. conicus Feng, Zhang, Wu, Ma, T. B. Yang, Li & Z. Z. Yang, 2016 – China
- P. crepido Bayer, 2012 – India
- P. decollatus Bayer, 2012 – Indonesia (Java)
- P. demiror Bayer, 2012 – Vietnam, Cambodia, and/or Laos
- P. discoideus Feng, Zhang, Wu, Ma, T. B. Yang, Li & Z. Z. Yang, 2016 – China
- P. elachys Bayer, 2012 – Thailand
- P. fuscai Bayer, 2012 – China
- P. ghecuanus Thorell, 1897 – Myanmar, Thailand, Laos, China
- P. hartmanni Bayer, 2012 – Sri Lanka
- P. himalayanus Simon, 1906 – India, Nepal, Bhutan
- P. huberi Bayer, 2014 – Philippines
- P. inflatus Bayer, 2012 – India, China
- P. insulanus Bayer, 2014 – Thailand
- P. jaegeri Bayer, 2012 – Thailand, Laos
- P. jinggangensis Wang & Yin, 2001 – China
- P. kenting Yoshida, 2009 – Taiwan
- P. khammouan Jäger, 2007 – Laos
- P. kinabalu Levi, 1982 – Borneo
- P. kunmingensis Yin, Wang & Zhang, 1985 – China
- P. laos Bayer, 2012 – Laos
- P. libelti Kulczyński, 1908 – Thailand to Indonesia (Borneo)
- P. luangprabang Jäger, 2007 – Laos
- P. marsyandi Levi, 1982 – Nepal
- P. mulu Levi, 1982 – Borneo
- P. norops Bayer, 2012 – Malaysia
- P. obtectus Bayer, 2012 – Vietnam
- P. omistes Bayer, 2014 – Indonesia (Sumatra)
- P. pakawini Bayer, 2012 – Myanmar, Thailand
- P. quasillus Bayer, 2014 – Borneo
- P. rani Wang & Yin, 2001 – China, Vietnam
- P. schwendingeri Bayer, 2012 – Philippines
- P. senoculatus Yin, Wang & Zhang, 1985 – China
- P. sinensis [[Lucien Berland|Berland]] & [[Lucien Berland|Berland]], 1914 – China
- P. singaporensis Thorell, 1894 – Malaysia, Singapore, Indonesia (Sumatra)
- P. spatulatus Feng, Zhang, Wu, Ma, T. B. Yang, Li & Z. Z. Yang, 2016 – China
- P. steineri Bayer & Jäger, 2010 – Laos
- P. taiwanensis Wang & Yin, 2001 – Taiwan
- P. tauricornis Bayer, 2012 – Sri Lanka
- P. tingpingensis Yin, Wang & Zhang, 1985 – China
- P. torvus (O. Pickard-Cambridge, 1869) – Sri Lanka, India
- P. triangulus Yang, Zhang, Zhu & Song, 2003 – China
- P. ulcus Bayer, 2012 – Borneo
- P. vivax Bayer, 2012 – Thailand
- P. wade Bayer, 2014 – Philippines
- P. zygon Bayer, 2012 – Sri Lanka
