= Senoculus darwini =

Scientific classification
- Kingdom: Animalia
- Phylum: Arthropoda
- Subphylum: Chelicerata
- Class: Arachnida
- Order: Araneae
- Infraorder: Araneomorphae
- Family: Senoculidae
- Genus: Senoculus
- Species: S. darwini

Binomial name
- Senoculus darwini (Holmberg, 1883)

Species of spider

Senoculus darwini is a species of spider in the family Senoculidae. It is found in Argentina.

== See also ==
- List of Senoculidae species
