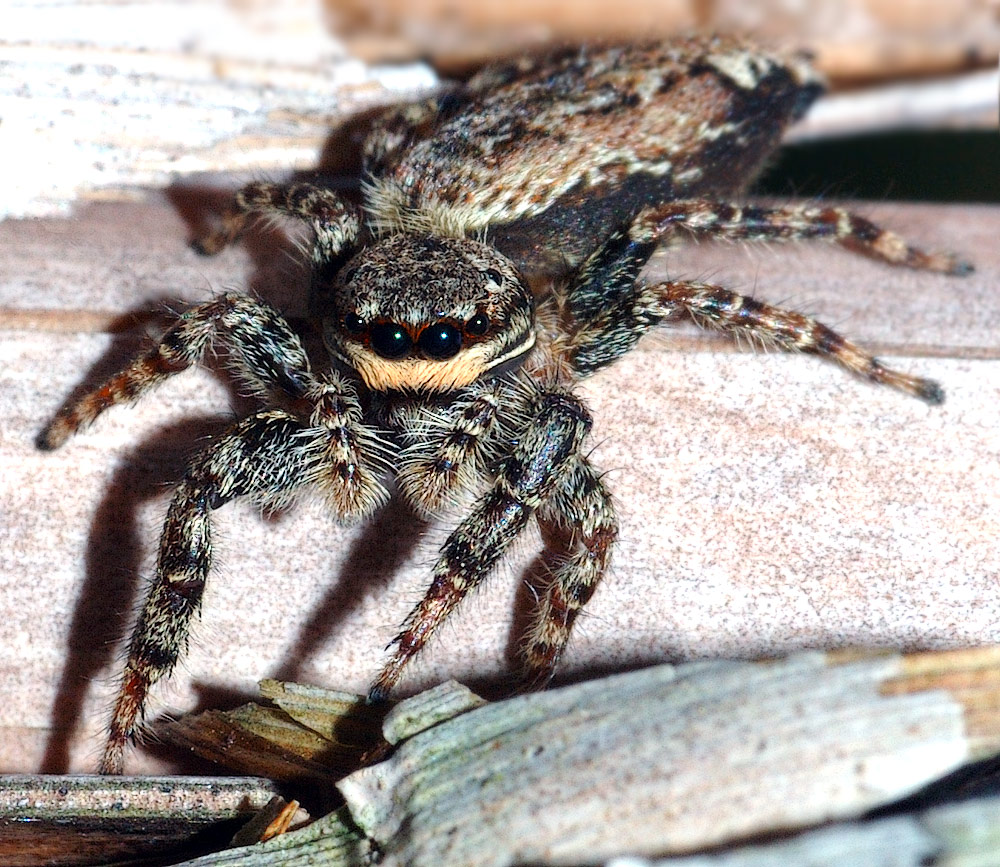
- Marpissa muscosa

Scientific classification
- Kingdom: Animalia
- Phylum: Arthropoda
- Subphylum: Chelicerata
- Class: Arachnida
- Order: Araneae
- Infraorder: Araneomorphae
- Clade: Entelegynae
- Clade: Dionycha

Diversity
- About 20 families

= Dionycha =

Clade of spiders

The Dionycha are a clade of spiders (Araneomorphae:Entelegynae), characterized by the possession of two tarsal claws with tufts of hairs (setae) beside them, which produce strong adhesion, enabling some species to climb glass. The circumscription of the group has varied widely; a 2021 analysis resulted in about 20 families, including Salticidae (jumping spiders), Gnaphosidae (ground spiders), and Clubionidae.

The Dionycha are considered to be a subgroup of the larger RTA clade. Most species hunt their prey instead of building webs.

There are no cribellate members in the Dionycha.

Today it is thought that the reduction of the third claw present in ancestral spiders evolved several times independently, so this alone is not a criterion that defines the clade.

== Families ==
In 2021, a group of several spider taxonomists published a major study of the phylogeny of Dionycha, using genetic and phenotypic data. It included the families listed below:

Dionycha

- Prodidomidae
- Dionycha A clade
  - Trachycosmidae
  - Clubionidae
  - Anyphaenidae
  - Phrurolithidae
  - Trachelidae
  - Liocranidae
  - Gallieniellidae
  - Cithaeronidae
  - Trochanteriidae
  - Gnaphosidae (including former Ammoxenidae)
  - Lamponidae
- Dionycha B clade
  - Philodromidae
  - Salticidae
  - Xenoctenidae
  - Miturgidae
  - Cheiracanthiidae
  - Selenopidae
  - Viridasiidae
  - Corinnidae
