= Campostichomma =

Scientific classification
- Domain: Eukaryota
- Kingdom: Animalia
- Phylum: Arthropoda
- Subphylum: Chelicerata
- Class: Arachnida
- Order: Araneae
- Infraorder: Araneomorphae
- Family: Udubidae
- Genus: Campostichomma; Karsch, 1892

Genus of spiders

Campostichomma is a genus of spiders in the family Udubidae native to Sri Lanka. Many of its species were moved to either Griswoldia or Devendra. This genus was originally placed in the family Agelenidae. It was moved to Miturgidae in 1967, to Zoropsidae in 1999, then to Udubidae in 2015.

== Species ==
The World Spider Catalog accepts four species, as of May 2018:

- Campostichomma alawala Polotow & Griswold, 2017 – Sri Lanka
- Campostichomma harasbedda Polotow & Griswold, 2017 – Sri Lanka
- Campostichomma manicatum Karsch, 1892 (type species) – Sri Lanka
- Campostichomma mudduk Polotow & Griswold, 2017 – Sri Lanka
