= Uduba =

Scientific classification
- Kingdom: Animalia
- Phylum: Arthropoda
- Subphylum: Chelicerata
- Class: Arachnida
- Order: Araneae
- Infraorder: Araneomorphae
- Family: Udubidae
- Genus: Uduba; Simon, 1880

Type species
- U. madagascariensis (Vinson, 1863)

Species
- 39, see text

Synonyms
- Calamistrula

Genus of spiders

Uduba is a genus of Malagasy araneomorph spiders in the family Udubidae, first described by Eugène Simon in 1880.

== Species ==
As of December 2022 it contains thirty-nine species:

- Uduba andriamihajai Griswold, Ubick, Ledford & Polotow, 2022 — Madagascar
- Uduba balsama Griswold, Ubick, Ledford & Polotow, 2022 — Madagascar
- Uduba barbarae Griswold, Ubick, Ledford & Polotow, 2022 — Madagascar
- Uduba dahli Simon, 1903 — Madagascar
- Uduba danielae Griswold, Ubick, Ledford & Polotow, 2022 — Madagascar
- Uduba evanescens Dahl, 1901 — Madagascar
- Uduba fandroana Griswold, Ubick, Ledford & Polotow, 2022 — Madagascar
- Uduba fisheri Griswold, Ubick, Ledford & Polotow, 2022 — Madagascar
- Uduba funerea Simon, 1906 — Madagascar
- Uduba goodmani Griswold, Ubick, Ledford & Polotow, 2022 — Madagascar
- Uduba hainteny Griswold, Ubick, Ledford & Polotow, 2022 — Madagascar
- Uduba halabe Griswold, Ubick, Ledford & Polotow, 2022 — Madagascar
- Uduba heliani Griswold, Ubick, Ledford & Polotow, 2022 — Madagascar
- Uduba hiragasy Griswold, Ubick, Ledford & Polotow, 2022 — Madagascar
- Uduba ibonia Griswold, Ubick, Ledford & Polotow, 2022 — Madagascar
- Uduba ida Griswold, Ubick, Ledford & Polotow, 2022 — Madagascar
- Uduba irwini Griswold, Ubick, Ledford & Polotow, 2022 — Madagascar
- Uduba jayjay Griswold, Ubick, Ledford & Polotow, 2022 — Madagascar
- Uduba kavanaughi Griswold, Ubick, Ledford & Polotow, 2022 — Madagascar
- Uduba lakroa Griswold, Ubick, Ledford & Polotow, 2022 — Madagascar
- Uduba lamba Griswold, Ubick, Ledford & Polotow, 2022 — Madagascar
- Uduba lavitra Griswold, Ubick, Ledford & Polotow, 2022 — Madagascar
- Uduba lehibekokoa Griswold, Ubick, Ledford & Polotow, 2022 — Madagascar
- Uduba madagascariensis Vinson, 1863 — Madagascar
- Uduba milamina Griswold, Ubick, Ledford & Polotow, 2022 — Madagascar
- Uduba orona Griswold, Ubick, Ledford & Polotow, 2022 — Madagascar
- Uduba platnicki Griswold, Ubick, Ledford & Polotow, 2022 — Madagascar
- Uduba pseudoevanescens Griswold, Ubick, Ledford & Polotow, 2022 — Madagascar
- Uduba rajery Griswold, Ubick, Ledford & Polotow, 2022 — Madagascar
- Uduba rakotofrah Griswold, Ubick, Ledford & Polotow, 2022 — Madagascar
- Uduba rakotozafy Griswold, Ubick, Ledford & Polotow, 2022 — Madagascar
- Uduba rinha Griswold, Ubick, Ledford & Polotow, 2022 — Madagascar
- Uduba salegy Griswold, Ubick, Ledford & Polotow, 2022 — Madagascar
- Uduba sarotra Griswold, Ubick, Ledford & Polotow, 2022 — Madagascar
- Uduba schlingeri Griswold, Ubick, Ledford & Polotow, 2022 — Madagascar
- Uduba taralily Griswold, Ubick, Ledford & Polotow, 2022 — Madagascar
- Uduba valiha Griswold, Ubick, Ledford & Polotow, 2022 — Madagascar
- Uduba volana Griswold, Ubick, Ledford & Polotow, 2022 — Madagascar
- Uduba woodae Griswold, Ubick, Ledford & Polotow, 2022 — Madagascar
