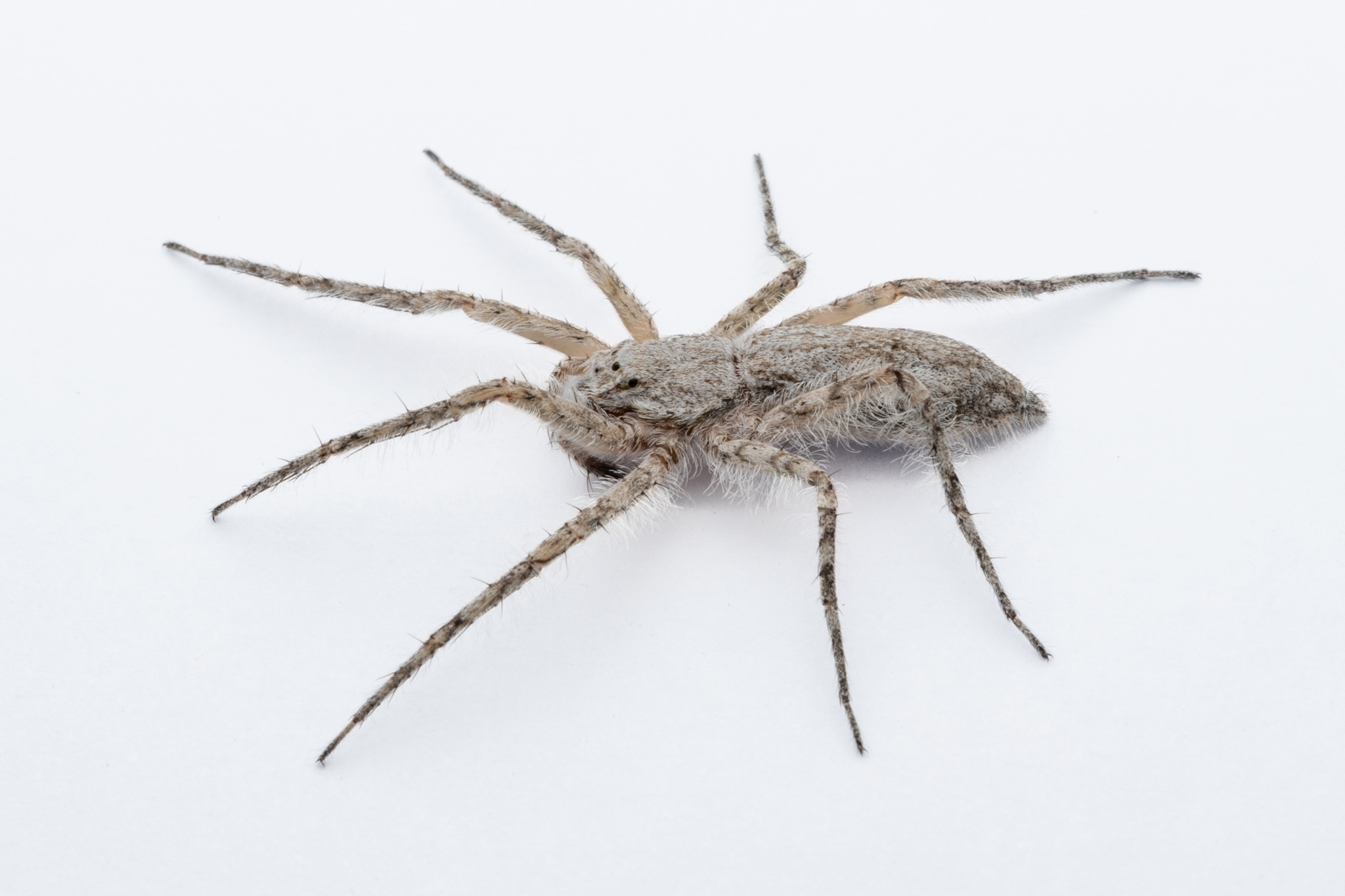
- Senoculus fimbriatus

Scientific classification
- Kingdom: Animalia
- Phylum: Arthropoda
- Subphylum: Chelicerata
- Class: Arachnida
- Order: Araneae
- Infraorder: Araneomorphae
- Family: Senoculidae; Simon, 1890
- Genus: Senoculus; Taczanowski, 1872

Type species
- S. maronicus Taczanowski, 1872

Species
- 31, see text
- blue: reported countries (WSC)

Synonyms
- Labdacus O. Pickard-Cambridge, 1873; Neothereutes Holmberg, 1883; Platyctenus Keyserling, 1879; Stenoctenus Keyserling, 1879

= Senoculus =

Genus of spiders

Senoculus is a genus of araneomorph spiders in the family Senoculidae, and was first described by Władysław Taczanowski in 1872. It is the only genus in the family Senoculidae.

== Species ==
As of January 2026, this genus includes 31 species:

- Senoculus albidus (F. O. Pickard-Cambridge, 1897) – Brazil
- Senoculus barroanus Chickering, 1941 – Panama
- Senoculus bucolicus Chickering, 1941 – Panama
- Senoculus cambridgei Mello-Leitão, 1927 – Brazil
- Senoculus canaliculatus F. O. Pickard-Cambridge, 1902 – Mexico to Panama
- Senoculus carminatus Mello-Leitão, 1927 – Brazil
- Senoculus darwini (Holmberg, 1883) – Argentina
- Senoculus fimbriatus Mello-Leitão, 1927 – Brazil
- Senoculus gracilis (Keyserling, 1879) – Guyana to Argentina
- Senoculus guianensis Caporiacco, 1947 – Guyana
- Senoculus iricolor (Simon, 1880) – Brazil
- Senoculus maronicus Taczanowski, 1872 – French Guiana
- Senoculus minutus Mello-Leitão, 1927 – Brazil
- Senoculus monastoides (O. Pickard-Cambridge, 1873) – Brazil
- Senoculus nigropurpureus Mello-Leitão, 1927 – Paraguay
- Senoculus penicillatus Mello-Leitão, 1927 – Trinidad, Brazil, Paraguay
- Senoculus planus Mello-Leitão, 1927 – Brazil
- Senoculus plumosus (Simon, 1880) – Brazil
- Senoculus prolatus (O. Pickard-Cambridge, 1896) – Mexico, Guatemala
- Senoculus proximus Mello-Leitão, 1927 – Brazil
- Senoculus purpureus (Simon, 1880) – Panama to Argentina
- Senoculus robustus Chickering, 1941 – Panama, Brazil
- Senoculus rubicundus Chickering, 1953 – Panama
- Senoculus rubromaculatus Keyserling, 1879 – Peru
- Senoculus ruficapillus (Simon, 1880) – Brazil
- Senoculus scalarum Schiapelli & Gerschman, 1958 – Argentina
- Senoculus silvaticus Chickering, 1941 – Panama
- Senoculus tigrinus Chickering, 1941 – Panama
- Senoculus uncatus Mello-Leitão, 1927 – Brazil
- Senoculus wiedenmeyeri Schenkel, 1953 – Venezuela
- Senoculus zeteki Chickering, 1953 – Panama
