= Raecius =

Scientific classification
- Kingdom: Animalia
- Phylum: Arthropoda
- Subphylum: Chelicerata
- Class: Arachnida
- Order: Araneae
- Infraorder: Araneomorphae
- Family: Udubidae
- Genus: Raecius; Simon, 1892

Type species
- R. crassipes (L. Koch, 1875)

Species
- 6, see text

Synonyms
- Mnesitheus

Genus of spiders

Raecius is a genus of African araneomorph spiders in the family Udubidae, first described by Eugène Simon in 1892.

== Species ==
As of April 2019 it contains six species:

- Raecius aculeatus Dahl, 1901 — Congo
- Raecius asper Thorell, 1899 — Cameroon, Equatorial Guinea (Bioko)
- Raecius congoensis Griswold, 2002 — Congo
- Raecius crassipes L. Koch, 1875 — Ethiopia
- Raecius jocquei Griswold, 2002 — Ivory Coast
- Raecius scharffi Griswold, 2002 — Tanzania
