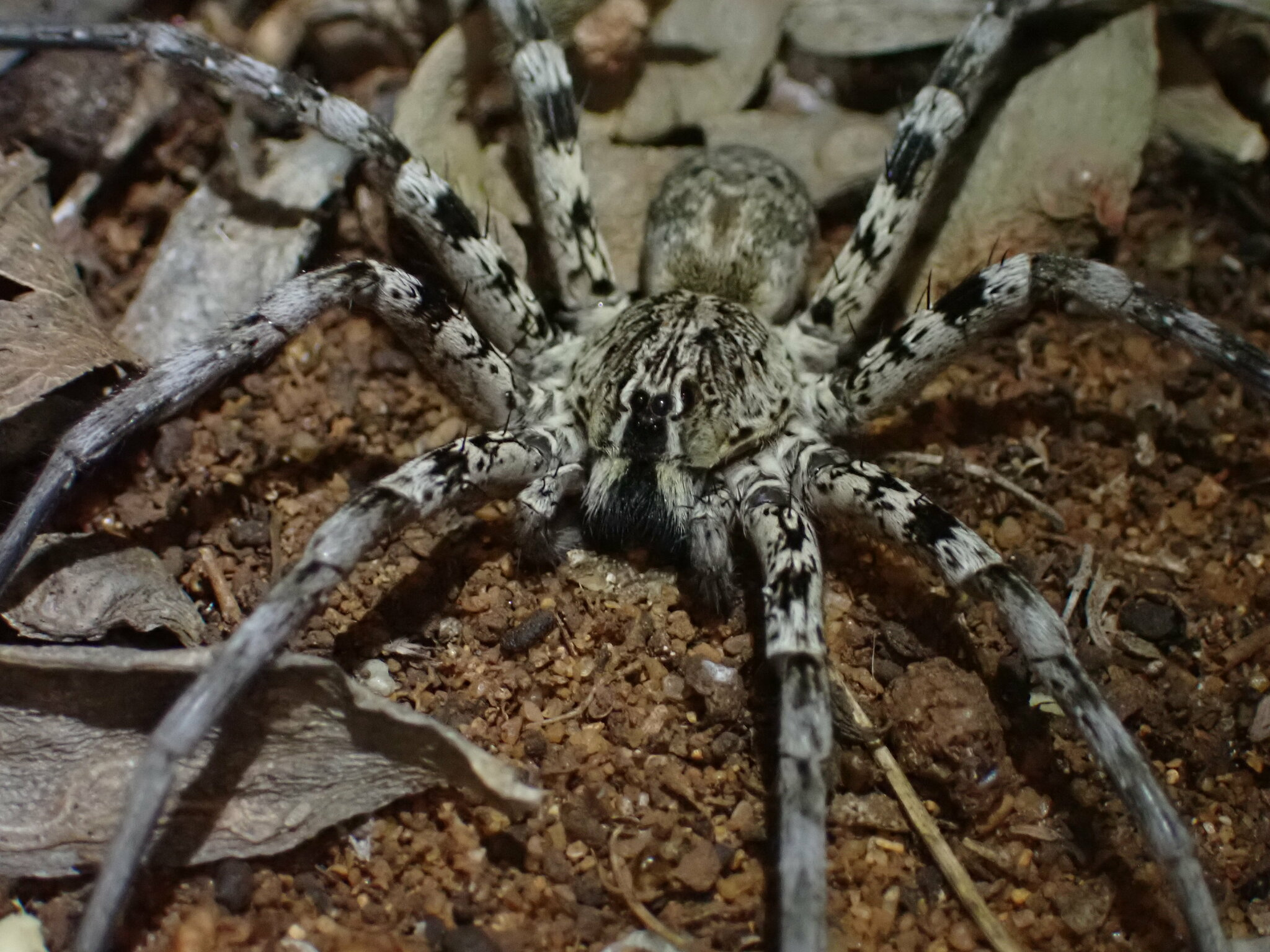
- Viridasius fasciatus
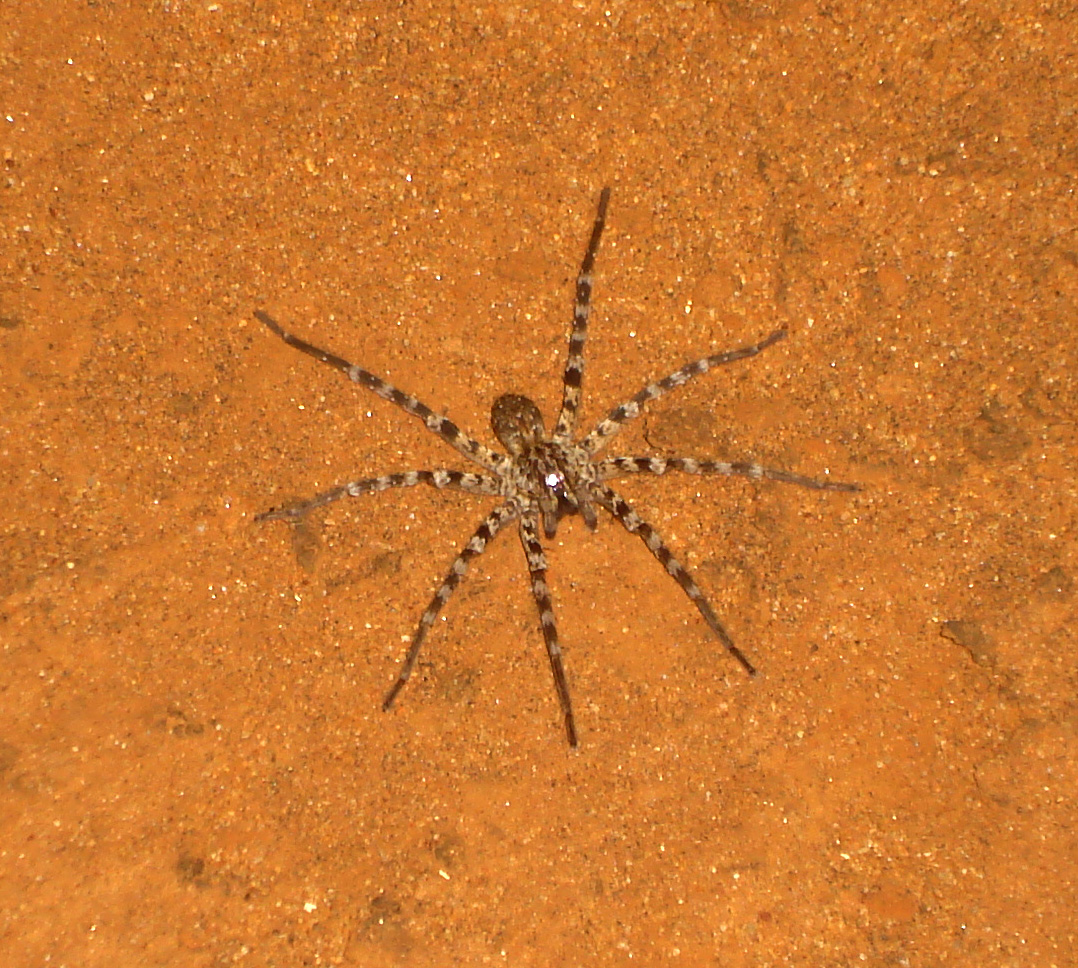
- V. fasciatus

Scientific classification
- Kingdom: Animalia
- Phylum: Arthropoda
- Subphylum: Chelicerata
- Class: Arachnida
- Order: Araneae
- Infraorder: Araneomorphae
- Family: Viridasiidae; Lehtinen, 1967

Genera
- 3 genera, 14 species
- blue: reported countries (WSC) green: observation hotspots (iNaturalist)

= Viridasiidae =

Family of spiders

Viridasiidae is a family of araneomorph spiders split from the family Ctenidae in 2015.

== Genera ==
As of January 2026, this family includes three genera and fourteen species:

- Mahafalytenus Silva-Dávila, 2007 – Madagascar
- Viridasius Simon, 1889 – Madagascar
- Vulsor Simon, 1889 – Comoros, Madagascar, Mayotte, Brazil
