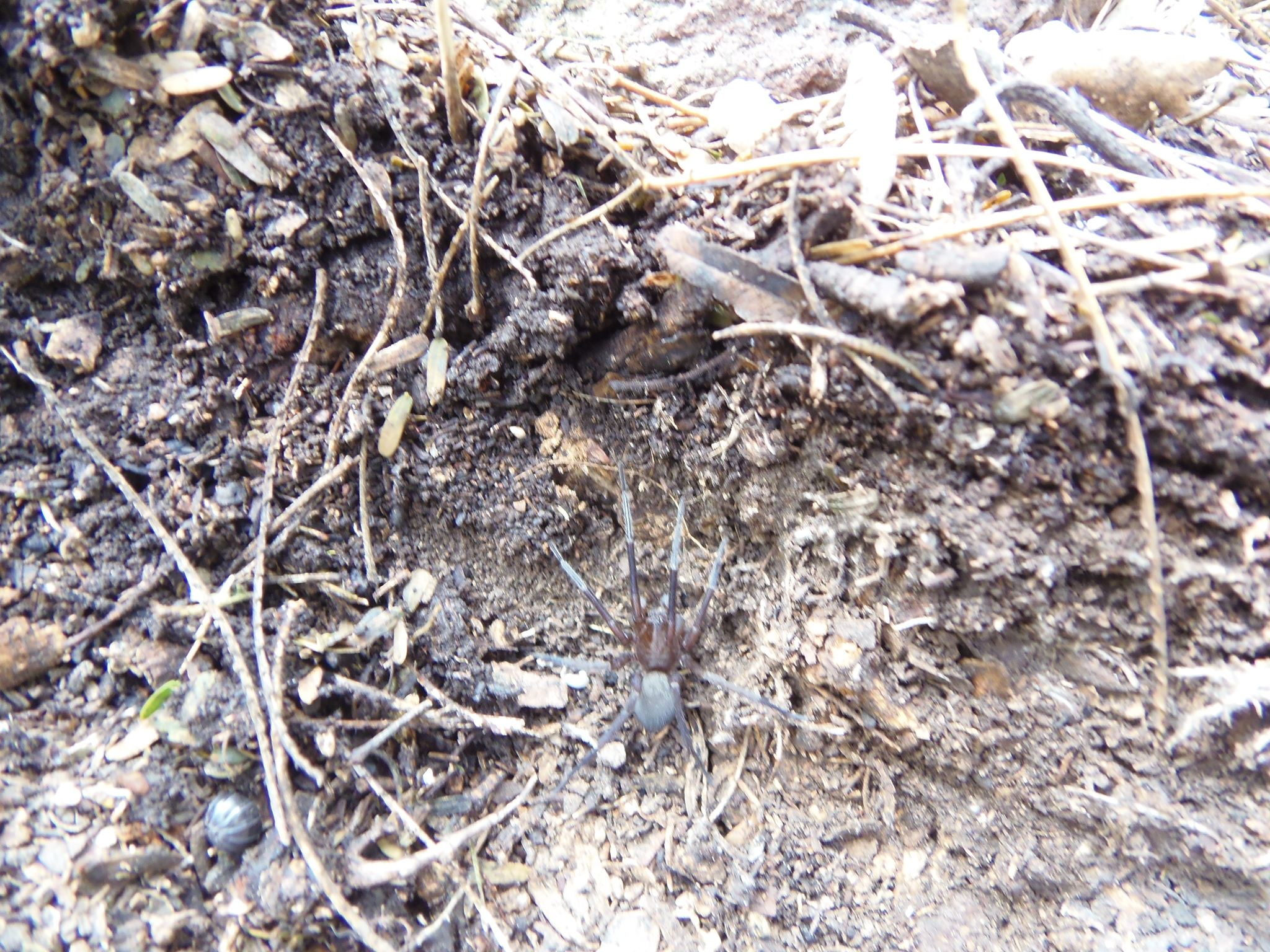
- Zorocrates sp.

Scientific classification
- Kingdom: Animalia
- Phylum: Arthropoda
- Subphylum: Chelicerata
- Class: Arachnida
- Order: Araneae
- Infraorder: Araneomorphae
- Family: Zoropsidae
- Genus: Zorocrates; Simon

Type species
- Zorocrates fuscus

Species
- 31, see text

= Zorocrates =

Genus of spiders

Zorocrates is a genus of spiders in the family Zoropsidae. It was first described in 1888 by Simon. As of 2017, it contains 31 species.

== Species ==
Zorocrates comprises the following species:

- Zorocrates aemulus Gertsch, 1935
- Zorocrates alternatus Gertsch & Davis, 1936
- Zorocrates apulco Platnick & Ubick, 2007
- Zorocrates badius Simon, 1895
- Zorocrates blas Platnick & Ubick, 2007
- Zorocrates bosencheve Platnick & Ubick, 2007
- Zorocrates chamela Platnick & Ubick, 2007
- Zorocrates chamula Platnick & Ubick, 2007
- Zorocrates chiapa Platnick & Ubick, 2007
- Zorocrates colima Platnick & Ubick, 2007
- Zorocrates contreras Platnick & Ubick, 2007
- Zorocrates fuscus Simon, 1888
- Zorocrates gnaphosoides (O. Pickard-Cambridge, 1892)
- Zorocrates guerrerensis Gertsch & Davis, 1940
- Zorocrates huatusco Platnick & Ubick, 2007
- Zorocrates karli Gertsch & Riechert, 1976
- Zorocrates mistus O. Pickard-Cambridge, 1896
- Zorocrates mordax (O. Pickard-Cambridge, 1898)
- Zorocrates nochix Platnick & Ubick, 2007
- Zorocrates oaxaca Platnick & Ubick, 2007
- Zorocrates ocampo Platnick & Ubick, 2007
- Zorocrates pictus Simon, 1895
- Zorocrates pie Platnick & Ubick, 2007
- Zorocrates potosi Platnick & Ubick, 2007
- Zorocrates soledad Platnick & Ubick, 2007
- Zorocrates sotano Platnick & Ubick, 2007
- Zorocrates tequila Platnick & Ubick, 2007
- Zorocrates terrell Platnick & Ubick, 2007
- Zorocrates unicolor (Banks, 1901)
- Zorocrates xilitla Platnick & Ubick, 2007
- Zorocrates yolo Platnick & Ubick, 2007
