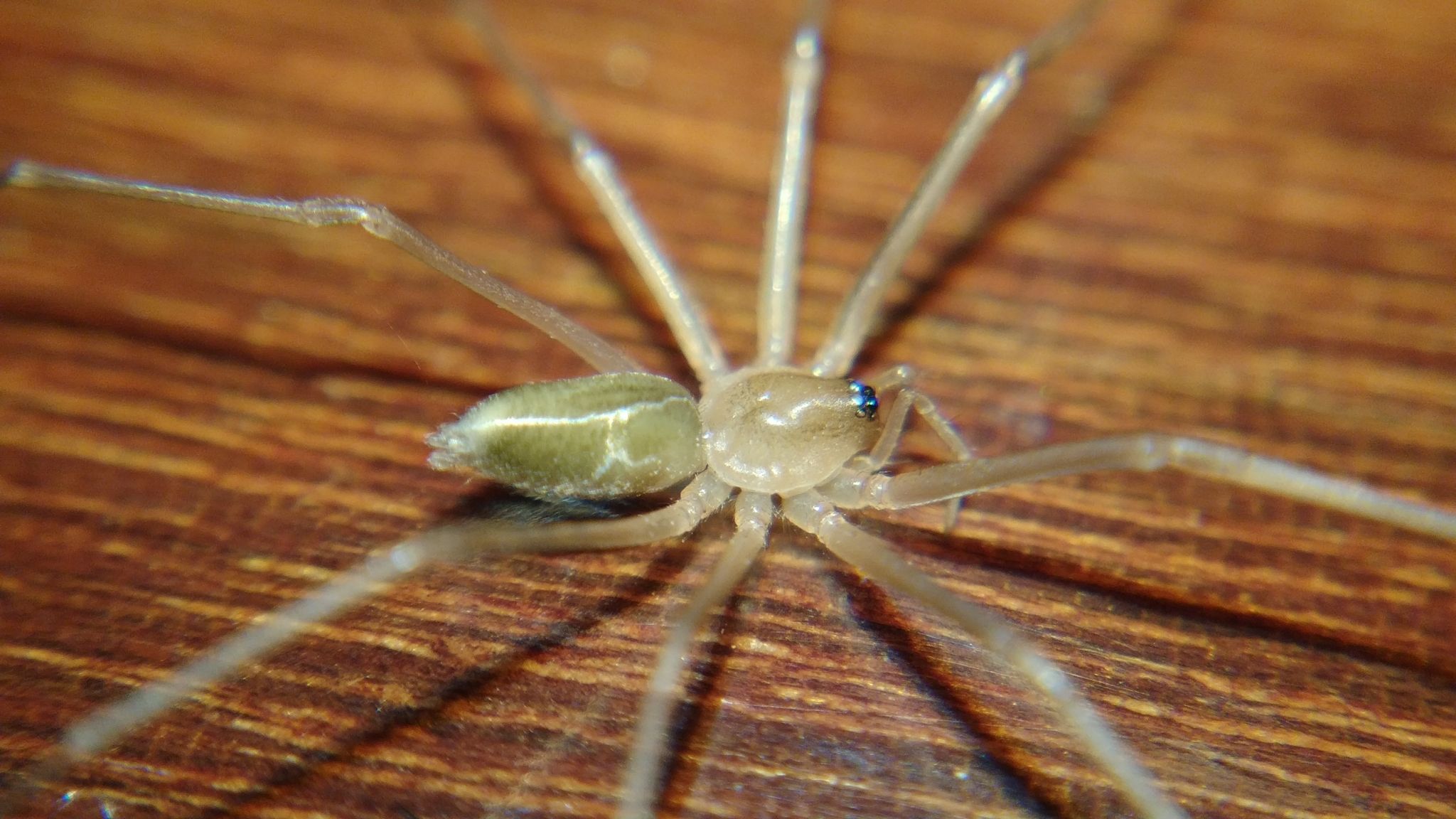
- C. praedonius from Thailand
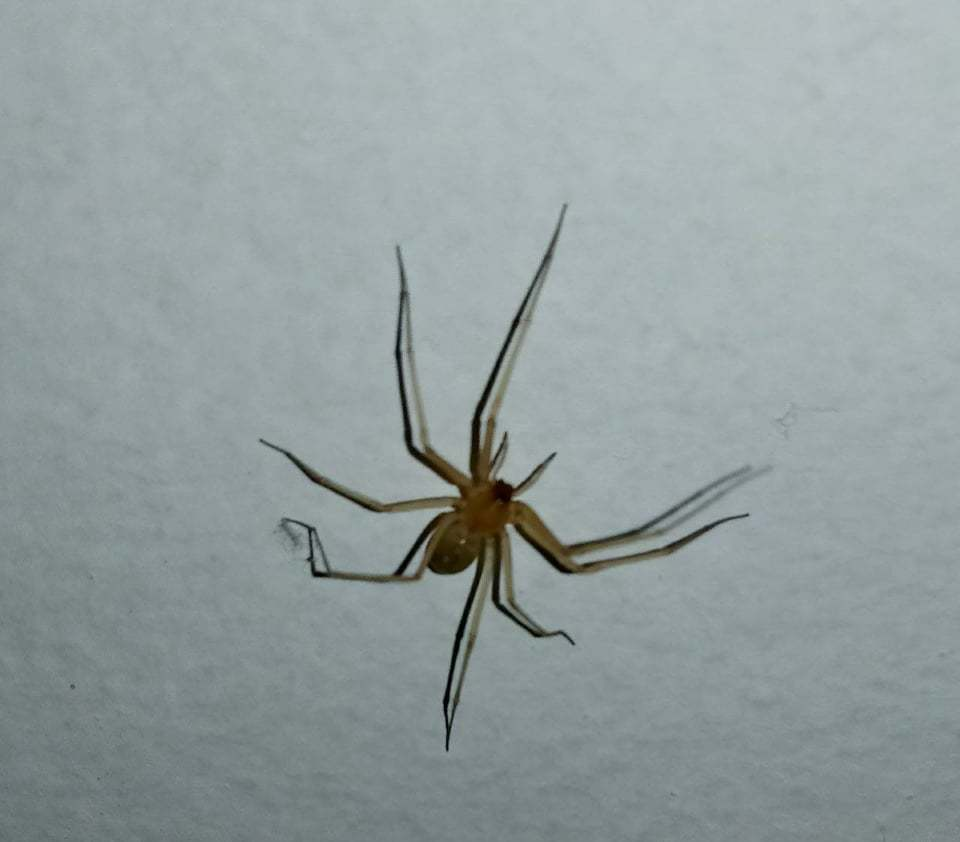
- Cithaeron praedonius

Scientific classification
- Kingdom: Animalia
- Phylum: Arthropoda
- Subphylum: Chelicerata
- Class: Arachnida
- Order: Araneae
- Infraorder: Araneomorphae
- Family: Cithaeronidae; Simon, 1893

Genera
- Cithaeron O. Pickard-Cambridge, 1872; Inthaeron Platnick, 1991

Diversity
- 2 genera, 10 species
- blue: reported countries (WSC) green: observation hotspots (iNaturalist)

= Cithaeronidae =

Family of spiders

Cithaeronidae is a small family of araneomorph spiders first described by Simon in 1893 Female Cithaeron are about 5 to 7 millimetres (0.20 to 0.28 in) long, males about 4 millimetres (0.16 in).

They are pale yellowish, fast-moving spiders that actively hunt at night and rest during the day, building silken retreats below rocks. They prefer very hot, dry stony places.

== Distribution ==
While Inthaeron occurs only in India, members of the genus Cithaeron are found in Africa, India and parts of Eurasia. Three adult females of C. praedonius were found in Teresina, Piauí, Brazil. As they were found in and near human housings, they presumably were accidentally introduced. This is probably also the case for finds in the Northern Territory of Australia.

Another population of C. praedonius has been discovered in Florida U.S.A., with reports of a stable breeding population.(Pers. comm. Joseph Stiles)

== Genera ==
As of January 2026, this family includes two genera and ten species:

- Cithaeron O. Pickard-Cambridge, 1872 – Africa, Malaysia, India, Iran, Turkey, Cyprus, Greece, Middle East to India, North Africa. Introduced to Bahamas, Cuba, Honduras, Panama, Mexico, United States, Australia, Brazil
- Inthaeron Platnick, 1991 – India
