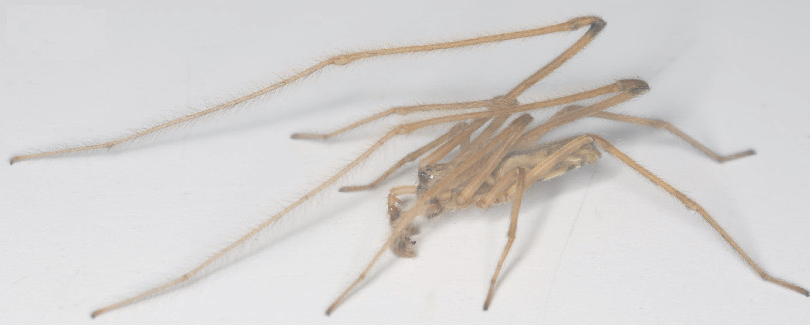
- Fecenia cylindrata
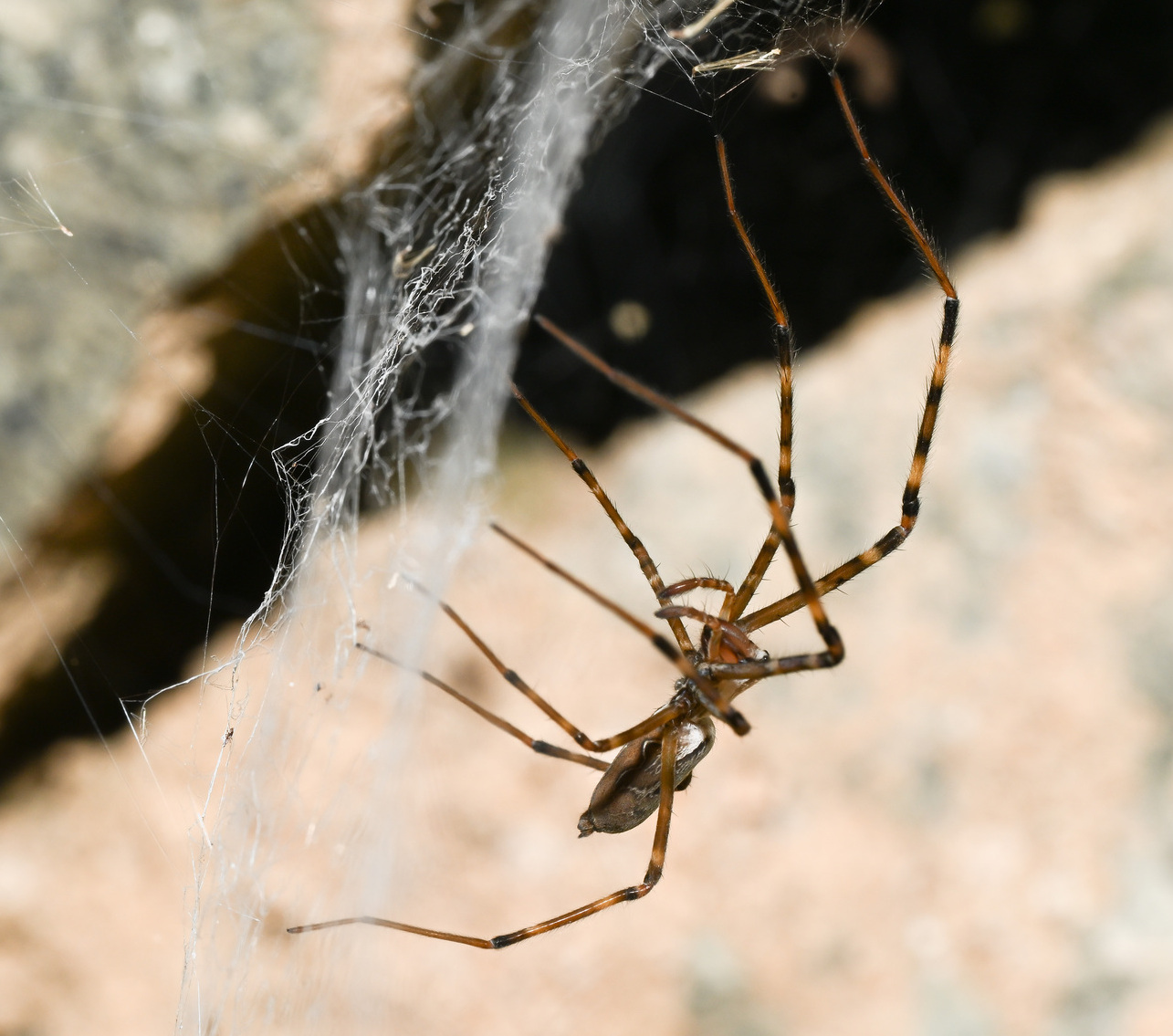
- Psechrus senoculatus in China

Scientific classification
- Kingdom: Animalia
- Phylum: Arthropoda
- Subphylum: Chelicerata
- Class: Arachnida
- Order: Araneae
- Infraorder: Araneomorphae
- Family: Psechridae; Simon, 1890

Genera
- Fecenia Simon, 1887; Psechrus Thorell, 1878; †Eomatachia Petrunkevitch, 1942

Diversity
- 2 genera, 64 species
- blue: reported countries (WSC)

= Psechridae =

Psechridae Temporal range: Oligocene–Present

Family of spiders

Psechridae is a family of araneomorph spiders with about 60 species in two genera. These are among the biggest cribellate spiders with body lengths up to 2 centimetres (0.79 in) and funnel webs more than 1 metre (3 ft 3 in) in diameter.

The family belongs to the RTA clade of spiders because they all have a Retrolateral Tibial Apophysis on the male pedipalp. A recent phylogenetic analysis places Psechridae as close relatives of the lynx spiders, wolf spiders, and nursery web spiders.

They feature several characteristics normally found in ecribellate spiders, for example brood care behavior, and a colulus with no apparent function. They have greatly elongated legs, with the last element being very flexible. Female Psechrus carry their egg-sac in the chelicerae, similar to their relatives, the ecribellate Pisauridae. Members of Psechrus construct horizontal webs lace webs, while Fecenia construct pseudo-orbs, similar to orb webs of Orbiculariae spiders in an example of evolutionary convergence.

== Distribution ==
They occur in southeastern Asia, ranging from India in the west, to Solomon Islands in the east, reaching as far south as northern Australia, and north to central China. They are found in forest, rocky areas, and caves from lowlands to altitudes exceeding 2,000 metres (1.2 mi).

== Genera ==
As of January 2026, this family includes two genera and 64 species:

- Fecenia Simon, 1887 – Asia
- Psechrus Thorell, 1878 – Asia, Australia
