= List of Ctenidae species =

This page lists all described species of the spider family Ctenidae accepted by the World Spider Catalog as of February 2021:

== A ==
=== Acantheis ===
Acantheis Thorell, 1891

- A. boetonensis (Strand, 1913) — Indonesia (Sulawesi)
- A. celer (Simon, 1897) — Indonesia (Java)
- A. dimidiatus (Thorell, 1890) — Indonesia (Sumatra)
- A. indicus Gravely, 1931 — India
- A. laetus (Thorell, 1890) — Borneo
- A. longiventris Simon, 1897 — Malaysia, Indonesia
- A. nipponicus Ono, 2008 — Japan
- A. oreus (Simon, 1901) — Malaysia
- A. variatus (Thorell, 1890) (type) — Indonesia (Nias Is.)

=== Acanthoctenus ===
Acanthoctenus Keyserling, 1877

- A. alux Arizala, Labarque & Polotow, 2021 — Guatemala
- A. chickeringi Arizala, Labarque & Polotow, 2021 — Panama
- A. dumicola Simon, 1906 — Venezuela
- A. gaujoni Simon, 1906 — Ecuador
- A. kollari (Reimoser, 1939) — Costa Rica
- A. lamarrei Arizala, Labarque & Polotow, 2021 — Panama
- A. maculatus Petrunkevitch, 1925 — Panama
- A. manauara Arizala, Labarque & Polotow, 2021 — Brazil
- A. obauratus Simon, 1906 — Brazil
- A. plebejus Simon, 1906 — Trinidad and Tobago
- A. remotus Chickering, 1960 — Jamaica
- A. rubrotaeniatus Mello-Leitão, 1947 — Brazil
- A. spiniger Keyserling, 1877 (type) — Mexico
- A. spinipes Keyserling, 1877 — Colombia
- A. torotoro Arizala, Labarque & Polotow, 2021 — Bolivia
- A. virginea (Kraus, 1955) — El Salvador

=== Africactenus ===
Africactenus Hyatt, 1954

- A. acteninus Benoit, 1974 — Congo
- A. agilior (Pocock, 1900) (type) — West, Central Africa
- A. decorosus (Arts, 1912) — Cameroon, Ivory Coast, Congo
- A. depressus Hyatt, 1954 — Cameroon
- A. evadens Steyn & Jocqué, 2003 — Ivory Coast, Guinea
- A. fernandensis (Simon, 1909) — Equatorial Guinea (Bioko)
- A. ghesquierei (Lessert, 1946) — Congo
- A. giganteus Benoit, 1974 — Congo
- A. guineensis (Simon, 1897) — Sierra Leone
- A. kribiensis Hyatt, 1954 — Cameroon, Gabon
- A. leleupi Benoit, 1975 — Congo
- A. longurio (Simon, 1909) — West Africa
- A. monitor Steyn & Jocqué, 2003 — Ivory Coast
- A. pococki Hyatt, 1954 — Cameroon, Gabon
- A. poecilus (Thorell, 1899) — Cameroon, Gabon
- A. simoni Hyatt, 1954 — Cameroon
- A. sladeni Hyatt, 1954 — Cameroon
- A. tenuitarsis (Strand, 1908) — Cameroon
- A. tridentatus Hyatt, 1954 — Zimbabwe
- A. trilateralis Hyatt, 1954 — Cameroon, Gabon
- A. unumus Sankaran & Sebastian, 2018 — India

=== Afroneutria ===
Afroneutria Polotow & Jocqué, 2015

- A. erythrochelis (Simon, 1876) — West, Central, East Africa
- A. hybrida Polotow & Jocqué, 2015 — Tanzania
- A. immortalis (Arts, 1912) — Kenya, Tanzania
- A. quadrimaculata Polotow & Jocqué, 2015 — Congo
- A. tanga Polotow & Jocqué, 2016 — Tanzania
- A. velox (Blackwall, 1865) (type) — Congo, Tanzania, Malawi, Zimbabwe, Mozambique

=== Amauropelma ===
Amauropelma Raven, Stumkat & Gray, 2001

- A. annegretae Jäger, 2012 — Laos
- A. anzses Raven & Stumkat, 2001 — Australia (Queensland)
- A. beyersdorfi Jäger, 2012 — India
- A. bluewater Raven & Stumkat, 2001 — Australia (Queensland)
- A. claudie Raven & Stumkat, 2001 — Australia (Queensland)
- A. ekeftys Jäger, 2012 — India
- A. fungiferum (Thorell, 1890) — Malaysia
- A. gayundah Raven & Stumkat, 2001 — Australia (Queensland)
- A. gordon Raven & Stumkat, 2001 — Australia (Queensland)
- A. hasenpuschi Raven & Stumkat, 2001 — Australia (Queensland)
- A. hoffmanni Jäger, 2012 — Laos
- A. jagelkii Jäger, 2012 — Laos
- A. leo Raven & Stumkat, 2001 — Australia (Queensland)
- A. matakecil Miller & Rahmadi, 2012 — Indonesia (Java)
- A. mcilwraith Raven & Stumkat, 2001 — Australia (Queensland)
- A. monteithi Raven & Stumkat, 2001 — Australia (Queensland)
- A. mossman Raven & Stumkat, 2001 — Australia (Queensland)
- A. pineck Raven & Stumkat, 2001 — Australia (Queensland)
- A. rifleck Raven & Stumkat, 2001 — Australia (Queensland)
- A. staschi Jäger, 2012 — India
- A. torbjorni Raven & Gray, 2001 — Australia (Queensland)
- A. trueloves Raven & Stumkat, 2001 (type) — Australia (Queensland)
- A. undara Raven & Gray, 2001 — Australia (Queensland)
- A. wallaman Raven & Stumkat, 2001 — Australia (Queensland)

=== Amicactenus ===
Amicactenus Henrard & Jocqué, 2017

- A. eminens (Arts, 1912) — Togo, Ivory Coast
- A. fallax (Steyn & Van der Donckt, 2003) — Ivory Coast
- A. mysticus Henrard & Jocqué, 2017 — Guinea, Liberia
- A. pergulanus (Arts, 1912) (type) — West, Central Africa

=== Anahita ===
Anahita

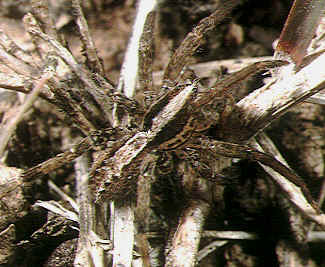
Anahita fauna, female

Anahita Karsch, 1879

- A. aculeata (Simon, 1897) — West, Central Africa
- A. blandini Benoit, 1977 — Ivory Coast
- A. centralis Benoit, 1977 — Central Africa
- A. concrassata Benoit, 1977 — Burundi
- A. concreata Benoit, 1977 — Congo
- A. concussor Benoit, 1977 — Congo
- A. denticulata (Simon, 1884) — Myanmar, Indonesia (Simeulue)
- A. faradjensis Lessert, 1929 — Congo
- A. fauna Karsch, 1879 (type) — Russia (Far East), China, Korea, Japan, Taiwan
- A. feae (F. O. Pickard-Cambridge, 1902) — Myanmar
- A. jianfengensis Zhang, Hu & Han, 2011 — China
- A. jinsi Jäger, 2012 — China
- A. jucunda (Thorell, 1897) — Myanmar
- A. lineata Simon, 1897 — Ivory Coast, Congo
- A. lycosina (Simon, 1897) — West Africa
- A. mamma Karsch, 1884 — West, Central, East Africa
- A. maolan Zhu, Chen & Song, 1999 — China, Taiwan
- A. nathani Strand, 1907 — Bahama Is.
- A. pallida (L. Koch, 1875) — Egypt, Ethiopia
- A. popa Jäger & Minn, 2015 — Myanmar
- A. punctata (Thorell, 1890) — Indonesia (Sumatra)
- A. punctulata (Hentz, 1844) — USA
- A. pygmaea Benoit, 1977 — Ivory Coast
- A. samplexa Yin, Tang & Gong, 2000 — China, Korea
- A. similis Caporiacco, 1947 — Central, East Africa
- A. smythiesi (Simon, 1897) — India
- A. syriaca (O. Pickard-Cambridge, 1872) — Cyprus, Israel
- A. wuyiensis Li, Jin & Zhang, 2014 — China
- A. zoroides Schmidt & Krause, 1994 — Comoros

=== Apolania ===
Apolania Simon, 1898

- A. segmentata Simon, 1898 (type) — Seychelles

=== Arctenus ===
Arctenus Polotow & Jocqué, 2014

- A. taitensis Polotow & Jocqué, 2014 (type) — Kenya

=== Asthenoctenus ===
Asthenoctenus Simon, 1897

- A. borellii Simon, 1897 (type) — Brazil, Uruguay, Paraguay, Argentina
- A. bulimus (Strand, 1909) — Brazil
- A. hingstoni (Mello-Leitão, 1948) — Guyana
- A. longistylus Brescovit & Simó, 1998 — Brazil
- A. tarsalis (F. O. Pickard-Cambridge, 1902) — Brazil
- A. tigrinus Mello-Leitão, 1938 — Argentina

== B ==
=== Bengalla ===
Bengalla Gray & Thompson, 2001

- B. bertmaini Gray & Thompson, 2001 (type) — Australia (Western Australia)

=== Bulboctenus ===
Bulboctenus Pereira, Labarque & Polotow, 2020

- B. itunaitata Pereira, Labarque & Polotow, 2020 — Brazil
- B. kayapo Pereira, Labarque & Polotow, 2020 (type) — Brazil
- B. munduruku Pereira, Labarque & Polotow, 2020 — Brazil

== C ==
=== Califorctenus ===
Califorctenus Jiménez, Berrian, Polotow & Palacios-Cardiel, 2017

- C. cacachilensis Jiménez, Berrian, Polotow & Palacios-Cardiel, 2017 (type) — Mexico

=== Caloctenus ===
Caloctenus Keyserling, 1877

- C. abyssinicus Strand, 1917 — Ethiopia
- C. aculeatus Keyserling, 1877 (type) — Colombia
- C. albertoi Hazzi & Silva-Dávila, 2012 — Colombia
- C. carbonera Silva-Dávila, 2004 — Venezuela
- C. gracilitarsis Simon, 1897 — Venezuela
- C. oxapampa Silva-Dávila, 2004 — Peru

=== Celaetycheus ===
Celaetycheus Simon, 1897

- C. abara Polotow & Brescovit, 2013 — Brazil
- C. aberem Polotow & Brescovit, 2013 — Brazil
- C. acaraje Polotow & Brescovit, 2013 — Brazil
- C. beiju Polotow & Brescovit, 2013 — Brazil
- C. bobo Polotow & Brescovit, 2013 — Brazil
- C. caruru Polotow & Brescovit, 2013 — Brazil
- C. flavostriatus Simon, 1897 (type) — Brazil
- C. moqueca Polotow & Brescovit, 2013 — Brazil
- C. mungunza Polotow & Brescovit, 2013 — Brazil
- C. vatapa Polotow & Brescovit, 2013 — Brazil

=== Centroctenus ===
Centroctenus Mello-Leitão, 1929

- C. acara Brescovit, 1996 — Brazil
- C. alinahui Brescovit, Torres, Rego & Polotow, 2020 — Ecuador
- C. auberti (Caporiacco, 1954) — Venezuela, Brazil, French Guiana
- C. chalkidisi Brescovit, Torres, Rego & Polotow, 2020 — Brazil
- C. claudia Brescovit, Torres, Rego & Polotow, 2020 — Brazil
- C. coloso Brescovit, Torres, Rego & Polotow, 2020 — Colombia
- C. dourados Brescovit, Torres, Rego & Polotow, 2020 — Brezil
- C. irupana Brescovit, 1996 — Bolivia
- C. miriuma Brescovit, 1996 — Brazil
- C. ocelliventer (Strand, 1909) (type) — Colombia, Brazil
- C. varzea Brescovit, Torres, Rego & Polotow, 2020 — Brazil

=== Chococtenus ===
Chococtenus Dupérré, 2015

- C. acanthoctenoides (Schmidt, 1956) — Ecuador
- C. cappuccino Dupérré, 2015 — Ecuador
- C. cuchilla Dupérré, 2015 — Ecuador
- C. duendecito Dupérré, 2015 — Ecuador
- C. fantasma Dupérré, 2015 — Ecuador
- C. kashakara Dupérré, 2015 — Ecuador
- C. lasdamas Dupérré, 2015 — Ecuador
- C. luchoi Dupérré, 2015 — Ecuador
- C. miserabilis (Strand, 1916) — Colombia
- C. neblina Dupérré, 2015 — Ecuador
- C. otonga Dupérré, 2015 (type) — Ecuador
- C. otongachi Dupérré, 2015 — Ecuador
- C. piemontana Dupérré, 2015 — Ecuador
- C. suffuscus Dupérré, 2015 — Ecuador
- C. waitti Dupérré, 2015 — Ecuador

=== Ciba ===
Ciba Bloom, Binford, Esposito, Alayón, Peterson, Nishida, Loubet-Senear & Agnarsson, 2014

- C. calzada (Alayón, 1985) (type) — Cuba
- C. seibo Alayón & Agnarsson, 2014 — Dominican Rep.

=== Ctenus ===
Ctenus

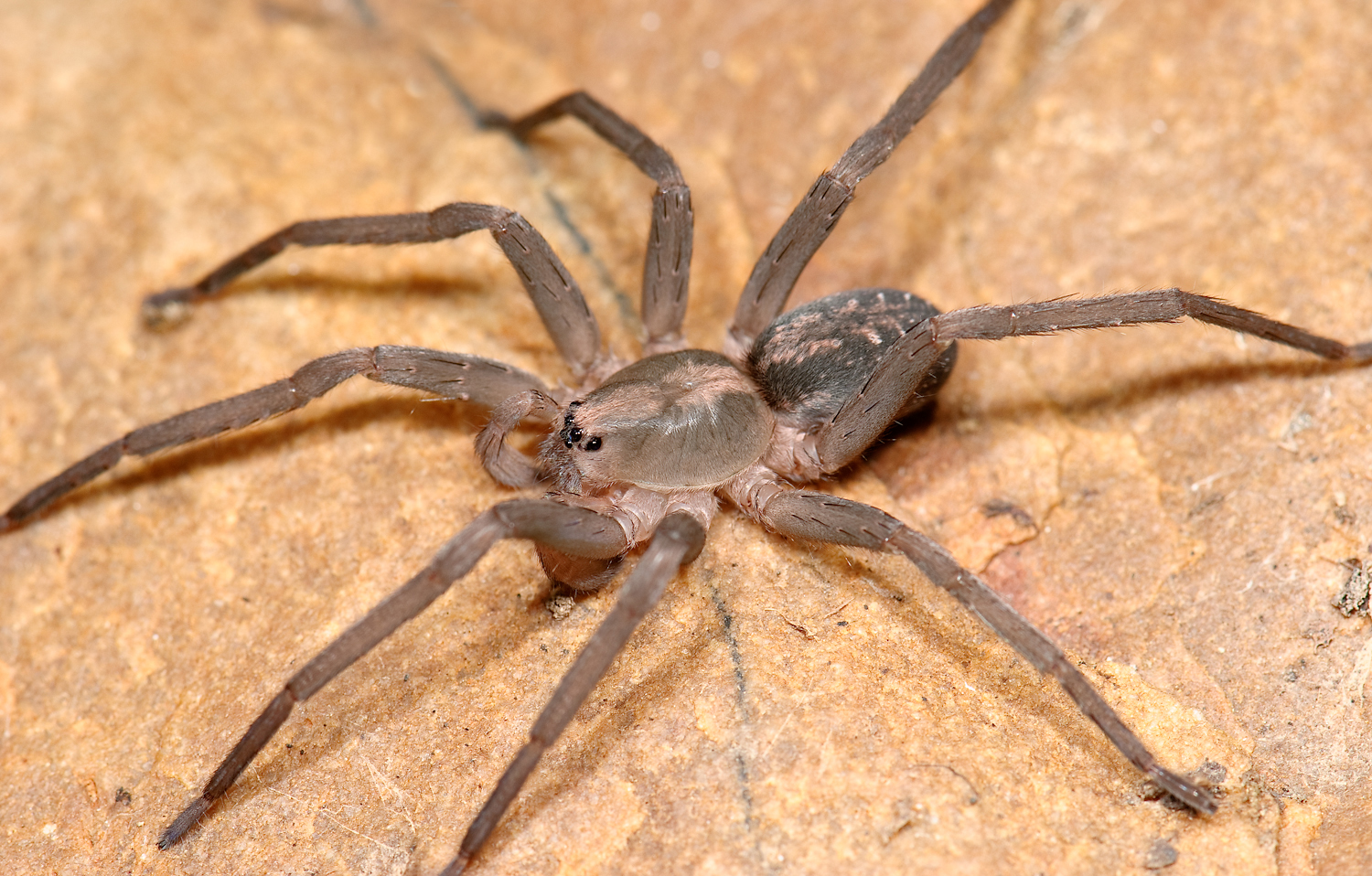
Ctenus exlineae, male

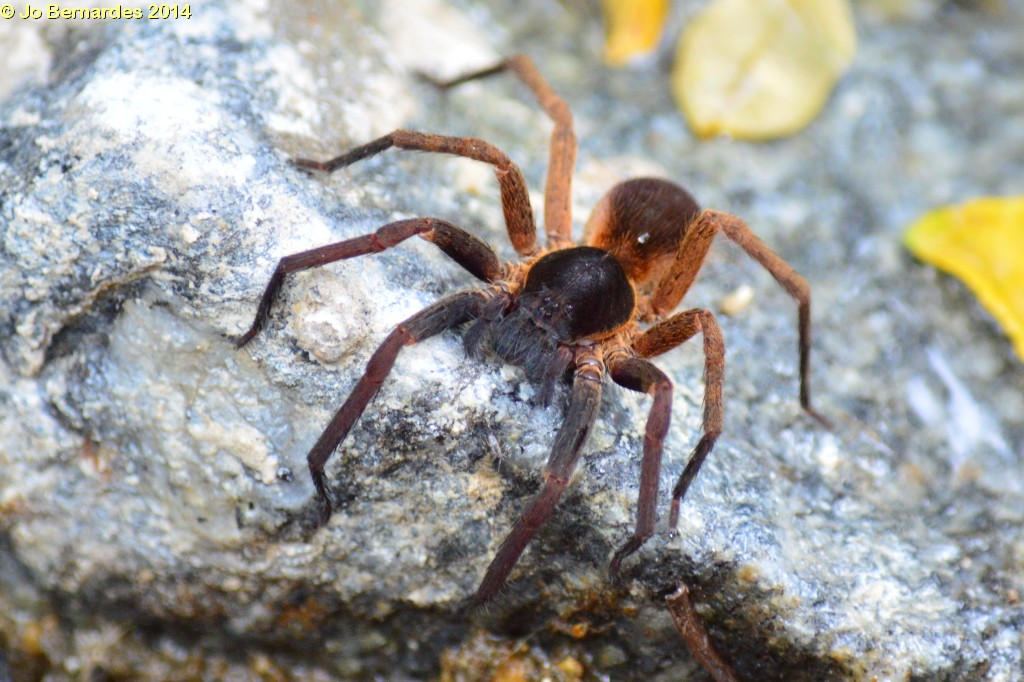
Ctenus medius

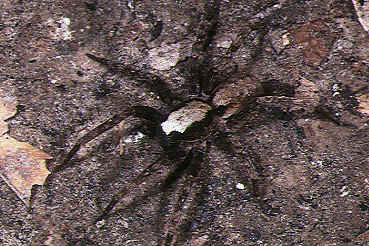
Ctenus yaeyamensis, male

Ctenus Walckenaer, 1805

- C. abditus Arts, 1912 — Congo, Tanzania
- C. adustus (Keyserling, 1877) — Colombia
- C. agroecoides (Thorell, 1881) — Australia (Queensland)
- C. albofasciatus F. O. Pickard-Cambridge, 1897 — Brazil
- C. alienus F. O. Pickard-Cambridge, 1900 — Guatemala
- C. amanensis Strand, 1907 — East Africa
- C. amphora Mello-Leitão, 1930 — Colombia, Brazil, Guyana
- C. anahitaeformis Benoit, 1981 — Burundi
- C. anahitiformis Strand, 1909 — Brazil
- C. andamanensis Gravely, 1931 — India
- C. angigitanus Roewer, 1938 — New Guinea
- C. angularis Roewer, 1938 — Indonesia (Aru Is.)
- C. argentipes Hasselt, 1893 — Indonesia (Sumatra)
- C. aruanus Strand, 1911 — Indonesia (Aru Is.)
- C. auricomus Arts, 1912 — Central, East Africa
- C. avidus Bryant, 1948 — Hispaniola
- C. bahamensis Strand, 1907 — Bahama Is.
- C. bantaengi Merian, 1911 — Indonesia (Sulawesi)
- C. barbatus Thorell, 1895 — Myanmar
- C. bayeri Jäger, 2012 — Laos
- C. bicolor (Bertkau, 1880) — Brazil
- C. bicostatus Thorell, 1890 — Borneo
- C. bigibbosus Benoit, 1980 — Congo
- C. bilobatus F. O. Pickard-Cambridge, 1900 — Mexico
- C. blumenauensis Strand, 1909 — Brazil
- C. bolivicola Strand, 1907 — Bolivia
- C. bomdilaensis Tikader & Malhotra, 1981 — India
- C. bowonglangi Merian, 1911 — Indonesia (Sulawesi)
- C. bueanus Strand, 1916 — Cameroon
- C. calcaratus F. O. Pickard-Cambridge, 1900 — Guatemala
- C. calcarifer F. O. Pickard-Cambridge, 1902 — Borneo
- C. calderitas Alayón, 2002 — Mexico
- C. caligineus Arts, 1912 — Central, East Africa
- C. captiosus Gertsch, 1935 — USA
- C. capulinus (Karsch, 1879) — West, Central Africa
- C. catherine Polotow & Brescovit, 2012 — Jamaica
- C. cavaticus Arts, 1912 — Congo, Angola
- C. celebensis Pocock, 1897 — Indonesia (Sulawesi)
- C. celisi Benoit, 1981 — Congo
- C. ceylonensis F. O. Pickard-Cambridge, 1897 — Sri Lanka
- C. cladarus Jäger, 2012 — Myanmar
- C. coccineipes Pocock, 1903 — West, Central Africa
- C. cochinensis Gravely, 1931 — India
- C. colombianus Mello-Leitão, 1941 — Colombia
- C. colonicus Arts, 1912 — East Africa
- C. complicatus Franganillo, 1946 — Cuba
- C. constrictus Benoit, 1981 — Congo
- C. convexus F. O. Pickard-Cambridge, 1900 — Mexico to Costa Rica
- C. corniger F. O. Pickard-Cambridge, 1898 — South Africa
- C. cruciatus Franganillo, 1930 — Cuba
- C. crulsi Mello-Leitão, 1930 — Brazil
- C. dangsus Reddy & Patel, 1994 — India
- C. darlingtoni Bryant, 1948 — Hispaniola
- C. datus Strand, 1909 — Ecuador
- C. decemnotatus Simon, 1909 — Guinea-Bissau
- C. decorus (Gerstaecker, 1873) — East Africa
- C. delesserti (Caporiacco, 1947) — Guyana
- C. denticulatus Benoit, 1981 — Congo
- C. dilucidus Simon, 1909 — Congo
- C. doloensis Caporiacco, 1940 — Ethiopia
- C. drassoides (Karsch, 1879) — Colombia
- C. dreyeri Strand, 1906 — Cameroon
- C. dubius Walckenaer, 1805 (type) — French Guiana
- C. efferatus Arts, 1912 — Congo
- C. elgonensis Benoit, 1978 — Kenya
- C. ellacomei F. O. Pickard-Cambridge, 1902 — Suriname
- C. embolus Benoit, 1981 — Congo
- C. ensiger F. O. Pickard-Cambridge, 1900 — Mexico
- C. esculentus Arts, 1912 — Cameroon, Congo
- C. excavatus F. O. Pickard-Cambridge, 1900 — Mexico
- C. exlineae Peck, 1981 — USA
- C. facetus Arts, 1912 — Congo, East Africa
- C. falcatus F. O. Pickard-Cambridge, 1902 — St. Lucia
- C. falciformis Benoit, 1981 — Congo
- C. falconensis Schenkel, 1953 — Venezuela
- C. fasciatus Mello-Leitão, 1943 — Brazil
- C. fernandae Brescovit & Simó, 2007 — Brazil
- C. feshius Benoit, 1979 — Congo
- C. flavidus Hogg, 1922 — Vietnam
- C. floweri F. O. Pickard-Cambridge, 1897 — Malaysia
- C. goaensis Bastawade & Borkar, 2008 — India
- C. guantanamo (Alayón, 2001) — Cuba
- C. gulosus Arts, 1912 — South Africa
- C. haina Alayón, 2004 — Hispaniola
- C. haitiensis Strand, 1909 — Hispaniola
- C. hibernalis Hentz, 1844 — USA
- C. hiemalis Bryant, 1948 — Hispaniola
- C. himalayensis Gravely, 1931 — India
- C. holmi Benoit, 1978 — Kenya
- C. holthoffi Jäger, 2012 — Laos
- C. hosei F. O. Pickard-Cambridge, 1897 — Borneo
- C. humilis (Keyserling, 1887) — Nicaragua
- C. hygrophilus Benoit, 1977 — Congo
- C. idjwiensis Benoit, 1979 — Congo
- C. inaja Höfer, Brescovit & Gasnier, 1994 — Colombia, Peru, Bolivia, Brazil
- C. indicus Gravely, 1931 — India
- C. insulanus Bryant, 1948 — Hispaniola
- C. jaminauensis Mello-Leitão, 1936 — Brazil
- C. jaragua Alayón, 2004 — Hispaniola
- C. javanus Pocock, 1897 — Indonesia (Java)
- C. kandyensis Kim & Ye, 2014 — Sri Lanka
- C. kapuri Tikader, 1973 — India (Andaman Is.)
- C. kenyamontanus Benoit, 1978 — Kenya
- C. kipatimus Benoit, 1981 — Tanzania
- C. kochi Simon, 1897 — New Guinea
- C. lacertus Benoit, 1979 — Congo
- C. latitabundus Arts, 1912 — Central, East Africa
- C. lejeunei Benoit, 1977 — Congo
- C. leonardi Simon, 1909 — West Africa
- C. levipes Arts, 1912 — Tanzania
- C. lishuqiang Jäger, 2012 — China
- C. longicalcar Kraus, 1955 — El Salvador
- C. lubwensis Benoit, 1979 — Congo
- C. macellarius Simon, 1909 — Congo
- C. maculatus Franganillo, 1931 — Cuba
- C. maculisternis Strand, 1909 — Bolivia, Brazil
- C. magnificus Arts, 1912 — West Africa
- C. malvernensis Petrunkevitch, 1910 — Jamaica
- C. manauara Höfer, Brescovit & Gasnier, 1994 — Brazil
- C. manni Bryant, 1948 — Hispaniola
- C. marginatus Walckenaer, 1847 — Fiji, Solomon Is.
- C. martensi Jäger, 2012 — Nepal
- C. medius Keyserling, 1891 — Panama, Brazil
- C. meghalayaensis Tikader, 1976 — India
- C. minimus F. O. Pickard-Cambridge, 1897 — North America
- C. minor F. O. Pickard-Cambridge, 1897 — Brazil
- C. mitchelli Gertsch, 1971 — Mexico
- C. modestus Simon, 1897 — Tanzania (Zanzibar, Kenya)
- C. monaghani Jäger, 2013 — Laos
- C. monticola Bryant, 1948 — Hispaniola
- C. musosanus Benoit, 1979 — Congo
- C. naranjo Alayón, 2004 — Hispaniola
- C. narashinhai Patel & Reddy, 1988 — India
- C. natmataung Jäger & Minn, 2015 — Myanmar
- C. nigritarsis (Pavesi, 1897) — Ethiopia
- C. nigritus F. O. Pickard-Cambridge, 1897 — Brazil
- C. nigrolineatus Berland, 1913 — Ecuador
- C. nigromaculatus Thorell, 1899 — Central, West Africa
- C. noctuabundus Arts, 1912 — Kenya
- C. obscurus (Keyserling, 1877) — Colombia
- C. oligochronius Arts, 1912 — East Africa
- C. ornatus (Keyserling, 1877) — Brazil
- C. ottleyi (Petrunkevitch, 1930) — Puerto Rico
- C. palembangensis Strand, 1906 — Indonesia (Sumatra)
- C. paranus Strand, 1909 — Brazil
- C. parvoculatus Benoit, 1979 — South Africa
- C. parvus (Keyserling, 1877) — Colombia
- C. paubrasil Brescovit & Simó, 2007 — Brazil
- C. pauloterrai Brescovit & Simó, 2007 — Brazil
- C. peregrinus F. O. Pickard-Cambridge, 1900 — Guatemala, Costa Rica
- C. periculosus Bristowe, 1931 — Indonesia (Krakatau)
- C. philippinensis F. O. Pickard-Cambridge, 1897 — Philippines
- C. pilosus Franganillo, 1930 — Cuba
- C. pingu Jäger & Minn, 2015 — Myanmar
- C. pogonias Thorell, 1899 — Cameroon
- C. polli Hasselt, 1893 — Indonesia (Sumatra)
- C. potteri Simon, 1901 — Ethiopia, Equatorial Guinea (Bioko)
- C. pulchriventris (Simon, 1897) — Zimbabwe, South Africa
- C. pulvinatus Thorell, 1890 — Borneo
- C. racenisi Caporiacco, 1955 — Venezuela
- C. ramosi Alayón, 2002 — Cuba
- C. ramosus Thorell, 1887 — Myanmar
- C. ravidus (Simon, 1886) — Argentina
- C. rectipes F. O. Pickard-Cambridge, 1897 — Brazil, Guyana
- C. renivulvatus Strand, 1906 — Ghana
- C. rivulatus Pocock, 1900 — Cameroon, Gabon
- C. robustus Thorell, 1897 — Myanmar, Laos
- C. rubripes Keyserling, 1881 — Panama, Ecuador
- C. rufisternis Pocock, 1898 — Papua New Guinea (New Britain)
- C. rwandanus Benoit, 1981 — Rwanda
- C. saci Ono, 2010 — Vietnam
- C. sagittatus Giltay, 1935 — Indonesia (Sulawesi)
- C. saltensis Strand, 1909 — Argentina, Bolivia
- C. sarawakensis F. O. Pickard-Cambridge, 1897 — Borneo
- C. satanas Strand, 1909 — Ecuador
- C. serratipes F. O. Pickard-Cambridge, 1897 — Venezuela, Guyana, Brazil
- C. serrichelis Mello-Leitão, 1922 — Brazil
- C. sexmaculatus Roewer, 1961 — Senegal
- C. siankaan Alayón, 2002 — Mexico
- C. sigma (Schenkel, 1953) — Venezuela
- C. sikkimensis Gravely, 1931 — India
- C. silvaticus Benoit, 1981 — Congo
- C. similis F. O. Pickard-Cambridge, 1897 — Brazil
- C. simplex Thorell, 1897 — Myanmar, Laos
- C. somaliensis Benoit, 1979 — Somalia
- C. spectabilis Lessert, 1921 — Central, East Africa
- C. spiculus F. O. Pickard-Cambridge, 1897 — Colombia
- C. spiralis F. O. Pickard-Cambridge, 1900 — Costa Rica
- C. supinus F. O. Pickard-Cambridge, 1900 — Costa Rica
- C. tenuipes Denis, 1955 — Guinea
- C. theodorianum Jäger, 2012 — Laos
- C. thorelli F. O. Pickard-Cambridge, 1897 — Sri Lanka
- C. torvus Pavesi, 1883 — Ethiopia
- C. transvaalensis Benoit, 1981 — South Africa
- C. trinidensis (Alayón, 2001) — Trinidad
- C. tumidulus (Simon, 1887) — Myanmar
- C. tuniensis Patel & Reddy, 1988 — India
- C. uluguruensis Benoit, 1979 — Tanzania
- C. undulatus Steyn & Van der Donckt, 2003 — Ivory Coast
- C. unilineatus Simon, 1898 — St. Vincent
- C. vagus Blackwall, 1866 — West Africa
- C. validus Denis, 1955 — Guinea
- C. valverdiensis Peck, 1981 — USA
- C. valvularis (Hasselt, 1882) — Indonesia (Java, Sumatra)
- C. vatovae Caporiacco, 1940 — Ethiopia
- C. vehemens Keyserling, 1891 — Brazil
- C. vespertilio Mello-Leitão, 1941 — Colombia
- C. villasboasi Mello-Leitão, 1949 — Colombia, Ecuador, Brazil
- C. vividus Blackwall, 1865 — Central Africa
- C. w-notatus Petrunkevitch, 1925 — Panama
- C. walckenaeri Griffith, 1833 — possibly South America
- C. yaeyamensis Yoshida, 1998 — Taiwan, Japan

== D ==
=== Diallomus ===
Diallomus Simon, 1897

- D. fuliginosus Simon, 1897 (type) — Sri Lanka
- D. speciosus Simon, 1897 — Sri Lanka

== E ==
=== Enoploctenus ===
Enoploctenus Simon, 1897

- E. cyclothorax (Bertkau, 1880) (type) — Brazil
- E. distinctus (Caporiacco, 1947) — Guyana
- E. inazensis (Strand, 1909) — Ecuador
- E. luteovittatus (Simon, 1898) — St. Vincent
- E. maculipes Strand, 1909 — Brazil
- E. morbidus Mello-Leitão, 1939 — Brazil
- E. pedatissimus Strand, 1909 — Ecuador, Brazil
- E. penicilliger (Simon, 1898) — St. Vincent

== G ==
=== Gephyroctenus ===
Gephyroctenus Mello-Leitão, 1936

- G. acre Polotow & Brescovit, 2008 — Brazil
- G. atininga Polotow & Brescovit, 2008 — Brazil
- G. divisor Polotow & Brescovit, 2008 — Brazil
- G. esteio Polotow & Brescovit, 2008 — Brazil
- G. juruti Polotow & Brescovit, 2008 — Peru, Brazil
- G. kolosvaryi Caporiacco, 1947 — Guyana
- G. mapia Polotow & Brescovit, 2008 — Brazil
- G. panguana Polotow & Brescovit, 2008 — Peru
- G. philodromoides Mello-Leitão, 1936 (type) — Peru, Brazil
- G. portovelho Polotow & Brescovit, 2008 — Brazil

=== Guasuctenus ===
Guasuctenus Polotow & Brescovit, 2019

- G. longipes (Keyserling, 1891) (type) — Brazil, Uruguay
- G. vittatissimus (Strand, 1916) — Brazil

== I ==
=== Isoctenus ===
Isoctenus Bertkau, 1880

- I. areia Polotow & Brescovit, 2009 — Brazil
- I. charada Polotow & Brescovit, 2009 — Brazil
- I. corymbus Polotow, Brescovit & Pellegatti-Franco, 2005 — Brazil
- I. coxalis (F. O. Pickard-Cambridge, 1902) — Brazil
- I. eupalaestrus Mello-Leitão, 1936 — Brazil
- I. foliifer Bertkau, 1880 (type) — Brazil
- I. griseolus (Mello-Leitão, 1936) — Brazil
- I. guadalupei (Mello-Leitão, 1941) — Argentina
- I. herteli (Mello-Leitão, 1947) — Brazil
- I. janeirus (Walckenaer, 1837) — Brazil
- I. malabaris Polotow, Brescovit & Ott, 2007 — Brazil
- I. minusculus (Keyserling, 1891) — Brazil
- I. ordinario Polotow & Brescovit, 2009 — Brazil, Argentina
- I. segredo Polotow & Brescovit, 2009 — Brazil
- I. strandi Mello-Leitão, 1936 — Brazil
- I. taperae (Mello-Leitão, 1936) — Brazil

== J ==
=== Janusia ===
Janusia Gray, 1973

- J. muiri Gray, 1973 (type) — Australia (Western Australia)

== K ==
=== Kiekie ===
Kiekie Polotow & Brescovit, 2018

- K. antioquia Polotow & Brescovit, 2018 — Colombia
- K. barrocolorado Polotow & Brescovit, 2018 — Panama
- K. curvipes (Keyserling, 1881) — Mexico, Guatemala, Honduras, Nicaragua, Costa Rica, Panama
- K. garifuna Polotow & Brescovit, 2018 — Guatemala, Honduras
- K. griswoldi Polotow & Brescovit, 2018 — Costa Rica
- K. montanensis Polotow & Brescovit, 2018 — Costa Rica, Panama
- K. panamensis Polotow & Brescovit, 2018 — Panama
- K. sanjose Polotow & Brescovit, 2018 — Costa Rica
- K. sarapiqui Polotow & Brescovit, 2018 — Costa Rica
- K. sinuatipes (F. O. Pickard-Cambridge, 1897) (type) — Panama, Costa Rica
- K. verbena Polotow & Brescovit, 2018 — Costa Rica

== L ==
=== Leptoctenus ===
Leptoctenus L. Koch, 1878

- L. agalenoides L. Koch, 1878 (type) — Australia
- L. byrrhus Simon, 1888 — USA, Mexico
- L. daoxianensis Yin, Tang & Gong, 2000 — China
- L. gertschi Peck, 1981 — Mexico
- L. paradoxus (F. O. Pickard-Cambridge, 1900) — Panama
- L. sonoraensis Peck, 1981 — Mexico

== M ==
=== Macroctenus ===
Macroctenus Henrard & Jocqué, 2017

- M. herbicola Henrard & Jocqué, 2017 — Guinea
- M. kingsleyi (F. O. Pickard-Cambridge, 1898) (type) — West, Central Africa
- M. nimba Henrard & Jocqué, 2017 — Guinea
- M. occidentalis (F. O. Pickard-Cambridge, 1898) — West Africa
- M. vandenspiegeli Henrard & Jocqué, 2017 — Guinea

=== Mahafalytenus ===
Mahafalytenus Silva-Dávila, 2007

- M. fo Silva-Dávila, 2007 — Madagascar
- M. fohy Silva-Dávila, 2007 — Madagascar
- M. hafa Silva-Dávila, 2007 — Madagascar
- M. isalo Silva-Dávila, 2007 — Madagascar
- M. osy Silva-Dávila, 2007 — Madagascar
- M. paosy Silva-Dávila, 2007 — Madagascar
- M. tsilo Silva-Dávila, 2007 (type) — Madagascar

=== Montescueia ===
Montescueia Carcavallo & Martínez, 1961

- M. leitaoi Carcavallo & Martínez, 1961 (type) — Argentina

== N ==
=== † Nanoctenus ===
† Nanoctenus Wunderlich, 1988

- † N. longipes Wunderlich, 1988

=== Nimbanahita ===
Nimbanahita Henrard & Jocqué, 2017

- N. montivaga Henrard & Jocqué, 2017 (type) — Guinea

=== Nothroctenus ===
Nothroctenus Badcock, 1932

- N. bahiensis Mello-Leitão, 1936 — Brazil
- N. fuxico Dias & Brescovit, 2004 — Brazil
- N. lineatus (Tullgren, 1905) — Bolivia
- N. marshi (F. O. Pickard-Cambridge, 1897) — Brazil, Paraguay, Bolivia
- N. omega (Mello-Leitão, 1929) — Brazil
- N. sericeus (Mello-Leitão, 1929) — Brazil
- N. spinulosus (Mello-Leitão, 1929) — Brazil
- N. stupidus Badcock, 1932 (type) — Paraguay

== O ==
=== Ohvida ===
Ohvida Polotow & Brescovit, 2009

- O. andros Polotow & Brescovit, 2009 — Bahama Is.
- O. bimini Polotow & Brescovit, 2009 — Bahama Is.
- O. brevitarsus (Bryant, 1940) — Cuba
- O. coxana (Bryant, 1940) — Cuba
- O. fulvorufa (Franganillo, 1930) (type) — Cuba
- O. isolata (Bryant, 1940) — Cuba
- O. modesta (Bryant, 1942) — Puerto Rico
- O. turquino Polotow & Brescovit, 2009 — Cuba
- O. vernalis (Bryant, 1940) — Cuba

== P ==
=== Perictenus ===
Perictenus Henrard & Jocqué, 2017

- P. molecula Henrard & Jocqué, 2017 (type) — Guinea

=== Petaloctenus ===
Petaloctenus Jocqué & Steyn, 1997

- P. bossema Jocqué & Steyn, 1997 (type) — Ivory Coast
- P. clathratus (Thorell, 1899) — Cameroon
- P. cupido Van der Donckt & Jocqué, 2001 — Guinea
- P. lunatus Van der Donckt & Jocqué, 2001 — Nigeria
- P. songan Jocqué & Steyn, 1997 — Ivory Coast

=== Phoneutria ===
Phoneutria

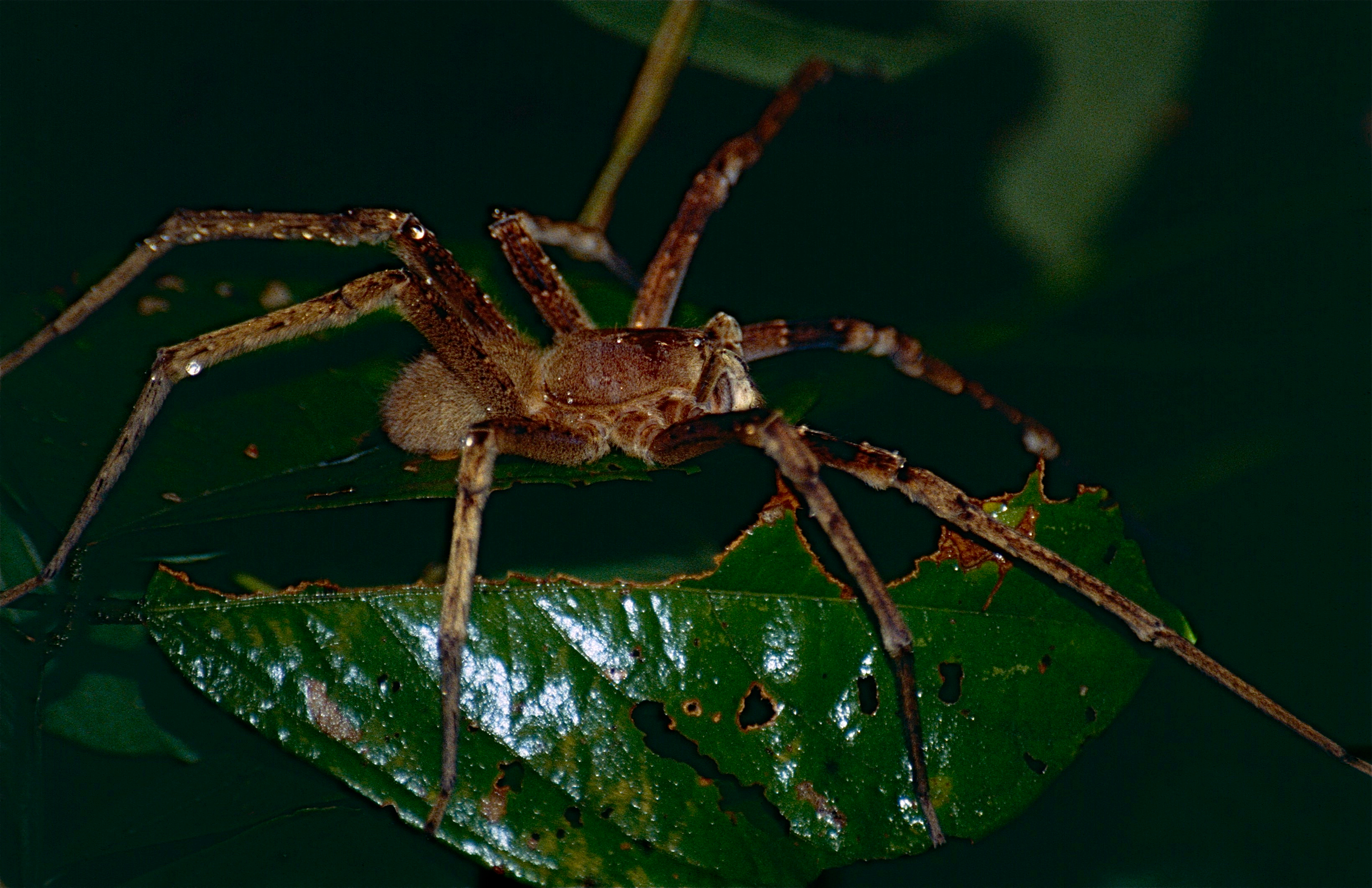
Brazilian Wandering Spider
(Phoneutria fera)

Phoneutria Perty, 1833

- P. bahiensis Simó & Brescovit, 2001 — Brazil
- P. boliviensis (F. O. Pickard-Cambridge, 1897) — Central, South America
- P. eickstedtae Martins & Bertani, 2007 — Brazil
- P. fera Perty, 1833 (type) — Colombia, Ecuador, Peru, Brazil, Suriname, Guyana
- P. keyserlingi (F. O. Pickard-Cambridge, 1897) — Brazil
- P. nigriventer (Keyserling, 1891) — Brazil, Uruguay, Paraguay, Argentina
- P. pertyi (F. O. Pickard-Cambridge, 1897) — Brazil
- P. reidyi (F. O. Pickard-Cambridge, 1897) — Colombia, Venezuela, Peru, Brazil, Guyana

=== Phymatoctenus ===
Phymatoctenus Simon, 1897

- P. comosus Simon, 1897 (type) — Brazil, Guyana
- P. sassii Reimoser, 1939 — Costa Rica
- P. tristani Reimoser, 1939 — Costa Rica

=== Piloctenus ===
Piloctenus Henrard & Jocqué, 2017

- P. gryseelsi Henrard & Jocqué, 2017 — Guinea
- P. haematostoma Jocqué & Henrard, 2017 — Guinea
- P. mirificus (Arts, 1912) — Togo, Ivory Coast, Guinea
- P. pilosus (Thorell, 1899) (type) — West, Central Africa

== S ==
=== Sinoctenus ===
Sinoctenus Marusik, Zhang & Omelko, 2012

- S. zhui Marusik, Zhang & Omelko, 2012 (type) — China

=== Spinoctenus ===
Spinoctenus Hazzi, Polotow, Brescovit, González-Obando & Simó, 2018

- S. chocoensis Hazzi, Polotow, Brescovit, González-Obando & Simó, 2018 — Colombia
- S. eberhardi Hazzi, Polotow, Brescovit, González-Obando & Simó, 2018 — Colombia
- S. escalerete Hazzi, Polotow, Brescovit, González-Obando & Simó, 2018 — Colombia
- S. flammigerus Hazzi, Polotow, Brescovit, González-Obando & Simó, 2018 — Colombia
- S. florezi Hazzi, Polotow, Brescovit, González-Obando & Simó, 2018 — Colombia
- S. ginae Víquez, 2020 — Costa Rica (Cocos Is.)
- S. nambi Hazzi, Polotow, Brescovit, González-Obando & Simó, 2018 — Colombia
- S. pericos Hazzi, Polotow, Brescovit, González-Obando & Simó, 2018 — Colombia
- S. spinosus Hazzi, Polotow, Brescovit, González-Obando & Simó, 2018 — Colombia
- S. stephaniae Hazzi, Polotow, Brescovit, González-Obando & Simó, 2018 — Colombia
- S. tequendama Hazzi, Polotow, Brescovit, González-Obando & Simó, 2018 — Colombia
- S. yotoco Hazzi, Polotow, Brescovit, González-Obando & Simó, 2018 (type) — Colombia

== T ==
=== Thoriosa ===
Thoriosa Simon, 1909

- T. fulvastra Simon, 1909 (type) — São Tomé and Príncipe, Sierra Leone
- T. spadicea (Simon, 1909) — São Tomé and Príncipe
- T. spinivulva (Simon, 1909) — São Tomé and Príncipe
- T. taurina (Simon, 1909) — São Tomé and Príncipe, Equatorial Guinea (Annobon Is.)

=== Toca ===
Toca Polotow & Brescovit, 2009

- T. bossanova Polotow & Brescovit, 2009 (type) — Brazil
- T. samba Polotow & Brescovit, 2009 — Brazil

=== Trogloctenus ===
Trogloctenus Lessert, 1935

- T. briali Ledoux, 2004 — Réunion
- T. fagei (Lessert, 1935) (type) — Congo

=== Trujillina ===
Trujillina Bryant, 1948

- T. hursti (Bryant, 1948) — Hispaniola
- T. isolata (Bryant, 1942) — Puerto Rico
- T. spinipes Bryant, 1948 (type) — Hispaniola

=== Tuticanus ===
Tuticanus Simon, 1897

- T. cruciatus Simon, 1897 (type) — Ecuador
- T. major (Keyserling, 1879) — Peru

== V ==
=== Viracucha ===
Viracucha Lehtinen, 1967

- V. andicola (Simon, 1906) (type) — Bolivia
- V. exilis (Mello-Leitão, 1936) — Brazil
- V. mammifer (Mello-Leitão, 1939) — Brazil
- V. misionesicus (Mello-Leitão, 1945) — Argentina
- V. paraguayensis (Strand, 1909) — Brazil, Paraguay
- V. ridleyi (F. O. Pickard-Cambridge, 1897) — Brazil
- V. silvicola (Soares & Soares, 1946) — Brazil

== W ==
=== Wiedenmeyeria ===
Wiedenmeyeria Schenkel, 1953

- W. falconensis Schenkel, 1953 (type) — Venezuela
