= Toca =

Toca may refer to:

- Toca, Boyacá, a municipality in Boyacá Department, Colombia
- TOCA, organisers and administrators of the British Touring Car Championship
- TOCA (series), a racing video game series
- Toca (album), an album from German dance project Fragma
- Toca (spider), a genus of South American spiders
- Toca, an alternative name used in Italy for the wine grape Sauvignon vert
- Toca, an alternative name for the Hungarian wine grape Furmint

== See also ==
- "Toca-Toca", 2014 single by Romanian band Fly Project
