= Acanthocyte (disambiguation) =

Acanthocyte is a form of red blood cell that has a spiked cell membrane, due to abnormal thorny projections.

Acanthocyte may also refer to:

- Acanthocyte (mycology), stellate cells found on the hyphae of fungi of the genus Stropharia

== See also ==
- Neuroacanthocytosis, neurological conditions in which the blood contains acanthocytes
- Acanthosis, thickening of the skin not connected to acanthocytes
- Acanthoctenus, a genus of spiders
