= Sierra de las Cacachilas =

Mountain range in Mexico

- Location within Baja California Sur

Highest point
- Peak: Cerro del Puerto
- Elevation: 1,260 m (4,130 ft)
- Coordinates: 24.114°N 110.171°W

Geography
- Country: Mexico
- State: Baja California Sur
- Municipality: La Paz Municipality

The Sierra de las Cacachilas is a mountain range of eastern Baja California Sur state, located on the southern Baja California Peninsula in northwestern Mexico.

It is a mountain range of the Peninsular Ranges System, which extends 1,500 km (930 mi) from Southern California, through the Baja California Peninsula in Baja California and Baja California Sur states.

== Geography ==
The Sierra de las Cacahilas lie just east of La Paz near the Pichilingue Peninsula on the Sea of Cortez side of the southeastern Baja California Peninsula. Prominent hills include Cerro del Puerto, 1,260 metres (4,130 ft) in elevation, and Cerro de las Cienaga.

=== Natural history ===
Much of the flora and fauna found in the Sierra de las Cacahilas are considered endemic to the region, and a binational research team identified several species in 2013 that had only been found in the Sierra de la Laguna, 40 miles (64 km) to the south, and discovered a new species of spider, later named Califorctenus cacachilensis.

== See also ==
- Flora of Baja California Sur
- Peninsular Ranges topics
