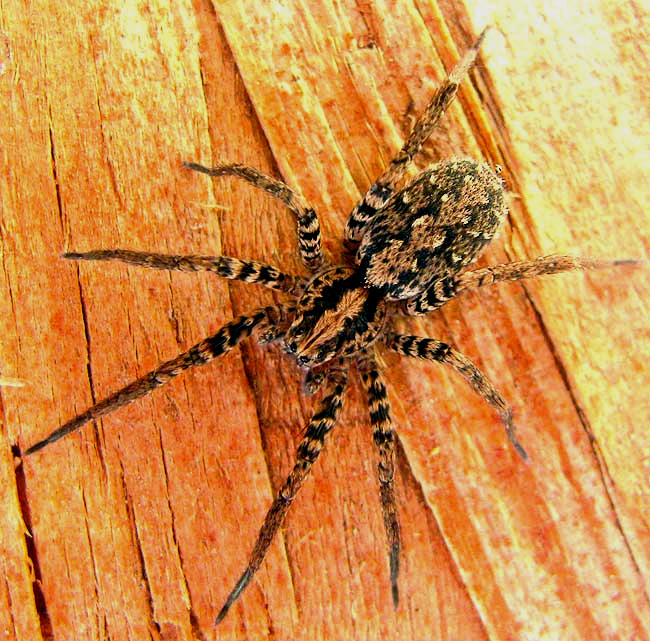
- Leptoctenus byrrhus

Scientific classification
- Kingdom: Animalia
- Phylum: Arthropoda
- Subphylum: Chelicerata
- Class: Arachnida
- Order: Araneae
- Infraorder: Araneomorphae
- Family: Ctenidae
- Genus: Leptoctenus
- Species: L. byrrhus

Binomial name
- Leptoctenus byrrhus Simon (1888)

Synonyms
- Ctenus byrrhus Simon (1888)

= Leptoctenus byrrhus =

Species of spider

Leptoctenus byrrhus is a member of the Wandering Spider family, the Ctenidae.

== Description ==
Leptoctenus byrrhus is a medium-sized, hairy spider with a gray background color and body and legs heavily splotched with dark marks. Atop the cephalothorax and abdomen, the splotches form two irregular, heavy lines running longitudinally; on the legs they appear as dark rings (two or three on each femur), at least when viewed from above.

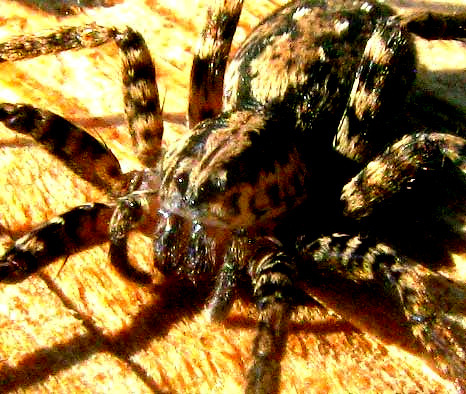
Leptoctenus byrrhus up close

These features resemble those of numerous species in the Wandering Spider Family, as can be seen on the iNaturalist page comparing species of the family. Technical features of Leptoctenus byrrhus, often hard to see without magnification, include the following:

- Body lengths of males are up to about 10.5mm (~ 7/16 inch long, while females reach approximately 13.5mm (~½ inch).
- The part of the cephalothorax from which the legs arise, behind the head part, is higher than the head part.
- Each of the spider's two jaws, or chelicerae, bear a fang-like part, the "cheliceral fang," on the back part of which (facing the rear end) there are only three teeth.
- At leg ends, small, dense tufts of hair known as "scopula pads" are moderately developed.
- The pedipalps (leglike appendages beside the jaws and in front of the first pair of walking legs), are segmented similarly to the legs, and as such, on males, the tibia sections, the "male palpal tibia," bear long outgrowths, the "apophyses," on which grow long, curved extensions that bend sharply back toward a hollow structure, the "palpal cymbium," surrounding and protecting the palpal bulb at mid-length.
- The male's palpal tibia are excavated distally from the base of the apophysis.
- The females' external genital structure known as the epigynum is distinct, wider than long, and has a long, narrow neck, with spurs on the side.

== Behavior ==
Leptoctenus byrrhus walks with its front pair of legs held forward as if they were "antennae." Even when at rest, often these legs are held off the ground.

== Habitat ==
Leptoctenus byrrhus has been reported amid detritus, under rocks, at the entrance of a cave, and in a woodrat nest. Images on this page are of a spider found beneath a sheet of plywood lying on the ground.

In the northeastern Mexican city of Ciudad Victoria in the state of Tamaulipas, Leptoctenus byrrhus has been encountered inside people's houses.

== Distribution ==
The GBIF distribution map showing georeferenced observations of Leptoctenus byrrhus indicates that the species occurs in southern Texas and northeastern Mexico.

== Taxonomy ==
The species Leptoctenus byrrhus was first described by Eugène Simon in 1888, on page 210 of the Annales de la Société entomologique de France. His type specimen was from someplace in Mexico.

== Etymology ==
In the genus name Leptoctenus, the lepto- is from the Ancient Greek meaning "slender, thin, narrow, graceful, fine..." The -ctenus is from the Greek cten, meaning "comb." This may refer to the line of fine hairs on the legs, the calamistrum.
