= Bengalla =

Scientific classification
- Domain: Eukaryota
- Kingdom: Animalia
- Phylum: Arthropoda
- Subphylum: Chelicerata
- Class: Arachnida
- Order: Araneae
- Infraorder: Araneomorphae
- Family: Ctenidae
- Genus: Bengalla; Gray & Thompson, 2001
- Species: B. bertmaini

Binomial name
- Bengalla bertmaini Gray & Thompson, 2001

Genus of spiders

Bengalla is a monotypic genus of Australian wandering spiders containing the single species, Bengalla bertmaini. It was first described by Michael R. Gray & Judith A. Thompson in 2001, and has only been found in Australia. It was originally assigned to the superfamily "Lycosoidea", but not to any actual family. In 2003, it was tentatively moved to the Ctenidae because of its apparent relationship to Janusia, another Australian monotypic genus of wandering spiders.
