= Amauropelma monteithi =

Scientific classification
- Kingdom: Animalia
- Phylum: Arthropoda
- Subphylum: Chelicerata
- Class: Arachnida
- Order: Araneae
- Infraorder: Araneomorphae
- Family: Ctenidae
- Genus: Amauropelma
- Species: A. monteithi

Binomial name
- Amauropelma monteithi Raven, & Stumkat, 2001
- Holotype site (QM S31354): Cape Tribulation'"`UNIQ--ref-00000003-QINU`"'

Species of spider

Amauropelma monteithi is a species of wandering spider first described in 2001 by Robert Raven and Kylie S. Stumkat, and found in Queensland.

The species epithet honours the Australian entomologist Geoff Monteith.
