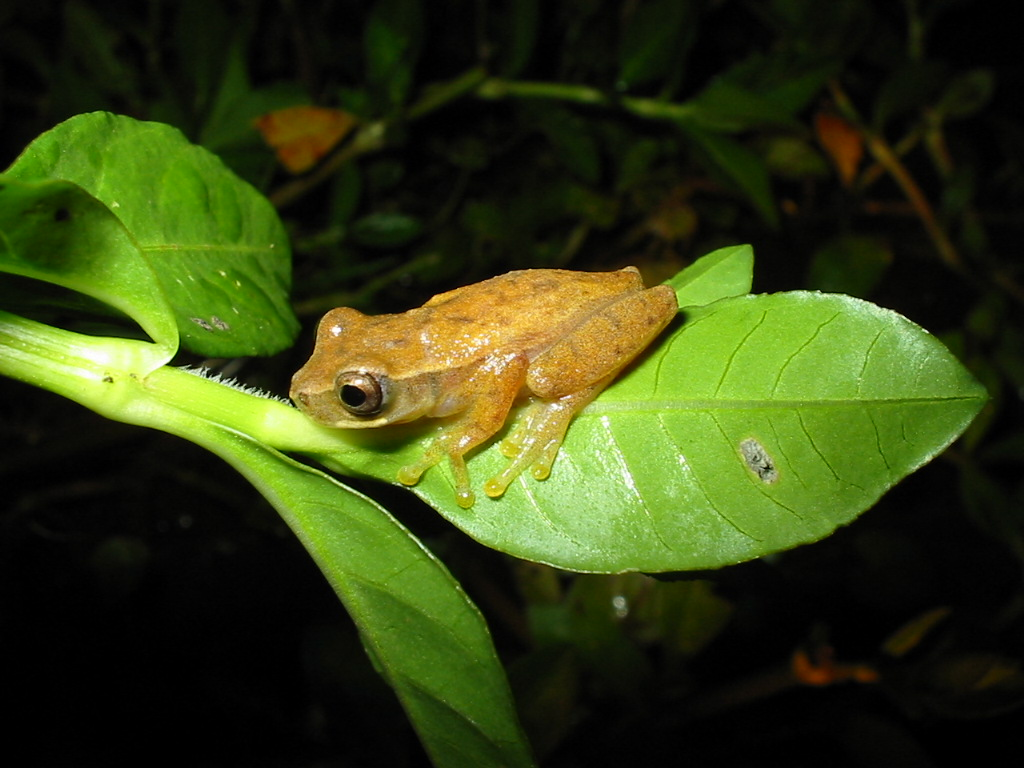

Conservation status
- Least Concern (IUCN 3.1)

Scientific classification
- Kingdom: Animalia
- Phylum: Chordata
- Class: Amphibia
- Order: Anura
- Family: Hylidae
- Genus: Dendropsophus
- Species: D. branneri

Binomial name
- Dendropsophus branneri (Cochran, 1948)

Synonyms
- Hyla bipunctata branneri Cochran, 1948; Hyla branneri — Bokermann, 1966; Hyla scrobiculata B. Lutz, 1973

= Dendropsophus branneri =

Species of frog from Brazil

Dendropsophus branneri is a small hylid tree frog endemic to the Atlantic Forest region of Brazil. It feeds mainly on arthropods and is preyed upon by various invertebrates (e.g., giant aquatic bugs, spiders) and vertebrates (e.g., snakes, birds). Although currently classified by the IUCN Redlist as "least concern", D. branneri suffers rapid habitat loss due to residential development, agriculture, logging, and clearing for pastureland. Male D. branneri are noted for their fighting call, which differs significantly in frequency, duration, and pulses per call compared to their mate advertisement call. Males are also noted for their willingness to escalate physical altercations against other males, which includes kicking, pushing, and wrestling their opponent into non-dominant positions. Unlike most other frog species, D. branneri can breed in both temporary and permanent pools allowing it to inhabit a wide variety of habitats leading to its wide distribution.

== Description ==
=== Adult ===
D. branneri females are about 21.5mm in snout-vent length (SVL), and males are about 18mm. Their snout is short and rounded from above. Both sexes have vomerine teeth located in two small patches between the choanae. The skin of the throat and chest is smooth and females and slightly placated in males due to their larger vocal sacs. The skin of the belly is coarsely granular. Their dorsal color ranges from a pinkish vinaceous to a fawnish color. They have a light-brown crossbar between their eyes and a black mark on their back that extends to the sacral region.

Both sexes exhibit a silvery white spot under each eye, which differentiates D. branneri from a host of closely related and morphologically similar Dendrosophopus species. However, an infrequent polymorphism exists in which D. branneri individuals exhibit either no spots or a spot only under one eye.

=== Tadpole ===
The tadpole bodies of D. branneri are violin-shaped (elongated in top-down dorsal view, depressed in lateral view). Their body height is approximately ~50% of the body length, and body length is approximately ~25% of the total length (including tail). Nostrils are small elliptical structures located near the oral disc and are visible from both a lateral and dorsal view. Eyes are laterally oriented at a distance of ~55% of the body width. The eye diameter is ~25% of the body width.

== Habitat and distribution ==
The Dendropsophus branneri are endemic to mountainous regions of the Brazilian Atlantic Forest, between Maranhão and Rio de Janeiro.

They are typically found between the Rio Paraiba valley and High Muriaé River regions. They typically inhabit savannas, shrublands, grasslands, Restinga forests, and high-altitude swamps. Their long reproductive periods and strong adaptation abilities allow them to inhabit diverse ecosystems. D. branneri also live in vegetation surrounding temporary and permanent freshwater ponds. They have adapted to suit warm, dry climates to expand their ranges. Small ranges remain a threat to survival and can increase concern level on the IUCN Red List.

== Conservation ==
=== Habitat loss ===
The Atlantic Forest region is known for its richness in biodiversity, with over 400 species known and additional species being continually documented. A 2013 study estimated that anurans represent 6.5% of approximately 459 species in the Atlantic Forest biome. The Atlantic Forest is at only 7% of its original size due to habitat destruction from residential development, agriculture, logging, and clearing of pasture lands. D. branneri inhabits areas under "high anthropogenic impact": for example urban areas nearby gardens and residential neighborhoods. With such extreme habitat loss, D. branneri have begun to inhabit human-altered regions. Field surveys surprisingly found high density of many different frog species in the High Muriaé region, despite its comparatively high degradation by humans.

In the mid 1800's, Atlantic Forest regions inhabited by D. branneri underwent cacao cultivation by the "cabruca" agricultural strategy, in which trees are planted within thinned-out native forest or introduced trees such as jackfruit, yellow mombin, and mountain immortelle. Cabruca-cultivated regions now stretch through regions 70% the size of Atlantic Forest remnants in southern Bahia, Brazil. Appraisals of these cultivated areas suggest that these regions are still inhabitable for frogs and other local fauna, but is not as strong a habitat as unaltered forest.

== Phylogeny and relatives ==
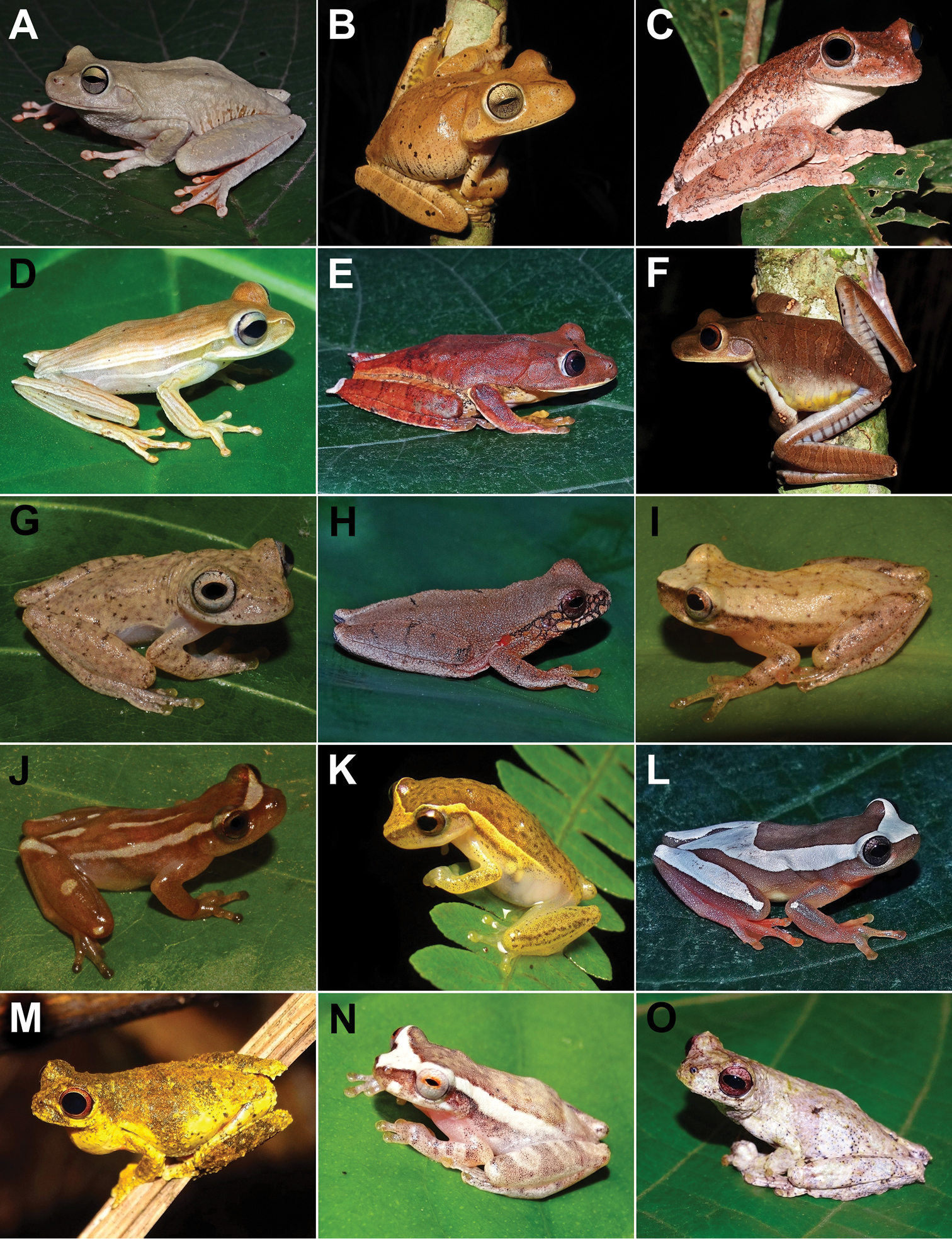
Amphibians from Santa Teresa, Rio de Janeiro, Brazil. Specimen I. is Dendropsophus branneri. Specimens J-O are other species under genus Dendropsophus.

Genus Dendropsophus contains over 100 species of small frogs that inhabits Central and South America. D. branneri was previously classified under genus Hyla, but has been re-classified to genus Dendropsophus. D. branneri is morphologically similar to close relatives D. minusculus and D. oliveira but can be distinguished by unique white blotches underneath their eyes and distinctive advertisement calls.

== Diet ==
D. branneri utilize a "sit and wait" strategy in which they wait for food to enter proximity by chance, rather than actively foraging. A study of D. branneri living on coca plantations in southern Bahia, Brazil suggests a diet consisting largely of arthropods. Analysis of their stomach contents revealed three main prey orders: Diptera (14.96%), Araneae (11.02%), and larval lepidoptera (11.02%). Other prey found in the stomach contents include: blattaria, hemiptera, acari, hymenoptera, orthoptera. An average of 1.5 items were found per frog stomach. There was no significant correlation between frog body mass or snout-vent length and ingested volume of prey.

Stomach content analysis of D. branneri exhibited significant plant content (13.39% of total volume). It is unclear whether this ingestion is intentional or an accidental consequence of arthropod hunting. D. branneri are the first species in which stomach flushing was used as a mechanism for studying the diet of frogs smaller than 14.4mm snout vent length (SVL).

Whereas, the stomach content analysis of its closely related species, D. minutus, sampled in Serra Norte, Carajás, Brazil presented a slightly different prey composition. In D. minutus, Araneae was found to be the dominant prey-type. Larger frog species P. rohdei and P. burmeisteri tend to prey on larger invertebrates compared to D. branneri, likely related to a larger mouth size.

== Mating ==
=== Breeding season ===
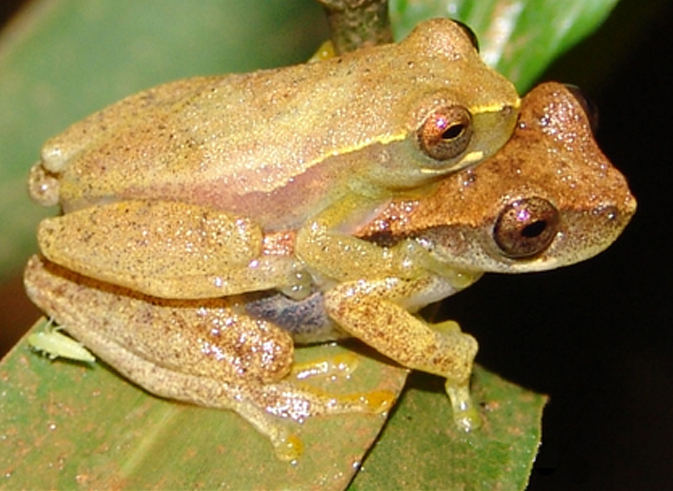
Dendropsophus branneri in amplexus

The D. branneri breeding season lasts from May to September, with the highest reproductive activity concentrated during the rainy season. During the breeding season, D. branneri aggregate and lay eggs on the water surface. D. branneri are known to have a uniquely long breeding season compared to other frogs. Unlike most frog species that can only utilize temporary ponds for breeding, D. branneri is able to breed in both temporary and permanent pools. This allows D. branneri to inhabit a comparatively wide variety of habitats including savanna, shrubland, lowland grassland, freshwater marshes, and human-impacted areas such as pastureland.

=== Male/male interactions ===
D. branneri males are more willing to escalate aggressive behavior compared to other frog species, who prefer to avoid combat and associated injury risk. Preliminary confrontational behaviors typically include chasing and calls of aggression. These behaviors can then escalate into more aggressive behaviors such as kicking, pushing, and other physical attacks, for example use of anterior limbs to force the opponent into a non-dominant position. Fights are normally avoided as it can be costly due to injuries. Analysis of vocalizations has demonstrated distinct differences between fighting calls and advertisement calls. Compared to advertisement calls, fighting calls exhibit lower dominant frequency (4866.50 vs. 6350 Hz), longer duration (0.2492 vs. 0.03 seconds), and higher number of pulses per call (62.3 vs. 4). The reasons for fighting calls have not been identified as calls may be costly because of extra energy consumption and predator attraction.

== Enemies ==
=== Predators ===
Because D. branneri inhabit and breed at the fringes of ponds, they are highly accessible to both aquatic and terrestrial predators. D. branneri are particularly vulnerable to predation during their metamorphic stages as they are transitioning from water to land.

Dendropsophus species are generally smaller or similar in size to their predators. The vertebrate predators of D.branneri include snakes, birds, and other frogs. Whereas, the invertebrate predators include giant aquatic bugs and spiders. The most documented instances of spider predation of Dendropsophus frogs reside in the southern Atlantic Forest. Spiders can serve as either predators or prey to D. branneri, depending on the size of the frog. Most arachnid predators of Dendropsophus species belong to the family Ctenidae, but also include: Araneidae, Lycosidae, Nephilidae, Pisauridae, and Trechaleida. A field predation event of a theraphosid spider (84.12mm) on a juvenile of D. branneri's close relative Dendropsophus marinus (90.52mm) exhibited bite hemorrhages in the prey's gular region. Two hours after the ambush, the prey was still alive but paralyzed in one eye and hind limb. Small frogs are likely a vital component of Ctenidae diets during the rainy season, when there are many temporary ponds accessible to spiders.

=== Parasites ===
Anurans play a central role in the parasitic worm (helminth) life cycle because they both consume and are preyed upon by a large variety of animals, which allows for widespread transmission of helminth across host species. A 2017 study investigated the presence of helminth in various tree frog species in the Brazilian Atlantic Forest, and they found five different genera of helminth in a sample of 33 D. branneri specimens. Encysted larvae of parasitic roundworm genera Brevimulticaecum and Porrocaecum were observed in D. branneri gastrointestinal tissues.

== Vocalizations ==
Amphibian vocalization characteristics are defined by both frog physiology (e.g., mass, SVL) and environmental factors (e.g., humidity, temperature). Multiple studies offer slightly different values for the basic vocalization metrics of D. branneri. An older study by Nunes et al. documents average values of: 4 pulses per call, 0.03 second call duration, 6.35 kHz dominant call frequency, and 0.37 second interval between calls. A more recent study by De Oliveira-Santos et al. documents average values of: 11 pulses per call, 0.73 second call duration, 6.7 kHz dominant call frequency, and 93 calls per minute.

Analysis of call characteristics as a function of body metrics surprisingly demonstrated no relationship between SVL and dominant frequency. Large body mass was associated with decreased number of pulses per note and body mass, large SVL was associated with increased interval duration between calls.

There is greater variation in advertisement calls across males than within a single male. The metric of call repetition rate has particularly high variation between D. branneri males and could potentially play a role in individual recognition.
