= Thoriosa spinivulva =

Scientific classification
- Domain: Eukaryota
- Kingdom: Animalia
- Phylum: Arthropoda
- Subphylum: Chelicerata
- Class: Arachnida
- Order: Araneae
- Infraorder: Araneomorphae
- Family: Ctenidae
- Genus: Thoriosa
- Species: T. spinivulva

Binomial name
- Thoriosa spinivulva Simon, 1910

Species of spider

Thoriosa spinivulva is a spider species of the family Ctenidae that is endemic on São Tomé Island. It was first named in 1910 by Eugène Simon.

Its male holotype measures from 11 to 12 mm and its female holotype measures from 8 to 10 mm.
