= Thoriosa fulvastra =

Scientific classification
- Domain: Eukaryota
- Kingdom: Animalia
- Phylum: Arthropoda
- Subphylum: Chelicerata
- Class: Arachnida
- Order: Araneae
- Infraorder: Araneomorphae
- Family: Ctenidae
- Genus: Thoriosa
- Species: T. fulvastra

Binomial name
- Thoriosa fulvastra Simon, 1910

Species of spider

Thoriosa fulvastra is a spider species of the wandering spider family (Ctenidae) native to Sierra Leone and São Tomé and Príncipe. It was first named in 1910 by Eugène Simon.

Its female holotype measures from 11 to 12 mm and is believed to be reposited in the National Museum of Natural History in Paris, France.
