= Ciba (spider) =

Scientific classification
- Domain: Eukaryota
- Kingdom: Animalia
- Phylum: Arthropoda
- Subphylum: Chelicerata
- Class: Arachnida
- Order: Araneae
- Infraorder: Araneomorphae
- Family: Ctenidae
- Genus: Ciba; Bloom, Binford, Esposito, Alayón, Peterson, Nishida, Loubet-Senear & Agnarsson, 2014

Type species
- C. calzada (Alayón, 1985)

Species
- C. calzada (Alayón, 1985) — Cuba; C. seibo Alayón & Agnarsson, 2014 — Dominican Republic

Genus of spiders

Ciba is a genus of Caribbean wandering spiders first described in 2014. As of April 2019 it contains only two species. It is one of two species of eyeless spiders found in a Hispaniola cave. The non-expression of eyes and eye pigment in Ciba spiders is an energy-saving adaption in response to their dark cave habitat.
