= Mahafalytenus =

Scientific classification
- Domain: Eukaryota
- Kingdom: Animalia
- Phylum: Arthropoda
- Subphylum: Chelicerata
- Class: Arachnida
- Order: Araneae
- Infraorder: Araneomorphae
- Family: Ctenidae
- Genus: Mahafalytenus; Silva-Dávila, 2007

Type species
- M. tsilo Silva-Dávila, 2007

Species
- 7, see text

Genus of spiders

Mahafalytenus is a genus of East African wandering spiders first described by D. Silva-Dávila in 2007.

== Species ==
As of April 2019 it contains seven species, all found in Madagascar:

- Mahafalytenus fo Silva-Dávila, 2007 – Madagascar
- Mahafalytenus fohy Silva-Dávila, 2007 – Madagascar
- Mahafalytenus hafa Silva-Dávila, 2007 – Madagascar
- Mahafalytenus isalo Silva-Dávila, 2007 – Madagascar
- Mahafalytenus osy Silva-Dávila, 2007 – Madagascar
- Mahafalytenus paosy Silva-Dávila, 2007 – Madagascar
- Mahafalytenus tsilo Silva-Dávila, 2007 (type) – Madagascar
