= Wiedenmeyeria =

Scientific classification
- Domain: Eukaryota
- Kingdom: Animalia
- Phylum: Arthropoda
- Subphylum: Chelicerata
- Class: Arachnida
- Order: Araneae
- Infraorder: Araneomorphae
- Family: Ctenidae
- Genus: Wiedenmeyeria; Schenkel, 1953
- Species: W. falconensis

Binomial name
- Wiedenmeyeria falconensis Schenkel, 1953

Genus of spiders

Wiedenmeyeria is a monotypic genus of South American wandering spiders containing the single species, Wiedenmeyeria falconensis. It was first described by E. Schenkel in 1953, and has only been found in Venezuela.
