= Celaetycheus =

Scientific classification
- Kingdom: Animalia
- Phylum: Arthropoda
- Subphylum: Chelicerata
- Class: Arachnida
- Order: Araneae
- Infraorder: Araneomorphae
- Family: Ctenidae
- Genus: Celaetycheus; Simon, 1897

Type species
- C. flavostriatus Simon, 1897

Species
- 10, see text

Genus of spiders

Celaetycheus is a genus of South American wandering spiders first described by Eugène Simon in 1897.

== Species ==
As of April 2019 it contains ten species, all found in Brazil:

- Celaetycheus abara Polotow & Brescovit, 2013 – Brazil
- Celaetycheus aberem Polotow & Brescovit, 2013 – Brazil
- Celaetycheus acaraje Polotow & Brescovit, 2013 – Brazil
- Celaetycheus beiju Polotow & Brescovit, 2013 – Brazil
- Celaetycheus bobo Polotow & Brescovit, 2013 – Brazil
- Celaetycheus caruru Polotow & Brescovit, 2013 – Brazil
- Celaetycheus flavostriatus Simon, 1897 (type) – Brazil
- Celaetycheus moqueca Polotow & Brescovit, 2013 – Brazil
- Celaetycheus mungunza Polotow & Brescovit, 2013 – Brazil
- Celaetycheus vatapa Polotow & Brescovit, 2013 – Brazil
