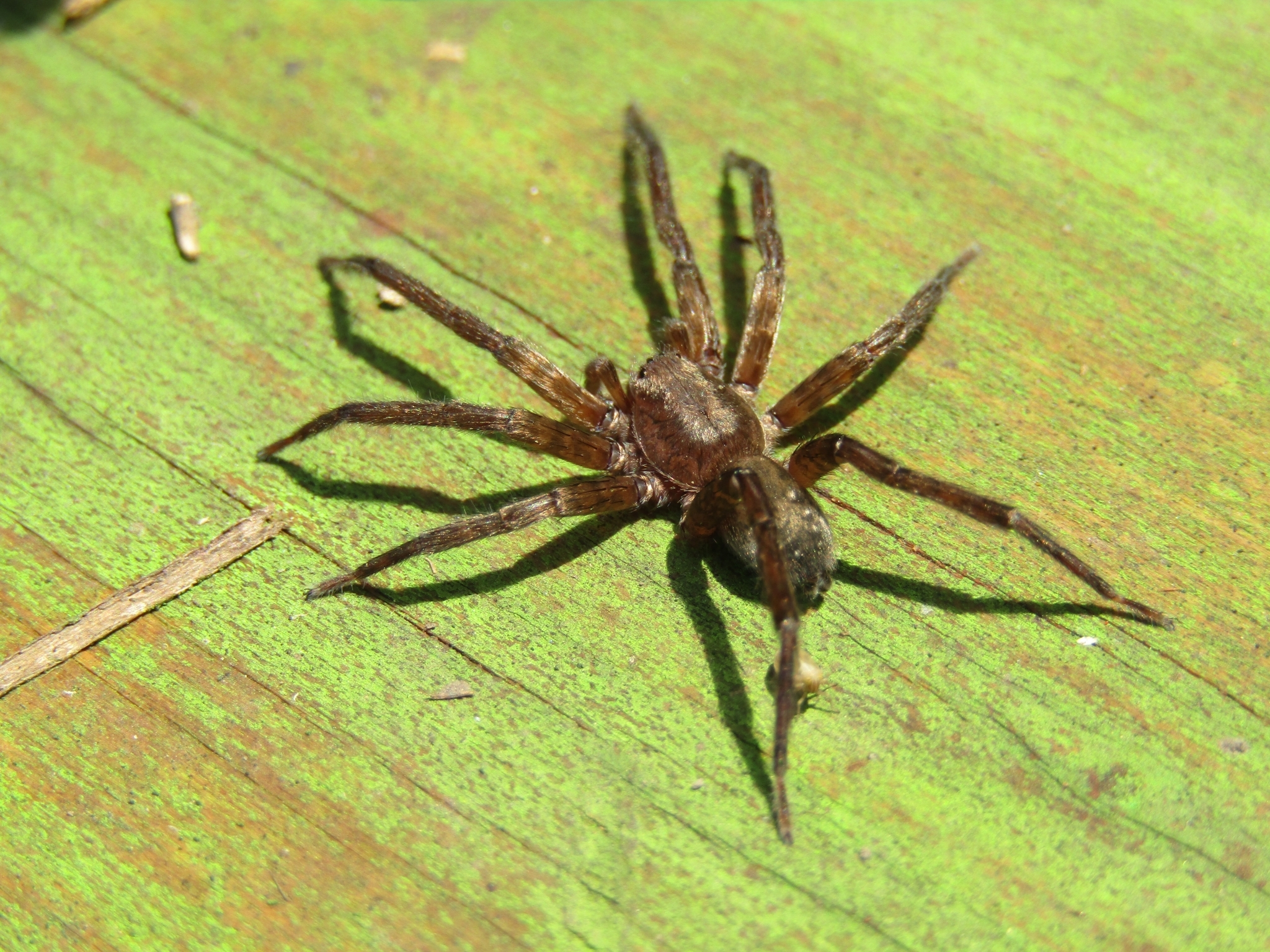

Scientific classification
- Kingdom: Animalia
- Phylum: Arthropoda
- Subphylum: Chelicerata
- Class: Arachnida
- Order: Araneae
- Infraorder: Araneomorphae
- Family: Ctenidae
- Genus: Asthenoctenus; Simon, 1897

Type species
- A. borellii Simon, 1897

Species
- 6, see text

= Asthenoctenus =

Genus of spiders

Asthenoctenus is a genus of South American wandering spiders first described by Eugène Simon in 1897.

== Species ==
As of April 2019 it contains six species:

- Asthenoctenus borellii Simon, 1897 (type) – Brazil, Uruguay, Paraguay, Argentina
- Asthenoctenus bulimus (Strand, 1909) – Brazil
- Asthenoctenus hingstoni (Mello-Leitão, 1948) – Guyana
- Asthenoctenus longistylus Brescovit & Simó, 1998 – Brazil
- Asthenoctenus tarsalis (F. O. Pickard-Cambridge, 1902) – Brazil
- Asthenoctenus tigrinus Mello-Leitão, 1938 – Argentina
