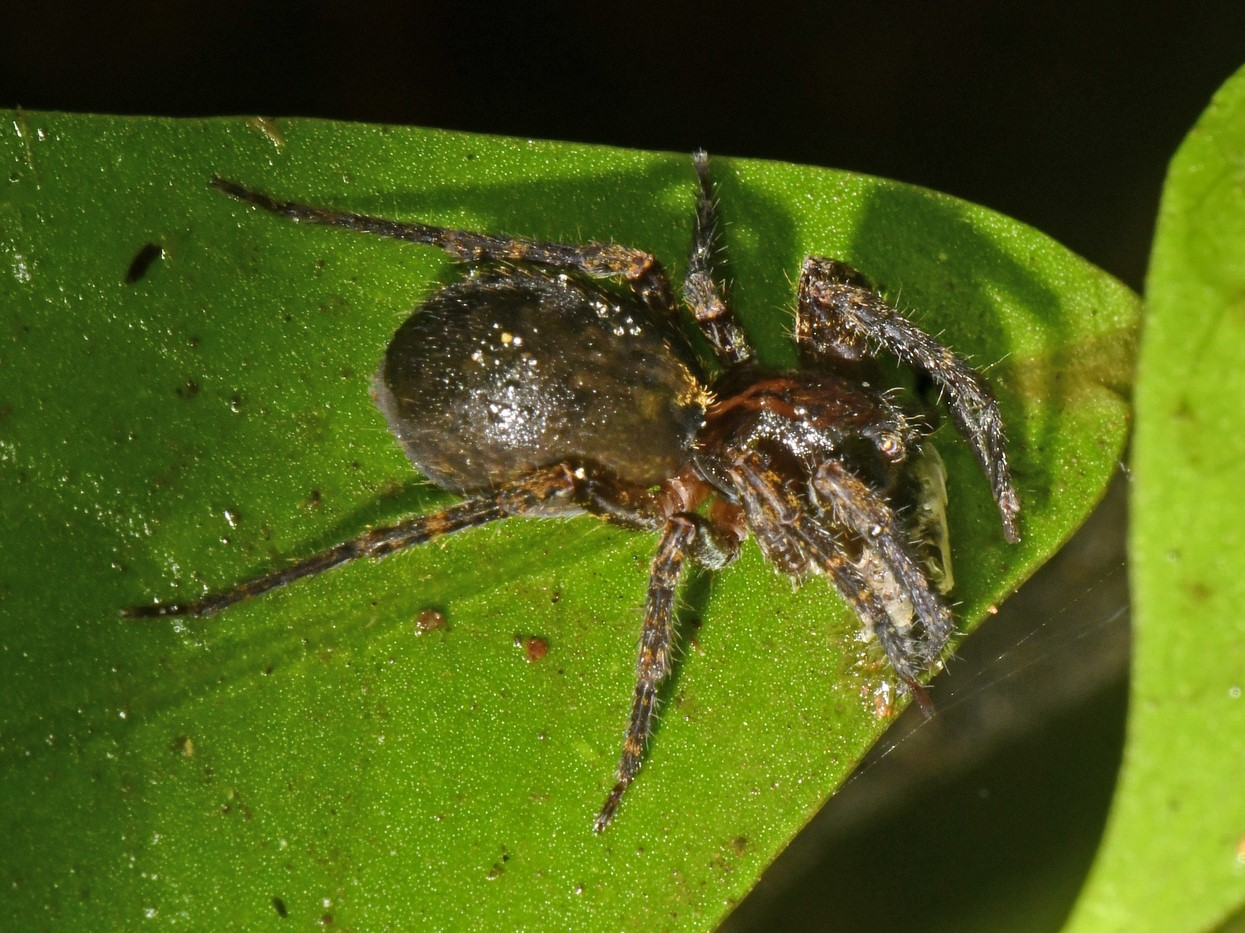

Scientific classification
- Kingdom: Animalia
- Phylum: Arthropoda
- Subphylum: Chelicerata
- Class: Arachnida
- Order: Araneae
- Infraorder: Araneomorphae
- Family: Ctenidae
- Genus: Spinoctenus; Hazzi, Polotow, Brescovit, González-Obando & Simó, 2018

Type species
- S. yotoco Hazzi, Polotow, Brescovit, González-Obando & Simó, 2018

Species
- 11, see text

= Spinoctenus =

Genus of spiders

Spinoctenus is a genus of wandering spiders first described by N. A. Hazzi, D. Polotow, Antônio Domingos Brescovit, R. González-Obando & M. Simó in 2018.

== Species ==
As of April 2019 it contains eleven species:

- Spinoctenus chocoensis Hazzi, Polotow, Brescovit, González-Obando & Simó, 2018 — Colombia
- Spinoctenus eberhardi Hazzi, Polotow, Brescovit, González-Obando & Simó, 2018 — Colombia
- Spinoctenus escalerete Hazzi, Polotow, Brescovit, González-Obando & Simó, 2018 — Colombia
- Spinoctenus flammigerus Hazzi, Polotow, Brescovit, González-Obando & Simó, 2018 — Colombia
- Spinoctenus florezi Hazzi, Polotow, Brescovit, González-Obando & Simó, 2018 — Colombia
- Spinoctenus nambi Hazzi, Polotow, Brescovit, González-Obando & Simó, 2018 — Colombia
- Spinoctenus pericos Hazzi, Polotow, Brescovit, González-Obando & Simó, 2018 — Colombia
- Spinoctenus spinosus Hazzi, Polotow, Brescovit, González-Obando & Simó, 2018 — Colombia
- Spinoctenus stephaniae Hazzi, Polotow, Brescovit, González-Obando & Simó, 2018 — Colombia
- Spinoctenus tequendama Hazzi, Polotow, Brescovit, González-Obando & Simó, 2018 — Colombia
- Spinoctenus yotoco Hazzi, Polotow, Brescovit, González-Obando & Simó, 2018 — Colombia
