= Gephyroctenus =

Scientific classification
- Domain: Eukaryota
- Kingdom: Animalia
- Phylum: Arthropoda
- Subphylum: Chelicerata
- Class: Arachnida
- Order: Araneae
- Infraorder: Araneomorphae
- Family: Ctenidae
- Genus: Gephyroctenus; Mello-Leitão, 1936

Type species
- G. philodromoides Mello-Leitão, 1936

Species
- 9, see text

Genus of spiders

Gephyroctenus is a genus of South American wandering spiders first described by Cândido Firmino de Mello-Leitão in 1936.

== Species ==
As of April 2019 it contains nine species:

- Gephyroctenus acre Polotow & Brescovit, 2008 – Brazil
- Gephyroctenus atininga Polotow & Brescovit, 2008 – Brazil
- Gephyroctenus divisor Polotow & Brescovit, 2008 – Brazil
- Gephyroctenus esteio Polotow & Brescovit, 2008 – Brazil
- Gephyroctenus juruti Polotow & Brescovit, 2008 – Peru, Brazil
- Gephyroctenus mapia Polotow & Brescovit, 2008 – Brazil
- Gephyroctenus panguana Polotow & Brescovit, 2008 – Peru
- Gephyroctenus philodromoides Mello-Leitão, 1936 (type) – Peru, Brazil
- Gephyroctenus portovelho Polotow & Brescovit, 2008 – Brazil
