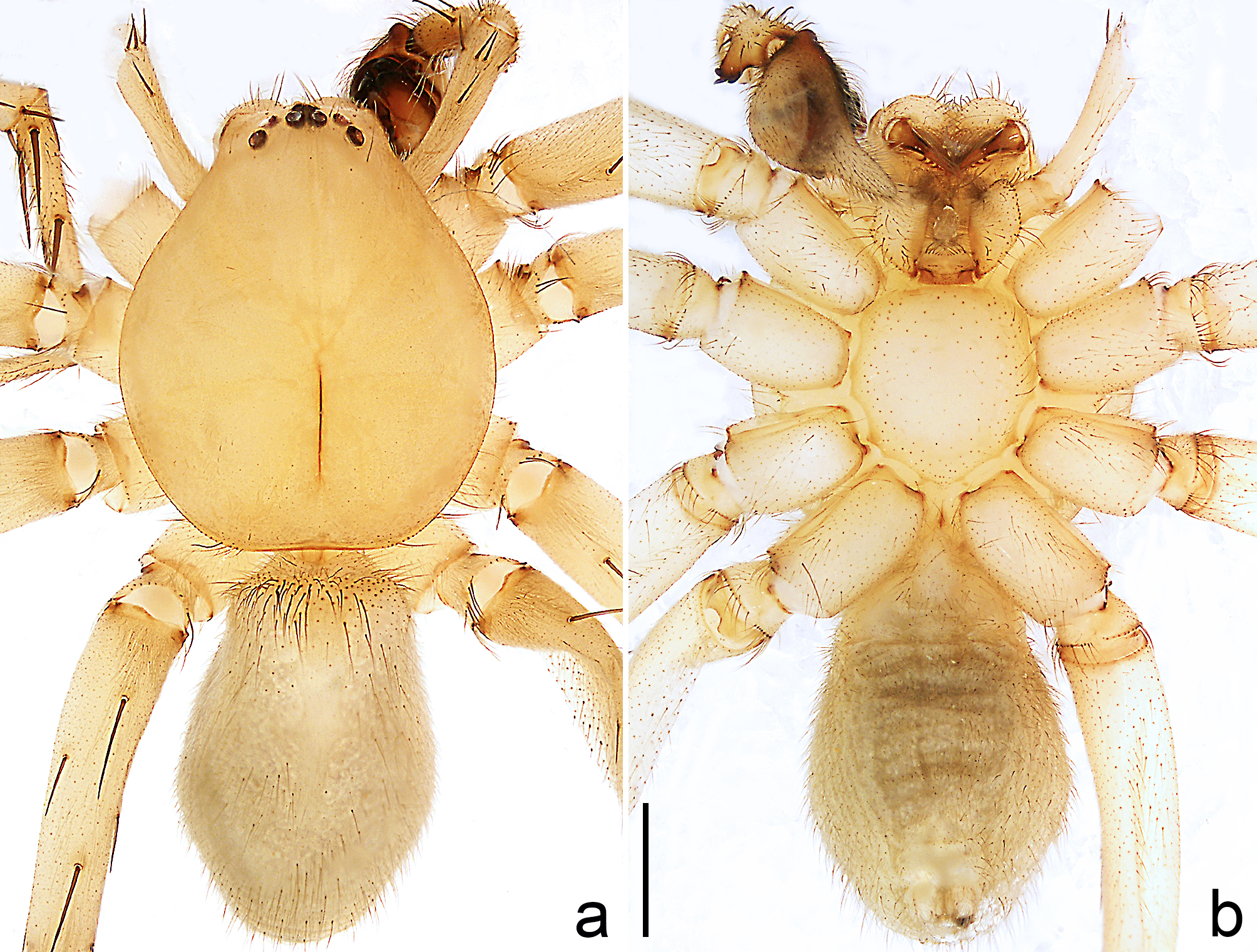

Scientific classification
- Kingdom: Animalia
- Phylum: Arthropoda
- Subphylum: Chelicerata
- Class: Arachnida
- Order: Araneae
- Infraorder: Araneomorphae
- Family: Ctenidae
- Genus: Amauropelma; Raven, Stumkat & Gray, 2001

Type species
- A. trueloves Raven & Stumkat, 2001

Species
- 32, see text

= Amauropelma =

Genus of spiders

Amauropelma is a genus of Australian and Asian wandering spiders first described by Robert Raven, Kylie S. Stumkat & Michael R. Gray in 2001.

== Species ==
As of January 2025 it contains thirty-two species:

- Amauropelma annegretae Jäger, 2012 – Laos
- Amauropelma anzses Raven & Stumkat, 2001 – Australia (Queensland)
- Amauropelma beyersdorfi Jäger, 2012 – India
- Amauropelma bluewater Raven & Stumkat, 2001 – Australia (Queensland)
- Amauropelma claudie Raven & Stumkat, 2001 – Australia (Queensland)
- Amauropelma ekeftys Jäger, 2012 – India
- Amauropelma gayundah Raven & Stumkat, 2001 – Australia (Queensland)
- Amauropelma gordon Raven & Stumkat, 2001 – Australia (Queensland)
- Amauropelma guangxi Lin & Li, 2022 – China
- Amauropelma hasenpuschi Raven & Stumkat, 2001 – Australia (Queensland)
- Amauropelma hoffmanni Jäger, 2012 – Laos
- Amauropelma jagelkii Jäger, 2012 – Laos
- Amauropelma khanense Jäger & Nophaseud, 2024 – Laos
- Amauropelma krabi Li & Yao, 2022 – Thailand
- Amauropelma leo Raven & Stumkat, 2001 – Australia (Queensland)
- Amauropelma mariae Omelko & Fomichev, 2024 – Indonesia (Sumatra
- Amauropelma matakecil Miller & Rahmadi, 2012 – Indonesia (Java)
- Amauropelma mcilwraith Raven & Stumkat, 2001 – Australia (Queensland)
- Amauropelma medogensis Wang, Irfan, Zhang & Zhang, 2024 – China
- Amauropelma monteithi Raven & Stumkat, 2001 – Australia (Queensland)
- Amauropelma mossman Raven & Stumkat, 2001 – Australia (Queensland)
- Amauropelma phangnga Li & Yao, 2022 – Thailand
- Amauropelma pineck Raven & Stumkat, 2001 – Australia (Queensland)
- Amauropelma rifleck Raven & Stumkat, 2001 – Australia (Queensland)
- Amauropelma saraburi Li & Yao, 2022 – Thailand
- Amauropelma staschi Jäger, 2012 – India
- Amauropelma thamcon Jäger & Nophaseud, 2024 – Laos
- Amauropelma torbjorni Raven & Gray, 2001 – Australia (Queensland)
- Amauropelma trueloves Raven & Stumkat, 2001 (type) – Australia (Queensland)
- Amauropelma undara Raven & Gray, 2001 – Australia (Queensland)
- Amauropelma wallaman Raven & Stumkat, 2001 – Australia (Queensland)
- Amauropelma yunnan Yao & Li, 2022 – China

(For Amauropelma fungiferum (Thorell, 1890) – Malaysia, see Bowie fungifer(Thorell, 1890). [Note: The recombination was published as Amauropelma fungifer with species epithet altered to neuter for gender agreement by mandatory correction]).
