= Afroneutria =

Scientific classification
- Kingdom: Animalia
- Phylum: Arthropoda
- Subphylum: Chelicerata
- Class: Arachnida
- Order: Araneae
- Infraorder: Araneomorphae
- Family: Ctenidae
- Genus: Afroneutria; Jocqué

Type species
- Afroneutria velox

Species
- 6, see text

Genus of spiders

Afroneutria is a genus of spiders in the family Ctenidae. It was first described in 2015 by Polotow & Jocqué. As of 2017, it contains 6 species, all African.

== Species ==
Afroneutria comprises the following species:

- Afroneutria erythrochelis (Simon, 1876)
- Afroneutria hybrida Polotow & Jocqué, 2015
- Afroneutria immortalis (Arts, 1912)
- Afroneutria quadrimaculata Polotow & Jocqué, 2015
- Afroneutria tanga Polotow & Jocqué, 2016
- Afroneutria velox (Blackwall, 1865)
