= Macroctenus =

Scientific classification
- Kingdom: Animalia
- Phylum: Arthropoda
- Subphylum: Chelicerata
- Class: Arachnida
- Order: Araneae
- Infraorder: Araneomorphae
- Family: Ctenidae
- Genus: Macroctenus; Henrard & Jocqué, 2017

Type species
- M. kingsleyi (F. O. Pickard-Cambridge, 1898)

Species
- 5, see text

Genus of spiders

Macroctenus is a genus of wandering spiders first described by A. Henrard & Rudy Jocqué in 2017.

== Species ==
As of April 2019 it contains five species:

- Macroctenus herbicola Henrard & Jocqué, 2017 — Guinea
- Macroctenus kingsleyi (F. O. Pickard-Cambridge, 1898) — West, Central Africa
- Macroctenus nimba Henrard & Jocqué, 2017 — Guinea
- Macroctenus occidentalis (F. O. Pickard-Cambridge, 1898) — West Africa
- Macroctenus vandenspiegeli Henrard & Jocqué, 2017 — Guinea
