= Bulboctenus =

Scientific classification
- Kingdom: Animalia
- Phylum: Arthropoda
- Subphylum: Chelicerata
- Class: Arachnida
- Order: Araneae
- Infraorder: Araneomorphae
- Family: Ctenidae
- Genus: Bulboctenus; Pereira, Labarque & Polotow, 2020

Type species
- B. kayapo Pereira, Labarque & Polotow, 2020

Species
- Bulboctenus itunaitata Pereira, Labarque & Polotow, 2020; Bulboctenus kayapo Pereira, Labarque & Polotow, 2020; Bulboctenus munduruku Pereira, Labarque & Polotow, 2020

Genus of spiders

Bulboctenus is a genus of South American wandering spiders. It was first described by M. P. Pereira, F. M. Labarque and D. Polotow in 2020, and it has only been found in Brazil. As of November 2021 it contains only three species: B. itunaitata, B. kayapo, and B. munduruku.
