= Arctenus =

Scientific classification
- Kingdom: Animalia
- Phylum: Arthropoda
- Subphylum: Chelicerata
- Class: Arachnida
- Order: Araneae
- Infraorder: Araneomorphae
- Family: Ctenidae
- Genus: Arctenus; Polotow & Jocqué, 2014
- Species: A. taitensis

Binomial name
- Arctenus taitensis Polotow & Jocqué, 2014

Genus of spiders

Arctenus is a monotypic genus of spiders in the family Ctenidae. It was first described by Polotow & Jocqué in 2014. As of 2023, it contains only one species, Arctenus taitensis, from Kenya.
