= Apolania =

Conservation status
- Critically Endangered (IUCN 3.1)

Scientific classification
- Kingdom: Animalia
- Phylum: Arthropoda
- Subphylum: Chelicerata
- Class: Arachnida
- Order: Araneae
- Infraorder: Araneomorphae
- Family: Ctenidae
- Genus: Apolania; Simon, 1898
- Species: A. segmentata

Binomial name
- Apolania segmentata Simon, 1898

Genus of spiders

Apolania is a monotypic genus of East African wandering spiders containing the single species, Apolania segmentata, first described from a male found by Eugène Simon in 1898. No females have been described yet, and it has only been found in Seychelles.
