= Phymatoctenus =

Scientific classification
- Kingdom: Animalia
- Phylum: Arthropoda
- Subphylum: Chelicerata
- Class: Arachnida
- Order: Araneae
- Infraorder: Araneomorphae
- Family: Ctenidae
- Genus: Phymatoctenus; Simon, 1897

Type species
- P. comosus Simon, 1897

Species
- P. comosus Simon, 1897 – Brazil, Guyana; P. sassii Reimoser, 1939 – Costa Rica; P. tristani Reimoser, 1939 – Costa Rica

Genus of spiders

Phymatoctenus is a genus of South American and Caribbean wandering spiders first described by Eugène Simon in 1897. As of April 2019 it contains only three species in Brazil, Cuba, and Costa Rica: P. comosus, P. sassii, and P. tristani.
