= Perictenus =

Scientific classification
- Kingdom: Animalia
- Phylum: Arthropoda
- Subphylum: Chelicerata
- Class: Arachnida
- Order: Araneae
- Infraorder: Araneomorphae
- Family: Ctenidae
- Genus: Perictenus; Henrard & Jocqué, 2017
- Species: P. molecula

Binomial name
- Perictenus molecula Henrard & Jocqué, 2017

Genus of spiders

Perictenus is a genus of wandering spiders containing the single species, Perictenus molecula. It was first described by A. Henrard & Rudy Jocqué in 2017, and is only found in Guinea.
