= Montescueia =

Scientific classification
- Domain: Eukaryota
- Kingdom: Animalia
- Phylum: Arthropoda
- Subphylum: Chelicerata
- Class: Arachnida
- Order: Araneae
- Infraorder: Araneomorphae
- Family: Ctenidae
- Genus: Montescueia; Carcavallo & Martínez, 1961
- Species: M. leitaoi

Binomial name
- Montescueia leitaoi Carcavallo & Martínez, 1961

Genus of spiders

Montescueia is a monotypic genus of South American wandering spiders containing the single species, Montescueia leitaoi. The male was described by R. U. Carcavallo & A. Martínez in 1961, but no female has been described yet. It has only been found in Argentina.
