= Nothroctenus =

Scientific classification
- Domain: Eukaryota
- Kingdom: Animalia
- Phylum: Arthropoda
- Subphylum: Chelicerata
- Class: Arachnida
- Order: Araneae
- Infraorder: Araneomorphae
- Family: Ctenidae
- Genus: Nothroctenus; Badcock, 1932

Type species
- N. stupidus Badcock, 1932

Species
- 9, see text

Synonyms
- Leitanoctenus Soares & Camargo, 1948

Genus of spiders

Nothroctenus is a genus of South American wandering spiders first described by H. D. Badcock in 1932.

== Species ==
As of April 2019 it contains nine species in Brazil, Paraguay, and Bolivia:

- Nothroctenus bahiensis Mello-Leitão, 1936 – Brazil
- Nothroctenus fuxico Dias & Brescovit, 2004 – Brazil
- Nothroctenus lineatus (Tullgren, 1905) – Bolivia
- Nothroctenus marshi (F. O. Pickard-Cambridge, 1897) – Brazil, Paraguay, Bolivia
  - Nothroctenus m. pygmaeus (Strand, 1909) – Brazil
- Nothroctenus omega (Mello-Leitão, 1929) – Brazil
- Nothroctenus sericeus (Mello-Leitão, 1929) – Brazil
- Nothroctenus spinulosus (Mello-Leitão, 1929) – Brazil
- Nothroctenus stupidus Badcock, 1932 (type) – Paraguay
