= Trujillina =

Scientific classification
- Domain: Eukaryota
- Kingdom: Animalia
- Phylum: Arthropoda
- Subphylum: Chelicerata
- Class: Arachnida
- Order: Araneae
- Infraorder: Araneomorphae
- Family: Ctenidae
- Genus: Trujillina; Bryant, 1948

Type species
- T. spinipes Bryant, 1948

Species
- T. hursti (Bryant, 1948) – Hispaniola; T. isolata (Bryant, 1942) – Puerto Rico; T. spinipes Bryant, 1948 – Hispaniola

Genus of spiders

Trujillina is a genus of Caribbean wandering spiders first described by E. B. Bryant in 1948. As of April 2019 it contains only three species on Hispaniola and in Puerto Rico: T. hursti, T. isolata, and T. spinipes.
