= Sinoctenus =

Scientific classification
- Kingdom: Animalia
- Phylum: Arthropoda
- Subphylum: Chelicerata
- Class: Arachnida
- Order: Araneae
- Infraorder: Araneomorphae
- Family: Ctenidae
- Genus: Sinoctenus; Marusik, Zhang & Omelko, 2012
- Species: S. zhui

Binomial name
- Sinoctenus zhui Marusik, Zhang & Omelko, 2012

Genus of spiders

Sinoctenus is a monotypic genus of East Asian wandering spiders containing the single species, Sinoctenus zhui. A male was first described by Yuri M. Marusik, F. Zhang & M. M. Omelko in 2012, but no female has yet been described. It has only been found in China.
