= Acantheis =

Scientific classification
- Domain: Eukaryota
- Kingdom: Animalia
- Phylum: Arthropoda
- Subphylum: Chelicerata
- Class: Arachnida
- Order: Araneae
- Infraorder: Araneomorphae
- Family: Ctenidae
- Genus: Acantheis; Thorell, 1891

Type species
- A. variatus (Thorell, 1890)

Species
- 9, see text

Genus of spiders

Acantheis is a genus of Asian wandering spiders first described by Tamerlan Thorell in 1891.

== Species ==
As of April 2019 it contains nine species:

- Acantheis boetonensis (Strand, 1913) – Indonesia (Sulawesi)
- Acantheis celer (Simon, 1897) – Indonesia (Java)
- Acantheis dimidiatus (Thorell, 1890) – Indonesia (Sumatra)
- Acantheis indicus Gravely, 1931 – India
- Acantheis laetus (Thorell, 1890) – Borneo
- Acantheis longiventris Simon, 1897 – Malaysia, Indonesia
- Acantheis nipponicus Ono, 2008 – Japan
- Acantheis oreus (Simon, 1901) – Malaysia
- Acantheis variatus (Thorell, 1890) (type) – Indonesia (Nias Is.)
