= Ohvida =

Scientific classification
- Domain: Eukaryota
- Kingdom: Animalia
- Phylum: Arthropoda
- Subphylum: Chelicerata
- Class: Arachnida
- Order: Araneae
- Infraorder: Araneomorphae
- Family: Ctenidae
- Genus: Ohvida; Polotow & Brescovit, 2009

Type species
- O. fulvorufa (Franganillo, 1930)

Species
- 9, see text

Genus of spiders

Ohvida is a genus of Caribbean wandering spiders first described by D. Polotow & Antônio Brescovit in 2009.

== Species ==
As of April 2019 it contains nine species:

- Ohvida andros Polotow & Brescovit, 2009 – Bahama Is.
- Ohvida bimini Polotow & Brescovit, 2009 – Bahama Is.
- Ohvida brevitarsus (Bryant, 1940) – Cuba
- Ohvida coxana (Bryant, 1940) – Cuba
- Ohvida fulvorufa (Franganillo, 1930) (type) – Cuba
- Ohvida isolata (Bryant, 1940) – Cuba
- Ohvida modesta (Bryant, 1942) – Puerto Rico
- Ohvida turquino Polotow & Brescovit, 2009 – Cuba
- Ohvida vernalis (Bryant, 1940) – Cuba
