= Piloctenus =

Scientific classification
- Kingdom: Animalia
- Phylum: Arthropoda
- Subphylum: Chelicerata
- Class: Arachnida
- Order: Araneae
- Infraorder: Araneomorphae
- Family: Ctenidae
- Genus: Piloctenus; Henrard & Jocqué, 2017

Type species
- P. pilosus (Thorell, 1899)

Species
- 4, see text

Genus of spiders

Piloctenus is a genus of wandering spiders first described by A. Henrard & Rudy Jocqué in 2017.

== Species ==
As of April 2019 it contains four species:

- Piloctenus gryseelsi Henrard & Jocqué, 2017 — Guinea
- Piloctenus haematostoma Jocqué & Henrard, 2017 — Guinea
- Piloctenus mirificus (Arts, 1912) — Togo, Ivory Coast, Guinea
- Piloctenus pilosus (Thorell, 1899) — West, Central Africa
