= Caloctenus =

Scientific classification
- Domain: Eukaryota
- Kingdom: Animalia
- Phylum: Arthropoda
- Subphylum: Chelicerata
- Class: Arachnida
- Order: Araneae
- Infraorder: Araneomorphae
- Family: Ctenidae
- Genus: Caloctenus; Keyserling, 1877

Type species
- C. aculeatus Keyserling, 1877

Species
- 6, see text

Genus of spiders

Caloctenus is a genus of wandering spiders first described by Eugen von Keyserling in 1877.

== Species ==
As of April 2019 it contains six species:

- Caloctenus abyssinicus Strand, 1917 – Ethiopia
- Caloctenus aculeatus Keyserling, 1877 (type) – Colombia
- Caloctenus albertoi Hazzi & Silva-Dávila, 2012 – Colombia
- Caloctenus carbonera Silva-Dávila, 2004 – Venezuela
- Caloctenus gracilitarsis Simon, 1897 – Venezuela
- Caloctenus oxapampa Silva-Dávila, 2004 – Peru
