= Leptoctenus =

Scientific classification
- Domain: Eukaryota
- Kingdom: Animalia
- Phylum: Arthropoda
- Subphylum: Chelicerata
- Class: Arachnida
- Order: Araneae
- Infraorder: Araneomorphae
- Family: Ctenidae
- Genus: Leptoctenus; L. Koch, 1878

Type species
- L. agalenoides L. Koch, 1878

Species
- 6, see text

Genus of spiders

Leptoctenus is a genus of wandering spiders first described by L. Koch in 1878.

== Species ==
As of April 2019 it contains six species:

- Leptoctenus agalenoides L. Koch, 1878 (type) – Australia
- Leptoctenus byrrhus Simon, 1888 – USA, Mexico
- Leptoctenus daoxianensis Yin, Tang & Gong, 2000 – China
- Leptoctenus gertschi Peck, 1981 – Mexico
- Leptoctenus paradoxus (F. O. Pickard-Cambridge, 1900) – Panama
- Leptoctenus sonoraensis Peck, 1981 – Mexico
