= Petaloctenus =

Scientific classification
- Kingdom: Animalia
- Phylum: Arthropoda
- Subphylum: Chelicerata
- Class: Arachnida
- Order: Araneae
- Infraorder: Araneomorphae
- Family: Ctenidae
- Genus: Petaloctenus; Jocqué & Steyn, 1997

Type species
- P. bossema Jocqué & Steyn, 1997

Species
- 5, see text

Genus of spiders

Petaloctenus is a genus of African wandering spiders first described by Rudy Jocqué & T. Steyn in 1997.

== Species ==
As of April 2019 it contains five species:

- Petaloctenus bossema Jocqué & Steyn, 1997 (type) – Ivory Coast
- Petaloctenus clathratus (Thorell, 1899) – Cameroon
- Petaloctenus cupido Van der Donckt & Jocqué, 2001 – Guinea
- Petaloctenus lunatus Van der Donckt & Jocqué, 2001 – Nigeria
- Petaloctenus songan Jocqué & Steyn, 1997 – Ivory Coast
