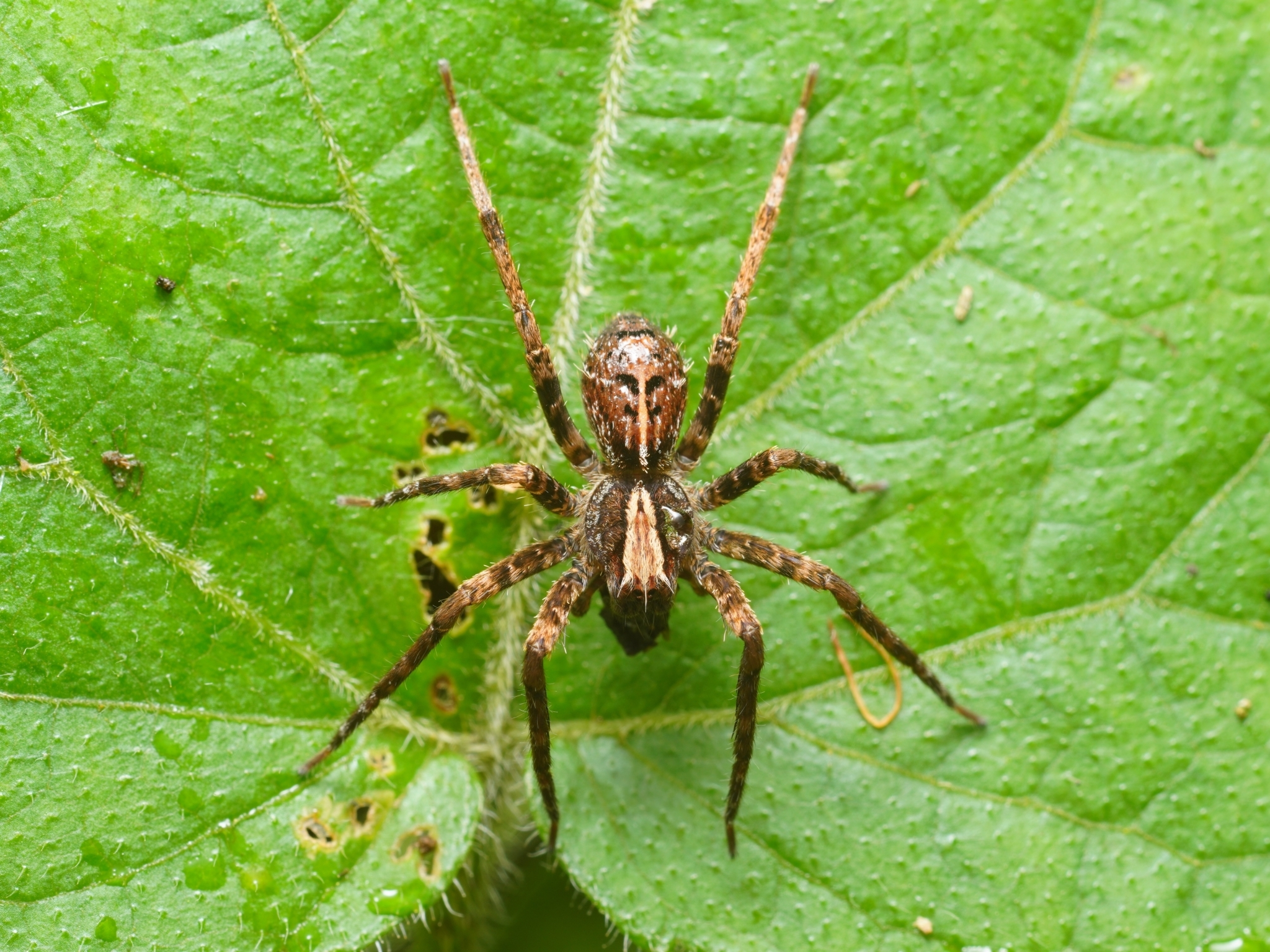
- Chococtenus miserabilis

Scientific classification
- Kingdom: Animalia
- Phylum: Arthropoda
- Subphylum: Chelicerata
- Class: Arachnida
- Order: Araneae
- Infraorder: Araneomorphae
- Family: Ctenidae
- Genus: Chococtenus; Dupérré

Type species
- Chococtenus otonga

Species
- 15, see text

= Chococtenus =

Genus of spiders

Chococtenus is a genus of spiders in the family Ctenidae. It was first described in 2015 by Dupérré. As of 2017, it contains 15 species, all from South America.

== Species ==
Chococtenus comprises the following species:

- Chococtenus acanthoctenoides (Schmidt, 1956)
- Chococtenus cappuccino Dupérré, 2015
- Chococtenus cuchilla Dupérré, 2015
- Chococtenus duendecito Dupérré, 2015
- Chococtenus fantasma Dupérré, 2015
- Chococtenus kashakara Dupérré, 2015
- Chococtenus lasdamas Dupérré, 2015
- Chococtenus luchoi Dupérré, 2015
- Chococtenus miserabilis (Strand, 1916)
- Chococtenus neblina Dupérré, 2015
- Chococtenus otonga Dupérré, 2015
- Chococtenus otongachi Dupérré, 2015
- Chococtenus piemontana Dupérré, 2015
- Chococtenus suffuscus Dupérré, 2015
- Chococtenus waitti Dupérré, 2015
