= Tuticanus =

Scientific classification
- Kingdom: Animalia
- Phylum: Arthropoda
- Subphylum: Chelicerata
- Class: Arachnida
- Order: Araneae
- Infraorder: Araneomorphae
- Family: Ctenidae
- Genus: Tuticanus; Simon, 1897

Type species
- T. cruciatus Simon, 1897

Species
- T. cruciatus Simon, 1897 – Ecuador; T. major (Keyserling, 1879) – Peru

Genus of spiders

Tuticanus is a genus of South American wandering spiders first described by Eugène Simon in 1897. As of April 2019 it contains only two species: T. cruciatus and T. major.
