= Califorctenus =

Scientific classification
- Kingdom: Animalia
- Phylum: Arthropoda
- Subphylum: Chelicerata
- Class: Arachnida
- Order: Araneae
- Infraorder: Araneomorphae
- Family: Ctenidae
- Genus: Califorctenus
- Species: C. cacachilensis

Binomial name
- Califorctenus cacachilensis Jiménez, Berrian, Polotow & Palacios-Cardiel, 2017

Genus of spiders

Califorctenus is a genus of spiders in the family Ctenidae. It was first described in 2017 by Jiménez, Berrian, Polotow, and Palacios-Cardiel. As of 2017, it contains only one species, Califorctenus cacachilensis, also known as the Sierra Cacachilas wandering spider.

== Califorctenus cacachilensis ==
Califorctenus cacachilensis is named after the Sierra de las Cacachilas mountain range in Baja California Sur, where it was first found in an abandoned mine by Michael Wall and Jim Berrian, researchers from the San Diego Natural History Museum, during an expedition on November 4, 2013.

We think it's a new species. The spider, from leg to leg, is about softball-sized. Its abdomen is the size of two quarters. It's like a small-sized tarantula, but much daintier, not as husky. It's quite bald, and its abdomen is mustard brown with iridescence.

— Michael Wall, 2014 Union-Tribune article

Subsequent collaboration with María Jimenez, an entomologist from Mexico who identified it as a member of the Ctenidae or wandering spider family, confirmed it was a new species and genus. Berrian initially noted shed exoskeletons during the 2013 expedition, and eventually found two dozen spiders, bringing eight back to San Diego for further study. He received a spider bite during the expedition, which he described as "like being poked by a cactus spine and a little mild pain."
