= Trogloctenus =

Scientific classification
- Kingdom: Animalia
- Phylum: Arthropoda
- Subphylum: Chelicerata
- Class: Arachnida
- Order: Araneae
- Infraorder: Araneomorphae
- Family: Ctenidae
- Genus: Trogloctenus; Lessert, 1935

Type species
- T. fagei (Lessert, 1935)

Species
- T. briali Ledoux, 2004 – Réunion; T. fagei (Lessert, 1935) – Congo

Genus of spiders

Trogloctenus is a genus of wandering spiders first described by R. de Lessert in 1935. As of April 2019 it contains only two species: T. briali and T. fagei. Originally placed as a subgenus of Ctenus, it was raised to genus status in 1967.
