= Guasuctenus =

Scientific classification
- Kingdom: Animalia
- Phylum: Arthropoda
- Subphylum: Chelicerata
- Class: Arachnida
- Order: Araneae
- Infraorder: Araneomorphae
- Family: Ctenidae
- Genus: Guasuctenus; Polotow & Brescovit, 2019

Type species
- Ctenus griseus (Keyserling, 1891)

Species
- Guasuctenus longipes (Keyserling, 1891); Guasuctenus vittatissimus (Strand, 1916)

Genus of spiders

Guasuctenus is a small genus of South American wandering spiders first described by D. Polotow and Antônio Domingos Brescovit in 2019. As of November 2021 it contains only two species: G. longipes and G. vittatissimus. The type species was originally described under the name "Ctenus griseus.

== See also ==
- Ctenus
