= Nimbanahita =

Scientific classification
- Kingdom: Animalia
- Phylum: Arthropoda
- Subphylum: Chelicerata
- Class: Arachnida
- Order: Araneae
- Infraorder: Araneomorphae
- Family: Ctenidae
- Genus: Nimbanahita; Henrard & Jocqué, 2017
- Species: N. montivaga

Binomial name
- Nimbanahita montivaga Henrard & Jocqué, 2017

Genus of spiders

Nimbanahita is a genus of wandering spiders containing the single species, Nimbanahita montivaga. It was first described by A. Henrard & Rudy Jocqué in 2017, and is only found in Guinea.
