= Thoriosa =

Scientific classification
- Kingdom: Animalia
- Phylum: Arthropoda
- Subphylum: Chelicerata
- Class: Arachnida
- Order: Araneae
- Infraorder: Araneomorphae
- Family: Ctenidae
- Genus: Thoriosa; Simon, 1910

Type species
- T. fulvastra Simon, 1910

Species
- 4, see text

Genus of spiders

Thoriosa is a genus of African wandering spiders first described by Eugène Simon in 1910.

== Species ==
As of April 2019 it contains four species:

- Thoriosa fulvastra Simon, 1910 (type) – São Tomé and Príncipe, Sierra Leone
- Thoriosa spadicea (Simon, 1910) – São Tomé and Príncipe
- Thoriosa spinivulva (Simon, 1910) – São Tomé and Príncipe
- Thoriosa taurina (Simon, 1910) – São Tomé and Príncipe, Equatorial Guinea (Annobon Is.)
