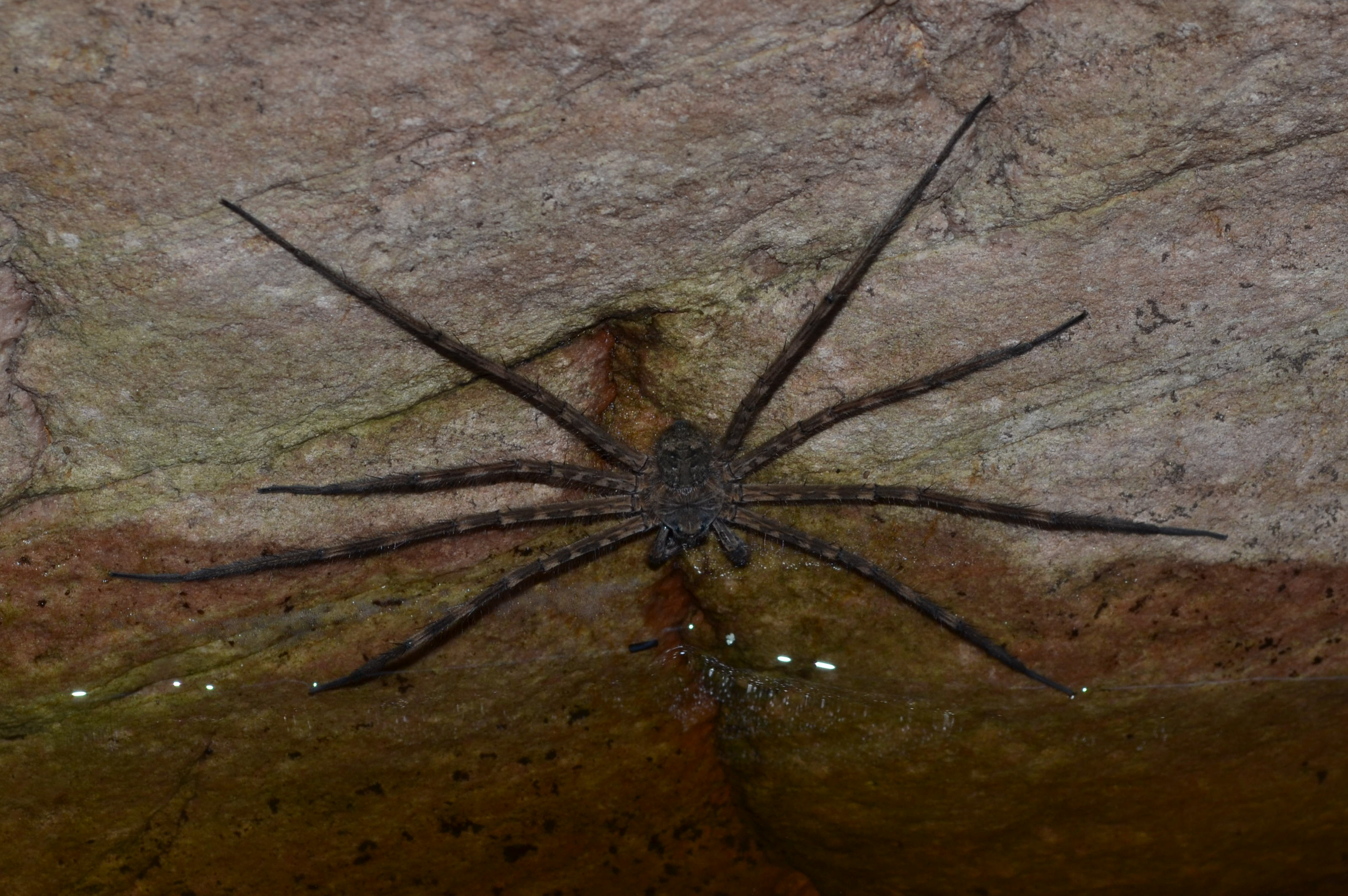
- Enoploctenus cyclothorax

Scientific classification
- Domain: Eukaryota
- Kingdom: Animalia
- Phylum: Arthropoda
- Subphylum: Chelicerata
- Class: Arachnida
- Order: Araneae
- Infraorder: Araneomorphae
- Family: Ctenidae
- Genus: Enoploctenus; Simon, 1897

Type species
- E. cyclothorax (Bertkau, 1880)

Species
- 8, see text

= Enoploctenus =

Genus of spiders

Enoploctenus is a genus of wandering spiders first described by Eugène Simon in 1897.

== Species ==
As of April 2019 it contains eight species:

- Enoploctenus cyclothorax (Bertkau, 1880) (type) – Brazil
- Enoploctenus distinctus (Caporiacco, 1947) – Guyana
- Enoploctenus inazensis (Strand, 1909) – Ecuador
- Enoploctenus luteovittatus (Simon, 1898) – St. Vincent
- Enoploctenus maculipes Strand, 1909 – Brazil
- Enoploctenus morbidus Mello-Leitão, 1939 – Brazil
- Enoploctenus pedatissimus Strand, 1909 – Ecuador, Brazil
- Enoploctenus penicilliger (Simon, 1898) – St. Vincent
