= Amicactenus =

Scientific classification
- Kingdom: Animalia
- Phylum: Arthropoda
- Subphylum: Chelicerata
- Class: Arachnida
- Order: Araneae
- Infraorder: Araneomorphae
- Family: Ctenidae
- Genus: Amicactenus; Henrard & Jocqué, 2017

Type species
- A. pergulanus (Arts, 1912)

Species
- 4, see text

Genus of spiders

Amicactenus is a genus of wandering spiders first described by A. Henrard & Rudy Jocqué in 2017.

== Species ==
As of April 2019 it contains four species:

- Amicactenus eminens (Arts, 1912) — Togo, Ivory Coast
- Amicactenus fallax (Steyn & Van der Donckt, 2003) — Ivory Coast
- Amicactenus mysticus Henrard & Jocqué, 2017 — Guinea, Liberia
- Amicactenus pergulanus (Arts, 1912) — West, Central Africa
