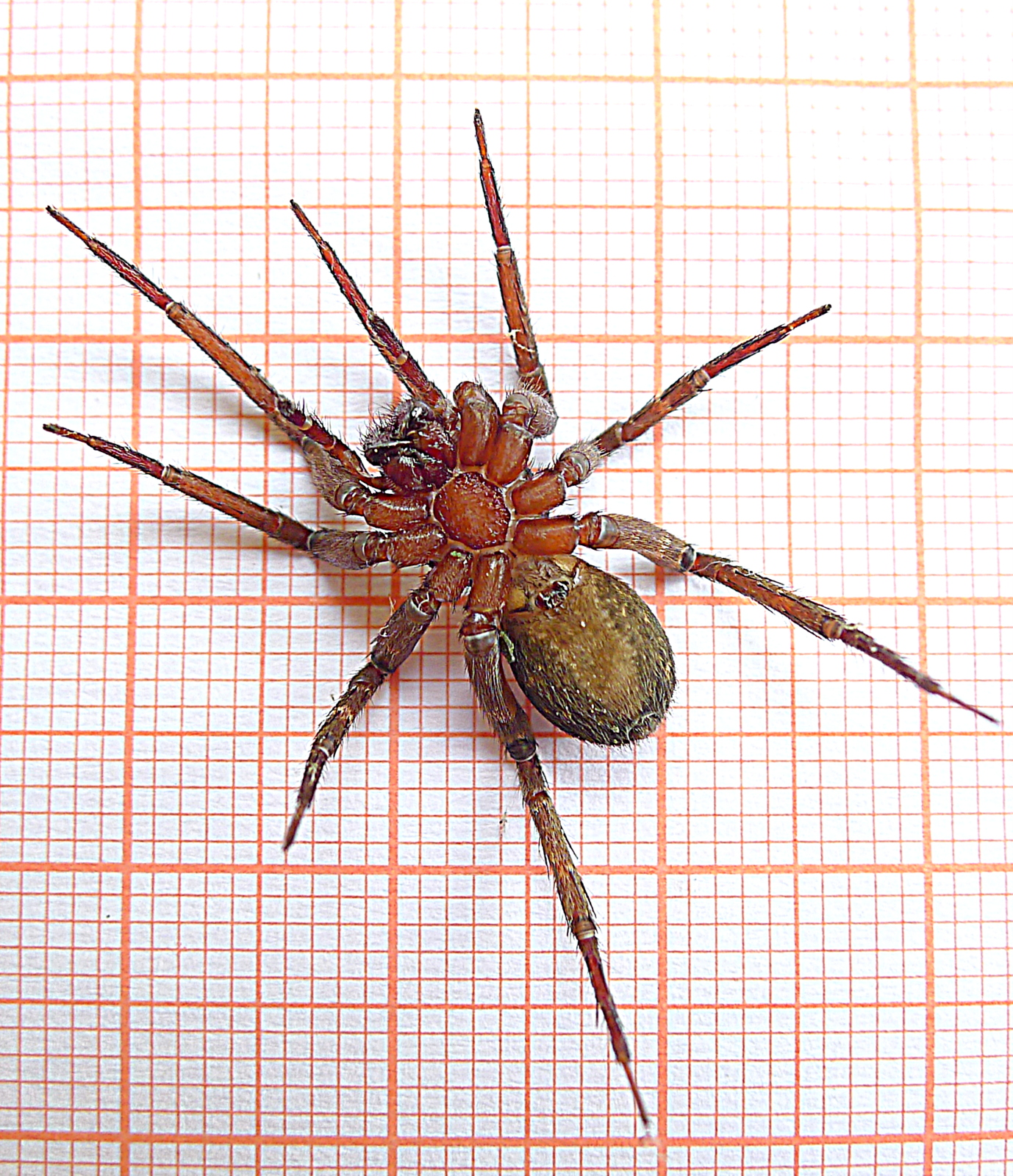

Scientific classification
- Kingdom: Animalia
- Phylum: Arthropoda
- Subphylum: Chelicerata
- Class: Arachnida
- Order: Araneae
- Infraorder: Araneomorphae
- Family: Ctenidae
- Genus: Isoctenus; Bertkau, 1880

Type species
- I. foliifer Bertkau, 1880

Species
- 15, see text

Synonyms
- Ctenopsis Schmidt, 1956

= Isoctenus =

Genus of spiders

Isoctenus is a genus of South American wandering spiders first described by Philipp Bertkau in 1880.

== Species ==
As of April 2019 it contains fifteen species found in Brazil and Argentina:

- Isoctenus areia Polotow & Brescovit, 2009 – Brazil
- Isoctenus charada Polotow & Brescovit, 2009 – Brazil
- Isoctenus corymbus Polotow, Brescovit & Pellegatti-Franco, 2005 – Brazil
- Isoctenus coxalis (F. O. Pickard-Cambridge, 1902) – Brazil
- Isoctenus eupalaestrus Mello-Leitão, 1936 – Brazil
- Isoctenus foliifer Bertkau, 1880 (type) – Brazil
- Isoctenus griseolus (Mello-Leitão, 1936) – Brazil
- Isoctenus herteli (Mello-Leitão, 1947) – Brazil
- Isoctenus janeirus (Walckenaer, 1837) – Brazil
- Isoctenus malabaris Polotow, Brescovit & Ott, 2007 – Brazil
- Isoctenus minusculus (Keyserling, 1891) – Brazil
- Isoctenus ordinario Polotow & Brescovit, 2009 – Brazil, Argentina
- Isoctenus segredo Polotow & Brescovit, 2009 – Brazil
- Isoctenus strandi Mello-Leitão, 1936 – Brazil
- Isoctenus taperae (Mello-Leitão, 1936) – Brazil
