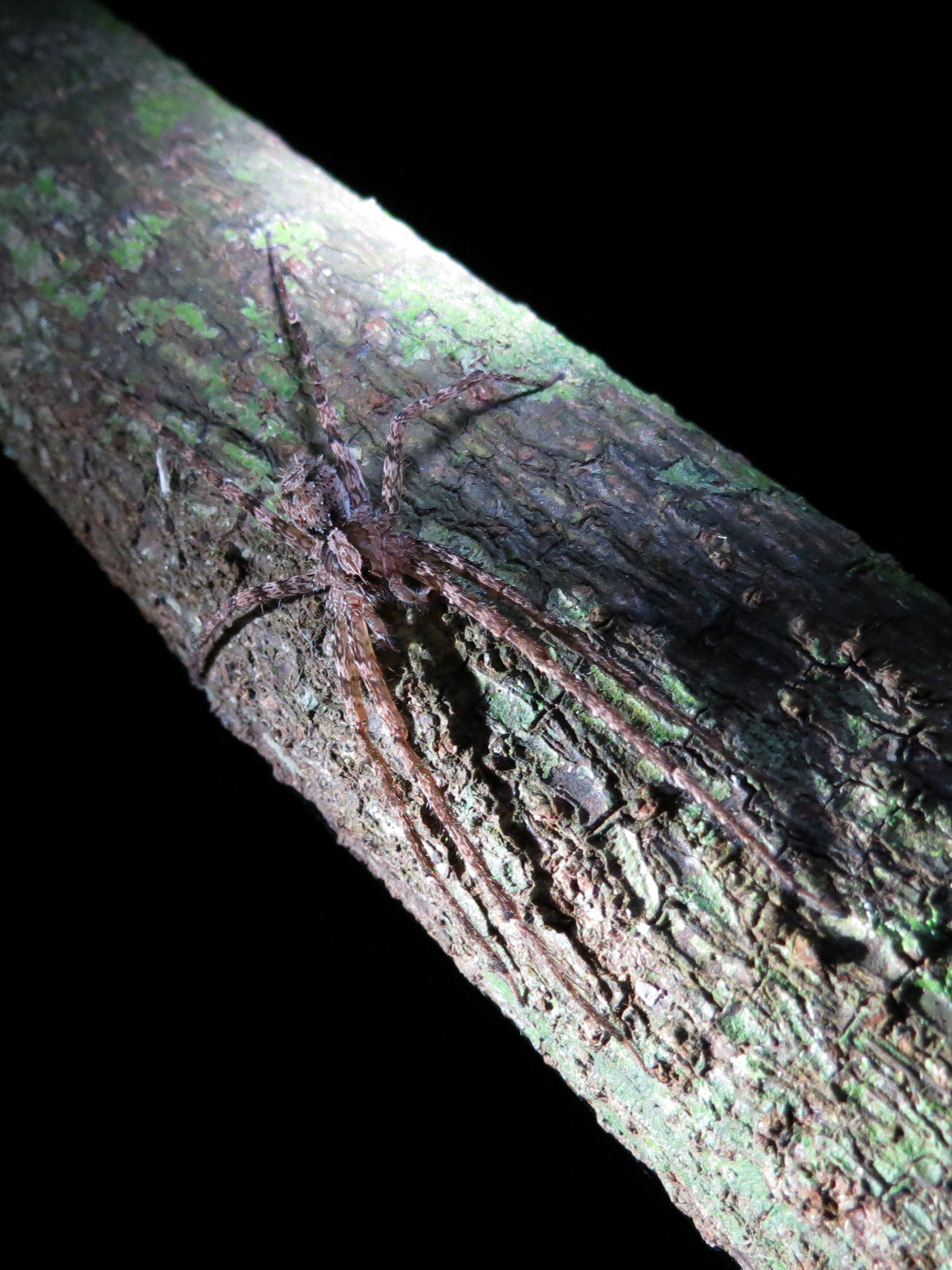
- Acanthoctenus sp.
- Eye pattern of male A. remotus

Scientific classification
- Domain: Eukaryota
- Kingdom: Animalia
- Phylum: Arthropoda
- Subphylum: Chelicerata
- Class: Arachnida
- Order: Araneae
- Infraorder: Araneomorphae
- Family: Ctenidae
- Genus: Acanthoctenus; Keyserling, 1877

Type species
- A. spiniger Keyserling, 1877

Species
- 13, see text

Synonyms
- Paracantheis Keyserling, 1877

= Acanthoctenus =

Genus of spiders

Acanthoctenus is a genus of Central to South American wandering spiders first described by Eugen von Keyserling in 1877.

Female A. remotus are larger than males of the species, reaching a body length of about 15 millimetres (0.59 in). Males only grow up to 11 millimetres (0.43 in).

== Species ==
Acanthoctenus currently contains 13 described species:

- Acanthoctenus alux Arizala, Labarque & Polotow, 2021 – Guatemala
- Acanthoctenus chickeringi Arizala, Labarque & Polotow, 2021 – Panama
- Acanthoctenus dumicola Simon, 1906 – Venezuela
- Acanthoctenus gaujoni Simon, 1906 – Venezuela, Ecuador
- Acanthoctenus kollari (Reimoser, 1939) – Costa Rica
- Acanthoctenus lamarrei Arizala, Labarque & Polotow, 2021 – Panama
- Acanthoctenus manauara Arizala, Labarque & Polotow, 2021 – Brazil
- Acanthoctenus plebejus Simon, 1906 – Venezuela, Peru
- Acanthoctenus remotus Chickering, 1960 – Jamaica
- Acanthoctenus spiniger Keyserling, 1877 (type) – Mexico to Venezuela
- Acanthoctenus spinipes Keyserling, 1877 – Guatemala to Paraguay
- Acanthoctenus torotoro Arizala, Labarque & Polotow, 2021 – Bolivia
- Acanthoctenus virginea (Kraus, 1955) – El Salvador

Incertae sedis:

- Acanthoctenus maculatus Petrunkevitch, 1925 – Panama (species inquirenda)
- Acanthoctenus obauratus Simon, 1906 – Brazil
- Acanthoctenus rubrotaeniatus Mello-Leitão, 1947 – Brazil

Acanthoctenus mammifer was formerly placed in this genus, but was transferred to the genus Viracucha.
