= Toca (spider) =

Scientific classification
- Kingdom: Animalia
- Phylum: Arthropoda
- Subphylum: Chelicerata
- Class: Arachnida
- Order: Araneae
- Infraorder: Araneomorphae
- Family: Ctenidae
- Genus: Toca; Polotow & Brescovit, 2009

Type species
- T. bossanova Polotow & Brescovit, 2009

Species
- 2, see text

Genus of spiders

Toca is a genus of South American wandering spiders first described by D. Polotow & Antônio Brescovit in 2009. Both described species are endemic to Brazil.

== Species ==
As of January 2026, this genus includes two species:

- Toca bossanova Polotow & Brescovit, 2009 – Brazil
- Toca samba Polotow & Brescovit, 2009 – Brazil
