= Viracucha =

Scientific classification
- Kingdom: Animalia
- Phylum: Arthropoda
- Subphylum: Chelicerata
- Class: Arachnida
- Order: Araneae
- Infraorder: Araneomorphae
- Family: Ctenidae
- Genus: Viracucha; Lehtinen, 1967

Type species
- V. andicola (Simon, 1906)

Species
- 7, see text

Genus of spiders

Viracucha is a genus of South American wandering spiders first described by Pekka T. Lehtinen in 1967.

== Species ==
As of April 2021, Viracucha contained seven species:

- Viracucha andicola (Simon, 1906) – Bolivia
- Viracucha exilis (Mello-Leitão, 1936) – Brazil
- Viracucha mammifer (Mello-Leitão, 1939) – Brazil
- Viracucha misionesicus (Mello-Leitão, 1945) – Argentina
- Viracucha paraguayensis (Strand, 1909) – Brazil, Paraguay
- Viracucha ridleyi (F. O. Pickard-Cambridge, 1897) – Brazil
- Viracucha silvicola (Soares & Soares, 1946) – Brazil
