= Janusia =

Scientific classification
- Domain: Eukaryota
- Kingdom: Animalia
- Phylum: Arthropoda
- Subphylum: Chelicerata
- Class: Arachnida
- Order: Araneae
- Infraorder: Araneomorphae
- Family: Ctenidae
- Genus: Janusia; Gray, 1973
- Species: J. muiri

Binomial name
- Janusia muiri Gray, 1973

Genus of spiders

Janusia is a monotypic genus of Australian wandering spiders containing the single species, Janusia muiri. It was first described by Michael R. Gray in 1973, and has only been found in Australia. Originally placed with the Miturgidae, it was moved to the Ctenidae in 1989.
