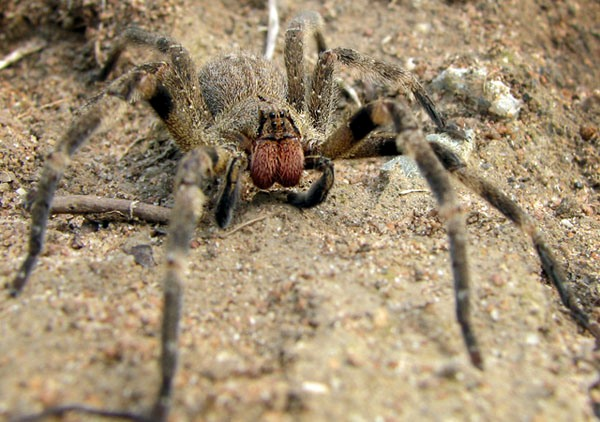
- Phoneutria nigriventer
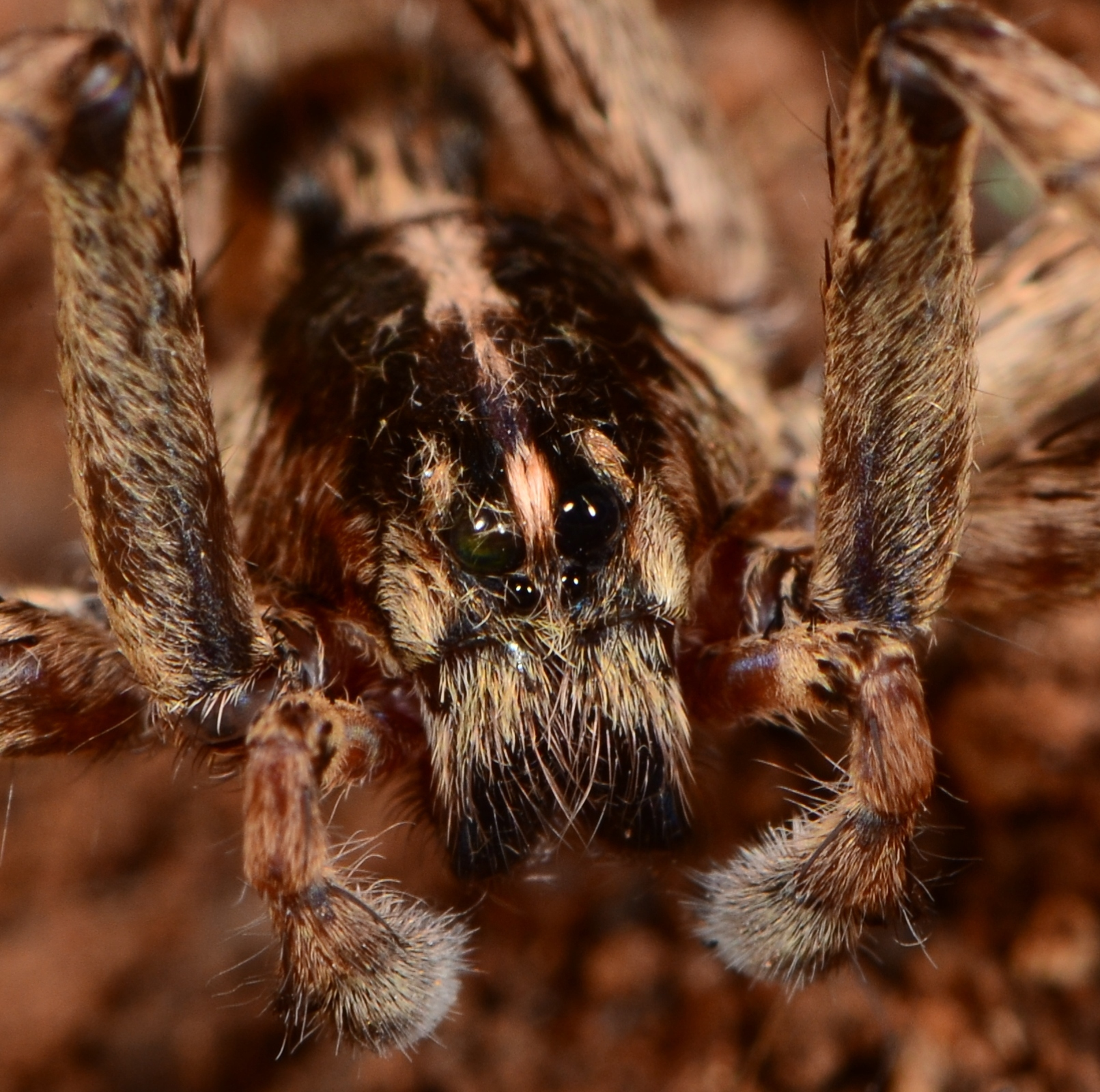
- Male Ctenus caligineus

Scientific classification
- Kingdom: Animalia
- Phylum: Arthropoda
- Subphylum: Chelicerata
- Class: Arachnida
- Order: Araneae
- Infraorder: Araneomorphae
- Family: Ctenidae; Keyserling, 1877

Diversity
- 49 genera, 533 species
- blue: reported countries (WSC) green: observation hotspots (iNaturalist)

= Wandering spider =

Wandering spiders Temporal range: Neogene–present

Family of spiders

Wandering spiders (Ctenidae) are a family of spiders that includes the Brazilian wandering spiders. These spiders have a distinctive longitudinal groove on the top-rear of their oval carapace similar to those of the Amaurobiidae.

They are highly defensive and venomous nocturnal hunters. Wandering spiders are known to hunt large prey, for example hylid species Dendropsophus branneri. Despite their notoriety for being dangerous, only a few members of Phoneutria have venom known to be hazardous to humans, but the venoms of this family are poorly known, so all larger ctenids should be treated with caution.

== Genera ==
As of September 2025, the World Spider Catalog accepted the following genera:

- Acantheis Thorell, 1891 – Asia
- Acanthoctenus Keyserling, 1877 – South America, Central America, Jamaica, Mexico
- Africactenus Hyatt, 1954 – Africa, India
- Afroneutria Polotow & Jocqué, 2015 – Africa
- Amauropelma Raven, Stumkat & Gray, 2001 – Asia, Australia
- Amicactenus Henrard & Jocqué, 2017 – Africa
- Anahita Karsch, 1879 – Africa, Asia, United States
- Apolania Simon, 1898 – Seychelles
- Arctenus Polotow & Jocqué, 2014 – Kenya
- Asthenoctenus Simon, 1897 – South America
- Bengalla Gray & Thompson, 2001 – Australia
- Bowie Jäger, 2022
- Bulboctenus Pereira, Labarque & Polotow, 2020 – Brazil
- Califorctenus Jiménez, Berrian, Polotow & Palacios-Cardiel, 2017
- Caloctenus Keyserling, 1877 – Ethiopia, South America
- Celaetycheus Simon, 1897 – Brazil
- Centroctenus Mello-Leitão, 1929, including Parabatinga Polotow & Brescovit, 2009 – South America
- Chococtenus Dupérré, 2015 – Ecuador, Colombia
- Ciba Bloom, Binford, Esposito, Alayón, Peterson, Nishida, Loubet-Senear & Agnarsson, 2014 – Cuba, Dominican Republic
- Ctenus Walckenaer, 1805 – Africa, South America, Oceania, Central America, Asia, North America, Caribbean
- Diallomus Simon, 1897 – Sri Lanka
- Eldivo Hazzi & Hormiga, 2024
- Enoploctenus Simon, 1897 – South America, Saint Vincent and the Grenadines
- Gephyroctenus Mello-Leitão, 1936 – Brazil, Peru
- Guasuctenus Polotow & Brescovit, 2019
- Isoctenus Bertkau, 1880 – Brazil, Argentina
- Janusia Gray, 1973 – Australia
- Kiekie Polotow & Brescovit, 2018 – Colombia, Central America, Mexico
- Leptoctenus L. Koch, 1878 – Australia, North America, Panama
- Macroctenus Henrard & Jocqué, 2017 – Guinea
- Montescueia Carcavallo & Martínez, 1961 – Argentina
- Nimbanahita Henrard & Jocqué, 2017 – Guinea
- Nothroctenus Badcock, 1932 – Brazil, Bolivia, Paraguay
- Ohvida Polotow & Brescovit, 2009 – Cuba
- Perictenus Henrard & Jocqué, 2017 – Guinea
- Petaloctenus Jocqué & Steyn, 1997 – Africa
- Phoneutria Perty, 1833 – South America
- Phymatoctenus Simon, 1897 – Brazil, Guyana, Costa Rica
- Piloctenus Henrard & Jocqué, 2017 – Guinea, Togo, Ivory Coast
- Sinoctenus Marusik, Zhang & Omelko, 2012
- Spinoctenus Hazzi, Polotow, Brescovit, González-Obando & Simó, 2018
- Thoriosa Simon, 1910 – São Tomé and Príncipe, Sierra Leone, Equatorial Guinea
- Toca Polotow & Brescovit, 2009 – Brazil
- Trogloctenus Lessert, 1935 – Congo
- Trujillina Bryant, 1948 – Caribbean
- Tuticanus Simon, 1897 – Ecuador, Peru
- Viracucha Lehtinen, 1967 – South America
- Wiedenmeyeria Schenkel, 1953 – Venezuela

Formerly placed in this family:

- Mahafalytenus Silva-Dávila, 2007; now in Viridasiidae
