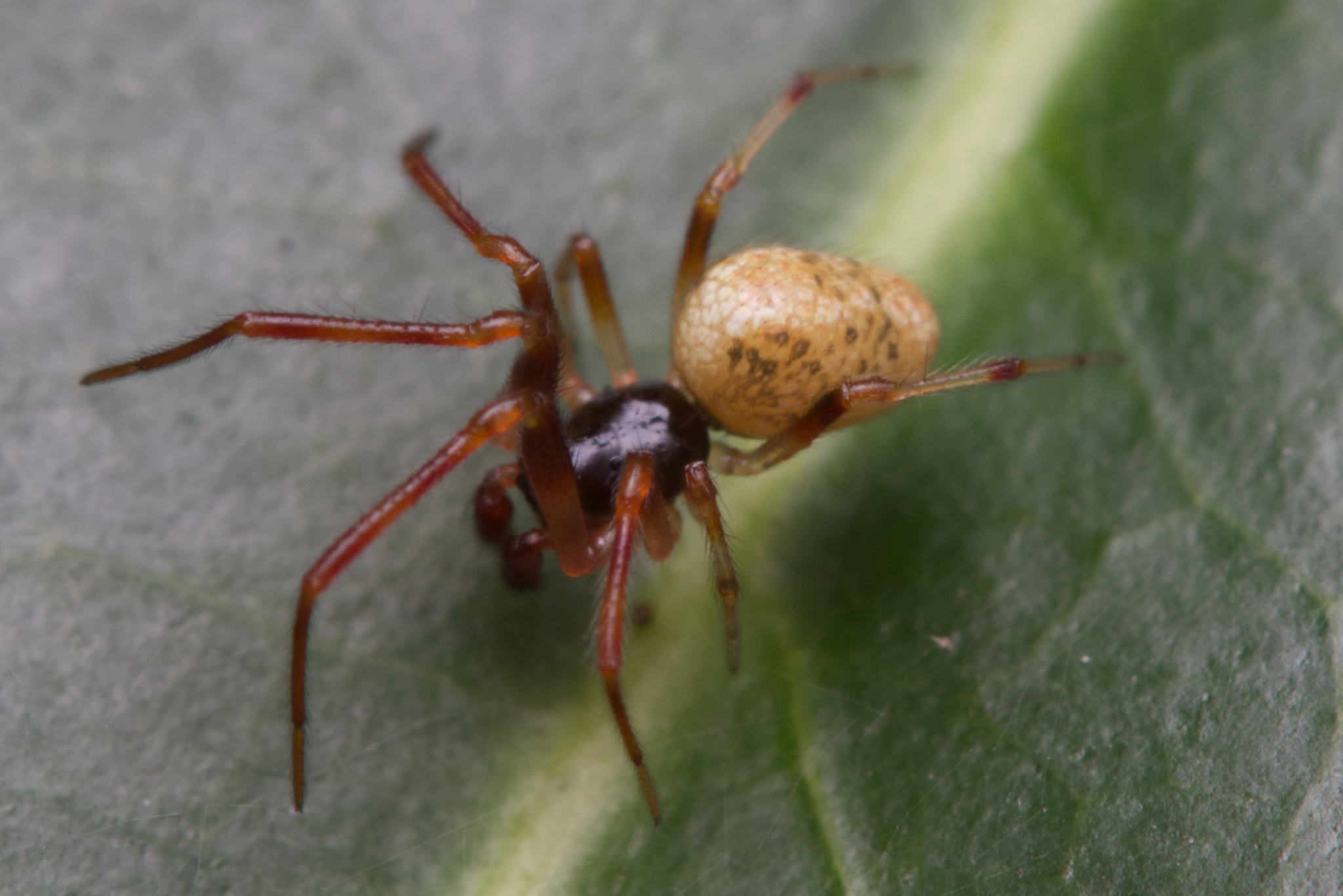

Scientific classification
- Kingdom: Animalia
- Phylum: Arthropoda
- Subphylum: Chelicerata
- Class: Arachnida
- Order: Araneae
- Infraorder: Araneomorphae
- Family: Theridiidae
- Genus: Anelosimus
- Species: A. pratchetti

Binomial name
- Anelosimus pratchetti Agnarsson, 2012

= Anelosimus pratchetti =

Species of spider

Anelosimus pratchetti is a species of tangle-web spider found in New South Wales, Australia. Initial field observations indicate it is a subsocial spider. It lives in low elevation environments, including beachfront mangrove forests. It was identified by Ingi Agnarsson in 2012, who named the species after Terry Pratchett, whom Agnarsson described as "a comic genius".

== Description ==
The total length of the spider is approximately 2.4 to 3.6 millimetres (0.094 to 0.142 in), with females slightly larger than the males. The colouration pattern is similar to others in its genus: the prosoma is light yellow with grey lines, while the abdomen is lighter in colour with spots clustering off the midline.

Its primary diagnostic characteristic is the shape of the genitals. In males, the embolus is corkscrew-shaped. A similar shape is found in Anelosimus luckyi, although the embolus is longer in A. pratchetti. The female can be distinguished from others in the genus by the shape of the copulatory ducts and a unique triangular epigynal plate.

== Distribution and genetics ==
The holotype specimen was collected from Berowra Valley Regional Park, at an elevation of approximately 100 metres (330 ft). Additional specimens have been collected from Toolijooa at elevations of approximately 0 to 5 metres (0 to 16 ft). The species has only been found in Australia. The holotype and several paratypes were curated by the National Museum of Natural History.

The species' uniqueness and placement in the genus has been confirmed by analysis of nuclear and mitochondrial DNA. Phylogenetic analysis indicates a closer link between Anelosimus pratchetti and two Madagascar species, Anelosimus sallee and Anelosimus may, than several geographically closer species within the same genus. The species on Madagascar have previously been identified as arriving in multiple migration events. The finding further illustrates the complexity of migration within the genus.

== Sociality ==
Spiders within the genus Anelosimus have been studied due to their social structure. Most of the species within the genus are social or subsocial, with solitary species in the genus occurring within a single clade. Not all species within the clade are solitary, however, indicating a reversal within the clade. Two species closely related to A. pratchetti, A. may and A. sallee, have both been identified as subsocial. Preliminary observations on A. pratchetti indicate it is subsocial as well.
