= Anelosimus oritoyacu =

Scientific classification
- Kingdom: Animalia
- Phylum: Arthropoda
- Subphylum: Chelicerata
- Class: Arachnida
- Order: Araneae
- Infraorder: Araneomorphae
- Family: Theridiidae
- Genus: Anelosimus
- Species: A. oritoyacu

Binomial name
- Anelosimus oritoyacu Agnarsson, 2006

Species of spider

Anelosimus oritoyacu is a species of tangle-web spider found in Ecuador and Mexico at altitudes from 1,800 to 2,000 metres (5,900 to 6,600 ft). It is subsocial, although it has some features which distinguish it from other social or subsocial spiders in the genus. It has long-lived nest sites, unlike the social spider Anelosimus eximius which has more transitory nest sites, and its webs do not have aerial threads found in other social and sub-social species. It has a female-biased sex ratio, which is indicative of social behavior, although its sex ratio is smaller than other social species. It was first identified as distinct from Anelosimus studiosus in 2006 by Ingi Agnarsson. It is named for Oritoyacu, Ecuador, where the type specimen was collected.

== Description ==
Specific to specimens from Ecuador, males range in size between 2.80 to 3.05 millimetres (0.110 to 0.120 in), and females between 3.35 to 3.70 millimetres (0.132 to 0.146 in). Specimens collected in Mexico are larger. Prosoma is brown with grey marks, while legs are pale brown, with darker brown at the tips. Males can be distinguished by the size of their embolus fork and embolus division b, while females have an epigynal plate which is high relative to its width.

== Distribution ==
All specimens collected have come from either Mexico or Ecuador, and the specimens collected in Mexico are uncertain in their assignment to this species. The collections have come from elevations of 1,800 to 2,000 metres (5,900 to 6,600 ft), which are among the highest collections of a social spider in this genus. Elevation appears to play a role in sociality within the Anelosimus genus, so the high elevation has been implicated as potentially explanatory of the unusually low sex ratio and other peculiarities of this species.
