= Anelosimus potmosbi =

Scientific classification
- Kingdom: Animalia
- Phylum: Arthropoda
- Subphylum: Chelicerata
- Class: Arachnida
- Order: Araneae
- Infraorder: Araneomorphae
- Family: Theridiidae
- Genus: Anelosimus
- Species: A. potmosbi

Binomial name
- Anelosimus potmosbi Agnarsson, 2012

Species of spider

Anelosimus potmosbi is a species of spider found in Papua New Guinea. It is found along the coast near Port Moresby. It is solitary, despite the sociality commonly found in the genus Anelosimus. The total length of individuals is approximate 2 to 3 millimetres (0.079 to 0.118 in), and it can be distinguished from other species by the genitalia: the male has an elongated corkscrew embolus, while the female has a simple copulatory duct trajectory. It is named for the name of Port Moresby in the Tok Pisin language.
