= Anelosimus monskenyensis =

Scientific classification
- Kingdom: Animalia
- Phylum: Arthropoda
- Subphylum: Chelicerata
- Class: Arachnida
- Order: Araneae
- Infraorder: Araneomorphae
- Family: Theridiidae
- Genus: Anelosimus
- Species: A. monskenyensis

Binomial name
- Anelosimus monskenyensis Agnarsson, 2006

Species of spider

Anelosimus monskenyensis is a small species of spider in the family Theridiidae. It has only been found on Mount Kenya, the location from which its name originates. Males range in size from 1.80 to 1.90 millimetres (0.071 to 0.075 in), while females range from 1.90 to 2.55 millimetres (0.075 to 0.100 in). Specimens were shades of brown and white, although color variation is not known. They may kleptoparasitically inhabit the webs of agelenid spiders, although this behavior is not found in other Anelosimus species. Agnarsson and Zhang find it more probable that A. monskenyensis is a social or semi-social spider.
