= Anelosimus amelie =

Scientific classification
- Kingdom: Animalia
- Phylum: Arthropoda
- Subphylum: Chelicerata
- Class: Arachnida
- Order: Araneae
- Infraorder: Araneomorphae
- Family: Theridiidae
- Genus: Anelosimus
- Species: A. amelie

Binomial name
- Anelosimus amelie Agnarsson, Kuntner, Coddington & Blackledge 2009

Species of spider

Anelosimus amelie is a species of spider in the family Theridiidae, closely related to Anelosimus decaryi. The species is important to the understanding of the evolution of spider sociality. The holotype and paratype specimens were collected in Mayotte within the Comoros Islands. The spider is named for Amélie Melkorka.

== Social behavior ==
A. amelie exhibits solitary behavior, while the Anelosimus genus is widely studied as a model taxon for spider sociality, owing to the large number of social and subsocial species in the genus. Unlike the rest of the genus, the lineage including A. amelie, A. decaryi, and A. pacificus all exhibit solitary behavior, although this is not universal among the other Anelosimus spiders of Madagascar and the Comoros Islands. This is suggestive that the solitary behavior in the lineage occurred before the radiation to the islands.
