= Anelosimus agnar =

Scientific classification
- Kingdom: Animalia
- Phylum: Arthropoda
- Subphylum: Chelicerata
- Class: Arachnida
- Order: Araneae
- Infraorder: Araneomorphae
- Family: Theridiidae
- Genus: Anelosimus
- Species: A. agnar

Binomial name
- Anelosimus agnar Agnarsson, 2006

Species of spider

Anelosimus agnar is a species of spider in the family Theridiidae. The holotype and paratype specimens were collected in Teluk Mahkota, Johor, Malaysia. Both specimens are female; this species currently lack information on males. The spider is named for Agnar Ingólfsson, the father of the discoverer, Ingi Agnarsson. Females can be identified as members of this species by unusually long and flimsy copulatory ducts. Females range in size from 2.05 to 2.40 millimetres (0.081 to 0.094 in). Both the holotype and paratype were collected from small webs at the tips of branches, from a forested area next to a beach.
