= Anelosimus terraincognita =

Scientific classification
- Kingdom: Animalia
- Phylum: Arthropoda
- Subphylum: Chelicerata
- Class: Arachnida
- Order: Araneae
- Infraorder: Araneomorphae
- Family: Theridiidae
- Genus: Anelosimus
- Species: A. terraincognita

Binomial name
- Anelosimus terraincognita Agnarsson, 2012

Species of spider

Anelosimus terraincognita is a species of spider discovered in the collection of the Rijksmuseum van Natuurlijke Historie, with no associated information regarding its collector or the location of discovery. Males possess a corkscrew-shaped embolus, a characteristic unique to Australasian species within the genus Anelosimus. This species is known only from the holotype specimen, which has a total length of 2.2 millimetres (0.087 in). It is named after the cartographic Latin phrase terra incognita, meaning unknown land.
