= Wes Burgess =

American psychiatrist, neuroscientist, and author

Joseph Wesley "Wes" Burgess is an American psychiatrist, neuroscientist, and author who has written books on animal behavior (ethology), nonverbal communication, and human consciousness. His main contribution has been to the understanding of the mind and social relationships.

== Early life and education ==
Burgess was born in Dumas, Texas to Wes and Dorothea Burgess. His family moved to St. Louis Missouri where he graduated from Ladue Horton Watkins High School and took classes at the Academy of Science, St. Louis, Washington University in St. Louis, and the Saint Louis Zoo. Burgess earned his bachelor's degree and a literary award at Purdue University; he received a PhD in Zoology at North Carolina State University, and an M.D. from the University of Miami School of Medicine. Burgess completed medical internship, psychiatry residency, and chief residency at Stanford University Medical Center, winning the Northern California Psychiatric Society Research Award.

== Career ==
Burgess studied social behavior with Peter Witt under a National Science Foundation grant at the North Carolina Department of Health and Human Services, and with Evelyn Shaw at the Stanford University Department of Biology. Burgess was then awarded a National Science Foundation research grant at the University of California, Davis where he did neuropsychology research and taught courses in the Department of Psychology. He accepted a National Science Foundation research fellowship with Jaime Villablanca to study brain and behavior and teach classes at the Semel Institute for Neuroscience and Human Behavior at the UCLA School of Medicine. During his residency, he led a suicide crisis hotline and student psychotherapy groups, and taught classes at Stanford University. Burgess maintained a private medical practice in adult and adolescent neuropsychiatry for over 20 years in Brentwood, Los Angeles, specializing in mood disorders and personality disorders. He was a consultant for the State Bar of California and the Los Angeles Superior Court, and he has been a guest on National Public Radio, television, and films. Burgess now devotes his time to writing and private consultation in Half Moon Bay, California, where he teaches at the Fitzgerald Marine Reserve.

== Scientific contributions ==
Burgess was the first United States scientist to discover social spiders, which he described in Scientific American and other journals. Social spiders challenge theories of social biology because spiders are usually cannibalistic and would not be expected to form social groups. Burgess showed how social spiders modify their environment to be able to live together. For example, Mexican spiders called Mallos gregalis spin a web that amplifies the sounds of the flies that they eat and dampens the vibrations made by other spiders, allowing Mallos spiders to live in colonies containing hundreds of thousands of individuals. Another spider called Metepeira spinipes, spins two-part spider webs: individual orbs to catch prey, and vibration-damping tangled webs where spiders coexist peacefully. Burgess also described Oecobius civitas spiders who exchange individual webs with each other as part of a unique prober/retaliator social strategy (see evolutionary game theory).

Burgess compared the biological forces that produce social groups in shoaling and schooling fish, flocking and territorial birds, monkey colonies, and human social groups; developing techniques of pattern recognition for measuring and displaying proxemic distances between k-nearest neighbor individuals in a social group.

Burgess found similar subgrouping patterns in rhesus monkey colonies in Puerto Rico, while working at the North Carolina Department of Mental Health Research. These patterns change if only a few members receive psychoactive drugs.

Burgess’ studies revealed how the dendrites of brain neurons grow during development. Together with Richard Coss at the University of California, Davis, Burgess was the first to show that sensory stimuli, including social stressors, can cause long-lasting changes in brain cell anatomical structure in just a few minutes. Together with Jaime Villablanca at UCLA, Burgess discovered that early brain injury resembling childhood congenital disorders and adult traumatic brain injury can heal naturally and that rehabilitative exercise improves brain healing. He helped clarify the rôle of the caudate nucleus in aggression and found that, without input from this nucleus, usually aggressive cats are friendly and affiliative. Burgess also contributed to our understanding of how the nervous system responds to morphine, especially during early development.

== Medical contributions ==
As a psychiatrist and medical doctor, Burgess studied mental illnesses that impair social relations. He created mental health tests, including verbal and written Mental Health Diagnostic Examinations, verbal and written Cognitive Function Examinations, the Card Test Cognitive Function Examination, and the Personality Inventory Scale for diagnoses of personality disorders. He showed that the pathology of borderline personality disorder, including chronic depression and self harm, is linked to impaired neurocognition—the ability to perform normal thought processes.

He has written books for individuals with bipolar disorder and major depressive disorder, their caretakers, and their families; as well as books and clinical articles on DSM-5 and ICD-10 diagnosis, cognitive testing, and psychotherapy and psychopharmacology treatments for use by health professionals.

== Publications ==
- Burgess, Wes. The Mental Status Examination. 2nd Edition. Volume 1 of the Mental Status Examination Series. CreateSpace; 2013. https://www.amazon.com/Mental-Status-Examination-Challenging-Questionnaires/dp/1482552957/ref=sr_1_3?s=books&ie=UTF8&qid=1374510374&sr=1-3&keywords=wes+burgess
- Burgess, Wes. The Mental Status Examination for Personality Disorders. Volume 2 of the Mental Status Examination Series. CreateSpace; 2013. Mental Status Examination for Personality Disorders. 32 Challenging Cases, DSM-5 and ICD-10 Model Interviews, Questionnaires and Cognitive Tests for Diagnosis and Treatment
- Burgess, Wes. Calm Your Mind: Exercises to Reduce Stress, Improve Focus, and Control Anxiety, Anger, and Depression. CreateSpace; 2011. Calm Your Mind: Exercises to Reduce Stress, Improve Focus, and Control Anxiety, Anger, and Depression
- Burgess, Wes. Transtorno Bipolar. Perguntas da Vida Real com Prespostas Atualizadas. São Paulo, Brazil: Editora Gaia; 2010. (Portuguese) Arte Pau Brasil – Tudo sobre o Brasil para você ficar por dentro
- Burgess, Wes. The Depression Answer Book. Sourcebooks; 2009. https://www.amazon.com/Depression-Answer-Book-Professional-Medication/dp/1402217129/ref=sr_1_6?s=books&ie=UTF8&qid=1365258978&sr=1-6&keywords=wes+burgess
- Burgess, Wes. The Bipolar Handbook for Children, Teens and Families. Avery/Penguin Press; 2008. https://www.amazon.com/Bipolar-Handbook-Children-Teens-Families/dp/158333307X/ref=sr_1_4?s=books&ie=UTF8&qid=1365258978&sr=1-4&keywords=wes+burgess
- Burgess, Wes. Guia del Bipolar. Barcelona, Spain: Ediciones Robinbook; 2007. (Spanish) https://www.amazon.com/Guia-del-bipolar-Preguntas-respuestas/dp/8499170900/ref=sr_1_9?s=books&ie=UTF8&qid=1365452485&sr=1-9&keywords=wes+burgess
- Burgess, Wes. The Bipolar Handbook. Avery/Penguin Press; 2006. https://www.amazon.com/Bipolar-Handbook-Real-Life-Up---Date/dp/1583332499/ref=sr_1_1?s=books&ie=UTF8&qid=1365258978&sr=1-1&keywords=wes+burgess
- Burgess, Wes. The Tao Te Ching by Lao Tse. Traditional Taoist Wisdom to Enlighten Everyone. Volume 1 of the Clear Mind Series. CreateSpace; 2012. https://www.amazon.com/Tao-Ching-Lao-Tse-Traditional/dp/1478361301/ref=sr_1_1?s=books&ie=UTF8&qid=1366150327&sr=1-1&keywords=wes+burgess+tao+te+ching
- Burgess, Wes. The Gateless Gate of Zen. Traditional Wisdom, Koans, and Stories to Enlighten Everyone. Volume 2 of The Clear Mind Series. CreateSpace; 2012. The Gateless Gate of Zen. Traditional Wisdom, Koans & Stories to Enlighten Everyone
- Burgess, Wes. The Tao Te Ching by Lao Tse. Mini Edition. CreateSpace; 2012. https://www.amazon.com/Tao-Ching-Lao-Tse-Mini/dp/1478372613/ref=sr_1_1?s=books&ie=UTF8&qid=1366150525&sr=1-1&keywords=wes+burgess+tao+te+ching+mini+edition
- Burgess, Wes. The Gateless Gate of Zen. Mini Edition. CreateSpace; 2012. https://www.amazon.com/Gateless-Gate-Zen-Mini/dp/1478373075/ref=sr_1_1?s=books&ie=UTF8&qid=1365453055&sr=1-1&keywords=gateless+gate+mini+edition
- Burgess, Wes. Be Enlightened! A Guidebook to the Tao Te Ching and Taoist Meditation. CreateSpace; 2010. https://www.amazon.com/Enlightened-Guidebook-Ching-Taoist-Meditation/dp/1451562896/ref=sr_1_10?s=books&ie=UTF8&qid=1365520622&sr=1-10&keywords=wes+burgess
- Burgess, Wes. The Ultimate Snorkeling Book. CreateSpace; 2010. https://www.amazon.com/Ultimate-Snorkeling-Book-Wes-Burgess/dp/145154443X/ref=sr_1_7?s=books&ie=UTF8&qid=1365258978&sr=1-7&keywords=wes+burgess
