= Anelosimus eidur =

Scientific classification
- Kingdom: Animalia
- Phylum: Arthropoda
- Subphylum: Chelicerata
- Class: Arachnida
- Order: Araneae
- Infraorder: Araneomorphae
- Family: Theridiidae
- Genus: Anelosimus
- Species: A. eidur

Binomial name
- Anelosimus eidur Agnarsson, 2012

Species of spider

Anelosimus eidur is a species of tangle-web spider found in Papua New Guinea. Its habitat is high elevation scrub forest, in Southern Highlands Province and Enga Province. It has a total length of 2.75 to 4 millimetres (0.108 to 0.157 in), with the females being larger than the males. It can be identified by its unique genitalia, particularly the spiraling embolus in the males. The web structure is similar to social and sub-social species, leading to its tentative identification as subsocial. The species is named Eiður Francis, the son of Ingi Agnarsson who first identified the species in 2012.
