= Anelosimus bali =

Scientific classification
- Kingdom: Animalia
- Phylum: Arthropoda
- Subphylum: Chelicerata
- Class: Arachnida
- Order: Araneae
- Infraorder: Araneomorphae
- Family: Theridiidae
- Genus: Anelosimus
- Species: A. bali

Binomial name
- Anelosimus bali Agnarsson, 2012

Species of spider

Anelosimus bali is a species of spider found in Bali, Indonesia, after which the species is named. It is a coastal species, found in small-leaved mangrove trees along the beach. The holotype is female and 2.9 millimetres (0.11 in) long. No male specimens have been identified, and the social structure of the species is not known. It was first identified in 2012 by Ingi Agnarsson.
