= Anelosimus elegans =

Scientific classification
- Kingdom: Animalia
- Phylum: Arthropoda
- Subphylum: Chelicerata
- Class: Arachnida
- Order: Araneae
- Infraorder: Araneomorphae
- Family: Theridiidae
- Genus: Anelosimus
- Species: A. elegans

Binomial name
- Anelosimus elegans Agnarsson, 2006

Species of spider

Anelosimus elegans is a species of cobweb spiders (Theridiidae). It is found from Mexico to Peru.
