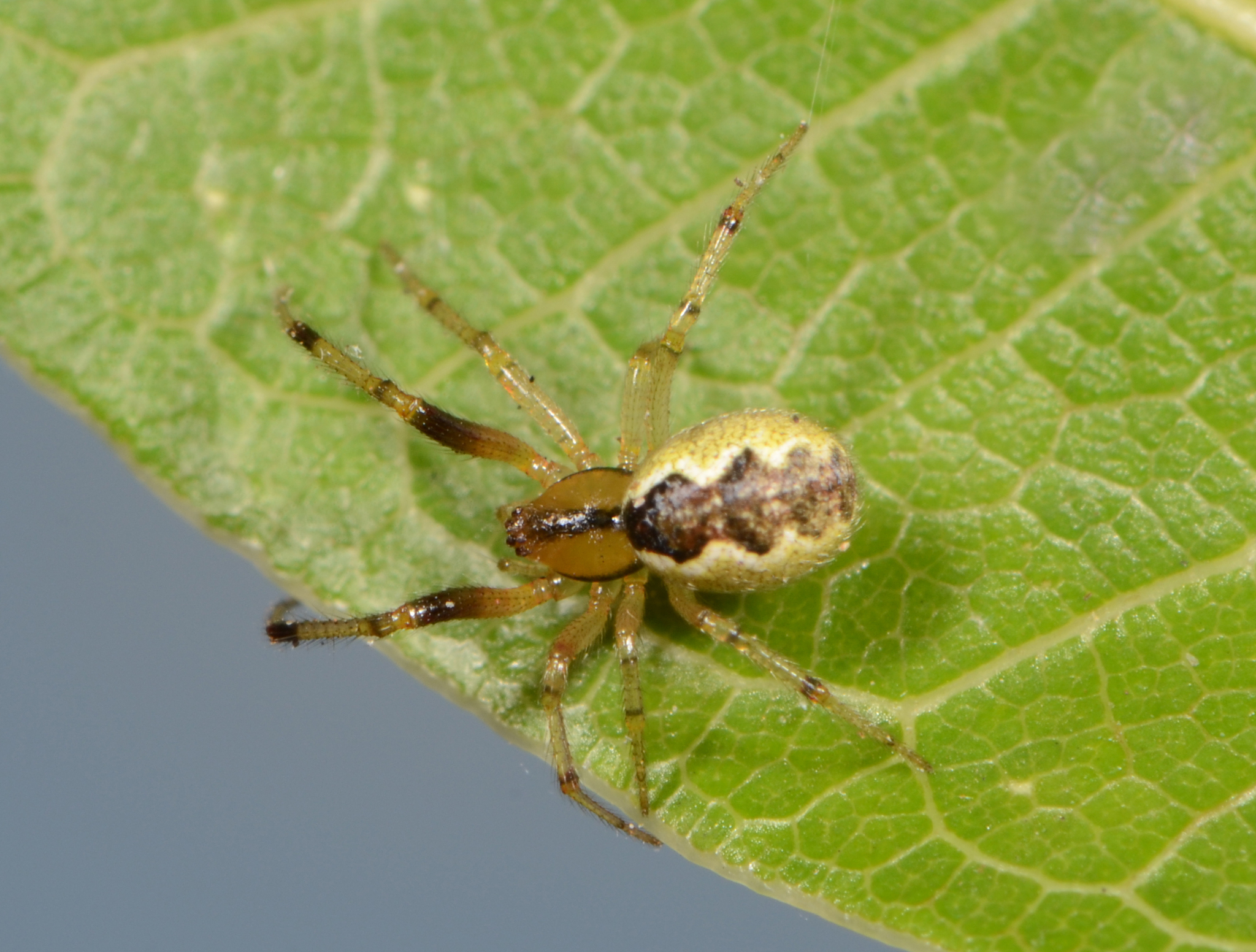
- Female
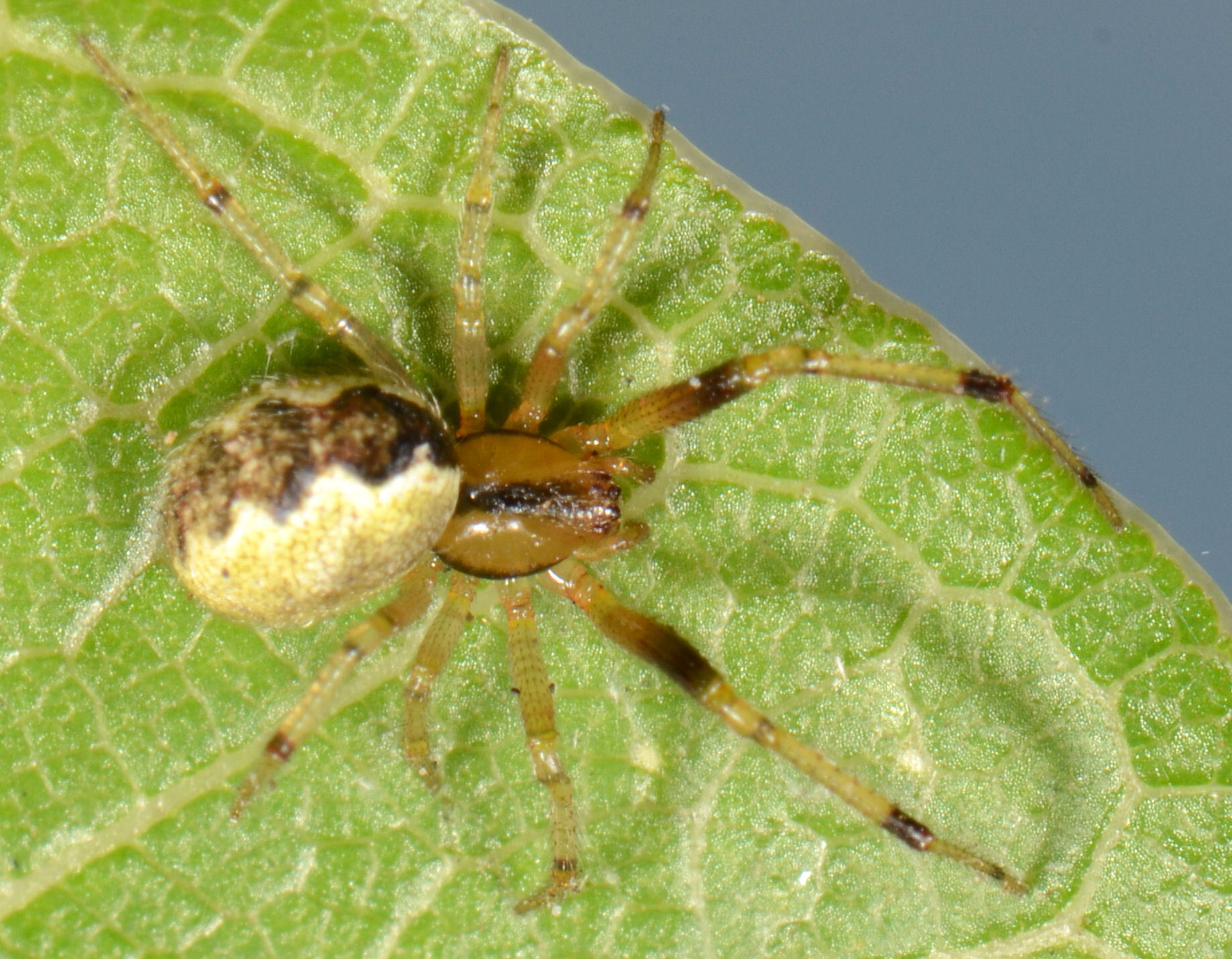
- Female

Scientific classification
- Kingdom: Animalia
- Phylum: Arthropoda
- Subphylum: Chelicerata
- Class: Arachnida
- Order: Araneae
- Infraorder: Araneomorphae
- Family: Theridiidae
- Genus: Anelosimus
- Species: A. nelsoni

Binomial name
- Anelosimus nelsoni Agnarsson, 2006

Synonyms
- Anelosimus nelson Dippenaar-Schoeman et al., 2021

= Anelosimus nelsoni =

Nelson's Anelosimus Comb-Foot Spider

Spider from South Africa named after Nelson Mandela

Anelosimus nelsoni is a species of spider in the family Theridiidae. It was first described from iSimangaliso Wetland Park, KwaZulu-Natal, South Africa. The species is named after Nelson Mandela.

== Distribution ==
Anelosimus nelsoni is found in South Africa, where it is known from the provinces Eastern Cape, Free State, Gauteng, KwaZulu-Natal, Limpopo, Mpumalanga, North West, and Western Cape.

== Description ==
The male holotype specimen is 2.08 millimetres (0.082 in) in length, and the female paratype is 2.60 millimetres (0.102 in) in length. Both the holotype and paratype were found on Fanies Island, 5 km south of Cape Vidal. Both were collected from bushes or trees in an open forest patch.

== Habitat and ecology ==
This web-dwelling species was collected by beating bushes and trees from the Fynbos, Indian Ocean Coastal Belt, Forest, Grassland, Savanna, and Thicket biomes. The species was also sampled from citrus orchards.

Anelosimus nelsoni has been sampled at altitudes ranging from 4 to 1556 m.

== Conservation ==
Anelosimus nelsoni is listed as Least Concern by the South African National Biodiversity Institute due to its wide geographical range. There are no significant threats to this species. It is protected in more than ten protected areas.

== See also ==
- Stasimopus mandelai, another spider named after Nelson Mandela
- List of organisms named after famous people (born 1900–1924)
