= Anelosimus linda =

Scientific classification
- Kingdom: Animalia
- Phylum: Arthropoda
- Subphylum: Chelicerata
- Class: Arachnida
- Order: Araneae
- Infraorder: Araneomorphae
- Family: Theridiidae
- Genus: Anelosimus
- Species: A. linda

Binomial name
- Anelosimus linda Agnarsson, 2006

Species of spider

Anelosimus linda is a species of spider in the family Theridiidae. The holotype and paratype specimens were collected in Cameron Highlands, Pahang, Malaysia. Both specimens are female; this species currently lack information on males. The spider is named for Linda Wendel, the mother of the discoverer, Ingi Agnarsson. Females are approximately 1.90 millimetres (0.075 in). A. linda lives in mid-elevation forest; both the holotype and paratype were collected at 1550m elevation.
