= Anelosimus sulawesi =

Scientific classification
- Kingdom: Animalia
- Phylum: Arthropoda
- Subphylum: Chelicerata
- Class: Arachnida
- Order: Araneae
- Infraorder: Araneomorphae
- Family: Theridiidae
- Genus: Anelosimus
- Species: A. sulawesi

Binomial name
- Anelosimus sulawesi Agnarsson, 2006

Species of spider

Anelosimus sulawesi is a small species of spiders in the family Theridiidae. It is known only from Dumoga Bone National Park, Sulawesi, Indonesia. The name derives from the location it was discovered. The holotype male is 2.00 millimetres (0.079 in) total length, while a female of the same species was measured to be 2.05 millimetres (0.081 in). The coloration is brown with some white on the dorsal folium, similar to other species in Anelosimus.
