= Anelosimus kohi =

Scientific classification
- Kingdom: Animalia
- Phylum: Arthropoda
- Subphylum: Chelicerata
- Class: Arachnida
- Order: Araneae
- Infraorder: Araneomorphae
- Family: Theridiidae
- Genus: Anelosimus
- Species: A. kohi

Binomial name
- Anelosimus kohi Yoshida, 1993

Species of spider

Anelosimus kohi is a species of spider in the family Theridiidae. It is found in Singapore and Malaysia. The species is named for Joseph K. H. Koh, an entomologist from Singapore who collected the holotype specimen.

== Description ==
Males are from 2.40 to 3.40 millimetres (0.094 to 0.134 in) long, while females are 3.70 to 4.40 millimetres (0.146 to 0.173 in) long. There are two coloration patterns found in this species, one uniformly reddish brown abdomen with a dark brown dorsal folium and the other grey abdomen bordered by a bright yellow band and a red dorsal folium. The holotype has the latter coloration pattern.

This species is also noted for a highly variable genitalia, although differences do not appear to vary by collection site or coloration pattern. The continuous range of variation, together with genetic data, has led to all specimens being combined in one species.

== Habitat ==
Anelosimus kohi builds basket webs in trees, generally at the tips of the branches. It inhabits trees close to beaches. Nests appear to consist of a single female spider and sub-adult offspring. The spider appears to be sub-social.
