= Anelosimus pomio =

Scientific classification
- Kingdom: Animalia
- Phylum: Arthropoda
- Subphylum: Chelicerata
- Class: Arachnida
- Order: Araneae
- Infraorder: Araneomorphae
- Family: Theridiidae
- Genus: Anelosimus
- Species: A. pomio

Binomial name
- Anelosimus pomio Agnarsson, 2012

Species of spider

Anelosimus pomio is a species of tangle-web spider found in Papua New Guinea. It was first collected in 2009 by Ingi Agnarsson, and identified by the same in 2012. It was collected from small-leaved mangrove trees adjoining a beach. It is 3 to 4 millimetres (0.12 to 0.16 in) in length, and can be distinguished from other species in its genus by the shape of the embolus. The embolus looks similar to that of Anelosimus chonganicus and Anelosimus membranaceus: It forms a corkscrew shape with fewer turns than A. chongnicus and the turns are closer to the base than A. membranaceus. It is presumed to be a solitary spider, although there are limited data. Its name is derived from the village of Pomio, in East New Britain Province, near where it was collected.
