= Anelosimus buffoni =

Scientific classification
- Kingdom: Animalia
- Phylum: Arthropoda
- Subphylum: Chelicerata
- Class: Arachnida
- Order: Araneae
- Infraorder: Araneomorphae
- Family: Theridiidae
- Genus: Anelosimus
- Species: A. buffoni

Binomial name
- Anelosimus buffoni Agnarsson, Kuntner & Jencik, 2015

Species of spider

Anelosimus buffoni is a species of tangle-web spiders in the Madagascar group of the genus Anelosimus. It is known only from Périnet Special Reserve, Toamasina Province, Madagascar. Adults of the species have a total length of 4.1mm, and is physically similar to several other Madagascar group spiders, particularly A. andasibe and A. wallacei. It is primarily diagnosed using genetics. The species is named for Georges-Louis Leclerc, Comte de Buffon.

== Specimens ==
There are only two specimens of this spider in existing collections. Although multiple specimens were reported to have been collected, only two exist in collections; the rest were reported lost in transit when the co-discoverer, Ingi Agnarsson, brought his research materials from University of Puerto Rico to University of Vermont. The two specimens which remain were partially destroyed for DNA barcoding.
