= Stasimopus mandelai =

Mandela's Cork-Lid Trapdoor Spider

Conservation status
- Critically endangered (SANBI Red List)

Scientific classification
- Kingdom: Animalia
- Phylum: Arthropoda
- Subphylum: Chelicerata
- Class: Arachnida
- Order: Araneae
- Infraorder: Mygalomorphae
- Family: Stasimopidae
- Genus: Stasimopus
- Species: S. mandelai

Binomial name
- Stasimopus mandelai Hendrixson & Bond, 2004

Spider from South Africa named after Nelson Mandela

Stasimopus mandelai is a species of spider in the family Stasimopidae from the Eastern Cape Province of South Africa. This species occurs syntopically with S. schoenlandi and a number of other mygalomorph spiders at the Great Fish River Nature Reserve. The species was named in 2004 by zoologists Brent Hendrixson and Jason Bond "honoring Nelson Mandela, the former president of South Africa and one of the great moral leaders of our time."

== Distribution ==
Stasimopus mandelai is endemic to the Eastern Cape province of South Africa. It is known only from the type locality at Great Fish River Nature Reserve at an altitude of 323 m above sea level.

== Habitat and ecology ==
The species inhabits the Thicket biome. Stasimopus mandelai is a ground dweller that constructs silk-lined burrows closed with a cork-lid trapdoor. A few specimens were sampled from the type locality, including one female with 35 second instar spiderlings.

== Conservation ==
Stasimopus mandelai is listed as Critically Rare. The species has a very restricted distribution range. It is known only from one protected subpopulation. More sampling is needed to determine the full range of the species.

== Taxonomy ==
The species was originally described by Hendrixson & Bond in 2004 from the Great Fish River Nature Reserve. It is known from both sexes.

== See also ==
- Anelosimus nelsoni
- List of organisms named after famous people (born 1900–1924)
