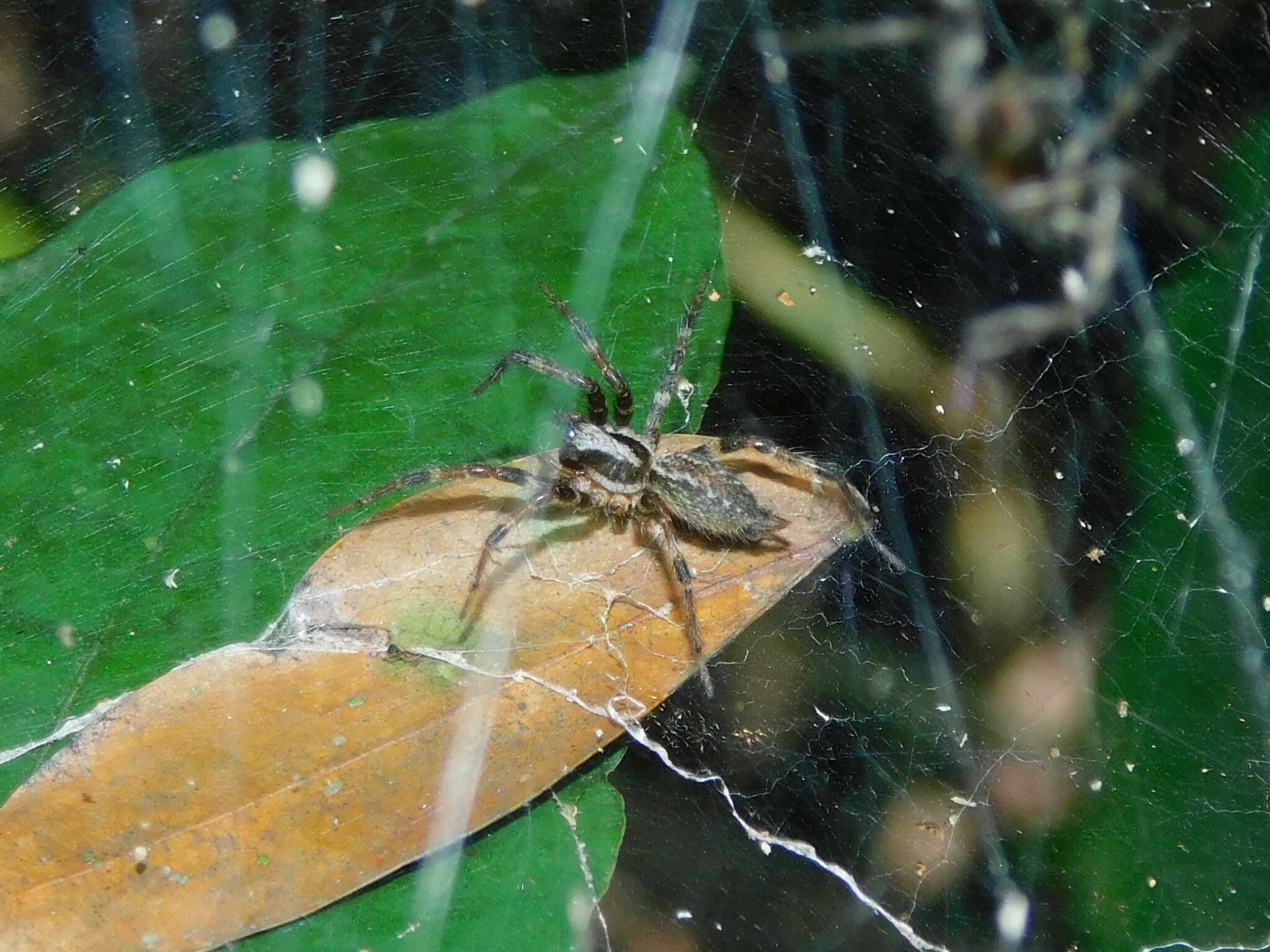
- An individual in Bugoma Forest, Western Uganda.

Scientific classification
- Kingdom: Animalia
- Phylum: Arthropoda
- Subphylum: Chelicerata
- Class: Arachnida
- Order: Araneae
- Infraorder: Araneomorphae
- Family: Agelenidae
- Genus: Agelena
- Species: A. consociata

Binomial name
- Agelena consociata Denis, 1965

= Agelena consociata =

Species of spider

Agelena consociata is a social species of funnel web spider that occurs in tropical forests in West Africa and lives in colonies of one to several hundred individuals. This species is found in rainforest habitats in Gabon. It favors dense forests along creeks where colonies can build huge complex webs.

== Description ==
Male and female spiders are similar in size but there are fewer males than females. This spider is a dull brown colour with two broad lateral grey stripes. The legs are banded in brown and black. Both body and legs are covered with short hairs.

== Sociality ==
Most spider species are highly competitive and territorial, so observing sociality in certain species is rare. Because of this, it can often provide insight into the evolution of sociality. It has been proposed that sociality evolved from a subsocial spider species through the acquisition of three main behavioral traits: postmating dispersal, inbreeding, and cooperative care of offspring.

Spiders that live in groups can be divided into two main categories, colonial and cooperative, each showing reduced characteristics of solitary behavior. Colonial spiders still express some competition and are usually limited to the tolerance of their neighbors, while cooperative spiders exhibit group prey capture, feeding, and web maintenance. In A. consociata, nests are built by binding silk to branches and leaves in the surrounding area. Their nests are rarely built on the ground. They share nests and webs that consist of horizontal sheets with vertical scaffoldings, which serve as traps for capturing prey.

These spiders exhibit different levels of cooperation during the capture of prey. One to a few individuals may attack small prey, while the capture of large prey may involve over 25 individuals. Once captured, they are transported to a retreat where up to 40 spiders have been observed feeding on a single large prey. Also, cooperation has been observed during regurgitation of digested food from parent to offspring.

Sociality is beneficial in A. consociata in several ways. Living in groups reduces the energy spent building traps per individual, so nests and traps tend to be larger in size. Capturing of prey is also less costly in groups. Researchers found that nests containing a small number of individuals became extinct more often than nests containing a larger number of individuals due to the quality of nests. Finally, survival of genes is more likely due to genetic similarities within nests.

== Ecology ==
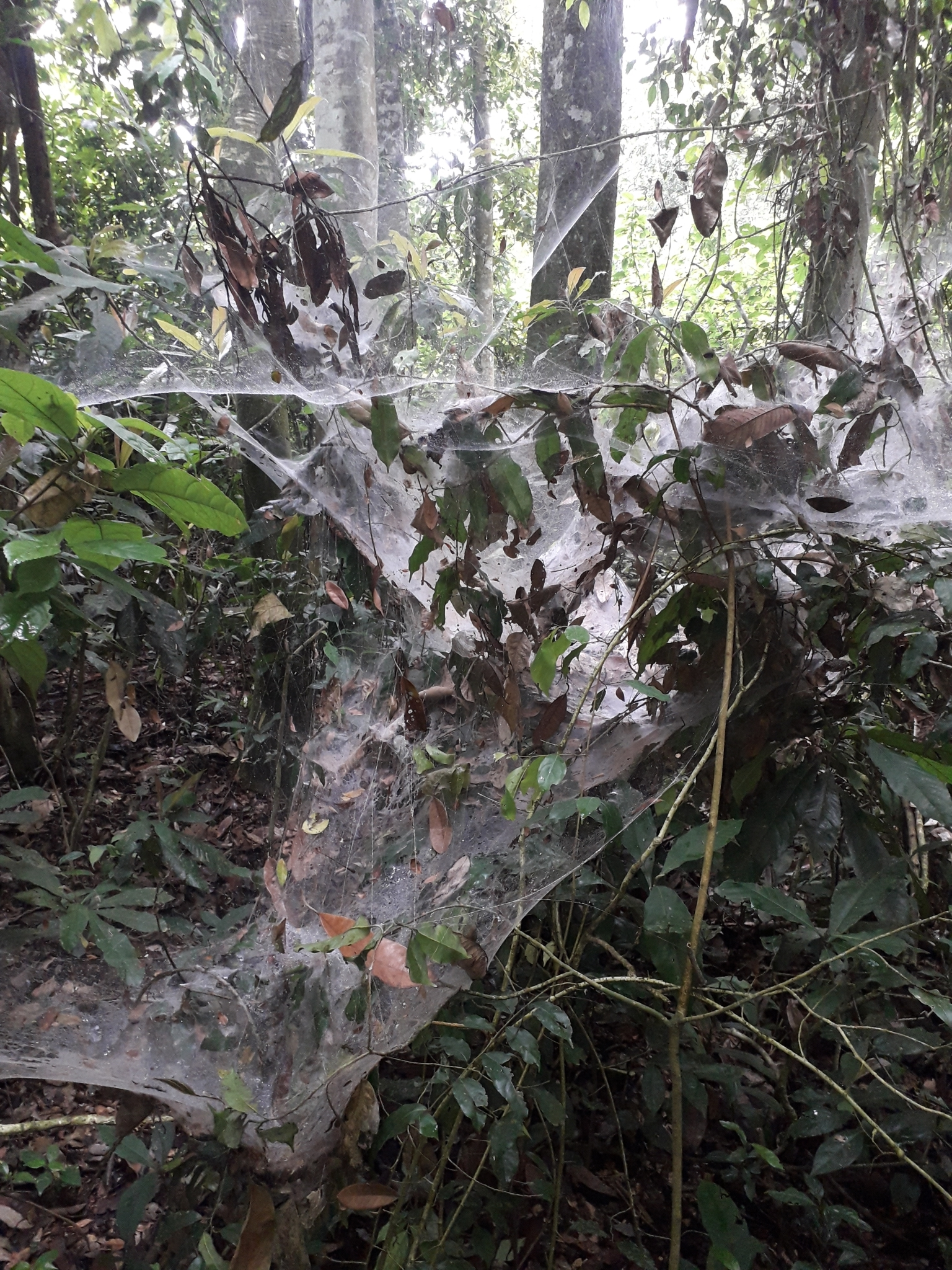
A collective web in Uganda

A. consociata live in groups ranging from a few individuals to thousands per colony. They live in large webs, and they commonly cooperate in the capture of prey and in their maintenance. The web structure consists of individual nests connected by flat sheets of silk supported by vertical scaffolding threads. There are a number of retreat holes leading into the nests and groups of nests are often joined by more sheets of webbing and scaffolding.

Although these spiders live in colonies consisting of many individuals, each spider acts and breeds individually and there is not any specialization of role as there is with social insects. The spiders cooperate in the maintenance of the web and the catching of large prey. As many as forty spiders have been seen feeding on one victim and adults often regurgitate to feed juveniles that are not their own offspring. In fact there is considerable tolerance of the young which continues into adulthood in a way that is not seen in non-social spiders. When spiders are introduced into a colony from elsewhere, they are accepted; it is the species that matters, not the origin. This again is in contrast to social insects which defend their nests against outsiders. The spiders communicate through the use of pheromones and also through the vibrations of the web structure.

A new colony can be started by a single female spider, a group of immatures or by a group of adults and juveniles. Eggs are laid at times of high humidity and there are a large number of cocoons between November and January.

Sociality in spiders is rare, so cooperativity among them has been studied in order to determine its basis. There are two main hypotheses for the evolution of social behavior: kin selection and group selection. Kin selection, selection favoring the individual and other related individuals because of cooperative behavior, and group selection, selection on traits that are advantageous to groups but not individuals, have been proposed as reasons for cooperativity.

Kin selection requires genetic relatedness between individuals while group selection does not, so in order to distinguish between the two, relatedness between spiders in nests has been determined. The genetic structure within nests shows that individuals are highly similar and are related as much as full-siblings. Genetic structure of spiders in different nests, however, showed that genetic diversity is high even if the nests are not a far distance away. On examination of the genetic makeup of the colony, it was found that colonies separated by thirty meters were likely to be as genetically distinct as colonies separated by many kilometers. Because of the high genetic similarities within nests, inbreeding is likely to occur.

The spiders’ lack of dispersion also suggests that sociality and inbreeding occur. Dispersion often influences sociality, as it can often determine whether or not a spider lives in groups. Dispersion is usually accidental in A. consociata and is only successful when many individuals participate. When only a few individuals attempt to disperse, they are frequently subjects of predation. While voluntary dispersion may not often occur, animal dispersion occasionally does, as dispersion over large distances is likely to be passive transport by bats or other vertebrates. Passive animal dispersion may occur often enough that selection has not favored active dispersion. Limited dispersion, however, can be consequential. The spider could be more susceptible to a single parasite or a natural disaster since they are all genetically similar and remain in one colony. Their lack of dispersion, heterogeneity, and relatedness all suggest that kin selection plays a major role in the cooperativity of individuals.

The web structure may appear empty during the day because the spiders lie hidden, emerging at nightfall to repair the web and hunt. Most of the prey is caught at night.

It is thought that this species may have developed colonial behaviour because of the difficulty of dispersal in the rainforest environment. Other reasons might be the individual cost of repeatedly repairing a web frequently damaged by tropical downpours and particularly, because of the continuity of generations that occurs, a thing that is not possible in cooler climates.
