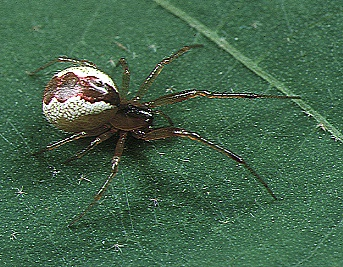
- Female A. crassipes from Japan
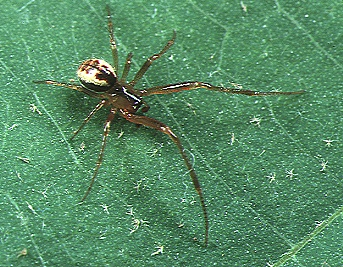
- Male A. crassipes

Scientific classification
- Kingdom: Animalia
- Phylum: Arthropoda
- Subphylum: Chelicerata
- Class: Arachnida
- Order: Araneae
- Infraorder: Araneomorphae
- Family: Theridiidae
- Genus: Anelosimus; Simon, 1891

Species
- 75, see text.

Synonyms
- Seycellocesa Koçak & Kemal, 2008; Saaristoa Koçak & Kemal, 2008 (replacement name); Selimus Saaristo, 2006 (replacement name)

= Anelosimus =

Genus of spiders

Anelosimus is a cosmopolitan genus of cobweb spiders (Theridiidae), currently containing 74 species. Anelosimus is a key group in the study of sociality and its evolution in spiders (Aviles 1997). It contains species spanning the spectrum from solitary to highly social (quasisocial), with eight quasisocial species, far more than any other spider genus. Among these is the South American social species Anelosimus eximius, among the best studied social spider species.

The web of a colony of A. eximius can reach cover entire tree canopies and contain tens of thousands of individuals. Most of the highly social species live in lowland tropical forests, and all occur in the Americas. Other species, particularly those at higher altitudes in northern latitudes in the Americas and all non-American species appear to be solitary or sub-social. Social Anelosimus species are generally highly inbred and have female-biased sex ratios, with up to 10 females per male.

The social, subsocial, and solitary behavior of differing species within Anelosimus has been used to examine hypotheses of environmental pressures on social behavior, and inbreeding. Subsociality as a trait seems to be conserved, despite the wide range of environments in which Anelosimus species live; all known solitary species within the genus belong to a single clade. Sociality, however, has independently arisen several times.

== Description ==
Anelosimus spiders have a notched red or brown band on their abdomen, which is dark when preserved in alcohol. Laterally, the abdomen has a white band and/or white blotches. Specimens range in size from 1.8 to 7.5 millimetres (0.071 to 0.295 in). Individuals in this genus lack a colulus.

== Species ==
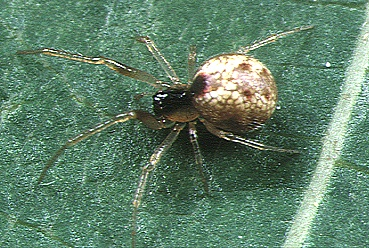
Female A. exiguus

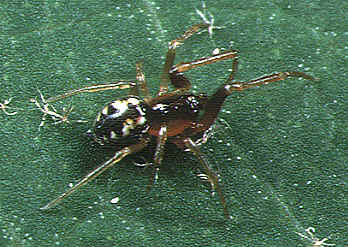
Male A. exiguus

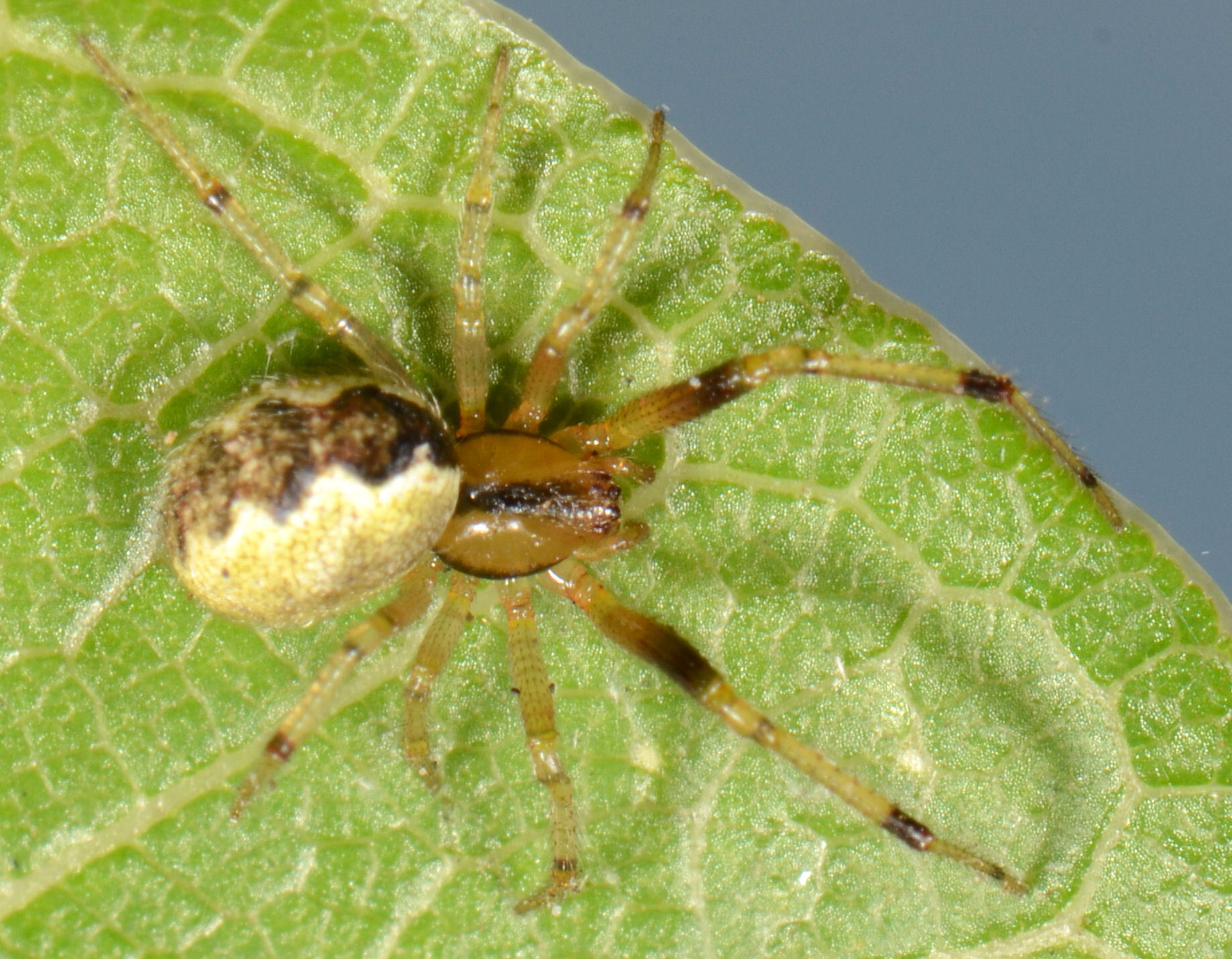
Female A. nelsoni

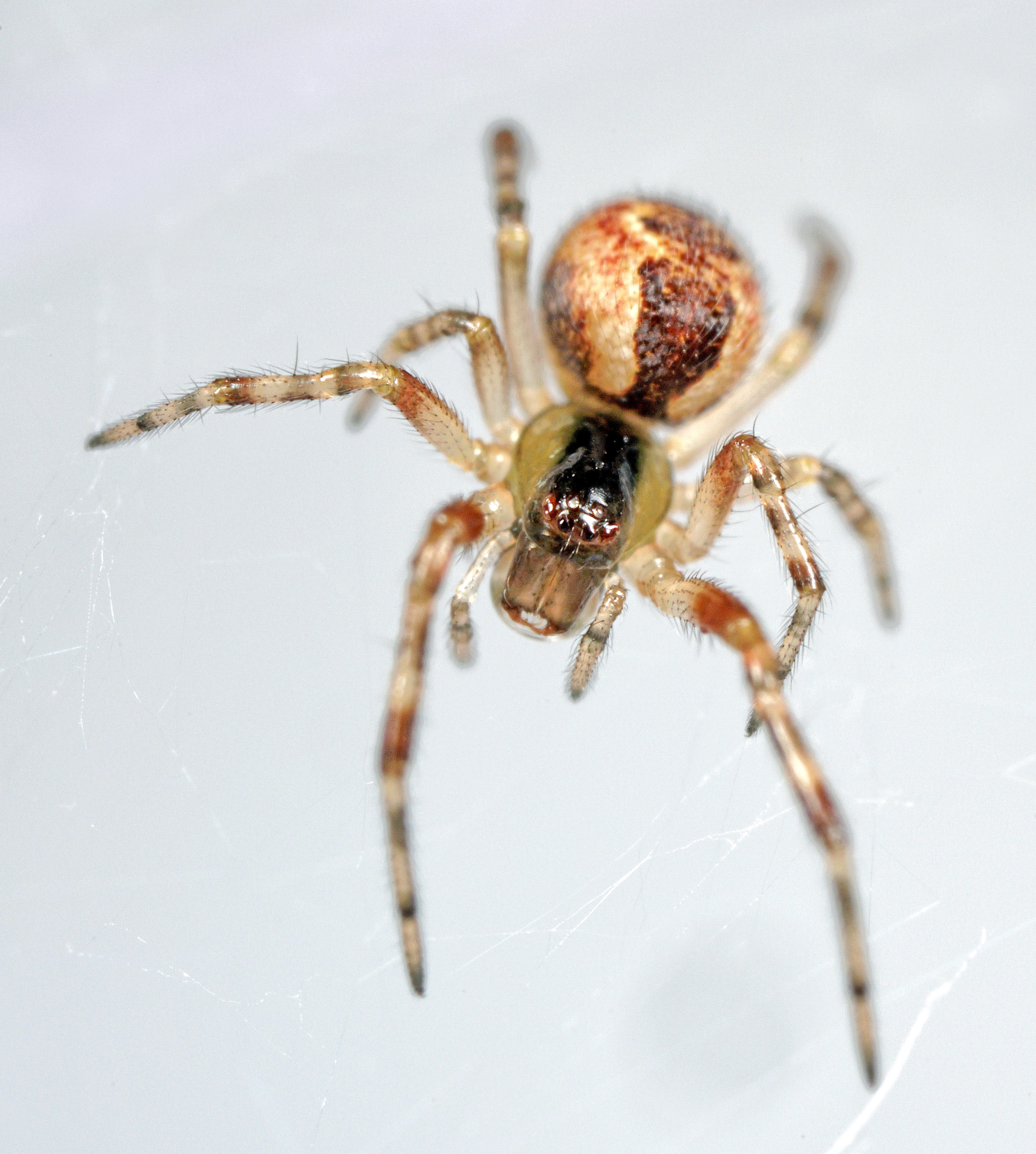
A. vittatus

As of October 2025, this genus includes 75 species:

- Anelosimus agnar Agnarsson, 2006 – Malaysia
- Anelosimus amelie Agnarsson, 2009 – Comoros, Mayotte
- Anelosimus analyticus (Chamberlin, 1924) – United States, Mexico
- Anelosimus andasibe Agnarsson & Kuntner, 2005 – Madagascar
- Anelosimus arizona Agnarsson, 2006 – United States, Mexico
- Anelosimus ata Agnarsson, Kuntner & Jencik, 2015 – Madagascar
- Anelosimus baeza Agnarsson, 2006 – Mexico to Brazil
- Anelosimus bali Agnarsson, 2012 – Bali
- Anelosimus biglebowski Agnarsson, 2006 – Tanzania
- Anelosimus buffoni Agnarsson, Kuntner & Jencik, 2015 – Madagascar
- Anelosimus chickeringi Levi, 1956 – Mexico to Peru
- Anelosimus chonganicus Zhu, 1998 – China
- Anelosimus crassipes (Bösenberg & Strand, 1906) – China, Korea, Japan
- Anelosimus darwini Agnarsson, Kuntner & Jencik, 2015 – Madagascar
- Anelosimus decaryi (Fage, 1930) – Seychelles (Aldabra), Madagascar, Comoros, Mayotte
- Anelosimus dialeucon (Simon, 1890) – Yemen
- Anelosimus dianiphus (Rainbow, 1916) – Australia (Queensland)
- Anelosimus domingo Levi, 1963 – Colombia to Suriname and Peru
- Anelosimus dubiosus (Keyserling, 1891) – Brazil
- Anelosimus dubius (Tullgren, 1910) – Tanzania
- Anelosimus dude Agnarsson, 2006 – Tanzania
- Anelosimus eidur Agnarsson, 2012 – New Guinea
- Anelosimus elegans Agnarsson, 2006 – Mexico to Peru
- Anelosimus ethicus (Keyserling, 1884) – Brazil
- Anelosimus exiguus Yoshida, 1986 – China, Japan, Ryukyu Is.
- Anelosimus eximius (Keyserling, 1884) – Lesser Antilles, Panama to Argentina (type species)
- Anelosimus fraternus Bryant, 1948 – Hispaniola
- Anelosimus guacamayos Agnarsson, 2006 – Ecuador
- Anelosimus hookeri Agnarsson, Kuntner & Jencik, 2015 – Madagascar
- Anelosimus huxleyi Agnarsson, Veve & Kuntner, 2015 – Madagascar
- Anelosimus inhandava Agnarsson, 2005 – Brazil, Argentina
- Anelosimus iwawakiensis Yoshida, 1986 – Korea, Japan
- Anelosimus jabaquara Levi, 1956 – Brazil
- Anelosimus jucundus (O. Pickard-Cambridge, 1896) – Mexico to Argentina
- Anelosimus kohi Yoshida, 1993 – Malaysia, Singapore
- Anelosimus lamarcki Agnarsson & Goh, 2015 – Madagascar
- Anelosimus linda Agnarsson, 2006 – Malaysia
- Anelosimus lorenzo Fowler & Levi, 1979 – Brazil, Paraguay, Uruguay, Argentina
- Anelosimus luckyi Agnarsson, 2012 – New Guinea
- Anelosimus may Agnarsson, 2005 – Madagascar
- Anelosimus membranaceus Zhang, Liu & Zhang, 2011 – China (Hainan)
- Anelosimus misiones Agnarsson, 2005 – Argentina
- Anelosimus monskenyensis Agnarsson, 2006 – Kenya
- Anelosimus moramora Agnarsson, Kuntner & Jencik, 2015 – Madagascar
- Anelosimus nazariani Agnarsson & Kuntner, 2005 – Madagascar
- Anelosimus nelsoni Agnarsson, 2006 – South Africa
- Anelosimus nigrescens (Keyserling, 1884) – Guyana, Brazil
- Anelosimus octavius Agnarsson, 2006 – Mexico to Costa Rica
- Anelosimus oritoyacu Agnarsson, 2006 – Mexico to Ecuador
- Anelosimus pacificus Levi, 1956 – Mexico to Costa Rica, Jamaica
- Anelosimus pantanal Agnarsson, 2006 – Brazil
- Anelosimus placens (Blackwall, 1877) – Seychelles
- Anelosimus pomio Agnarsson, 2012 – Papua New Guinea (New Britain)
- Anelosimus potmosbi Agnarsson, 2012 – New Guinea
- Anelosimus pratchetti Agnarsson, 2012 – Australia (New South Wales)
- Anelosimus pulchellus (Walckenaer, 1802) – Europe, Caucasus, Iran, North Africa
- Anelosimus puravida Agnarsson, 2006 – Guatemala to Panama
- Anelosimus rabus Levi, 1963 – Brazil
- Anelosimus rupununi Levi, 1956 – Trinidad to Brazil
- Anelosimus sallee Agnarsson & Kuntner, 2005 – Madagascar
- Anelosimus salut Agnarsson & Kuntner, 2005 – Madagascar
- Anelosimus seximaculatus (Zhu, 1998) – China (Hainan)
- Anelosimus studiosus (Hentz, 1850) – USA to Argentina
- Anelosimus subcrassipes Zhang, Liu & Zhang, 2011 – China (Hainan)
- Anelosimus sulawesi Agnarsson, 2006 – Indonesia (Sulawesi)
- Anelosimus sumisolena Agnarsson, 2005 – Brazil
- Anelosimus taiwanicus Yoshida, 1986 – Taiwan, Indonesia (Krakatau)
- Anelosimus terraincognita Agnarsson, 2012 – possibly Australasia
- Anelosimus tita Agnarsson, Kuntner & Jencik, 2015 – Madagascar
- Anelosimus torfi Agnarsson, 2015 – Madagascar
- Anelosimus tosus (Chamberlin, 1916) – Mexico to Peru
- Anelosimus vierae Agnarsson, 2012 – Uruguay, Argentina
- Anelosimus vittatus (C. L. Koch, 1836) – Europe, Turkey, Caucasus, Iran
- Anelosimus vondrona Agnarsson & Kuntner, 2005 – Madagascar
- Anelosimus wallacei Agnarsson, Veve & Kuntner, 2015 – Madagascar
