= Parasteatoda wau =

Scientific classification
- Kingdom: Animalia
- Phylum: Arthropoda
- Subphylum: Chelicerata
- Class: Arachnida
- Order: Araneae
- Infraorder: Araneomorphae
- Family: Theridiidae
- Genus: Parasteatoda
- Species: P. wau

Binomial name
- Parasteatoda wau (Levi, Lubin & Robinson, 1982)

Synonyms
- Achaearanea wau Levi, Lubin & Robinson, 1982

Species of spider

Parasteatoda wau (formerly Achaearanea wau) is a species of social spider that lives around Wau, Papua New Guinea. The spider exhibits a complex dispersal behavior akin to swarming in social bees. It was first described by Herbert Walter Levi, Yael Lubin, and M.H. Robinson in 1982 as Achaearanea wau, and transferred to the genus Parasteatoda in 2008.

== Colony structure ==
A P. wau colony consists of a flat, horizontal web, made of mesh silk, and a tangle of vertical silk strands forming a barrier. Insects fly into this barrier and fall to the mesh web, where the spiders capture them and feed on them.

Suspended in the vertical web are numerous curled leaves, which serve as communal retreats in which the spiders hide during inactivity throughout the day (the spiders carry out web construction and hunting at night time).

== Swarming behavior ==
After spiders in a P. wau colony mate, but before the females lay eggs, web construction activity will sharply increase as the spiders construct a straight highway of silk, about 1m wide and several meters long, away from their web. Once this web is constructed, a subset of the newly fertilized adult female spiders migrate along the highway en masse, forming a new colony, or colonies, at the end of the highway. The parent colony often still remains in place.
