= Phryganoporus =

Scientific classification
- Domain: Eukaryota
- Kingdom: Animalia
- Phylum: Arthropoda
- Subphylum: Chelicerata
- Class: Arachnida
- Order: Araneae
- Infraorder: Araneomorphae
- Family: Desidae
- Genus: Phryganoporus; Simon, 1908

Type species
- P. candidus (L. Koch, 1872)

Species
- 5, see text

Genus of spiders

Phryganoporus is a genus of Australian intertidal spiders that was first described by Eugène Simon in 1908. Its five species only occur in Australia and Tasmania, with one species also occurring on Norfolk Island, south of New Caledonia. The name is derived from Greek phryganon ("dry stick") and poros ("hole"), referring to the web that is often built on dry shrubs or low vegetation with a hole as an entrance.

Though they are typically solitary, P. candidus is also known for its communal behaviour, building "nests" made of branches and leaves knitted together with silk, creating tunnels for the spiders to live. Most of these webs are built late in the summer by individual females working separately in the construction and cleaning of their individual webs. Their behaviour is likely due to pheromone mediated sibling tolerance, and is not considered true cooperative behaviour. As they mature, they grow less tolerant of each other and tend to disperse over the course of the summer. In the Riverina area of New South Wales, these nests have caused foliage matting, leaf fall and withering of limbs in fruit trees.

== Species ==
As of May 2019 it contains five species:

- Phryganoporus candidus (L. Koch, 1872) (type) – Australia (mainland, Norfolk Is.)
- Phryganoporus davidleei Gray, 2002 – Australia (Western Australia, South Australia)
- Phryganoporus melanopygus Gray, 2002 – Australia (Western Australia)
- Phryganoporus nigrinus Simon, 1908 – Australia (Western Australia to Queensland)
- Phryganoporus vandiemeni (Gray, 1983) – Australia (Victoria, Tasmania)
