= Mallos gregalis =

Scientific classification
- Kingdom: Animalia
- Phylum: Arthropoda
- Subphylum: Chelicerata
- Class: Arachnida
- Order: Araneae
- Infraorder: Araneomorphae
- Family: Dictynidae
- Genus: Mallos
- Species: M. gregalis

Binomial name
- Mallos gregalis (Simon, 1909)

Synonyms
- Coenothele gregalis Simon, 1909

Species of spider

Mallos gregalis is a spider species belonging to the family Dictynidae. It is endemic to Mexico.

Discovered by French naturalists in the previous century, M. gregalis were again brought to light in the 1970s by Wes Burgess through his research on their social lifestyle. M. gregalis live in groups containing thousands of individuals together on a sheet-like spider web. Like other social spiders, the unique qualities of M. gregalis' web help make their social lifestyle possible. Their web preferentially transmits the vibrations of flies caught in the web while dampening out the vibrations caused by other spiders, thus allowing the M. gregalis spiders to distinguish between the prey and each other. The smell of previously eaten fly bodies helps attract other flies to M. gregalis′ web.
