= Anelosimus guacamayos =

Scientific classification
- Kingdom: Animalia
- Phylum: Arthropoda
- Subphylum: Chelicerata
- Class: Arachnida
- Order: Araneae
- Infraorder: Araneomorphae
- Family: Theridiidae
- Genus: Anelosimus
- Species: A. guacamayos

Binomial name
- Anelosimus guacamayos Agnarsson, 2006

Species of spider

Anelosimus guacamayos is a species of social cobweb spider that occurs in the lower Ecuadorian sierra. The live in large nests (1–2 meters in width), and are found in disturbed areas. Like rain forest cobweb spiders, they cooperate in the capture of prey and building of a communal nest.
