= Stasimopus schoenlandi =

Scientific classification
- Kingdom: Animalia
- Phylum: Arthropoda
- Subphylum: Chelicerata
- Class: Arachnida
- Order: Araneae
- Infraorder: Mygalomorphae
- Family: Stasimopidae
- Genus: Stasimopus
- Species: S. schoenlandi

Binomial name
- Stasimopus schoenlandi Pocock, 1900

Synonyms
- Stasimopus schönlandi Pocock, 1900; Stasimopus rufitarsis Strand, 1907 (provisional name)

Species of spider

Stasimopus schoenlandi is a species of spider in the family Stasimopidae from South Africa. This species occurs syntopically with S. mandelai and a number of other mygalomorph spiders at the Great Fish River Nature Reserve.

== Distribution ==
Stasimopus schoenlandi is endemic to South Africa. The species occurs in the Eastern Cape province at multiple localities including Grahamstown, Jansenville, Brak Kloof, Atherstone Station, Somerset East, Middledrift, Middleton, Kamacks road near Uitenhage, Port Elizabeth, and Debe Neck.

== Habitat and ecology ==
The species is a ground dweller that lives in silk-lined burrows closed with a cork-lid trapdoor. The species has been sampled from the Fynbos, Nama Karoo, Savanna and Thicket biomes at altitudes between 7-737 m above sea level.

== Conservation ==
Stasimopus schoenlandi is listed as Data Deficient by the South African National Biodiversity Institute. The species is known from several localities at altitudes of 7-737 m above sea level, but all were sampled prior to 1913. Threats to this species are unknown.

== Taxonomy ==
The species was originally described by Reginald Innes Pocock in 1900 from Middleton. The species has not been revised and is known from both sexes. The status of the species remains obscure and additional sampling is needed to determine the present species range.
