= Anelosimus analyticus =

Scientific classification
- Kingdom: Animalia
- Phylum: Arthropoda
- Subphylum: Chelicerata
- Class: Arachnida
- Order: Araneae
- Infraorder: Araneomorphae
- Family: Theridiidae
- Genus: Anelosimus
- Species: A. analyticus

Binomial name
- Anelosimus analyticus (Chamberlin, 1924)

Species of spider

Anelosimus analyticus is a species of cobweb spider in the family Theridiidae. It is found in the United States and Mexico.
