= Anelosimus luckyi =

Scientific classification
- Kingdom: Animalia
- Phylum: Arthropoda
- Subphylum: Chelicerata
- Class: Arachnida
- Order: Araneae
- Infraorder: Araneomorphae
- Family: Theridiidae
- Genus: Anelosimus
- Species: A. luckyi

Binomial name
- Anelosimus luckyi Agnarsson, 2012

Species of spider

Anelosimus luckyi is a species of spider found in Papua New Guinea. It is known only from the holotype specimen, found by Andrea Lucky in 2009 and after whom the species is named. It was discovered in Western Province at an elevation of 1,587 metres (5,207 ft). It has a distinctive embolus, which differentiates it from other species. The sociality of the species is not known.
