= Anelosimus jabaquara =

Scientific classification
- Kingdom: Animalia
- Phylum: Arthropoda
- Subphylum: Chelicerata
- Class: Arachnida
- Order: Araneae
- Infraorder: Araneomorphae
- Family: Theridiidae
- Genus: Anelosimus
- Species: A. jabaquara

Binomial name
- Anelosimus jabaquara Levi, 1956

Species of spider

Anelosimus jabaquara is a species of spider found in subtropical, humid, lowland forests in Brazil. Anelosimus jabaquara was first described by Herbert W. Levi in 1956. These spiders cooperate to spin and repair the colonial web, capture prey, and care for the brood. Colony size is small, and the sex ratio is biased towards females.

== Description ==
Adult males are on average smaller than adult females. The mean male cephalothorax length is 1.38 cm, while the mean female cephalothorax length is 1.62 cm. Similar to other Anelosimus species, Anelosimus jabaquara has a minute colulus, three teeth on the anterior margin of the chelicerae and denticles on the posterior. The palpus distinguishes this species from others. The eyes are subequal in size. For males, the carapace and sternum are orange-yellow. The legs are dusky yellow. The abdomen is dusky with dorsal and ventral black bands. For females, the carapace is red, except for black rings around the eyes. The clypeus, chelicerae, and endites are orange, and the sternum and labium are red. The legs are light brown with darker segments on the distal end. The tibiae and femora have dark rings in the middle. The abdomen is dark brown with a dorsal medium band containing black spots.

== Life cycle ==
Anelosimus jabaquara females have one brood per year, and develop through eight instars (stages). Males begin dying soon after copulation; males are not involved in brood care. Spiderlings go through their first instar while inside the egg sac. The spiderlings leave the egg sac in their second instar, however the protective behavior of the female remains. Females feed their spiderlings through regurgitation. This happens until the spiderlings reach the third instar, when they are then able to capture small prey on their own. During the fourth instar, the juveniles of one brood will mix with other broods, capturing prey together in groups. Females begin dying when their brood reaches the 5th instar.

== Behavior ==
=== Reproduction ===
Anelosimus jabaquara reproduction begins in December, and the brood develops from April to October through the care of the females. Each female lays at least one egg sac containing around 27 eggs. The female is able to produce a second sac after abandoning the first. If a female's egg sac is experimentally removed, she will try to steal an egg sac from another female. Female size is positively correlated with clutch size.

=== Daily activity ===
The spiders remain under leaves during the hottest hours of the day. During this time, they stay in the resting position with their legs retracted under the cephalothorax. In the evening the spiders leave the leafy area above the web sheet, “the retreat,” in order to renew the silk threads in the web or to position themselves to wait for prey to be captured. During cold and rainy days, the spiders are active throughout the day. Prey capture can happen during the daytime if the prey vibrates enough to attract the spider to leave the retreat to capture the prey.

=== Female guarding behavior ===
Eggs sacs are kept in the retreat, guarded by the female. Females guarding their egg sacs move very little and therefore no new silk threads are added to the web during this period. The only times females leave their eggs sacs are to capture prey or copulate. A female that is guarding her egg sac will attack an approaching female by touching the female with its front pair of legs, biting, or pursuing it for a distance. It is hypothesized that the aggressiveness towards other females is used as a means to protect the egg sac or brood from cannibalism.

=== Feeding behavior ===
Adult males, females, and juveniles participate in prey capture. Bigger females attack the prey first by biting the thorax and abdomen of the prey. The smaller females join by biting the appendages or releasing silk threads over the prey. After the prey is immobilized by the females, the males will bite the thorax and abdomen of the prey. Juveniles in their fourth instar will aid by biting the appendages of the prey. Females feed on the prey in groups, or if they prey is small, they break the prey into parts and feed individually. Dead females are eaten by the juveniles or other adult females.

== Colony formation ==
Colony formation usually occurs through the construction of small solitary webs by adult or subadult females, though it may occur through colony budding. Some subadult females found new colonies following solitary dispersal, while others remain in their natal nests. It is argued that emigration is a consequence of a strong selection pressure to maximize food availability before the egg-laying season. Emigrating females are significantly larger and lay larger clutches, while smaller females do not disperse and lay significantly larger eggs. Because emigration requires high-energy expenditure, it is hypothesized that smaller females do not disperse because they are unable to do so successfully.

== Colony characteristics ==
Colony sizes are small, ranging from 1 to 55 individuals. This suggests that the colonies are the result of one or two females that matured and reproduced. Once the colony is established, females do not leave the web unless it is greatly damaged. The subadult sex ratio is biased towards females with around 1.8 females per male. Anelosimus jabaquara colonies are composed of individuals of the same instar or differing by one molt, except during the overlap of maternal and filial generations.

== Web structure ==
Web structure is very variable. Webs are usually shaped like a sheet over the branches. The size of the colonial web ranges from 20 cm^2 to 4000 cm^2. The sheet functions as protection from enemies coming from underneath the web. Above the sheet is an area made up of leaves surrounded by loosely spun non-adhesive silk threads, called "the retreat". The spiders commonly hide underneath these leaves during the day.
