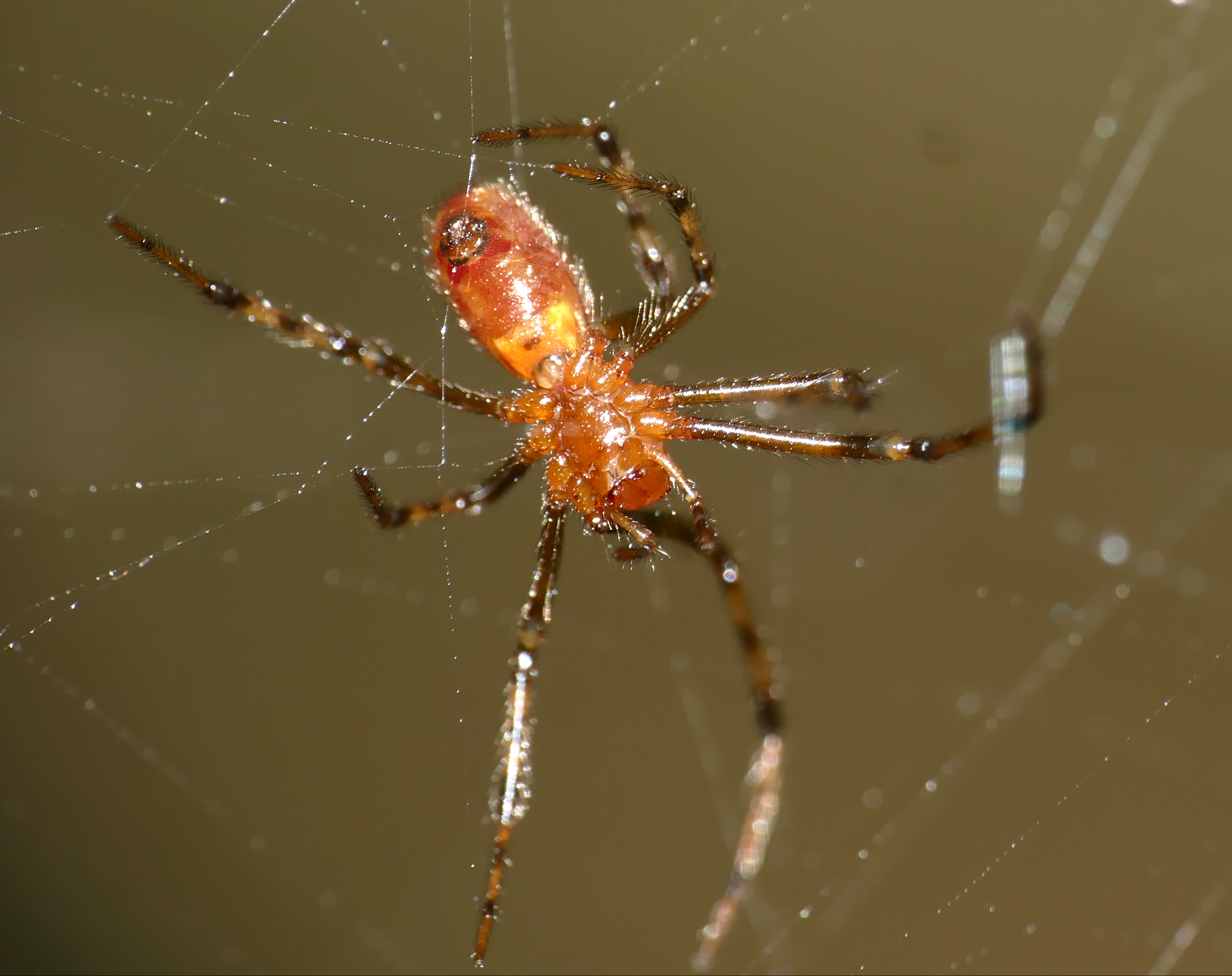

Scientific classification
- Kingdom: Animalia
- Phylum: Arthropoda
- Subphylum: Chelicerata
- Class: Arachnida
- Order: Araneae
- Infraorder: Araneomorphae
- Family: Theridiidae
- Genus: Anelosimus
- Species: A. eximius

Binomial name
- Anelosimus eximius Keyserling, 1884

= Anelosimus eximius =

Species of spider

Anelosimus eximius is a species of social spider in the genus Anelosimus, native to the Lesser Antilles and the area from Panama to Argentina. Colonies can comprise several thousand individuals.

== Habitat and distribution ==
The natural range of A. eximius extends from Panama to southern Brazil in its north-south direction and from Trinidad and eastern Brazil to Peru in its east-west direction. It inhabits rainforest and second-growth forest habitats.

== Web construction ==
A. eximius webs consist of a roughly oval, horizontal sheet of nonadhesive silk, retreats constructed from leaves curled and held in place with silk, and vertical threads, referred to as "knockdown threads", that extend from the sheet and retreats to branches above the web. Webs can be found from ground level to up to 20 meters of height within forest canopies. In size, webs can range from 10-25 cm in length to over 3 m across. The smallest webs are typically home to only a few spiders, while the largest can contain hundreds or thousands of individuals.

Web maintenance is performed mainly by adult females and by juveniles at the third instar or older, which repair structural damage and reinforce existing sheets. Debris, such as prey remains, empty egg sacs, and plant material, are removed by dropping over the edge of the web. Juveniles frequently attempt to perform maintenance tasks, but most larger debris are removed by adult females.

== Behavior ==
=== Social behavior ===
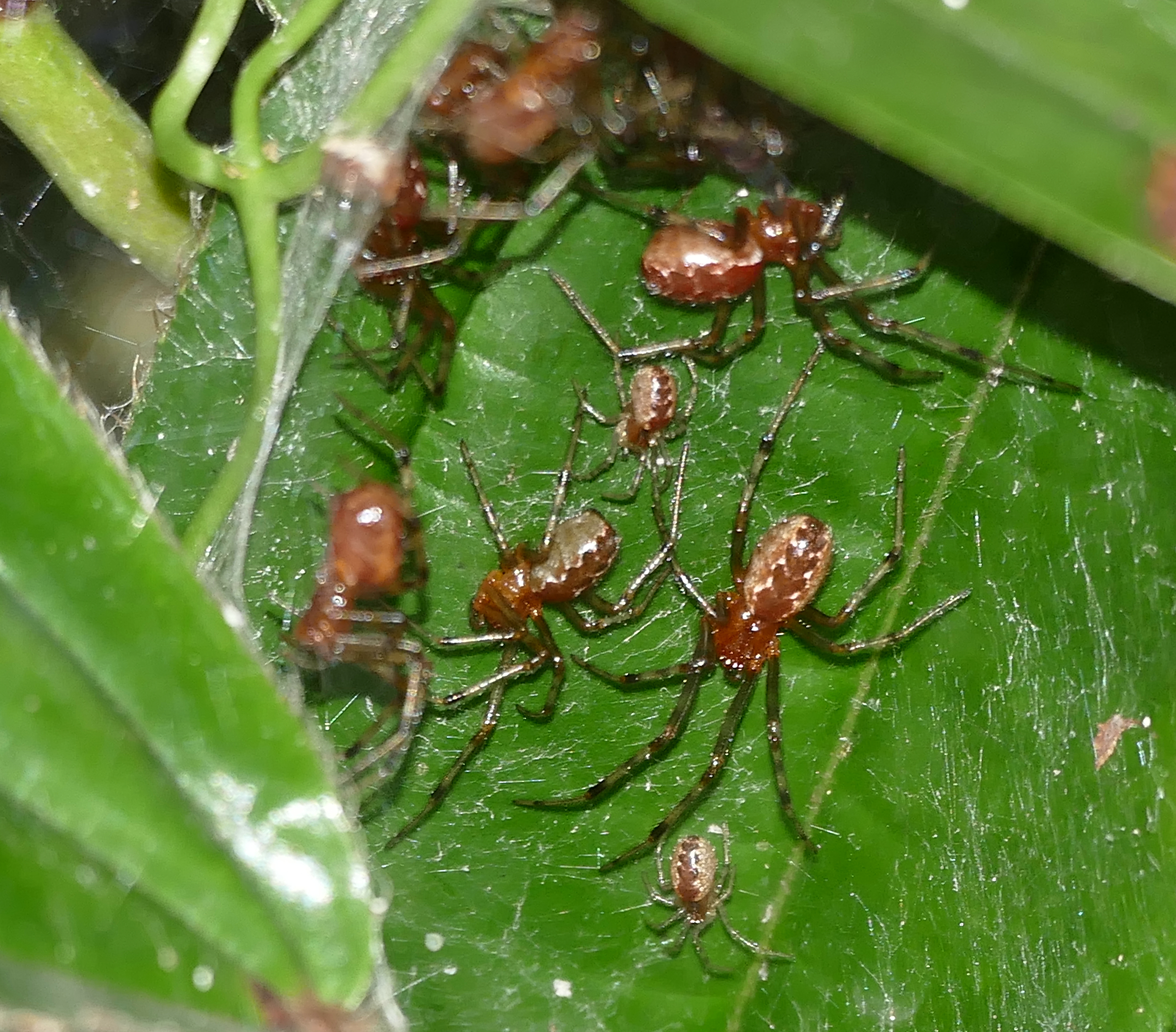
A group of A. eximius in a communal web.

Anelosimus eximius are classified as a social spider species because they engage in shared brood care and cooperate to capture prey within their web, which allows them to capture prey much larger than a single individual would be able to. Mature colonies consist of a mixture of adult and immature individuals of both sexes. The sex ratio is skewed towards females, as males only make up between 5% and 22% of a given colony's population.

The sociality of Anelosimus eximius aids in the increased fitness of the species. One potential cost of sociality in Anelosimus eximius is that they produce fewer egg sacs. However, each egg sac holds more individual offspring than most arachnid egg sacs would normally hold. Thus, the benefits seem to outweigh the costs.

One trait that facilitated the shift from solitary to social behavior in the genus Anelosimus is the lack of discrimination against foreign offspring. It has also been questioned whether the alloparental behavior of Anelosimus eximius was an ancestral trait or if the species had to overcome an instinct to discriminate in favor of one's own offspring and to reject or drive away other individuals' in order to develop sociality. Through studies on social and sub-social species that observed reactions to foreign offspring, scientists discovered that the species did not need to overcome discrimination; both sub-social and social species of arachnids showed no discrimination towards foreign offspring, as sub-social species do not encounter unrelated juveniles often enough to develop an instinctive aversion to them. Communal egg and juvenile care also ensures that a female's offspring will be cared for in the event of her death.

Maintenance behavior in A. eximus colonies is divided by age and sex groups. Adult females perform the largest share of web maintenance and pr. Juveniles of both sexes also perform web maintenance, while adult males do not. Adults preferentially maintain the upper regions of the web, while juveniles do not show a preference in location.

=== Reproduction ===
Reproduction occurs throughout the year. Eggs sacs are laid beneath leaf canopies and tended to by females, which maintain position near a single sac. Additional females may position themselves near a sac if one is unattended. Tending females groom and clean the surface of their sacs, and occasionally remove silk from them or move them to other leaves.

After hatching, clutches of spiderlings remain together for several days. Juveniles stay beneath leaf canopies until their third instar, at which point they move to the upper strands of the web. Young are fed by regurgitation; females will feed young other than their own.

=== Prey capture and feeding ===
Anelosimus eximius are notable for favoring large prey items, which make up a much larger portion of their diet compared to solitary or less social species. A. eximius colonies are recorded to primarily capture prey in the 10-20 mm range with peaks reaching up to 50 mm or more, while solitary species from the same locations rarely take prey exceeding 10 mm in size. In a comparative study, large prey items such as wasps, bees, coleopterans, lepidopterans, heteropterans, blattodeans and orthopterans were found to make up 74.8% of the diet of A. eximius but only 22.5% of the diet of Anelosimus jucundus, a related but less social species. Smaller prey is often ignored by the spiders and is typically able to escape from the web. A. eximius webs typically makes use of non-sticky "knockdown strands" up to several meters long which are strung across open flyways through which larger flying insects tend to move.

Insects that collide with these strands fall into the web below, where their struggling movements attract the spiders. Large groups of spiders will swarm captured insects; larger prey and animals that struggle longer will typically attract more spiders. Groups of 30-50 spiders or more can be observed attacking a single large insect. Large prey items are afterwards fed on collectively by multiple individual spiders. The spiders subdue prey through biting and throwing silk over it. When attacking larger prey or animals capable of causing injury, the spiders use stickier silk than otherwise. There is little coordination during these events outside of avoiding contact with other spiders to limit the potential of throwing silk over them.

A. eximius webs do not capture large numbers of prey, but the prey that are caught are significantly larger than most prey captured in the webs of other individual social or antisocial spider species. Thus, their techniques provide more nutrients than other social spider colonies may obtain. These techniques are most efficient in Anelosimus eximius colonies of about 1,000 individuals.

=== Colony distribution ===
Colony distribution is known to occur in two manners: budding and dispersal. Budding occurs when an established colony splits into two or more independent webs, either due to being broken by falling debris or other accidents or due to a number of spiders establishing a secondary web in its vicinity. Dispersal occurs when a large number of mated females leave the colony and disperse individually, each creating a solitary web. These solitary females may be joined by other dispersing individuals, typically other females whose attempts to establish a new colony have failed. New colonies with multiple founders tend to be encountered near established webs, while single-founder webs are usually more distant. Males and juveniles do not leave their natal webs during dispersal events. Newly-founded webs have high failure rates, but are more likely to survive if joined by other females. The primary cause of new colony failure is predation, usually by other theridiid spiders or by wasps. Small webs, particularly ones without remaining adult spiders, are also vulnerable to storms due to the limited ability of juveniles or solitary females to repair them.

These patterns of distribution lead to A. eximius colonies often occurring in aggregations of two to forty distinct webs, which may be separated from other such clusters by distances ranging from a few meters to several kilometers. Colonies within a single cluster tend to be derived from budding events, while distinct clusters may originally become established through dispersal founder events. Neighboring colonies are typically in close proximity, and may share the same knockdown threads or be in physical contract. Gene flow among colonies within a single cluster is high. Gene flow is low to absent among distinct clusters, as individual spiders do not typically move between unrelated colonies. It is however possible that new colonies might be established by a number of unrelated females. Consequently, populations of A. eximius exist as mosaics consisting of groups of geographically and genetically distinct colony clusters.

== Predators and commensals ==
A. eximius is preyed upon by Zatypota parasitoid wasps, the larva of which feed on the spider's hemolymph and induce the spider to move away and spin an abnormal web, serving as a cocoon for the pupating insect to feed on the spider and emerge. The process is particularly noteworthy because the actions induced do not seem to be part of the spider's typical behaviour repertoire. Trypoxylon wasps have also been recorded to enter A. eximius webs to capture spiders.

A. eximius are often inhabited by commensals of other species. Other theridiid spiders, such as members of the Argyrodes genus, are the most common, and mostly inhabit upper strands. These attempt to feed on prey items, but are not recorded to attack colony members. Crematogaster ants are also known to enter webs, and will feed on prey remains, egg sacs, and spiderlings.
