= Phryganoporus candidus =

Scientific classification
- Domain: Eukaryota
- Kingdom: Animalia
- Phylum: Arthropoda
- Subphylum: Chelicerata
- Class: Arachnida
- Order: Araneae
- Infraorder: Araneomorphae
- Family: Desidae
- Genus: Phryganoporus
- Species: P. candidus

Binomial name
- Phryganoporus candidus (L. Koch, 1872)
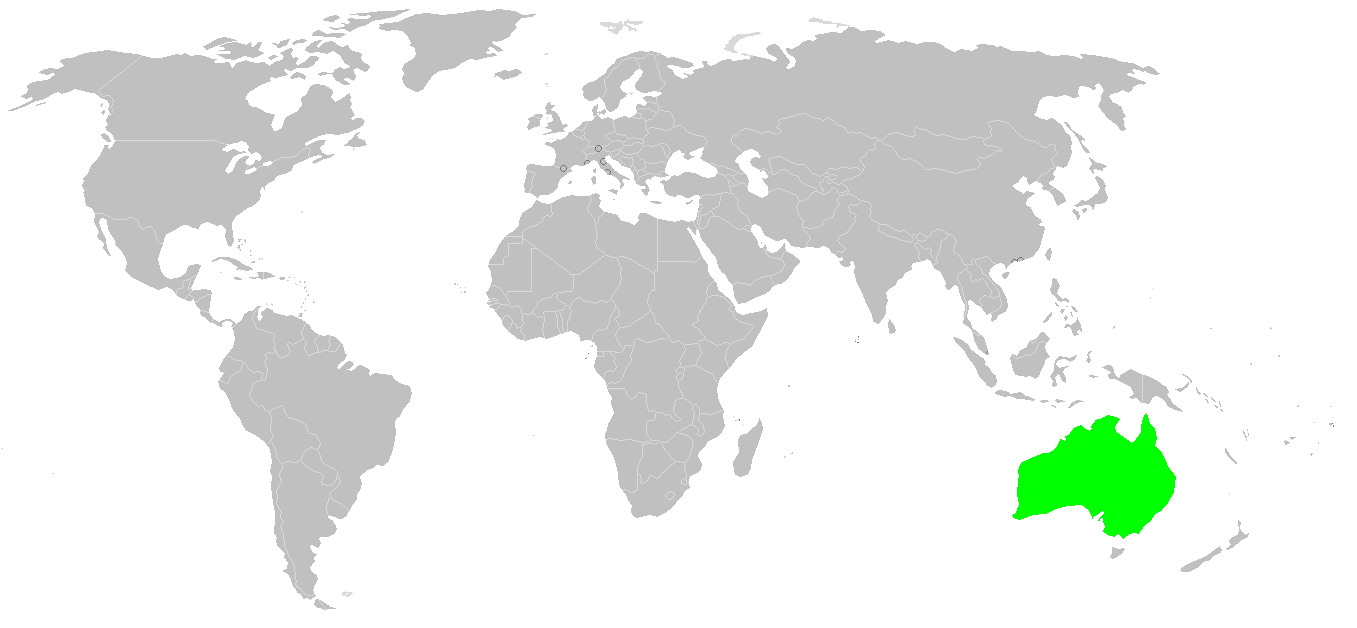

Species of spider

Phryganoporus candidus, also known as the foliage web spider, is a small, subsocial jumping spider endemic to Australia. On average, they are 6–10 mm long and are a mottled brown colour, covered in silvery grey hair. They typically reside in arid and semi-arid locations, building their nests in various trees, bushes, and other plant-life. They have a mutualistic relationship with Acacia ligulata, and therefore prefer to build their nests in these trees.

Pregnant P. candidus females build their nests and their offspring live, hunt, and grow there until maturity. These nests are multidimensional and are full of tunnels which act both offensively and defensively. The tunnels keep predators away and help to keep prey trapped inside.

== Description ==
Phryganoporus candidus is a small spider, with both males and females typically measuring 6–10 mm long. Their main body colouration is brown, but they have patterning across their bodies in lighter shades of brown. Additionally, P. candidus are covered in a fine silvery grey hair and the density of the hair varies from spider to spider. Females can be identified by their rounded spermathecal lobes. Males, unlike other closely related spiders, have palps without any easily apparent patellar offshoots.

== Taxonomy ==
P. candidus is a part of the Phryganoporus genus' candida subgroup which consists of three spiders. The name of the group is derived from the Latin word candidus, which translates to “shining white”. The spiders were given this name due to the silvery colouration their legs have due to the hairs that cover their body. P. candidus was not uniformly named for a long time after its discovery, and therefore is known by many names in literature: Badumna candida, A. gausapatus, and P. g. occidentalis.

== Habitat and distribution ==
P. candidus are widespread throughout the Australian mainland, typically residing in arid and semi-arid locations. They prefer to build their nests in open forest, open scrub, or open woodlands. As P. candidus has a mutualistic relationship with Acacia ligulata, they tend to build their nests on those trees, but are not exclusive to them.

== Diet ==
P. candidus consume a large variety of arthropods, including Elateridae (beetles), blattidae (cockroaches), and coccinellidae (lady bugs). They are fairly general feeders, however, and will typically eat whatever manages to get caught in their webbing, even other types of spiders that are trying to consume their eggs. Most feeding occurs in the evening after they have made any necessary repairs to their nest. Mealybugs, which can be found scavenging in their nests and would make a very opportune prey for P. candidus, are immune to their predation. No exact reason is known why, but it is assumed to be due to the waxy filament that covers their body and their defensive secretions.

== Nests ==
P. candidus nests are elaborately built, consisting of many materials like leaves, twigs, and other debris that is bound together with their webbing. They are constructed by a single founding pregnant female in the late summer and are mazes of tunnels to help trap their prey. While she is making the nest, the founding female will interlace it with pheromones to help reduce competition and increase coordination between her offspring, who will be the other inhabitants of the nest. By the end of summer, however, the nests are full of the founder’s offspring, with an average of about 100 spiders in each nest.

The nests are typically 0.02 ± 0.005 m3, with prey getting trapped and consumed in the center of the nest.

P. candidus are not the only inhabitants of the nest. When taken in for observation, these nests were found to be full of many other arthropods, including a multitude of predators and scavengers trying to take advantage of P. candidus. One example of this is Simaetha species, which live on the edge of the nests and consume any insects stuck on the outside of the nests. They are able to avoid getting caught in the web and being consumed by P. candidus by only treading on vegetation and older, non-sticky part of the webbing.

== Predators ==
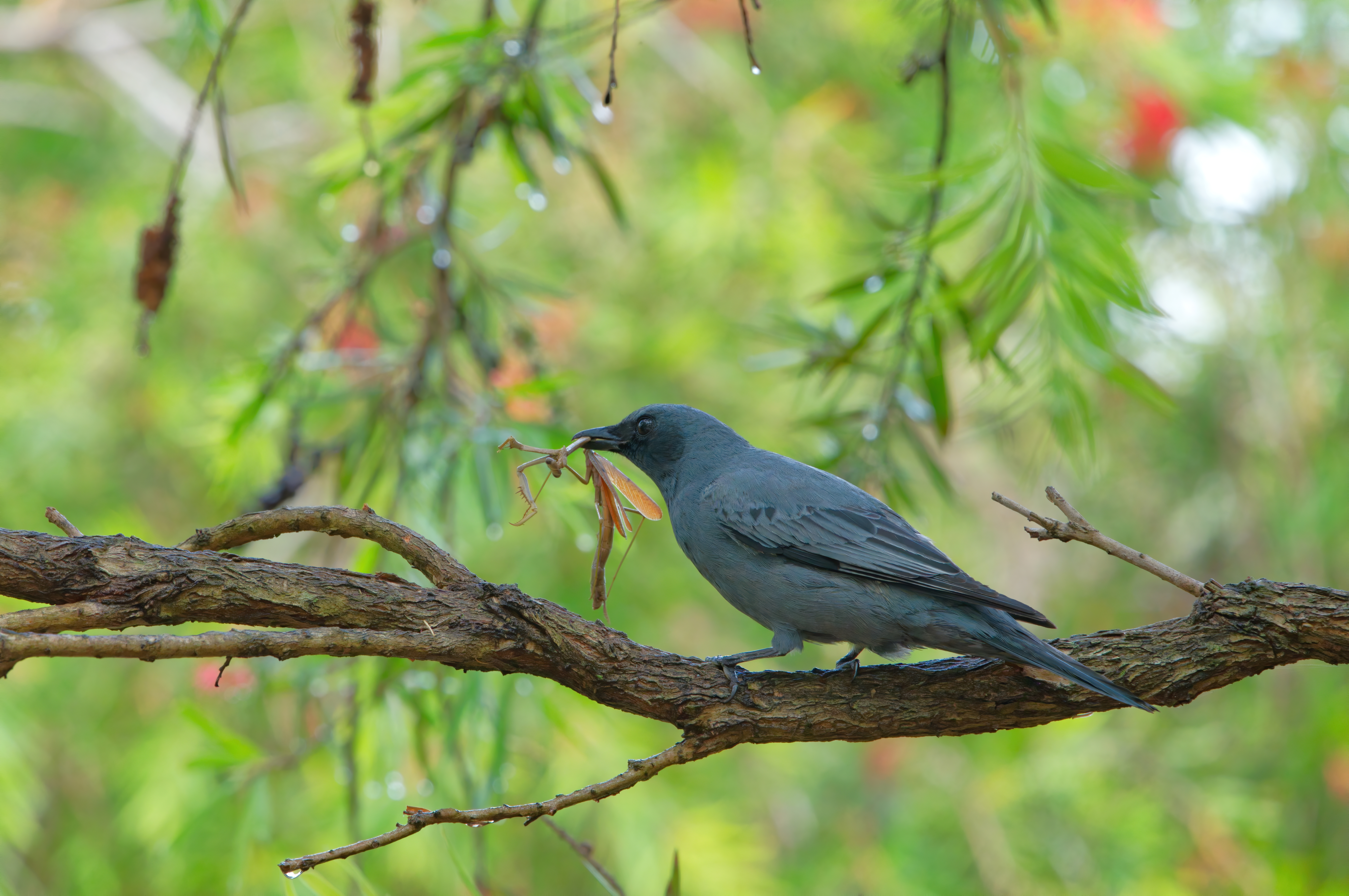
Black-faced cuckooshrike, predator

P. candidus have a multitude of predators. Some predators that have been found lurking in a P. candidus nest, like gryllacridids (cricket), ground spiders, sac spiders, and huntsman spiders go after adult P. candidus. Outside of the nest, P. candidus falls prey to black-faced cuckooshrike and spangled drongo. These two predators are diurnal, however, while P. candidus is a nocturnal spider, so they are not as commonly in danger from these birds. Adult P. candidus are not the only ones that are targets of predation. Pentatomidae (stink bugs) and mantid lacewings are egg predators that will also try to make their way into a P. candidus nest in attempts to consume the eggs. P. candidus eggs are also at risk from oceophorid (moth) egg parasitism.

== Reproduction and lifecycle ==
Juvenile females will leave their birth nest when they are in their penultimate (second-to-last) instar, right before they are sexually mature. Males wait to leave the maternal nest until they are fully mature. This staggering in dispersal helps to reduce inbreeding and promotes gene exchange between nests. Males are considered sexually mature when their palps are fully developed. Females are fully mature when their epigyne is fully crosslinked. They then mate (mating and courtship behaviour detailed below), but not all mating results in egg sac production. If egg sacs are produced from matings, they will be covered in spider silk and safely placed in a new mother’s nest as they develop. Egg sacs can carry a varying amount of spiderlings, but the average in the wild is around 25 spiderlings per sac. A mother will produce a few sacs and spiderlings will start to emerge around April.

== Behaviour ==
=== Social behaviour ===
P. candidus are considered a subsocial species, as they only cooperate as juveniles due to the pheromones the mother secretes as she builds the natal nest. Their type of sociality is classified as a periodic social life cycle; they are only social for their juvenile and (for females) mother life periods. Sub-adult female spiders, regardless of relation, are known to work together to bring down prey, as long as they are not looking for territory to build nests. If two female spiders looking to set up nests or two male spiders are in close proximity, they will fight each other to reduce local competition.

=== Mating and courtship ===
Males will approach females and begin drumming their palps. If the female is interested, she will respond back and the two spiders will make contact with each other's forelegs, and there may be some other contact, like nipping at each other. Once the initial contact is done, the courtship will go one of two ways. There will either be a standoff if the female does not want to mate, or there will be a mating. If there is a standoff, the male may try to keep courting or he will flee so he is not attacked. If the female is amenable to mating, then they will assume their mating positions. They will face different directions and the male will begin to maneuver around the female as he mounts. One notable unique quality of P. candidus mating is that the males do not charge their palps during the courtship or mating. Instead, it is thought that they do this before entering into courtship with a female. There will usually be multiple mating sessions in a courtship, as these rituals can last anywhere from two to six hours. After mating the male will leave the female. Sexual cannibalism can occur with P. candidus, but it is not common. Females will mate with multiple males, and there has been no observed differences in her willingness to mate with subsequent males.

=== Parental care ===
Maternal care, especially as the spiderlings are developing in the egg sac, is important for the survival of P. candidus. Orphan spiderlings have nine times the mortality rate of those that were cared for by their mother. Females do not directly feed their young, but they do sometimes allow them to feed off a carcass of some prey that she has captured. Mothers also release pheromones into their web as they are building it to ensure that the offspring cooperate while they are living together. Females rear their own offspring, and do not cooperatively rear other female’s offspring.

=== Hunting ===
Due to their subsocial behaviour, P. candidus juveniles will hunt and catch prey in a group. While hunting in groups, the spiderling that is closest to the prey will attack first, and the others will then follow after. This group hunting behaviour is not seen with adults, though mothers will sometimes share some of their catch with her young offspring. P. candidus will mostly go after prey that is caught in their nest, but do not typically kill prey during the day, as they are at higher risk of predation themselves during the day. Large spiders are more likely to attack prey than smaller ones, most probably due to their larger size making it less dangerous to attack. Additionally, sub-adult females are more likely to attack prey then sub-adult males.

== Mutualism ==
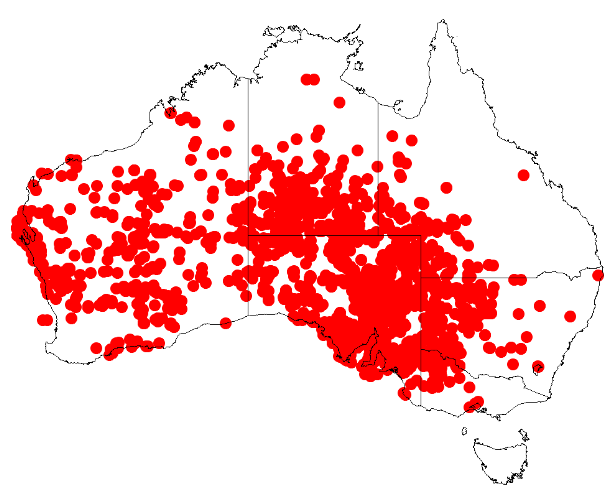
Distribution of Acacia ligulata

P. candidus has a mutualistic relationship with the tree Acacia ligulata. A. ligulata is a flowering plant that is widespread through Australia. It flowers in September and then develops its fruit over the following couple of months before dispersing its seeds in late summer.

P. candidus nests encompass the fruit on A. ligulata trees. This is beneficial to the trees, as the spider nests protect the fruit from predation. One research project on this mutualistic relationship found that plants with nests have between 20 and 406 percent more seeds than those without. The researchers on this project were also able to quantify lower pest damage on the trees that were inhabited by P. candidus; for example, Weevil damage was decreased 54 to 95 percent.

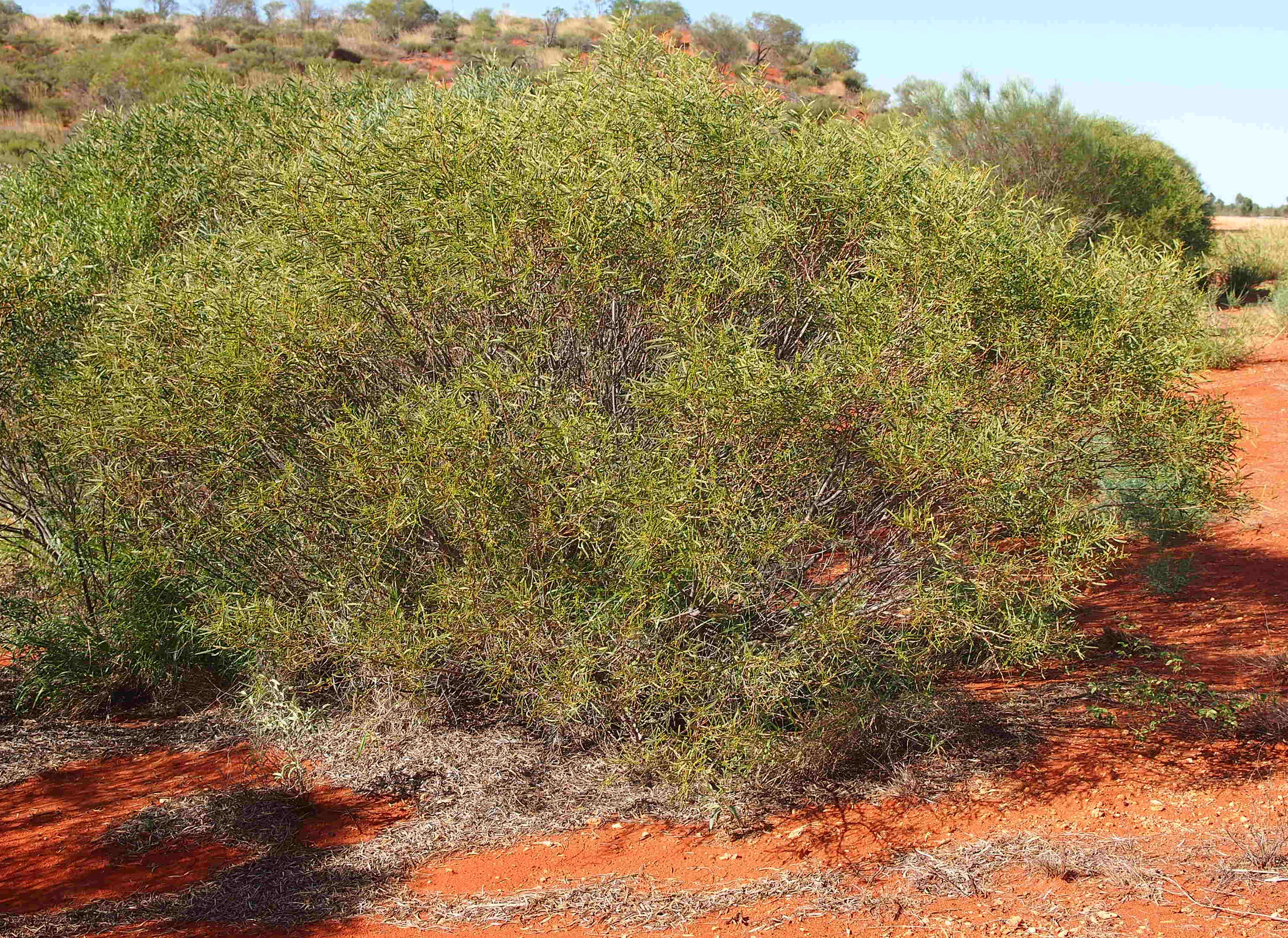
Acacia ligulata, with which P. candidus has a mutualistic relationship

P. candidus that build their nests in living A. ligulata have larger nest volumes than in other tree species and their nests persist for longer. P. candidus nesting in A. ligulata are also able to capture more prey and consume more and better nutrients than those that built their nests in other tree species.

As both species protect each other, their mutualistic relationship is categorized as protection mutualism.

== Physiology ==
P. candidus have eight eyes, one larger main pair and three smaller pairs. The positioning of their eyes helps them to better identify prey both peripherally and in direct line of sight. Their main pair of eyes can see over 30 body lengths in front of them, and helps them to identify potential mates, rivals, and predators. P. candidus are able to make these identifications based on the shape and motion of the creature.

== Interactions with humans and livestock ==
While generally not a nuisance, P. candidus can be a pest to farmers and orchardists, who have complained of foliage matting, leaf falling, and limb damage due to their trees being infested with these spiders. P. candidus can also be a hindrance to livestock, who are unable to consume and digest plants that are inhabited with spiders.

== Venom ==
Phryganoporus candidus uses its venom to capture its prey. It does so by releasing its venom through the chelicerae. After it captures its prey, it is known to wrap the prey in silk whilst it is paralyzed for later consumption. However, the venom is not dangerous to humans. There have been no known cases of humans being bit by the spider. The reason why it can paralyze prey but not humans is likely that the venom is injected in low quantities that can only effect small organisms.
