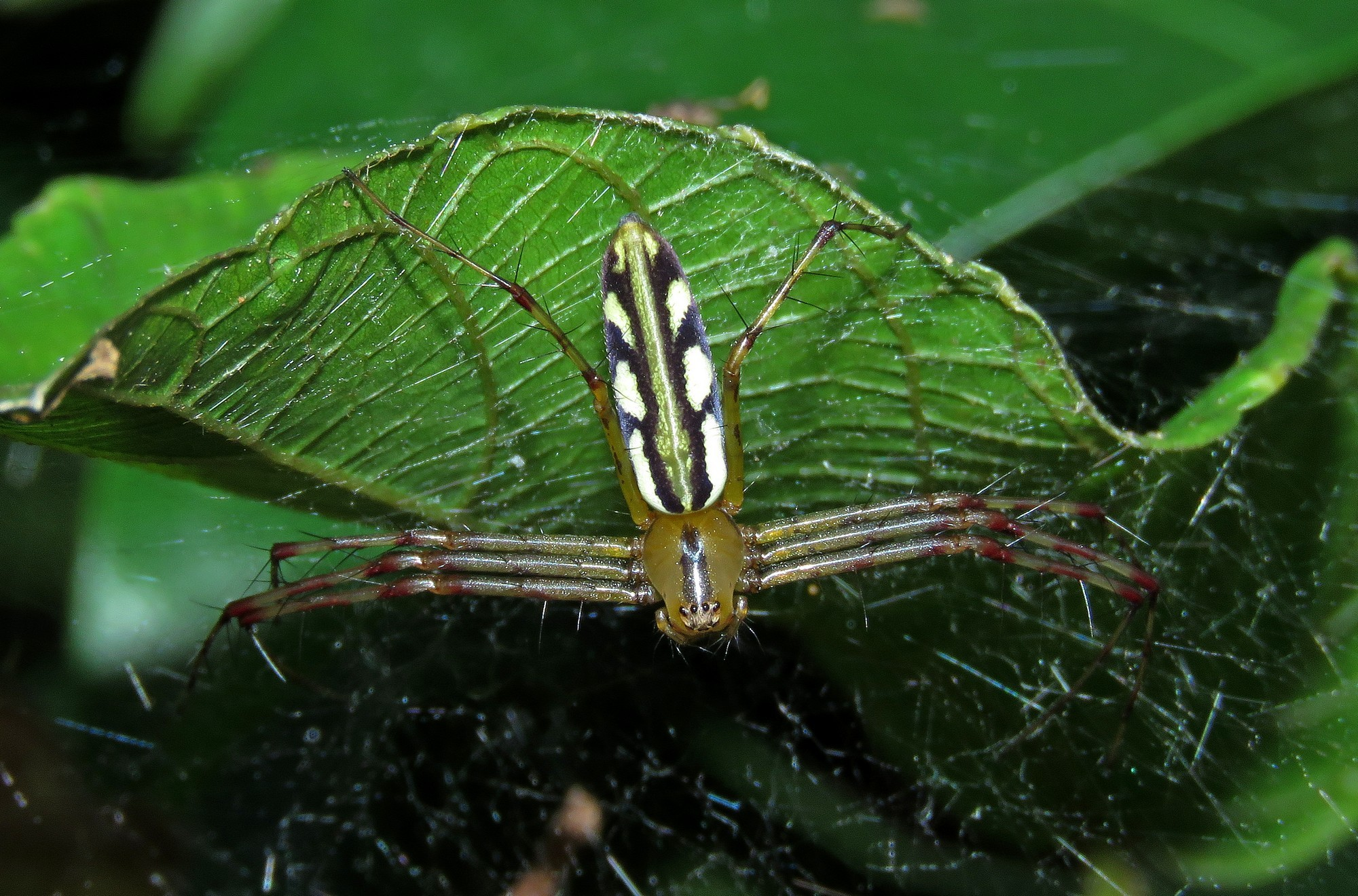
- T. longipes

Scientific classification
- Kingdom: Animalia
- Phylum: Arthropoda
- Subphylum: Chelicerata
- Class: Arachnida
- Order: Araneae
- Infraorder: Araneomorphae
- Family: Oxyopidae
- Genus: Tapinillus; Simon, 1898

Type species
- T. longipes (Taczanowski, 1872)

Species
- T. longipes (Taczanowski, 1872); T. purpuratus Mello-Leitão, 1940; T. roseisterni Mello-Leitão, 1930

= Tapinillus =

Genus of spiders

Tapinillus is a genus of lynx spiders that was first described by Eugène Louis Simon in 1898.

Its three described species are found in South America, Panama, and Costa Rica.

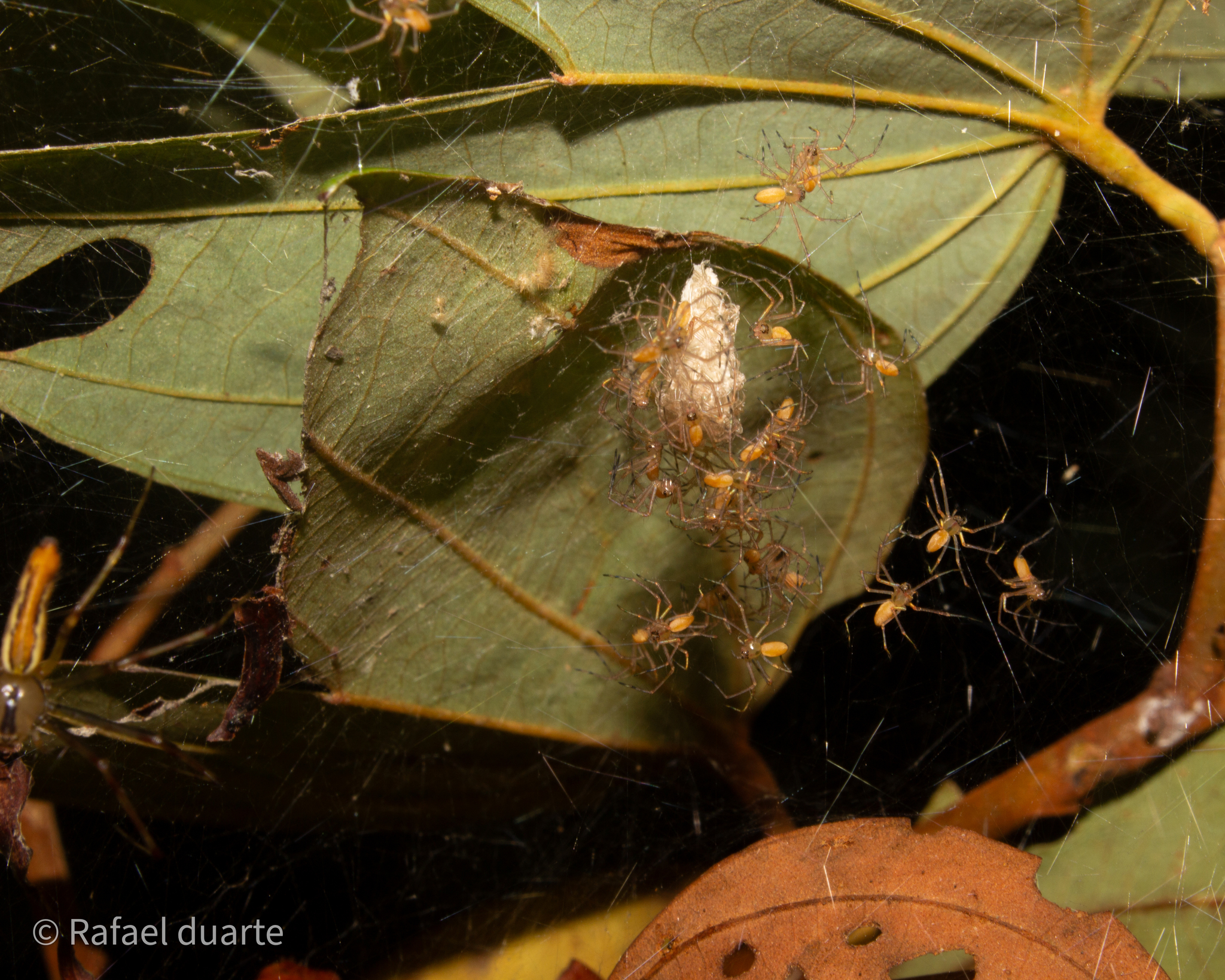
T. longipes spiderlings

== Species ==
As of October 2025, this genus includes three species:

- Tapinillus longipes (Taczanowski, 1872) – Costa Rica, Panama, Colombia, Venezuela, French Guiana, Trinidad & Tobago, Peru, Brazil, Argentina (type species)
- Tapinillus purpuratus Mello-Leitão, 1940 – Brazil
- Tapinillus roseisterni Mello-Leitão, 1930 – Brazil
