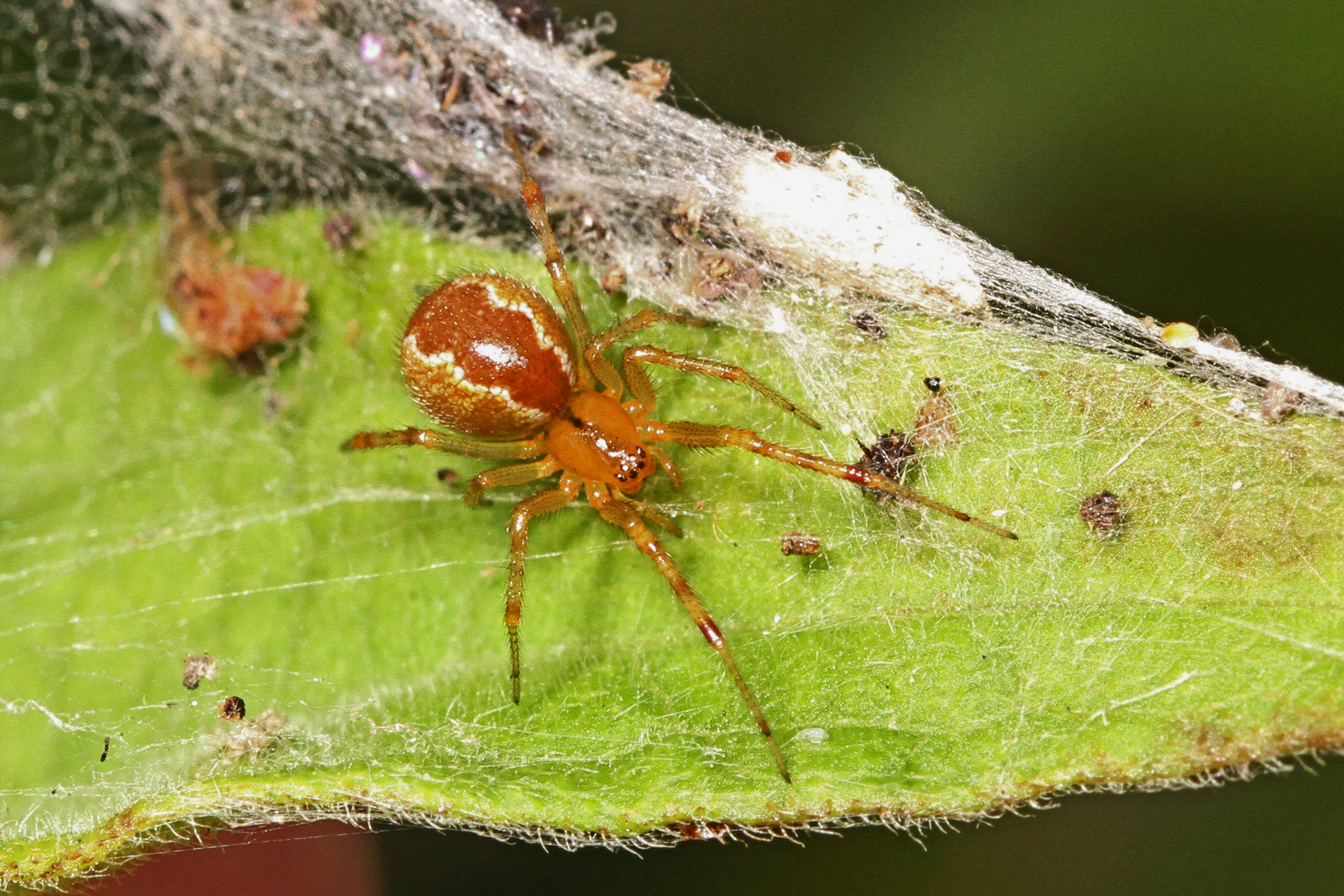

Scientific classification
- Kingdom: Animalia
- Phylum: Arthropoda
- Subphylum: Chelicerata
- Class: Arachnida
- Order: Araneae
- Infraorder: Araneomorphae
- Family: Theridiidae
- Genus: Anelosimus
- Species: A. studiosus

Binomial name
- Anelosimus studiosus (Hentz, 1850)

Synonyms
- Anelosimus tungurahua Agnarsson, 2006

= Anelosimus studiosus =

Species of spider

Anelosimus studiosus is a subsocial tangle web spider or theridiid spider living in both North America and South America. In 2012, genetic analysis revealed a previously identified species, A. tungurahua, is in fact the same species as A. studiosus.

Anelosimus studiosus is part of the comb-footed spider family, Theridiidae, and can be found throughout much of North and South America, as it is a tropical and temperate spider. A. studiosus exhibit social polymorphism with two behavioral phenotypes; social spiders that live communally, and asocial solitary spiders. Social spiders not only share the same living space, but also share in the duties of brood care and capturing of prey, while asocial spiders live completely alone and will attack other female spiders that encroach its nesting territory. Populations displaying the social phenotype, generally are not found below 30˚ latitude, and the social phenotype becomes increasingly common moving north. Studies suggest that the correlation between a higher frequency of social phenotypes and colder temperatures is due to decreased survival rates amongst mothers and delayed juvenile development in colder temperatures. In other words, it is believed that sociality developed in A. studiosus in order to mitigate fitness costs for offspring should their mother die before the brood is ready to disperse and survive on their own. Despite drastic differences in behavioral phenotypes, both social and asocial spiders readily interbreed and produce viable offspring. Research on the relatedness of the socially polymorphic spider shows that social spiders in any given nest are more closely related genetically than asocial spiders. These findings suggest that social spiders have a lower dispersal distance than asocial spiders. Spiders that are more closely related genetically and display the social phenotype incur a fitness advantage by staying close to the nest and cooperating with their relatives Although the emergence of a social phenotype may increase survival rates of offspring in the short term, research suggests it may cause long-term fitness consequences. Development of a social phenotype ultimately leads to a loss of aggression; meaning social spiders are less likely to fight off predators than their asocial counterparts. Social spiders can produce more young in a shorter period of time than asocial spiders, but when predators are introduced, nests of social spiders suffer high predation. This has been suggested to potentially lead to the extinction of large populations of A. studiosus.
