= Social spider =

Spiders that form long-lasting aggregations

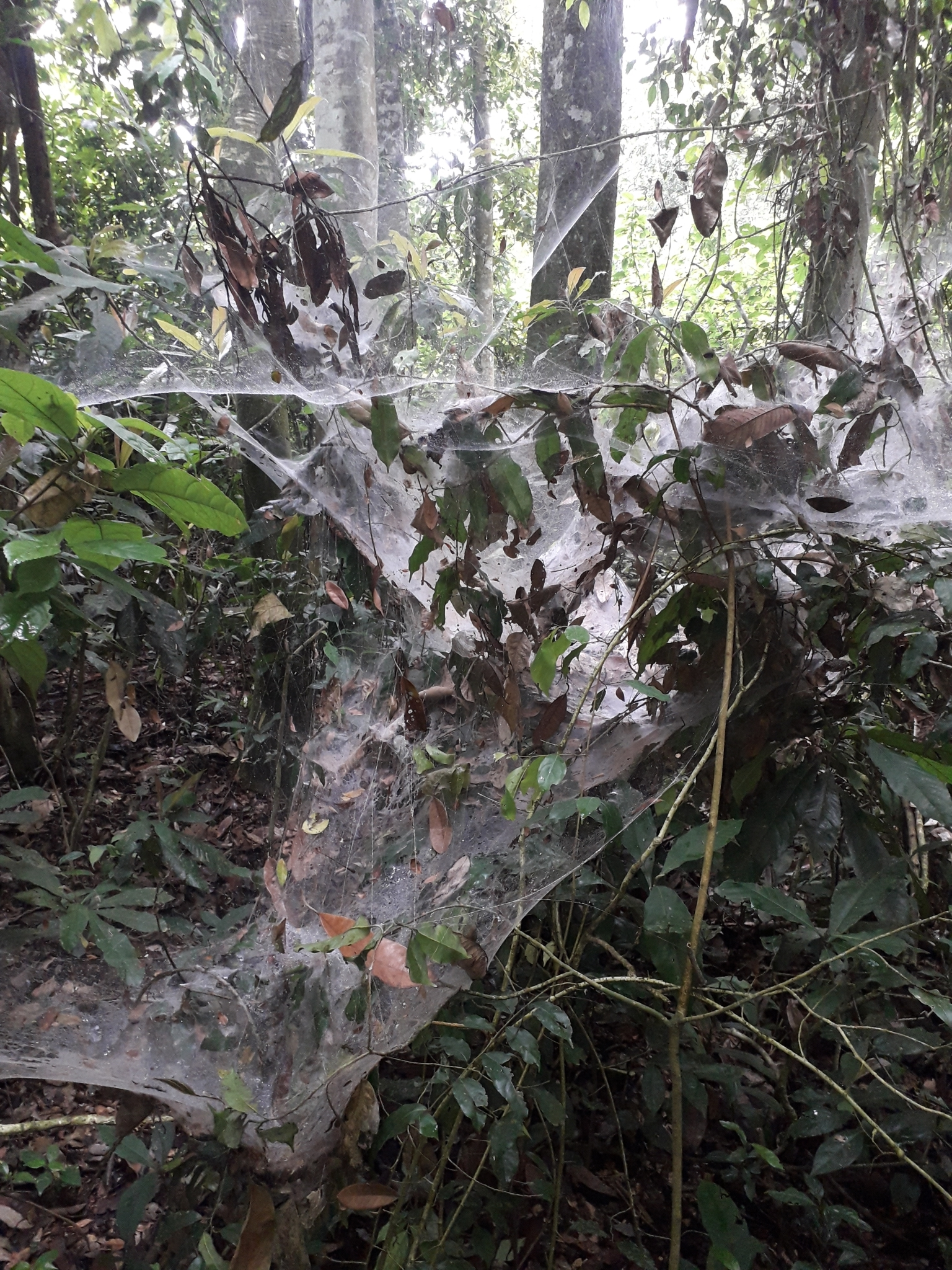
A collective web of Agelena consociata in Uganda.

A social spider is a spider species whose individuals form relatively long-lasting aggregations. Whereas most spiders are solitary and even aggressive toward other members of their own species, some hundreds of species in several families show a tendency to live in groups, often referred to as colonies.

== Spider sociality ==
Most species of social spiders live in the tropical regions of the world where size and density of their prey – insects – is highest, though several species reach into the eastern United States and other temperate areas. By building a communal web, it is thought that the spiders approximately maximize total biomass capture per spider. Having a larger web and multiple spiders to work together to subdue prey allows them to prey on larger organisms that would not be possible if they led a solitary existence. The colonies can grow large enough to take down birds and bats, as well as very large insects.

Living in a colony also has another major benefit for spiders: cooperative nest maintenance. Nest maintenance does not rely solely on an individual in a colony setting and thus saves on a per-capita investment in maintaining silk structures. Predator defense is also increased in a colony with a large web and multiple individuals analogous to schools of fish or herds of mammals.

=== Levels ===
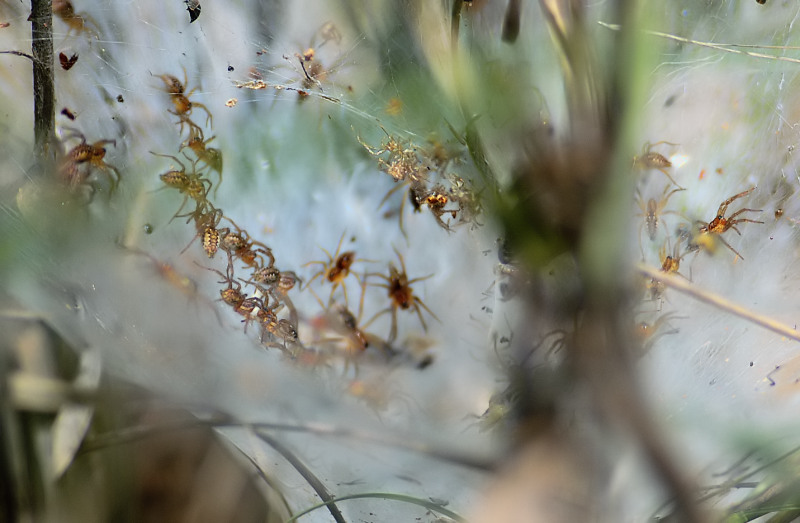
Social spiders from Bengaluru, India

Social spiders exhibit varying levels of sociality, of which there are six defined. Agnarsson et al. estimate that spiders as a whole have independently evolved sociality 18 or 19 times. Most of these social spiders broadly fit into the quasi-social definition of sociality, meaning they show cooperative brood care, use the same nest (web), and have some amount of generational overlap. Several permutations of social behavior exist amongst the 23 species of spider considered to be quasi-social out of some 45,000 known species of spider. These 23 species are phylogenetically scattered in 11 genera across eight widely separated families.

The level of sociality often varies between species (interspecies) but can vary within a species (intraspecies) as well. Intraspecific variation is generally habitat dependent, where some populations within a species show all the characteristics of quasi-sociality, yet a population a mile away may be largely solitary because they inhabit a different environment. This facultative sociality allows them to survive periods of sub-optimal conditions, when sustaining large aggregations is not feasible. Some of these aggregations can contain as many as 50,000 individuals as in the case of Anelosimus eximius (in the family Theridiidae). The genus Anelosimus has a strong tendency towards sociality: all known American species are social, and species in Madagascar are at least somewhat social.

Members of other species in the same family but several different genera have independently developed social behavior. For example, although Theridion nigroannulatum belongs to a genus with no other social species, T. nigroannulatum build colonies that may contain several thousand individuals that co-operate in prey capture and share food. Other communal spiders include several Philoponella species (family Uloboridae), Agelena consociata (family Agelenidae) and Mallos gregalis (family Dictynidae). Social predatory spiders need to defend their prey against kleptoparasites ("thieves"), and larger colonies are more successful in this. The herbivorous spider Bagheera kiplingi lives in small colonies which helps to protect eggs and spiderlings. Even widow spiders (genus Latrodectus), which are notoriously aggressive and cannibalistic, have formed small colonies in captivity, sharing webs and feeding together.

A few species, such as Anelosimus eximius, are also known to have reproductive skew, where some of the females reproduce and others do not. Even though these spiders cooperate by caring for each other's young, cooperating in prey capture and sharing food, they are not considered eusocial as they do not have defined castes. Any female has the potential to reproduce, therefore differences in the reproductive success is due to competition for scarce food resources rather than the existence of physically distinct castes.

=== Sub-social ===
Many more species of spider are considered to be more sub-social than quasi-social – meaning they lack fixed or complex social organization. These species may only display social behaviors as a seasonal venture and have an obligate solitary phase. Some other species will establish territories within the colony and can even have discrete webs, narrowly connected to other webs within the colony (such is the case with Leucauge spp.). This is not a fully cooperative behavior as there is little to no cooperative nest maintenance or brood care occurring. The subsocial species, however, appear to be crucial for the evolution of sociality in spiders. Recent theory suggests that social spiders evolved along a restricted pathway through solitary subsocial ancestors. It has been shown that the subsocial spiders of genus Stegodyphus tolerate a low level of inbreeding with low inbreeding depression, suggesting a possible stepping stone towards the fully inbred mating system found in social spiders.

=== Swarming ===
Several social spiders including Parasteatoda wau and Anelosimus eximius also swarm in an analogous way to the eusocial ants, bees and wasps. These species disperse and establish new colonies by means of synchronized emigrations of adult and sub-adult females. After courtship and copulation, but prior to oviposition, many females will emigrate to a new nesting site and deposit their eggs, forming a new colony. In this way social spiders are also extremely inbred, as there is limited migration of males or juveniles to different colonies, forcing the offspring to mate with one another decreasing genetic variation within the colonies. Occasionally males will emigrate with females or will emigrate from one colony to another but this is a rare event and has not been studied sufficiently to quantify for any social spider species. Females can also out-number males as much as 10:1 in many species; this too acts as a genetic bottleneck and further decreases the genetic variation of the species.

== Quasi-social spider families and genera ==
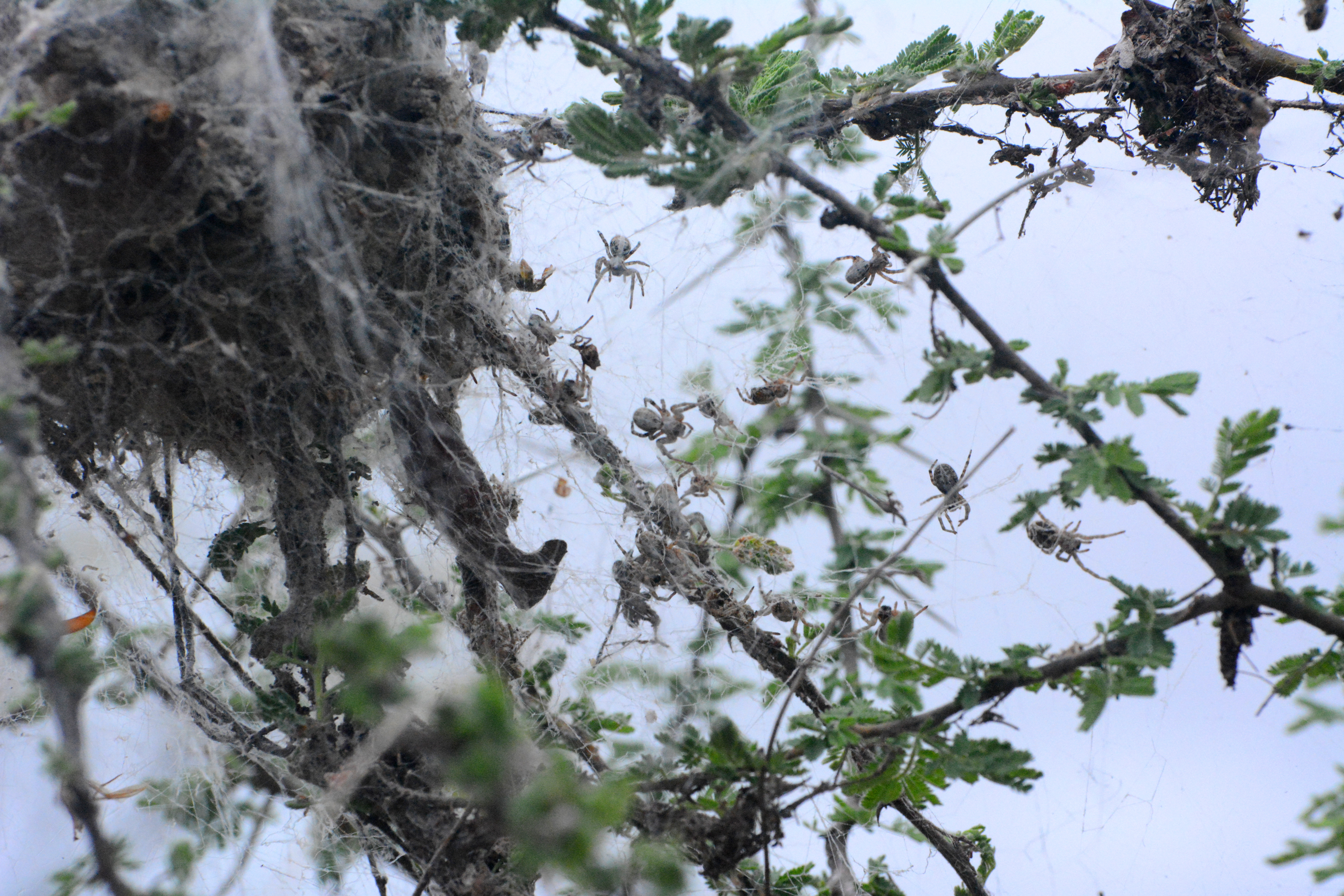
Stegodyphus sp. colony

Species include:

- Agelenidae
  - Agelena consociata
  - Agelena republicana
- Araneidae
  - Parawixia bistriata
- Desidae
  - Phryganoporus candidus
- Dictynidae
  - Aebutina binotata
  - Mallos gregalis
- Eresidae
  - Stegodyphus dumicola
  - Stegodyphus mimosarum
  - Stegodyphus sarasinorum
  - Stegodyphus manaus (possibly social, see Kraus & Kraus 1992)
- Nesticidae
  - Species not identified (Quintero & Amat 1995)
- Oxyopidae
  - Tapinillus sp. (Aviés 1994; Avilés et al. 2001)
- Sparassidae
  - Delena cancerides
- Theridiidae
  - Achaearanea disparata
  - Achaearanea vervortii
  - Anelosimus domingo
  - Anelosimus eximius
  - Anelosimus guacamayos
  - Anelosimus oritoyacu
  - Anelosimus puravida
  - Anelosimus lorenzo
  - Anelosimus rupununi
  - Parasteatoda wau
  - Theridion nigroannulatum
- Thomisidae
  - Australomisidia ergandros
  - Australomisidia inornata (synonym: A. megagyna)
  - Australomisidia socialis
