= Ingi Agnarsson =

Icelandic arachnologist

- Born: 11 January 1971 (age 55); Reykjavík, Iceland
- Known for: Arachnology, biodiversity research
- Scientific career
- Fields: Arachnology
- Workplaces: University of Iceland; University of Puerto Rico

Ingi Agnarsson (born 11 January 1971) is an Icelandic arachnologist. He is also the director of the Zoology Museum of the University of Puerto Rico.

== Biography ==
=== Education ===
Agnarsson began his professional studies at the University of Iceland, where he studied from 1992 to 1995. In the same year he carried out his first arachnological research while working at the Icelandic Institute of Natural History. In 1998 he began studying biological sciences at George Washington University in Washington, D.C., earning his PhD in 2005.

In 1997 he stayed in Uganda conducting research on spider species in Kibale National Park on behalf of the Tropical Biology Association and Makerere University in Kampala.

During his time at George Washington University, Agnarsson frequently participated in fieldwork. In July 1998, he collaborated with students from the University of North Carolina at Chapel Hill on a survey of new spider species in the mountains of North Carolina. In February 2001, he took part in the Tropical Biology course of the Organization for Tropical Studies and the University of Costa Rica.

=== Career ===
Over a span of 14 years, Agnarsson carried out research in many countries in search of new species: Iceland (1993–1998), Uganda (1998), Guyana (July 1999), Hawaii (April 2000), Chile (November–December 2000), South Africa (March–April 2001), Ecuador (2004), French Guiana, Malaysia, Singapore (2005), Mayotte, Mauritius, Réunion and Rodrigues (March–April 2008), Papua New Guinea and New Britain (2009), Panama (April 2010), Madagascar (2001, 2008, 2010), and Costa Rica (2001, 2002, 2004, 2005). He also studied intertidal and terrestrial invertebrates in Iceland (1988–1998) and documented several dolphin species in Panama and Costa Rica (2004–2006).

Agnarsson began his career in 1993 as a research assistant to Agnar Ingolfsson at the biology institute of the University of Iceland. Two years later, he became an independent researcher at the Icelandic Institute of Natural History, where he worked for three years. In 1999, he started a five-year position at the National Museum of Natural History (Smithsonian Institution) as a predoctoral fellow under the supervision of Jonathan Coddington. From 2004 to 2006, he worked as a postdoc at the University of British Columbia, and in 2007, at the University of Akron.

As a researcher, he collaborated with the Slovenian Academy of Sciences and Arts (2007–2009) in Ljubljana and the University of Akron (2007–2008). He is currently an assistant professor at the University of Puerto Rico, where he also serves as director of the Zoology Museum. He continues to collaborate with the Smithsonian Institution.

Agnarsson is a member of five professional societies: the International Society of Arachnology, the American Arachnological Society, the Royal Entomological Society, the Society for the Study of Evolution, and the Society of Systematic Biologists.
