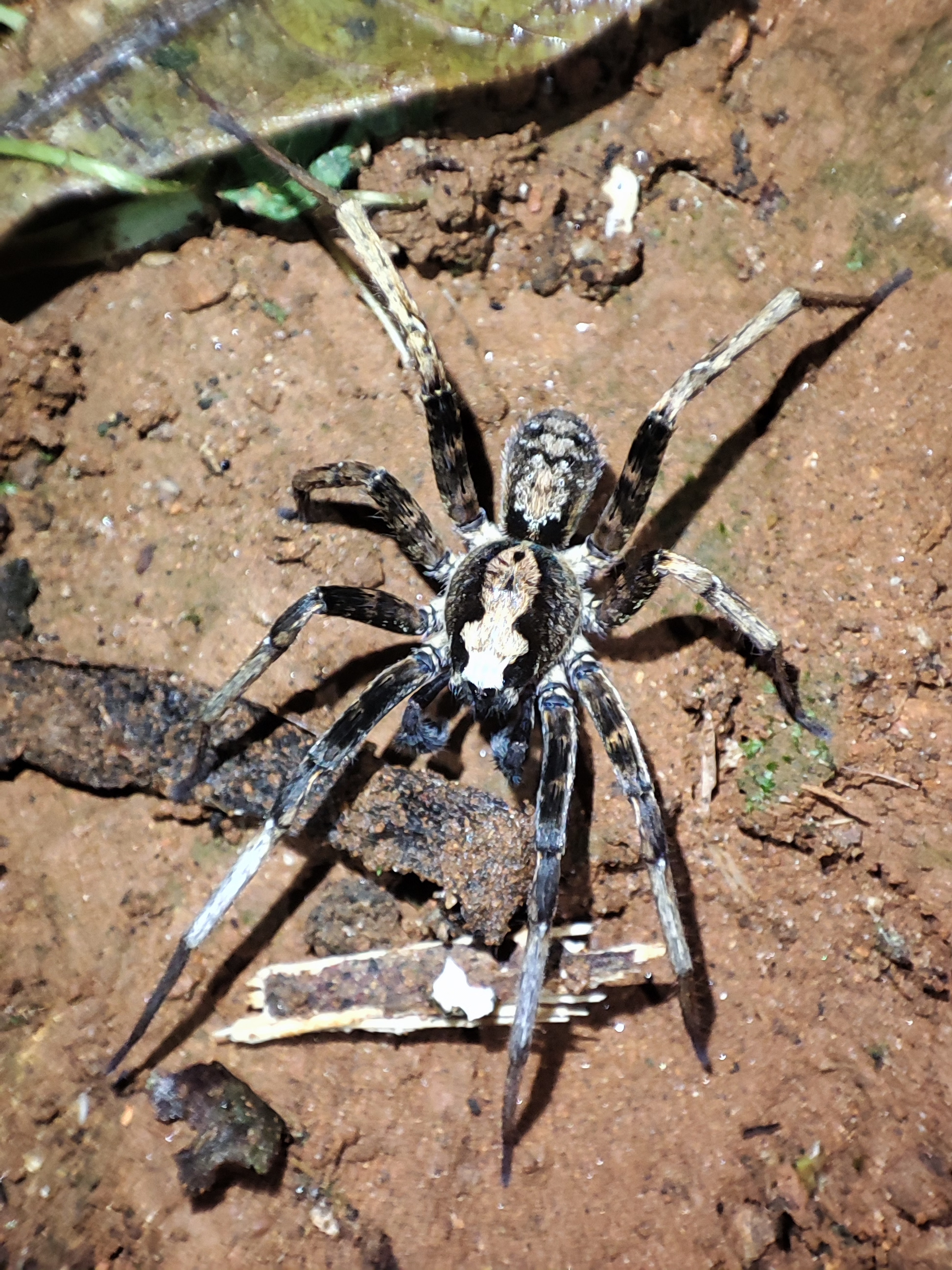
- Bowie sp. from the Western Ghats
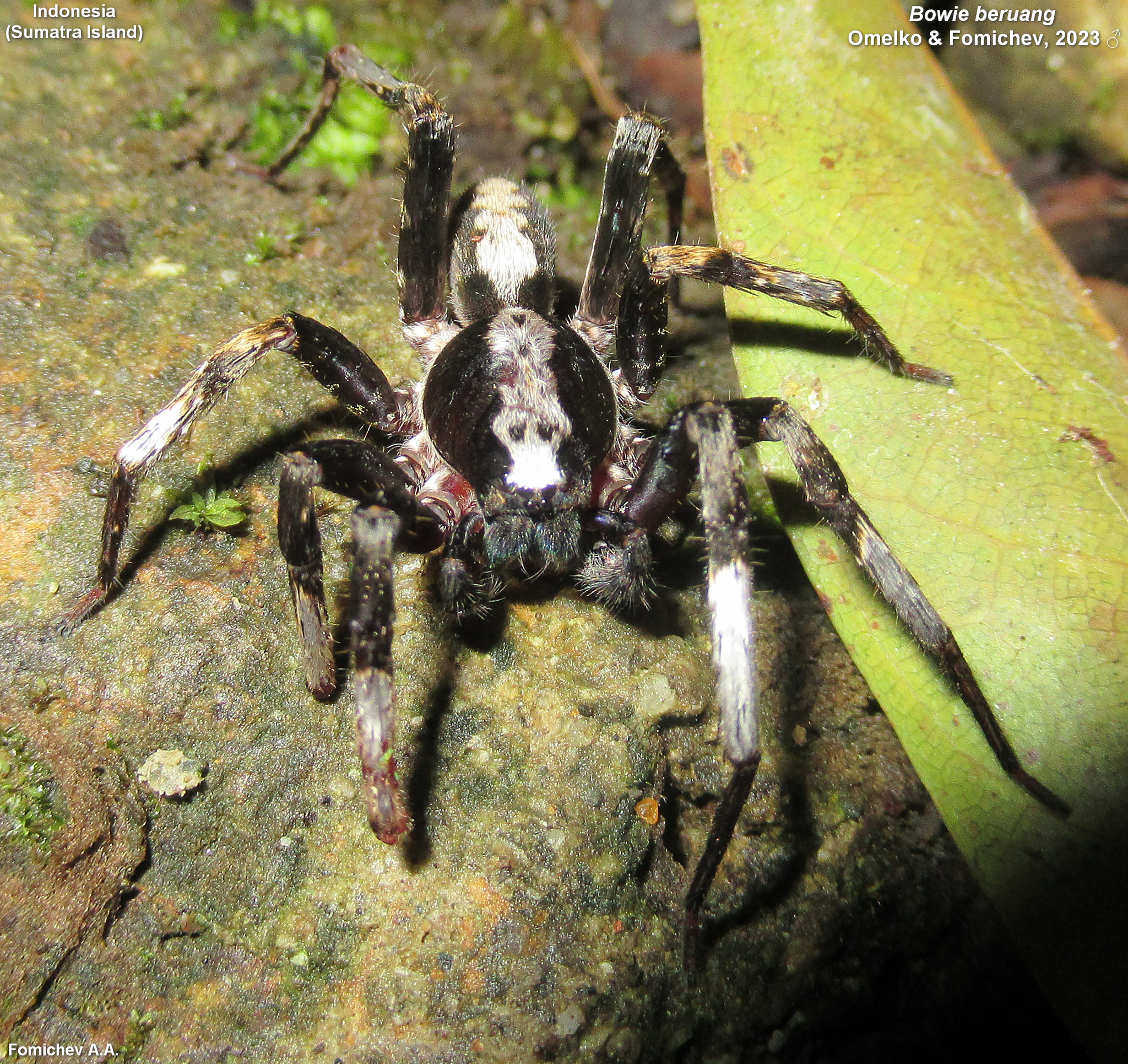
- B. beruang in Indonesia

Scientific classification
- Kingdom: Animalia
- Phylum: Arthropoda
- Subphylum: Chelicerata
- Class: Arachnida
- Order: Araneae
- Infraorder: Araneomorphae
- Family: Ctenidae
- Genus: Bowie; Jäger, 2022

Type species
- Bowie rebelrebel Jäger, 2022

Species
- 119, see text

= Bowie (spider) =

Genus of spiders

Bowie is a genus of Ctenidae that was described by Peter Jäger in 2022. The genus was named after the English singer-songwriter and actor David Bowie. It consists of more than a hundred described species, of which about half were named after elements from David Bowie's musical catalogue.

== Species ==
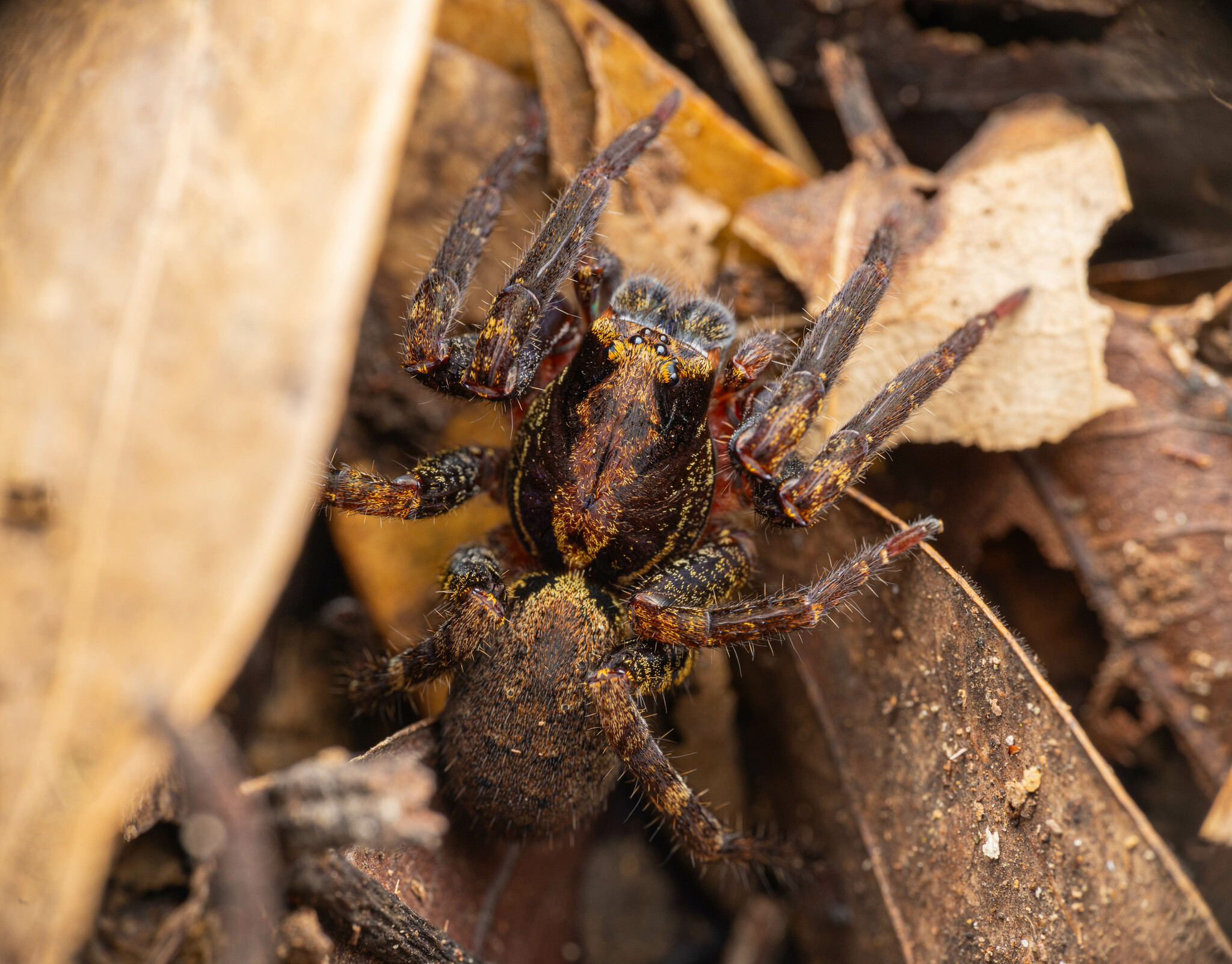
B. argentipes in Singapore

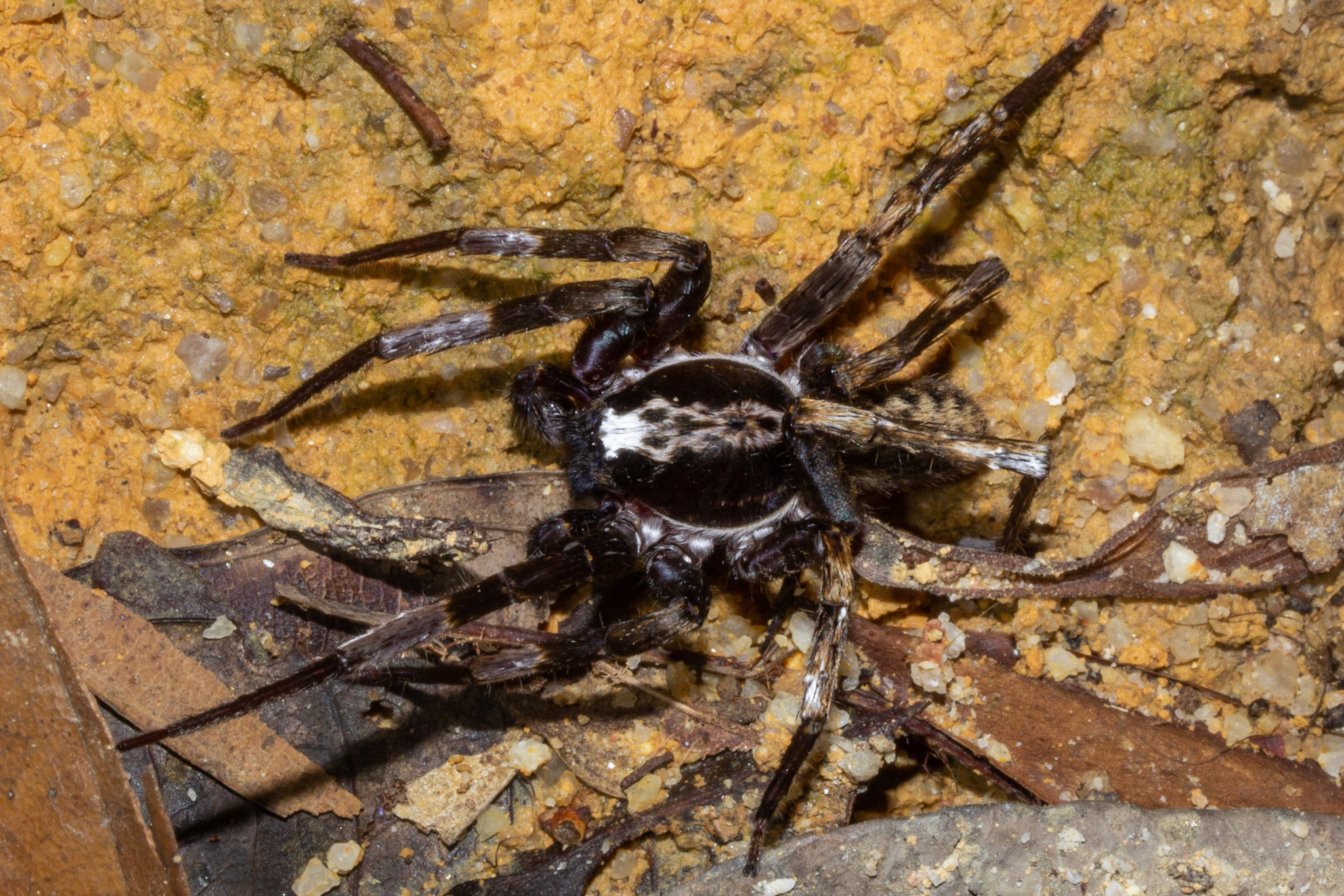
B. tonight in Malaysia

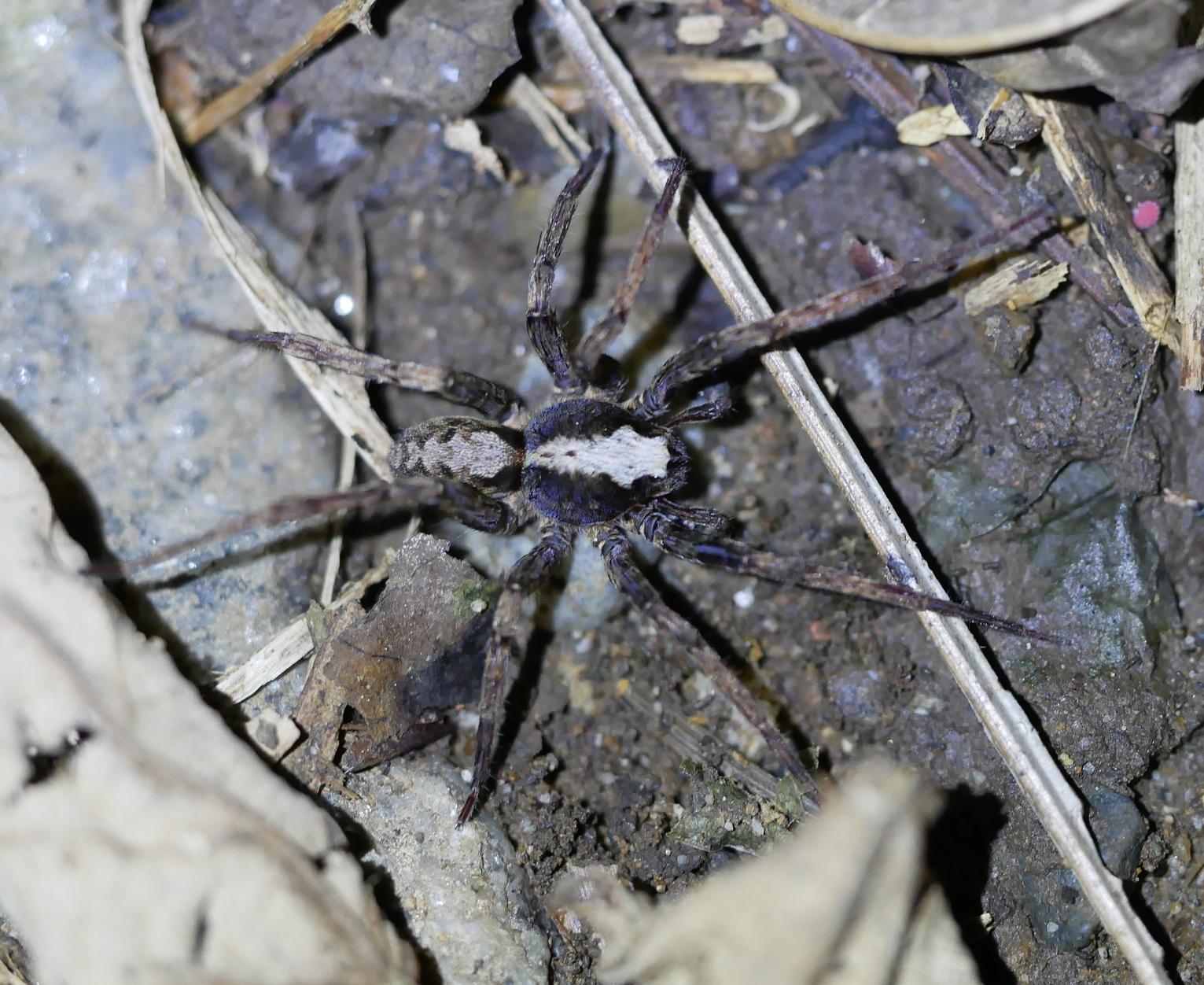
B. yaeyamensis in Taiwan

As of January 2026, this genus includes 119 species from the Himalayas to Papua New Guinea and northern Australia:

- Bowie abdulmajid Jäger, 2022 – Singapore
  - Named after the song "Abdulmajid"
- Bowie afterall Jäger, 2022 – Sri Lanka
  - Named after the song "After All"
- Bowie aladdinsane Jäger, 2022 – India
  - Named after the album Aladdin Sane and the song "Aladdin Sane (1913–1938–197?)"
- Bowie andamanensis (Graveley, 1931) – India (Andaman Is.)
- Bowie angigitanus (Roewer, 1938) – Papua New Guinea
- Bowie angularis (Roewer, 1938) – Indonesia (Aru Is.)
- Bowie argentipes (van Hasselt, 1893) – Malaysia (Peninsula), Singapore, Indonesia (Sumatra)
- Bowie artdecade Jäger, 2022 – Cambodia
  - Named after the song "Art Decade"
- Bowie aruanus (Strand, 1911) – Indonesia (Aru Is.)
- Bowie ashestoashes Jäger, 2022 – Indonesia (Borneo)
  - Named after the song "Ashes to Ashes"
- Bowie banna (Yao & Li, 2022) – China
- Bowie bantaengi (Merian, 1911) – Indonesia (Sulawesi)
- Bowie bayeri (Jäger, 2012) – Laos
- Bowie bemywife Jäger, 2022 – Thailand
  - Named after the song "Be My Wife"
- Bowie beruang Omelko & Fomichev, 2023 – Indonesia (Sumatra)
- Bowie bicostatus (Thorell, 1890) – Malaysia (Borneo)
- Bowie bigbrother Jäger, 2022 – Vietnam
  - Named after the song "Big Brother"
- Bowie binturong Omelko & Fomichev, 2023 – Indonesia (Sumatra)
- Bowie blackout Jäger, 2022 – Malaysia (Peninsula)
  - Named after the song "Blackout"
- Bowie blackstar Jäger, 2022 – Papua New Guinea
  - Named after the album Blackstar and the song "Blackstar"
- Bowie bluejean Jäger, 2022 – Malaysia (Borneo)
  - Named after the song "Blue Jean"
- Bowie bomdilaensis (Tikader & Malhotra, 1981) – India
- Bowie borneo Li & Yao, 2022 – Malaysia (Borneo)
- Bowie bowonglangi (Merian, 1911) – Indonesia (Sulawesi)
- Bowie candidate Jäger, 2022 – Vietnam
  - Named after the song "Candidate"
- Bowie catopuma Omelko & Fomichev, 2024 – Malaysia (Borneo)
- Bowie catpeople Jäger, 2022 – Malaysia (Borneo)
  - Named after the song "Cat People (Putting Out Fire)"
- Bowie celebensis (Pocock, 1897) – Indonesia (Sulawesi)
- Bowie ceylonensis (F. O. P-Cambridge, 1897) – Sri Lanka
- Bowie chinagirl Jäger, 2022 – Malaysia (Borneo)
  - Named after the song "China Girl"
- Bowie cladarus (Jäger, 2012) – Myanmar
- Bowie cochinensis (Gravely, 1931) – India
- Bowie corniger (F. O. Pickard-Cambridge, 1898) – South Africa (introduced?)
- Bowie criminalworld Jäger, 2022 – Malaysia (Borneo)
  - Named after the song "Criminal World" (Originally by Metro, covered by Bowie)
- Bowie crystaljapan Jäger, 2022 – Indonesia (Sumatra)
  - Named after the song "Crystal Japan"
- Bowie dhole Omelko & Fomichev, 2023 – Indonesia (Sumatra)
- Bowie diamonddogs Jäger, 2022 – Vietnam
  - Named after the album Diamond Dogs and the song "Diamond Dogs"
- Bowie dodo Jäger, 2022 – Vietnam
  - Named after the song "Dodo"
- Bowie engkilili Li & Yao, 2022 – Malaysia (Borneo)
- Bowie fame Jäger, 2022 – Vietnam
  - Named after the song "Fame"
- Bowie fascination Jäger, 2022 – Vietnam
  - Named after the song "Fascination"
- Bowie fashion Jäger, 2022 – Malaysia (Peninsula)
  - Named after the song "Fashion"
- Bowie floweri (F. O. Pickard-Cambridge, 1897) – Malaysia (Peninsula)
- Bowie fungifer (Thorell, 1890) – Malaysia (Peninsula)
- Bowie giang Logunov, 2024 – Vietnam
- Bowie haiphong Yao & Li, 2022 – Vietnam
- Bowie heroes Jäger, 2022 – India
  - Named after the song "Heroes"
- Bowie himalayensis (Gravely, 1931) – India
- Bowie holthoffi (Jäger, 2012) – Laos
- Bowie hosei (F. O. Pickard-Cambridge, 1897) – Borneo (Malaysia, Brunei)
- Bowie hunkydory Jäger, 2022 – Nepal
  - Named after the album Hunky Dory
- Bowie indicus (Gravely, 1931) – India
- Bowie javanus (Pocock, 1897) – Indonesia (Sumatra, Java, Bali)
- Bowie jeangenie Jäger, 2022 – India
  - Named after the song "The Jean Genie"
- Bowie joethelion Jäger, 2022 – Malaysia (Peninsula)
  - Named after the song "Joe the Lion"
- Bowie kapuri (Tikader, 1973) – India (Andaman Is.)
- Bowie kochi (Simon, 1897) – Indonesia (New Guinea)
- Bowie ladystardust Jäger, 2022 – Nepal
  - Named after the song "Lady Stardust"
- Bowie lazarus Jäger, 2022 – Papua New Guinea
  - Named after the song "Lazarus" and the musical Lazarus
- Bowie letsdance Jäger, 2022 – Indonesia (Java)
  - Named after the song Let's Dance"
- Bowie lishuqiang (Jäger, 2012) – China
  - Named after arachnologist Shuqiang Li
- Bowie lodger Jäger, 2022 – Philippines
  - Named after the album Lodger
- Bowie low Jäger, 2022 – Thailand
  - Named after the album Low
- Bowie magicdance Jäger, 2022 – Indonesia (Sulawesi)
  - Named after the song "Magic Dance"
- Bowie majortom Jäger, 2022 – Nepal
  - Named after the character Major Tom
- Bowie martensi (Jäger, 2012) – Nepal
  - Named after zoologist Jochen Martens
- Bowie meghalayaensis (Tikader, 1976) – India
- Bowie mengla Yao & Li, 2022 – China
- Bowie modernlove Jäger, 2022 – Malaysia (Borneo)
  - Named after the song "Modern Love"
- Bowie monaghani (Jäger, 2013) – Laos
  - Named after actor Dominic Monaghan
- Bowie mossgarden Jäger, 2022 – Malaysia (Peninsula)
  - Named after the song "Moss Garden"
- Bowie musang Omelko & Fomichev, 2024 – Philippines (Mindanao)
- Bowie narashinhai (Patel & Reddy, 1988) – India
- Bowie natmataung (Jäger & Minn, 2015) – Myanmar
- Bowie neukoeln Jäger, 2022 – Malaysia (Peninsula)
  - Named after the song "Neuköln"
- Bowie ninhbinh Li & Yao, 2022 – Vietnam
- Bowie palembangensis (Strand, 1906) – Indonesia (Sumatra)
- Bowie philippinensis (F. O. Pickard-Cambridge, 1897) – Philippines
- Bowie pingu (Jäger & Minn, 2015) – Myanmar
- Bowie pulvinatus (Thorell, 1890) – Malaysia (Borneo)
- Bowie ramosus (Thorell, 1887) – Myanmar
- Bowie rebelrebel Jäger, 2022 – Vietnam
  - Named after the song "Rebel Rebel"
- Bowie redsails Jäger, 2022 – Philippines
  - Named after the song "Red Sails"
- Bowie ricochet Jäger, 2022 – Indonesia (Borneo)
  - Named after the song "Ricochet"
- Bowie right Jäger, 2022 – Vietnam
  - Named after the song "Right"
- Bowie robustus (Thorell, 1897) – Myanmar, Thailand, Laos, China
- Bowie rotundus Wang, Irfan, F. Zhang & Z. S. Zhang, 2024 – China
- Bowie rufisternis (Pocock, 1898) – Papua New Guinea (New Britain)
- Bowie sabah Li & Yao, 2022 – Malaysia (Borneo)
- Bowie saci (Ono, 2010) – Vietnam
- Bowie sagittatus (Giltay, 1935) – Indonesia (Sulawesi)
- Bowie sarawakensis (F. O. Pickard-Cambridge, 1897) – Borneo (Malaysia, Brunei)
- Bowie scarymonsters Jäger, 2022 – Indonesia (Sumatra)
  - Named after the album Scary Monsters and the song "Scary Monsters (and Super Creeps)"
- Bowie shakeit Jäger, 2022 – Malaysia (Borneo)
  - Named after the song "Shake It"
- Bowie sikkimensis (Gravely, 1931) – India
- Bowie simplex (Thorell, 1897) – Myanmar, Thailand, Laos
- Bowie stationtostation Jäger, 2022 – Myanmar
  - Named after the album Station to Station and the song "Station to Station"
- Bowie stay Jäger, 2022 – Vietnam
  - Named after the song "Stay"
- Bowie subterraneans Jäger, 2022 – Thailand
  - Named after the song "Subterraneans"
- Bowie tangalunga Omelko & Fomichev, 2024 – Philippines (Mindanao)
- Bowie teenagewildlife Jäger, 2022 – Indonesia (Sumatra)
  - Named after the song "Teenage Wildlife"
- Bowie thenextday Jäger, 2022 – Indonesia (New Guinea)
  - Named after the album The Next Day and the song "The Next Day"
- Bowie theodorianum (Jäger, 2012) – Thailand, Laos, Vietnam
  - Named after Gymnasium Theodorianum
- Bowie thiesi Jäger, 2022 – Papua New Guinea
- Bowie thorelli (F. O. Pickard-Cambridge, 1897) – Sri Lanka
- Bowie tonight Jäger, 2022 – Malaysia (Borneo)
  - Named after the song "Tonight"
- Bowie underground Jäger, 2022 – Malaysia (Borneo)
  - Named after the song "Underground"
- Bowie valvularis (van Hasselt, 1882) – Indonesia (Java, Sumatra)
- Bowie vinhphuc Li & Yao, 2022 – Vietnam
- Bowie warszawa Jäger, 2022 – Thailand
  - Named after the song "Warszawa"
- Bowie win Jäger, 2022 – Vietnam
  - Named after the song "Win"
- Bowie withinyou Jäger, 2022 – Malaysia (Borneo)
  - Named after the song "Within You"
- Bowie withoutyou Jäger, 2022 – Malaysia (Borneo)
  - Named after the song "Without You"
- Bowie yaeyamensis (Yoshida, 1998) – Japan (Ryukyu Is.), Taiwan
- Bowie yassassin Jäger, 2022 – Taiwan
  - Named after the song "Yassassin"
- Bowie youngamericans Jäger, 2022 – Vietnam
  - Named after the album Young Americans and the song "Young Americans"
- Bowie yulin (Yao & Li, 2022) – China
- Bowie zhengi Yao & Li, 2022 – China
- Bowie ziggystardust Jäger, 2022 – Nepal
  - Named after the character Ziggy Stardust

== See also ==
- Giant Laotian harvestman
- Heteropoda davidbowie
- Spintharus davidbowiei
- List of organisms named after famous people (born 1925–1949)
