= Spintharus berniesandersi =

Scientific classification
- Kingdom: Animalia
- Phylum: Arthropoda
- Subphylum: Chelicerata
- Class: Arachnida
- Order: Araneae
- Infraorder: Araneomorphae
- Family: Theridiidae
- Genus: Spintharus
- Species: S. berniesandersi

Binomial name
- Spintharus berniesandersi Agnarsson & Sargeant, 2018

Species of arachnid

Spintharus berniesandersi is a species of Spintharus ("smiley-faced spiders") in the family Theridiidae. It is endemic to Cuba. It was described in 2018 by Ingi Agnarsson and Lily Sargeant of the University of Vermont in a revision of the genus by Agnarsson and colleagues. S. berniesandersi was discovered alongside 14 other species of smiley-faced spiders. This revision is in contrast to Herbert Walter Levi's taxonomy, which considered it to be intraspecific variation within Spintharus flavidus.

== Distribution ==
The specimens mentioned in the original species description all came from Cuba. The holotype was collected in La Mensura-Pilotos National Park near Mayarí, Holguín Province. Additional specimens were collected from El Yunque Mountain, near Baracoa, Guantánamo Province and Gran Piedra, Santiago de Cuba Province.

== Description ==
The species has a lemon-yellow colour and the female abdomen lacks humps and is nearly oval. On the spider's back is an ornate pattern halfway between a distorted smiley face and grimace.

=== Measurements ===
The male's total length is 2.47–2.66 mm, with a cephalothorax length of 0.74–0.98 mm and femur I length of 1.23–1.90 mm. The female's total length is 2.89–2.40 mm, with a cephalothorax length of 0.91–0.80 mm and a femur I length of 1.75–1.44 mm.

== Genetics ==
Part of the diagnosis of S. berniesandersi includes the combination of four specific mitochondrial DNA nucleotide substitutions.

== Etymology ==
The specific name honors Vermont senator Bernie Sanders, whom the authors describe as "a tireless fighter for human rights and equality, and environmentally aware social democracy". Due to its name, this species received media attention.

== See also ==
- List of organisms named after famous people (born 1925–1949)
