= Bowie afterall =

Scientific classification
- Kingdom: Animalia
- Phylum: Arthropoda
- Subphylum: Chelicerata
- Class: Arachnida
- Order: Araneae
- Infraorder: Araneomorphae
- Family: Ctenidae
- Genus: Bowie
- Species: B. afterall

Binomial name
- Bowie afterall Jäger, 2022

Species of spider

Bowie afterall is a species of spider of the genus Bowie. It is endemic to Sri Lanka.

It was first described by German arachnologist Peter Jäger in 2022. It is named after David Bowie's song "After All".
