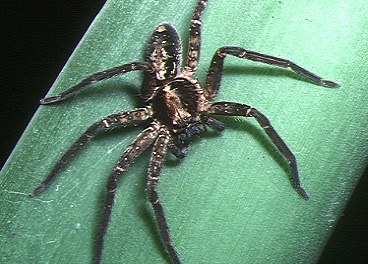
- Female Sinopoda okinawana in Okinawa, Japan

Scientific classification
- Kingdom: Animalia
- Phylum: Arthropoda
- Subphylum: Chelicerata
- Class: Arachnida
- Order: Araneae
- Infraorder: Araneomorphae
- Family: Sparassidae
- Genus: Sinopoda
- Species: S. okinawana

Binomial name
- Sinopoda okinawana Jäger & Ono, 2000

= Sinopoda okinawana =

Species of spider

Sinopoda okinawana is a species of huntsman spider found in the Ryukyu Islands of Japan. It was first described by Peter Jäger and Hirotsugu Ono in 2000.

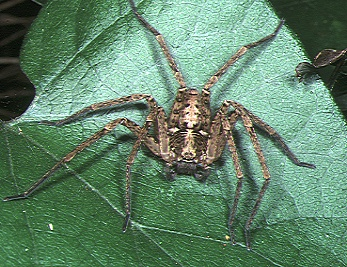
Male S. okinawana in Okinawa, Japan
