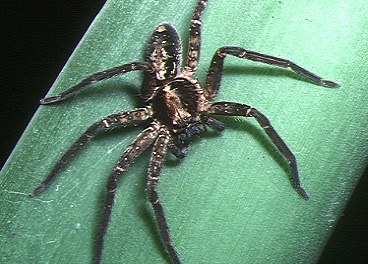
- Female Sinopoda okinawana
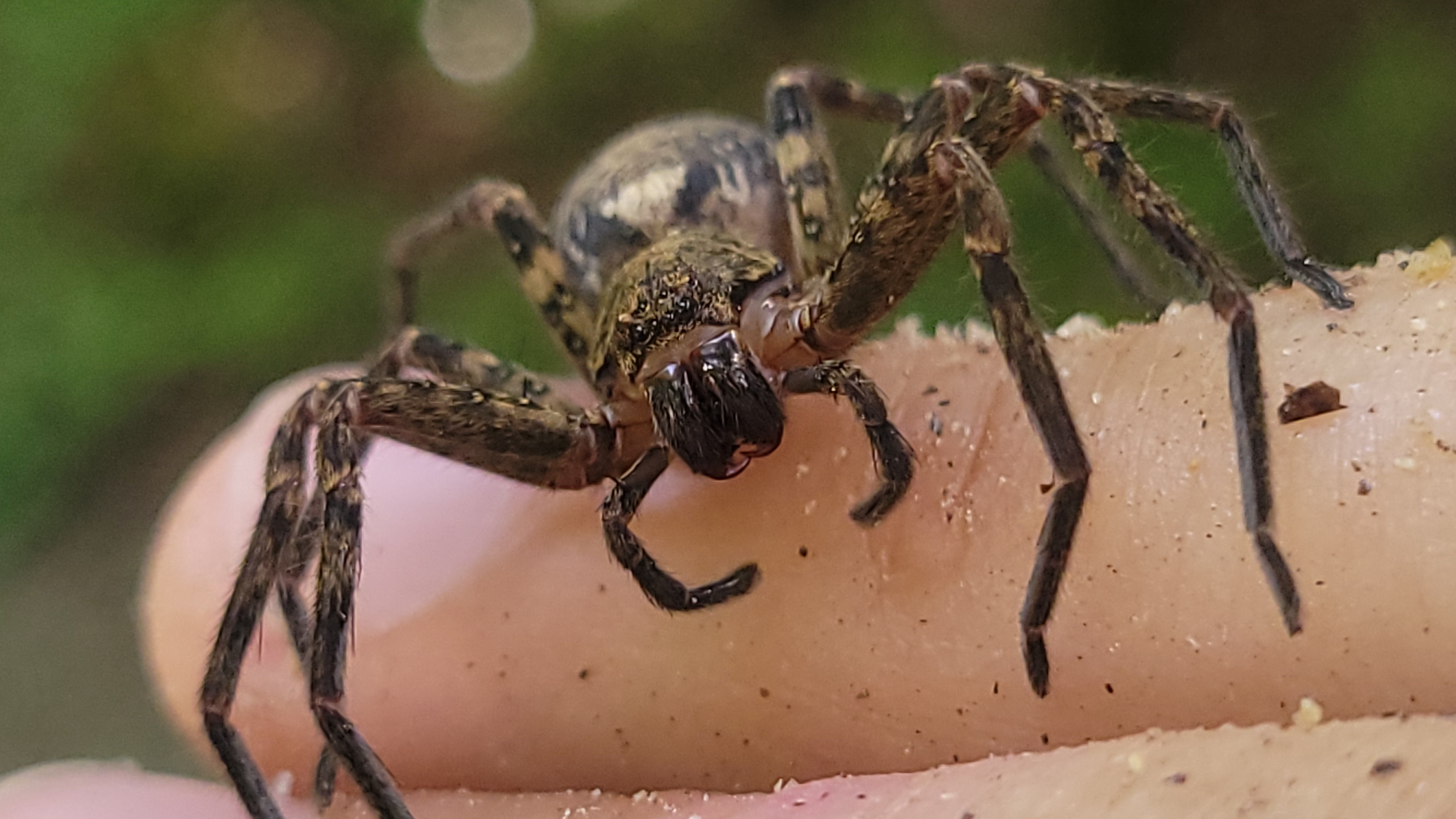
- A large Sinopoda forcipata resting on a human finger.

Scientific classification
- Kingdom: Animalia
- Phylum: Arthropoda
- Subphylum: Chelicerata
- Class: Arachnida
- Order: Araneae
- Infraorder: Araneomorphae
- Family: Sparassidae
- Genus: Sinopoda; Jäger, 1999

Type species
- S. forcipata (Karsch, 1881)

Species
- See text.

= Sinopoda =

Genus of spiders

Sinopoda is a genus of East Asian huntsman spider family Sparassidae. It was first described by Peter Jäger, a German arachnologist, in 1999.

== Distribution ==
Sinopoda is primarily distributed throughout Eastern Asia, with the largest concentration of species found in China. Only one species has been described outside of the region in India.

== Taxonomy ==
=== Species ===
As of May 2026 the World Spider Catalog accepted the following species, found in Asia:

- S. abstrusa Zhong, Jäger, Chen & Liu, 2019 – China
- S. aenyk Grall & Jäger, 2020 – Laos
- S. aequalis Zhong, Jäger, Chen & Liu, 2019 – China
- S. afflata Zhong, Cao & Liu, 2017 – China
- S. albofasciata Jäger & Ono, 2002 – Japan (Ryukyu Is.)
- S. altissima (Hu & Li, 1987) – China
- S. anguina Liu, Li & Jäger, 2008 – China
- S. angulata Jäger, Gao & Fei, 2002 – China
- S. apiculiformis Zhong, Jäger, Chen & Liu, 2019 – China
- S. arboricola Grall & Jäger, 2020 – Malaysia (Borneo)
- S. assamensis Grall & Jäger, 2020 – India
- S. aureola Kim, Lee & Lee, 2014 – Korea
- S. bifurca Grall & Jäger, 2020 – China
- S. bigibba (Chae, Lee & Kim, 2022) – Korea
- S. biguttata Lee, Lee & Kim, 2016 – Korea
- S. bispina Grall & Jäger, 2020 – Myanmar
- S. bogil (Chae, Lee & Kim, 2022) – Korea
- S. brevis Zhong, Jäger, Chen & Liu, 2019 – China
- S. caeca Grall & Jäger, 2020 – Laos
- S. campanacea (Wang, 1990) – China
- S. chiangmaiensis Grall & Jäger, 2020 – Thailand
- S. chongan Xu, Yin & Peng, 2000 – China
- S. cochlearia Zhang, Zhang & Zhang, 2015 – China
- S. columnaris Zhong, Jäger, Chen & Liu, 2019 – China
- S. cornuta Grall & Jäger, 2020 – Indonesia (Sulawesi)
- S. crassa Liu, Li & Jäger, 2008 – China
- S. curva Zhong, Jäger, Chen & Liu, 2019 – China
- S. dasani Kim, Lee, Lee & Hong, 2015 – Korea
- S. dashahe Zhu, Zhang, Zhang & Chen, 2005 – China
- S. dayong (Bao, Yin & Yan, 2000) – China
- S. dehiscens Zhong, Jäger, Chen & Liu, 2019 – China
- S. deminutiva Grall & Jäger, 2020 – Laos
- S. derivata Jäger & Ono, 2002 – Japan
- S. emei Grall & Jäger, 2020 – China
- S. empat Grall & Jäger, 2020 – Malaysia (Peninsula)
- S. erromena Zhong, Jäger, Chen & Liu, 2019 – China
- S. exspectata Jäger & Ono, 2001 – Taiwan
- S. fasciculata Jäger, Gao & Fei, 2002 – China
- S. flexura Grall & Jäger, 2020 – Laos or Cambodia or Vietnam
- S. forcipata (Karsch, 1881) (type) – China, Korea, Japan
- S. fornicata Liu, Li & Jäger, 2008 – China
- S. globosa Zhang, Zhang & Zhang, 2015 – China
- S. grandispinosa Liu, Li & Jäger, 2008 – China
- S. guangyuanensis Zhong, Jäger, Chen & Liu, 2018 – China
- S. guap Jäger, 2012 – Laos
- S. guiyang Zhang, Yu & Zhong, 2023 – China
- S. hainan Grall & Jäger, 2020 – China (Hainan)
- S. hamata (Fox, 1937) – China
- S. hanya Grall & Jäger, 2020 – Malaysia (Borneo)
- S. helii Wang & Li, 2021 – China
- S. himalayica (Hu & Li, 1987) – China
- S. hongruii Wang & Li, 2021 – China
- S. horizontalis Zhong, Cao & Liu, 2017 – China
- S. improcera Zhong, Jäger, Chen & Liu, 2019 – China
- S. insicura Grall & Jäger, 2020 – China
- S. inthanon Grall & Jäger, 2020 – Thailand
- S. jiangzhou Wang & Li, 2021 – China
- S. jirisanensis (Kim & Chae, 2013) – Korea
- S. kalaw Grall & Jäger, 2020 – Myanmar
- S. kambaiti Grall & Jäger, 2020 – Myanmar
- S. kamouk Grall & Jäger, 2020 – Laos
- S. kieo Grall & Jäger, 2020 – Laos
- S. kinabalu Grall & Jäger, 2020 – Malaysia (Borneo)
- S. konglor Grall & Jäger, 2020 – Laos
- S. koreana (Paik, 1968) – Korea, Japan
- S. kyee Grall & Jäger, 2020 – Myanmar
- S. lata Zhong, Jäger, Chen & Liu, 2019 – China
- S. lebar Grall & Jäger, 2020 – Indonesia (Sulawesi)
- S. licenti (Schenkel, 1953) – China
- S. liui Zhong, Cao & Liu, 2017 – China
- S. longicymbialis Grall & Jäger, 2020 – Thailand
- S. longiducta Zhang, Zhang & Zhang, 2015 – China
- S. longshan Yin, Peng, Yan & Bao, 2000 – China
- S. lot Grall & Jäger, 2020 – Thailand
- S. luyui Zhong, Jäger, Chen & Liu, 2019 – China
- S. maculata Grall & Jäger, 2020 – Malaysia (Borneo)
- S. mamillata Zhong, Cao & Liu, 2017 – China
- S. mat Grall & Jäger, 2020 – Vietnam
- S. matang Grall & Jäger, 2020 – Malaysia (Borneo)
- S. mi Chen & Zhu, 2009 – China
- S. microphthalma (Fage, 1929) – Malaysia
- S. minschana (Schenkel, 1936) – China
- S. muyuensis (Zhong, Zeng, Gu, Yu & Yang, 2022) – China
- S. nanphagu Grall & Jäger, 2020 – Myanmar
- S. nigrobrunnea Lee, Lee & Kim, 2016 – Korea
- S. nuda Liu, Li & Jäger, 2008 – China
- S. ogatai Jäger & Ono, 2002 – Japan
- S. okinawana Jäger & Ono, 2000 – Japan (Ryukyu Is.)
- S. ovata Zhong, Jäger, Chen & Liu, 2019 – China
- S. pantherina (Chae, Lee & Kim, 2022) – Korea
- S. parva Grall & Jäger, 2020 – Malaysia (Peninsula)
- S. peet Jäger, 2012 – Laos
- S. pengi Song & Zhu, 1999 – China
- S. phathai Grall & Jäger, 2020 – Thailand
- S. phiset Grall & Jäger, 2020 – Thailand
- S. phom Grall & Jäger, 2020 – Thailand
- S. pyramidalis Zhong, Jäger, Chen & Liu, 2019 – China
- S. reinholdae Grall & Jäger, 2020 – Malaysia (Borneo)
- S. rotunda Grall & Jäger, 2020 – China
- S. ruam Grall & Jäger, 2020 – Thailand
- S. saiyok Wang & Li, 2021 – Thailand
- S. scurion Jäger, 2012 – Laos
- S. semicirculata Liu, Li & Jäger, 2008 – China
- S. separata Zhong, Cao & Liu, 2017 – China
- S. serpentembolus Zhang, Zhu, Jäger & Song, 2007 – China
- S. serrata (Wang, 1990) – China
- S. shennonga (Peng, Yin & Kim, 1996) – China
- S. silvicola Grall & Jäger, 2020 – China
- S. sitkao Jäger, 2012 – Laos
- S. soong Jäger, 2012 – Laos
- S. steineri Jäger, 2012 – Laos
- S. stellata (Schenkel, 1963) – China
- S. stellatops Jäger & Ono, 2002 – Korea, Japan
- S. suang Jäger, 2012 – Laos
- S. subcampanacea R. Zhang, B. S. Zhang & F. Zhang, 2023 – China
- S. sulawesia Grall & Jäger, 2020 – Indonesia (Sulawesi)
- S. taa Jäger, 2012 – Laos
- S. tanikawai Jäger & Ono, 2000 – Japan
- S. tawau Grall & Jäger, 2020 – Malaysia (Borneo)
- S. tengchongensis Fu & Zhu, 2008 – China
- S. tham Jäger, 2012 – Laos
- S. thieu Grall & Jäger, 2020 – Vietnam
- S. tibang Grall & Jäger, 2020 – Indonesia (Borneo)
- S. tilmanni Grall & Jäger, 2020 – Malaysia (Peninsula)
- S. tralinh Grall & Jäger, 2020 – Vietnam
- S. triangula Liu, Li & Jäger, 2008 – China
- S. tuber Grall & Jäger, 2020 – Borneo (Malaysia, Brunei)
- S. tumefacta Zhong, Jäger, Chen & Liu, 2019 – China
- S. undata Liu, Li & Jäger, 2008 – China
- S. unicolor Grall & Jäger, 2020 – Thailand
- S. wangi Song & Zhu, 1999 – China
- S. wayala Grall & Jäger, 2020 – China
- S. wuyiensis Liu, 2021 – China
- S. xieae Peng & Yin, 2001 – China
- S. xishui Zhang, Yu & Zhong, 2023 – China
- S. yaanensis Zhong, Jäger, Chen & Liu, 2019 – China
- S. yanjin Wang & Li, 2021 – China
- S. yanlingensis Zhong, Jäger, Chen & Liu, 2019 – China
- S. yanzi Wang & Li, 2021 – China
- S. yaojingensis Liu, Li & Jäger, 2008 – China
- S. yichangensis Zhu, Zhong & Yang, 2020 – China
