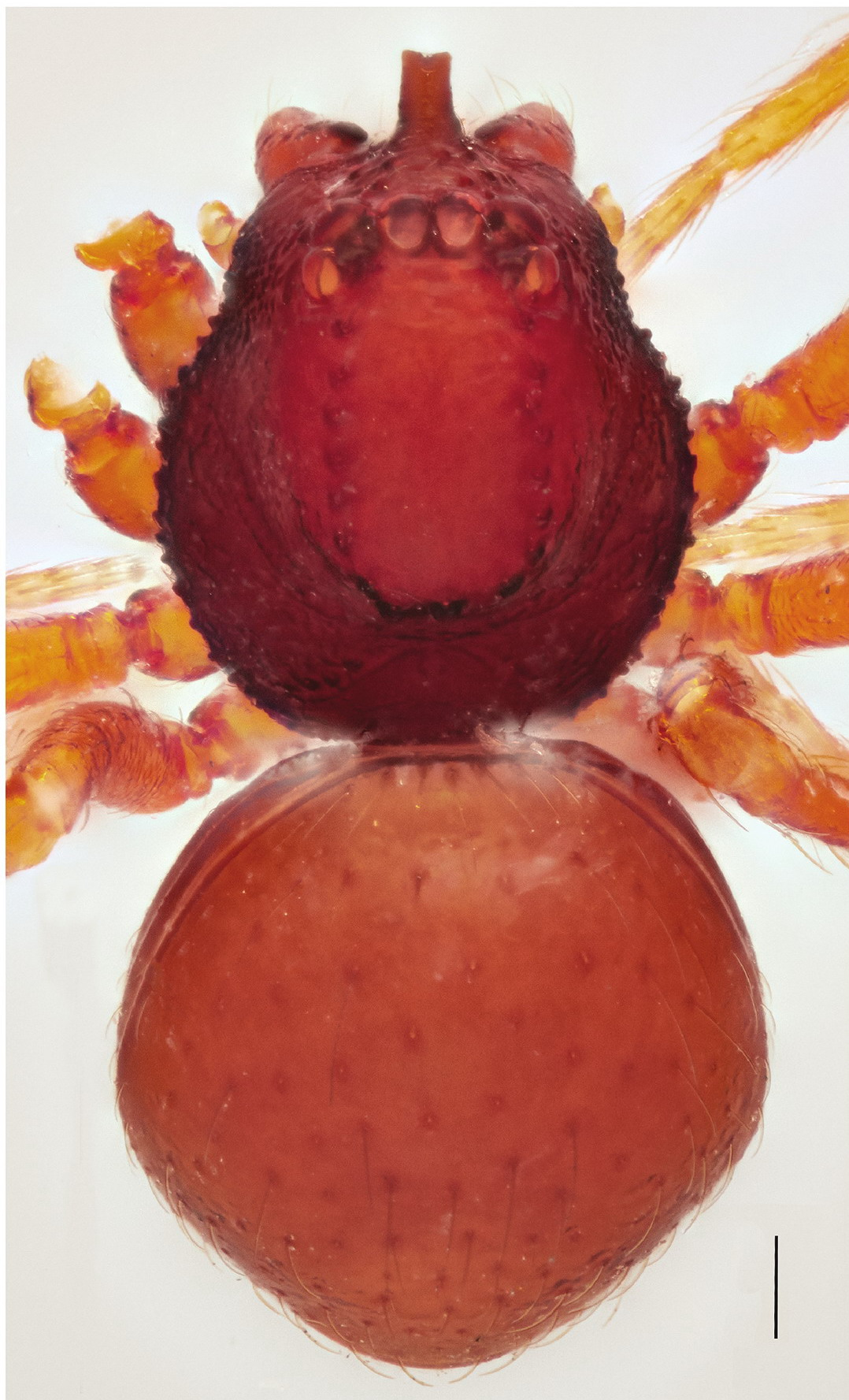
- B. patmae, male

Scientific classification
- Kingdom: Animalia
- Phylum: Arthropoda
- Subphylum: Chelicerata
- Class: Arachnida
- Order: Araneae
- Infraorder: Araneomorphae
- Family: Tetrablemmidae
- Genus: Brignoliella; Shear, 1978

Type species
- B. acuminata (Simon, 1889)

Species
- 24, see text

= Brignoliella =

Genus of spiders

Brignoliella is a genus of araneomorph spiders in the family Tetrablemmidae that was first described by W. A. Shear in 1978.

== Species ==
As of September 2019 it contains twenty-four species, found in Asia, on Fiji, in Papua New Guinea, Kiribati, and on New Caledonia:

- Brignoliella acuminata (Simon, 1889) (type) – New Caledonia
- Brignoliella beattyi Shear, 1978 – Caroline Is.
- Brignoliella besuchetiana Bourne, 1980 – India
- Brignoliella besutensis Lin, Li & Jäger, 2012 – Malaysia, SIngapore
- Brignoliella bicornis (Simon, 1893) – Philippines
- Brignoliella caligiformis Tong & Li, 2008 – China
- Brignoliella carmen Lehtinen, 1981 – Philippines
- Brignoliella dankobiensis Bourne, 1980 – Papua New Guinea (New Ireland)
- Brignoliella delphina Deeleman-Reinhold, 1980 – New Guinea
- Brignoliella klabati Lehtinen, 1981 – Indonesia (Sulawesi)
- Brignoliella leletina Bourne, 1980 – Papua New Guinea (New Ireland)
- Brignoliella maoganensis Tong & Li, 2008 – China
- Brignoliella maros Lehtinen, 1981 – Indonesia (Sulawesi)
- Brignoliella martensi (Brignoli, 1972) – Nepal
- Brignoliella massai Lehtinen, 1981 – Indonesia (Sulawesi)
- Brignoliella michaeli Lehtinen, 1981 – Malaysia, Singapore
- Brignoliella patmae Fardiansah & Dupérré, 2019 – Indonesia (Sumatra)
- Brignoliella quadricornis (Roewer, 1963) – Caroline Is.
- Brignoliella ratnapura Shear, 1988 – Sri Lanka
- Brignoliella sarawak Shear, 1978 – Borneo
- Brignoliella scrobiculata (Simon, 1893) – Sri Lanka
- Brignoliella trifida Lehtinen, 1981 – Borneo
- Brignoliella vitiensis Lehtinen, 1981 – Fiji
- Brignoliella vulgaris Lehtinen, 1981 – Borneo
