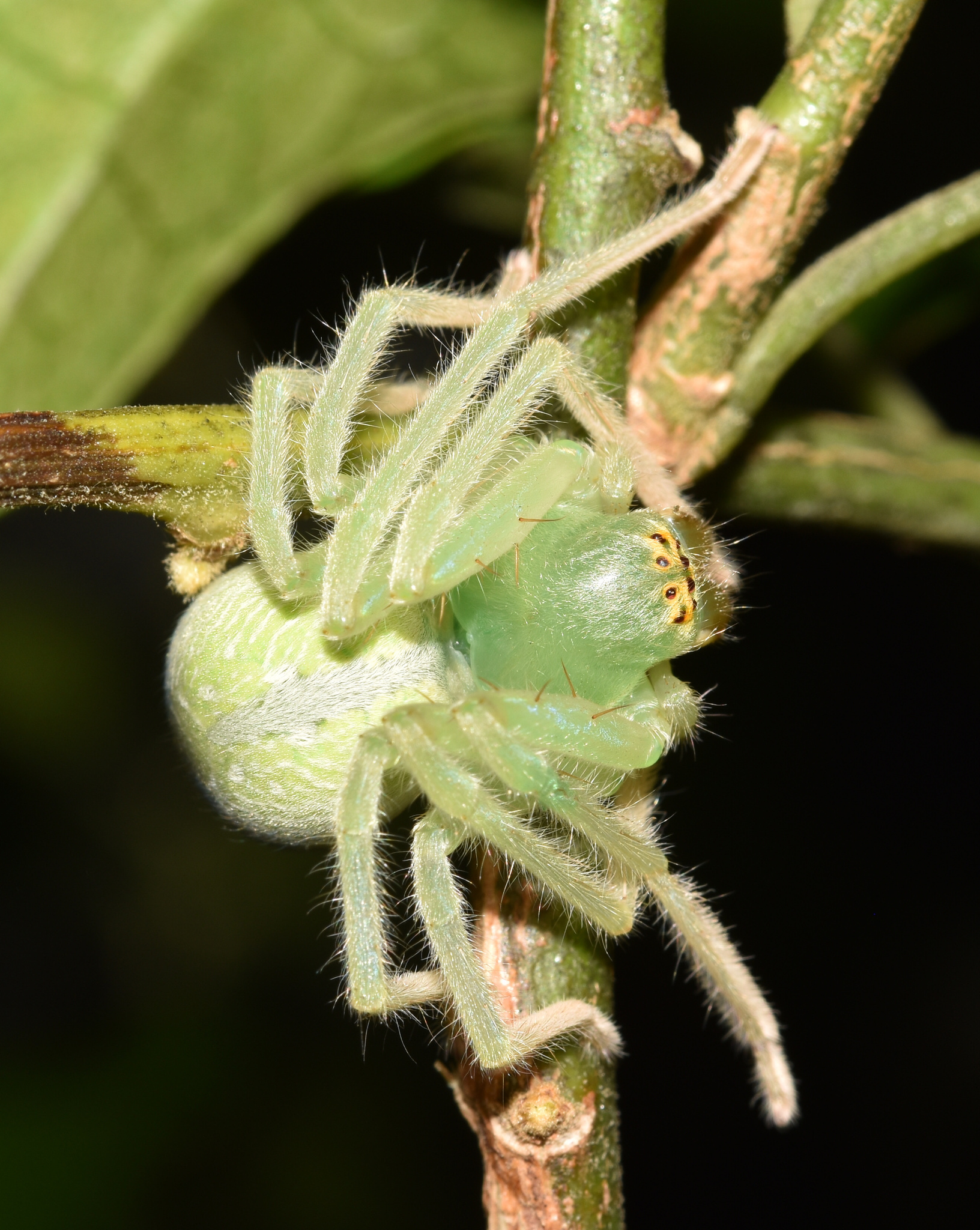

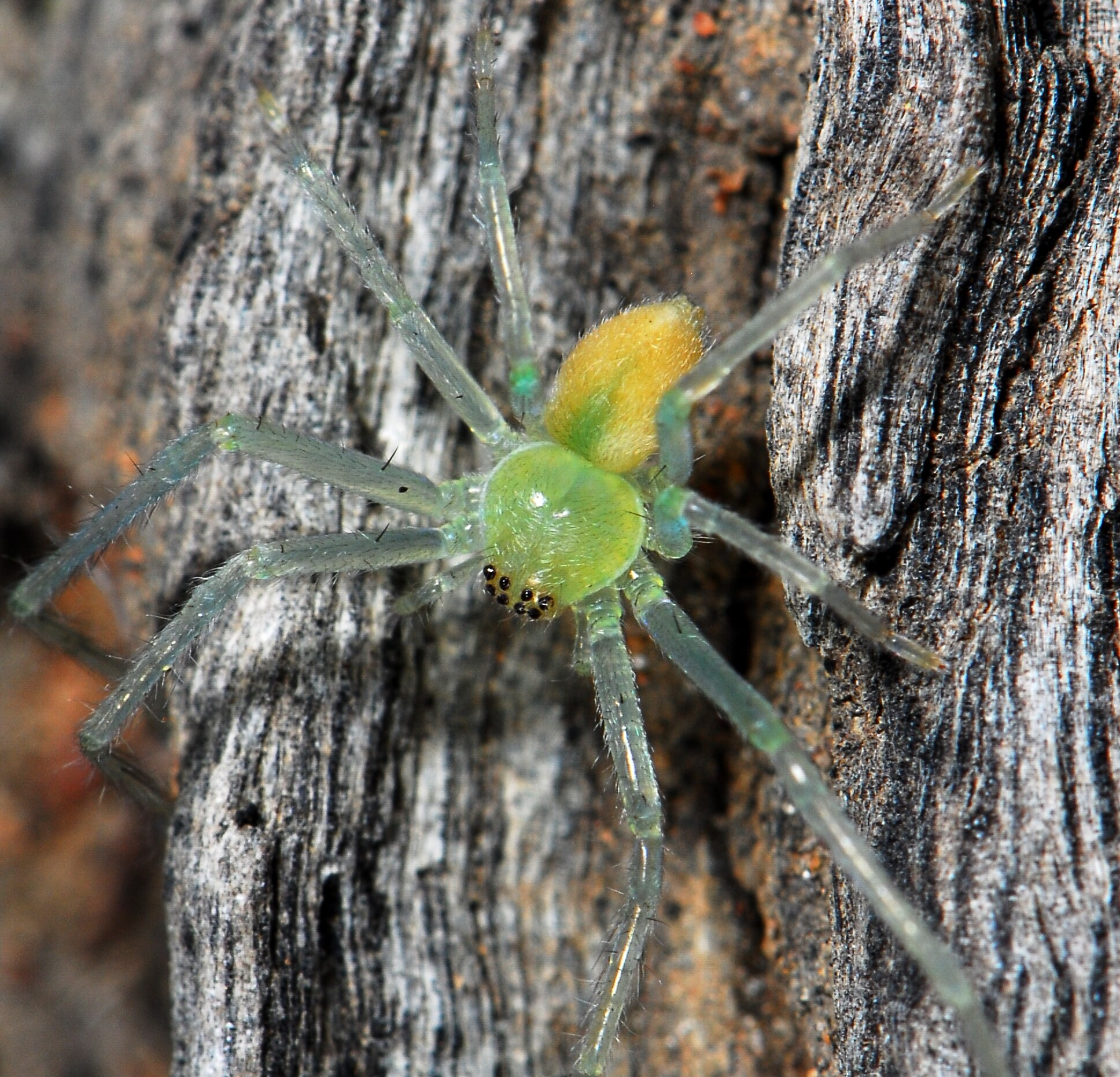
- juvenile female

Scientific classification
- Kingdom: Animalia
- Phylum: Arthropoda
- Subphylum: Chelicerata
- Class: Arachnida
- Order: Araneae
- Infraorder: Araneomorphae
- Family: Sparassidae
- Genus: Olios
- Species: O. auricomis

Binomial name
- Olios auricomis (Simon, 1880)

Synonyms
- Midamus auricomis Simon, 1880; Sparassus schönlandi Pocock, 1900; Sparassus rufilatus Pocock, 1900; Eusparassus chiracanthiformis Strand, 1906; Olios ituricus Strand, 1913; Olios isongonis Strand, 1915; Olios pacifer Lessert, 1921; Nisueta flavescens Caporiacco, 1941; Olios chiracanthiformis Caporiacco, 1941; Olios rufilatus Lessert, 1946; Olios schönlandi Roewer, 1955

= Olios auricomis =

Zanzibar Olios Huntsman Spider

Species of spider

Olios auricomis is a species of spider in the family Sparassidae. It is found across much of Africa and is commonly known as the Zanzibar Olios huntsman spider.

== Distribution ==
Olios auricomis has a wide distribution across Africa, occurring in Cameroon, Gambia, Ethiopia, Democratic Republic of the Congo, Kenya, Rwanda, Tanzania, Zanzibar, Angola, and South Africa.

In South Africa, the species is recorded from five provinces, Eastern Cape, Gauteng, KwaZulu-Natal, Limpopo, and Mpumalanga. It has been collected at altitudes ranging from 27 to 1,383 m above sea level.

== Habitat and ecology ==
Olios auricomis are nocturnal plant dwellers that wander around on vegetation in search of prey. They construct silk retreats between two leaves that are held together with silk strands. The species inhabits multiple biomes including Grassland, Indian Ocean Coastal Belt, and Savanna biomes. It has also been recorded from avocado and macadamia orchards.

== Description ==
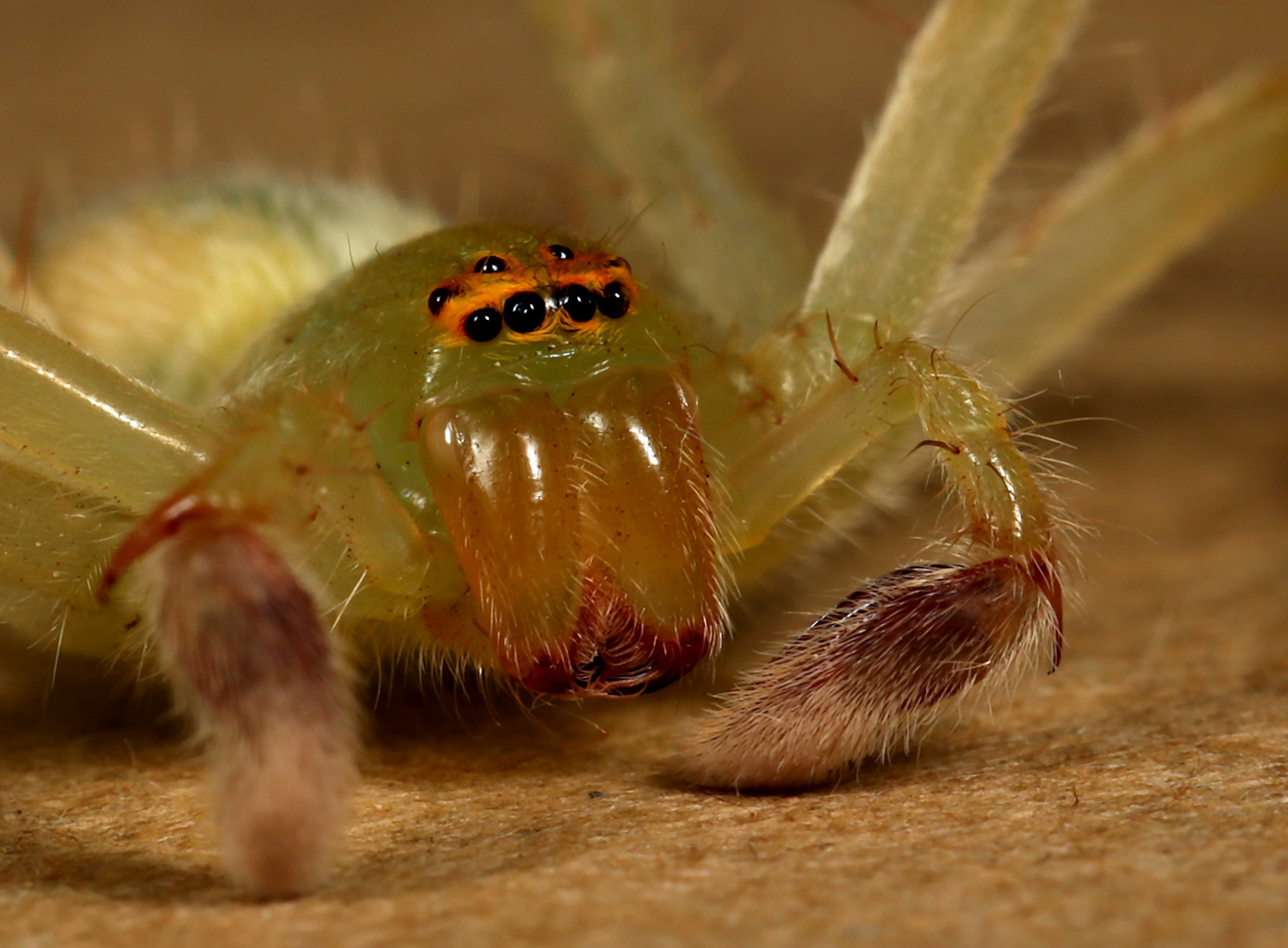

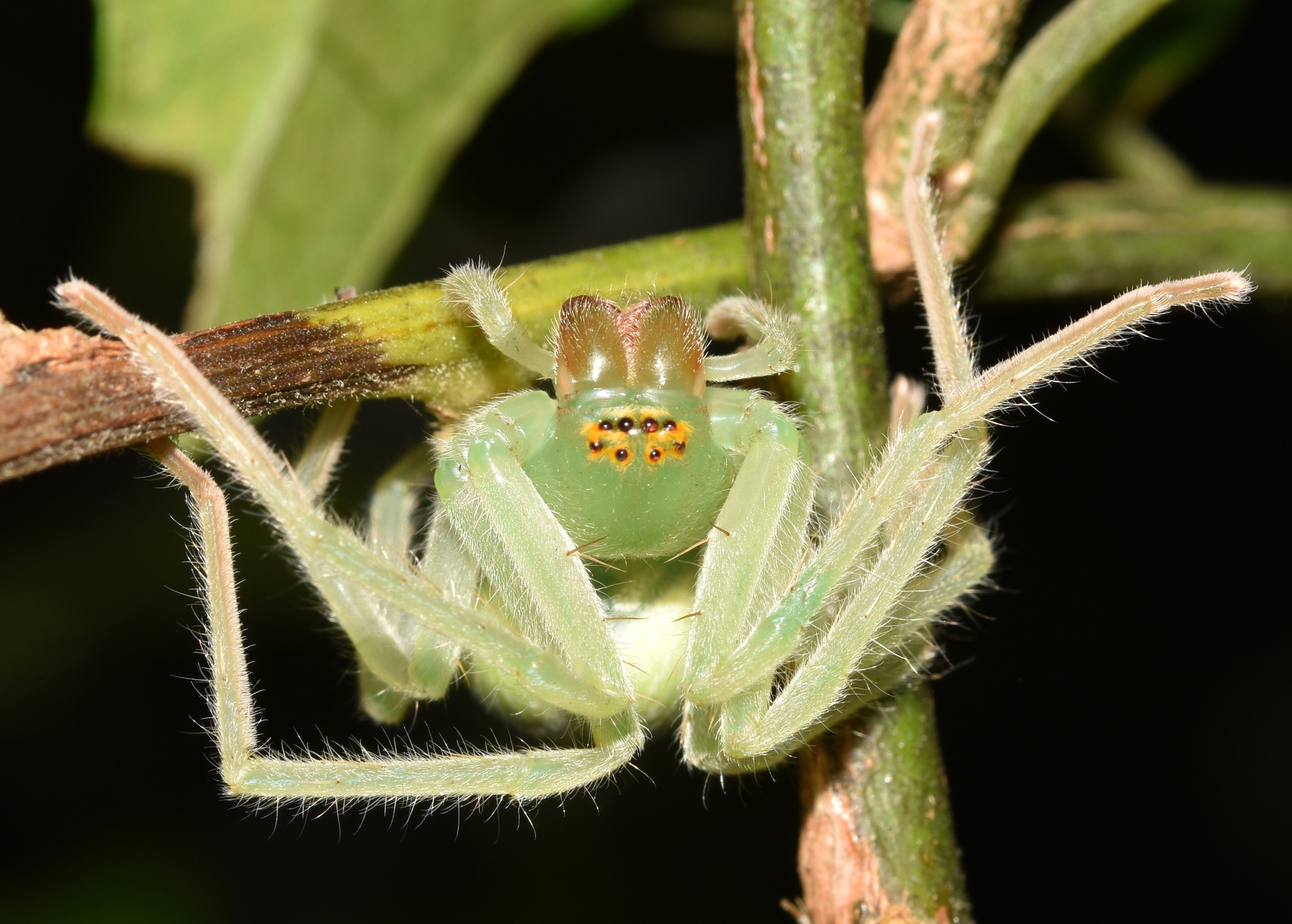

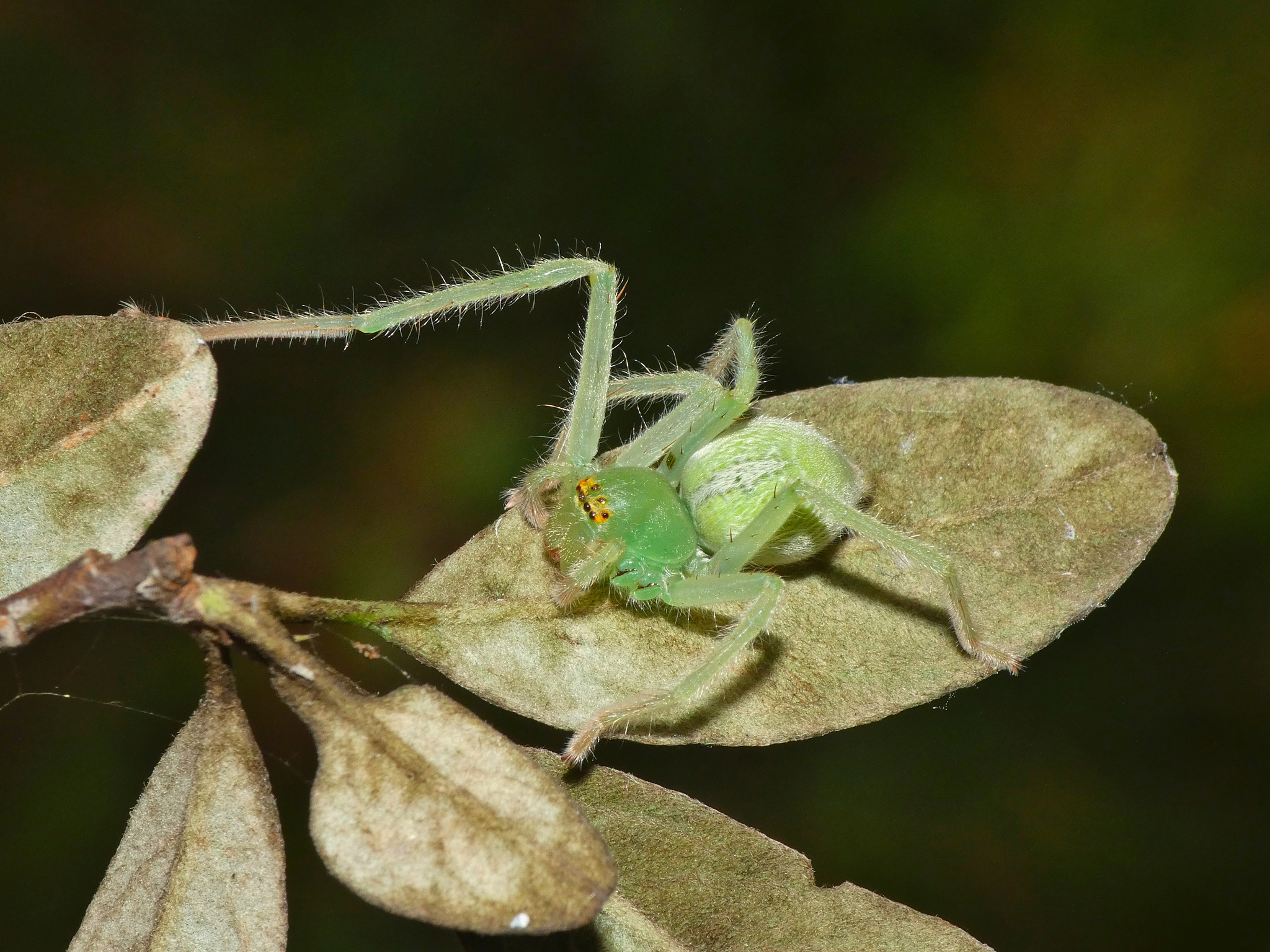

Olios auricomis is described as small to large sized within the Sparassidae family. When alive, specimens are green-coloured, but become yellowish when preserved in ethanol. The opisthosoma lacks a ventral patch.

== Conservation ==
Olios auricomis is listed as least concern by the South African National Biodiversity Institute due to its wide geographical range across Africa. In South Africa, the species is protected in several protected areas including Ezemvelo Nature Reserve, Ndumo Game Reserve, Lekgalameetse Nature Reserve, Kruger National Park, and Addo Elephant National Park.

== Taxonomy ==
The species was originally described by Eugène Simon in 1880 as Midamus auricomis from specimens collected in Zanzibar. A 2020 revision by Peter Jäger synonymized several previously recognized species with O. auricomis.

Jäger's revision placed O. auricomis in the Olios auricomis species group and treated O. schönlandi, O. rufilatus, O chiracanthiformis, O. ituricus, O. isongonis, O. pacifer, and O. flavescens as junior synonyms of O. auricomis. The World Spider Catalog currently recognizes O. auricomis as the accepted name and lists these taxa as synonyms.

The species is currently classified in the family Sparassidae and genus Olios.
