= Spintharus longisoma =

Scientific classification
- Domain: Eukaryota
- Kingdom: Animalia
- Phylum: Arthropoda
- Subphylum: Chelicerata
- Class: Arachnida
- Order: Araneae
- Infraorder: Araneomorphae
- Family: Theridiidae
- Genus: Spintharus
- Species: †S. longisoma

Binomial name
- †Spintharus longisoma Wunderlich, 1988

Species of spider

Spintharus longisoma is an extinct species of comb-footed spider in the family Theridiidae. It was found in Dominican amber.
