= Spintharus barackobamai =

Scientific classification
- Kingdom: Animalia
- Phylum: Arthropoda
- Subphylum: Chelicerata
- Class: Arachnida
- Order: Araneae
- Infraorder: Araneomorphae
- Family: Theridiidae
- Genus: Spintharus
- Species: S. barackobamai

Binomial name
- Spintharus barackobamai Agnarsson & Van Patten, 2018

Species of spider

Spintharus barackobamai is a species of comb-footed spider in the family Theridiidae. It is found in Cuba. It is one of 15 new species of Spintharus described in 2018.It was also named after President Barack Obama in honor of his climate change advocacy. It, along with the other species of Spintharus discovered in 2018, received media coverage for being named after celebrities.
