= Spintharus michelleobamaae =

Scientific classification
- Kingdom: Animalia
- Phylum: Arthropoda
- Subphylum: Chelicerata
- Class: Arachnida
- Order: Araneae
- Infraorder: Araneomorphae
- Family: Theridiidae
- Genus: Spintharus
- Species: S. michelleobamaae

Binomial name
- Spintharus michelleobamaae Agnarsson & Sargeant, 2018

Species of spider

Spintharus michelleobamaae is a species of comb-footed spider in the family Theridiidae. It is found in Cuba. It is one of 15 new species of Spintharus described in 2018. It was named after former First Lady of the United States Michelle Obama, in honor of her climate change advocacy. It, along with the other species of Spintharus discovered in 2018, received media coverage for being named after celebrities.
