= Spintharus gracilis =

Scientific classification
- Domain: Eukaryota
- Kingdom: Animalia
- Phylum: Arthropoda
- Subphylum: Chelicerata
- Class: Arachnida
- Order: Araneae
- Infraorder: Araneomorphae
- Family: Theridiidae
- Genus: Spintharus
- Species: S. gracilis

Binomial name
- Spintharus gracilis Keyserling, 1886

Species of spider

Spintharus gracilis is a species of comb-footed spider in the family Theridiidae. It is found in Brazil.
