= Bowie thorelli =

Scientific classification
- Kingdom: Animalia
- Phylum: Arthropoda
- Subphylum: Chelicerata
- Class: Arachnida
- Order: Araneae
- Infraorder: Araneomorphae
- Family: Ctenidae
- Genus: Bowie
- Species: B. thorelli

Binomial name
- Bowie thorelli (F. O. Pickard-Cambridge, 1897)

Synonyms
- Ctenus thorelli F. O. Pickard-Cambridge, 1897; Ctenus kandyensis Kim & Ye, 2014

Species of spider

Bowie thorelli, is a species of spider of the genus Bowie. It is endemic to Sri Lanka.
