= Brignoliella scrobiculata =

Scientific classification
- Kingdom: Animalia
- Phylum: Arthropoda
- Subphylum: Chelicerata
- Class: Arachnida
- Order: Araneae
- Infraorder: Araneomorphae
- Family: Tetrablemmidae
- Genus: Brignoliella
- Species: B. scrobiculata

Binomial name
- Brignoliella scrobiculata (Simon, 1893)

Species of spider

Brignoliella scrobiculata is a species of spiders of the genus Brignoliella. It is endemic to Sri Lanka,
