= Spintharus leonardodicaprioi =

Scientific classification
- Kingdom: Animalia
- Phylum: Arthropoda
- Subphylum: Chelicerata
- Class: Arachnida
- Order: Araneae
- Infraorder: Araneomorphae
- Family: Theridiidae
- Genus: Spintharus
- Species: S. leonardodicaprioi

Binomial name
- Spintharus leonardodicaprioi Van Patten & Agnarsson, 2018

Species of spider

Spintharus leonardodicaprioi is a species of theridiid spider. It is found in the Dominican Republic and was named in 2017 after the actor Leonardo DiCaprio for his environmental activism. It was named alongside several other Spintharus species whose specific epithets honored celebrities, and it received media coverage from around the world due to its name.

== See also ==
- List of organisms named after famous people (born 1950–1974)
- Grouvellinus leonardodicaprioi, a beetle named after DiCaprio
