= Sinopoda pengi =

Scientific classification
- Kingdom: Animalia
- Phylum: Arthropoda
- Subphylum: Chelicerata
- Class: Arachnida
- Order: Araneae
- Infraorder: Araneomorphae
- Family: Sparassidae
- Genus: Sinopoda
- Species: S. pengi

Binomial name
- Sinopoda pengi Song & Zhu, 1999

Species of spider

Sinopoda pengi is a species of spider in the huntsman spider family Sparassidae, found in China. The species was originally described in 1999 based on a male specimen – the supposed female was actually Heteropoda venatoria. The female was correctly described in 2019.
