= Spintharus dayleae =

Scientific classification
- Kingdom: Animalia
- Phylum: Arthropoda
- Subphylum: Chelicerata
- Class: Arachnida
- Order: Araneae
- Infraorder: Araneomorphae
- Family: Theridiidae
- Genus: Spintharus
- Species: S. dayleae

Binomial name
- Spintharus dayleae Sargeant & Agnarsson, 2018

Species of spider

Spintharus dayleae is a species of comb-footed spider in the family Theridiidae. It is found in Saint Lucia and Grenada. It is one of 15 new species described in 2018.
