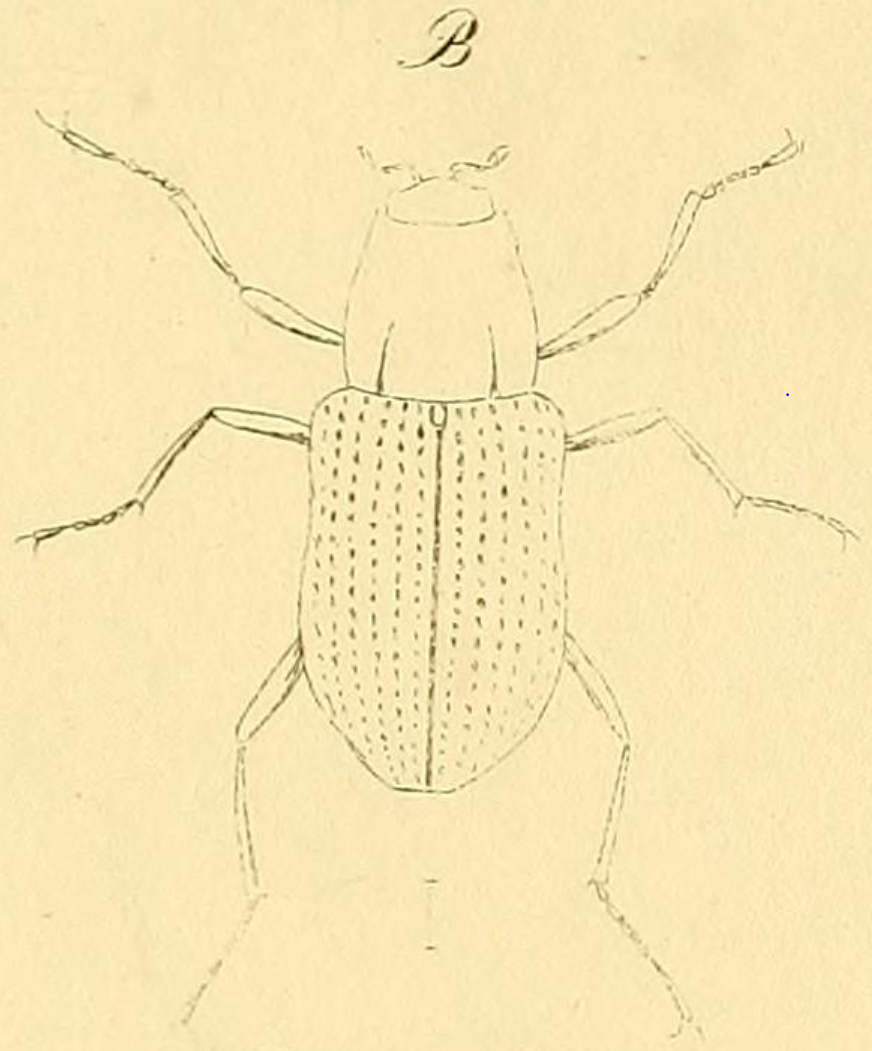
- G. caucasicus

Scientific classification
- Kingdom: Animalia
- Phylum: Arthropoda
- Class: Insecta
- Order: Coleoptera
- Suborder: Polyphaga
- Infraorder: Elateriformia
- Family: Elmidae
- Genus: Grouvellinus; Champion, 1923

Type species
- Macronychus caucasicus Victor, 1839

Synonyms
- Microdes Motschulsky, 1860 not Guenée, 1857; Grouvelleus Zaitzev, 1908 not Guillebeau, 1892

= Grouvellinus =

Genus of beetles

Grouvellinus is a genus of beetle in the family Elmidae. As of 2018, over forty species are recognized, including:

- Grouvellinus aeneus (Grouvelle, 1896) — Indonesia
- Grouvellinus amabilis Delève, 1970 — Vietnam
- Grouvellinus andrekuipersi Freitag et al., 2018 — Malaysia
- Grouvellinus babai Nomura, 1963
  - G. b. babai Nomura, 1963 — Taiwan
  - G. b. satoi Jen & Yang, 1998 — Japan
- Grouvellinus bishopi Jäch, 1984 — Malaysia
- Grouvellinus brevior Jäch, 1984 — Nepal
- Grouvellinus carinatus Jäch, 1984 — Nepal
- Grouvellinus carus Hinon, 1941 — China
- Grouvellinus caucasicus (Victor, 1839) — Armenia, Georgia, Greece, Iran, Iraq, Israel, Lebanon, Russia, Syria, Turkey
- Grouvellinus chinensis Mařan, 1939 — China
- Grouvellinus duplaris Champion, 1923 — India
- Grouvellinus frater (Grouvelle, 1896) — Indonesia
- Grouvellinus hadroscelis Jäch, 1984 — Nepal
- Grouvellinus hercules Jäch, 1984 — China, Nepal
- Grouvellinus hygropetricus Jeng & Yang, 1998 — Taiwan
- Grouvellinus impressus Jäch, 1984 — Indonesia
- Grouvellinus leonardodicaprioi Freitag et al., 2018 — Malaysia
- Grouvellinus marginatus (Kôno, 1934) — Japan
- Grouvellinus modiglianii (Grouvelle, 1896) — Indonesia
- Grouvellinus montanus Jeng & Yang, 1998 — Taiwan
- Grouvellinus nepalensis Delève, 1970 — China, Nepal
- Grouvellinus nitidus Nomura, 1963 — Japan
- Grouvellinus orbiculatus Dongju & Sun, 2016 — China
- Grouvellinus pelacoti Delève, 1970 — Vietnam
- Grouvellinus pilosus Jeng & Yang, 1998 — Taiwan
- Grouvellinus punctatostriatus Bollow, 1940 — Myanmar
- Grouvellinus quest Freitag et al., 2018 — Malaysia
- Grouvellinus rioloides (Reitter, 1887) — Afghanistan, China, Kazakhstan, Kyrgyzstan, Tajikistan, Turkmenistan, Uzbekistan
- Grouvellinus sagittatus Dongju & Sun, 2016 — China
- Grouvellinus sculptus Bollow, 1940 — Myanmar
- Grouvellinus setosus Delève, 1970 — Vietnam
- Grouvellinus silius Hinton, 1941 — Indonesia
- Grouvellinus sinensis (Grouvelle, 1906) — China
- Grouvellinus subopacus Nomura, 1962 — Japan
- Grouvellinus sumatrensis Jäch, 1984 — Indonesia
- Grouvellinus thienemanni Jäch, 1984 — Indonesia
- Grouvellinus tibetanus Jäch, 1984 — China, Nepal
- Grouvellinus tonkinus Grouvelle, 1889 — Vietnam
- Grouvellinus unicostatus Champion, 1923 — India
