= Spintharus rallorum =

Scientific classification
- Kingdom: Animalia
- Phylum: Arthropoda
- Subphylum: Chelicerata
- Class: Arachnida
- Order: Araneae
- Infraorder: Araneomorphae
- Family: Theridiidae
- Genus: Spintharus
- Species: S. rallorum

Binomial name
- Spintharus rallorum Chomitz & Agnarsson, 2018

Species of spider

Spintharus rallorum is a species of comb-footed spider in the family Theridiidae. It is found in Puerto Rico and Saint Kitts and Nevis. It is one of 15 new species described in 2018. The authors spelt the name as Spintharus ralli, but noted that it honoured the "grandparents of the first author of the species." As the name refers to more than one person, the World Spider Catalog changed it from the Latin genitive singular to the genitive plural.

== Taxonomy ==
The specific name was first published by B. Chomitz and Ingi Agnarsson in 2018 using the spelling ralli. The original publication explained that the name honours the "grandparents of the first author of the species." As the name refers to more than one person, one male and one female, Art. 31.1.2 of the International Code of Zoological Nomenclature (ICZN) says that the name is to be formed using the Latin genitive plural ending -orum. The World Spider Catalog uses the spelling rallorum. Art. 32.5 of the ICZN says that an "inadvertent error" must be corrected, but that incorrect Latinization is not considered an "inadvertent error". Correct original spellings may not be changed (Art. 32.3). Other taxonomic databases using the spelling rallorum include ITIS and the Global Biodiversity Information Facility.
