= Grouvellinus duplaris =

Scientific classification
- Kingdom: Animalia
- Phylum: Arthropoda
- Class: Insecta
- Order: Coleoptera
- Suborder: Polyphaga
- Infraorder: Elateriformia
- Family: Elmidae
- Genus: Grouvellinus
- Species: G. duplaris

Binomial name
- Grouvellinus duplaris Champion, 1923

Species of beetle

Grouvellinus duplaris is a beetle species from the riffle beetle family. The scientific name of the species was published in 1923 by Champion. It is endemic to India.
