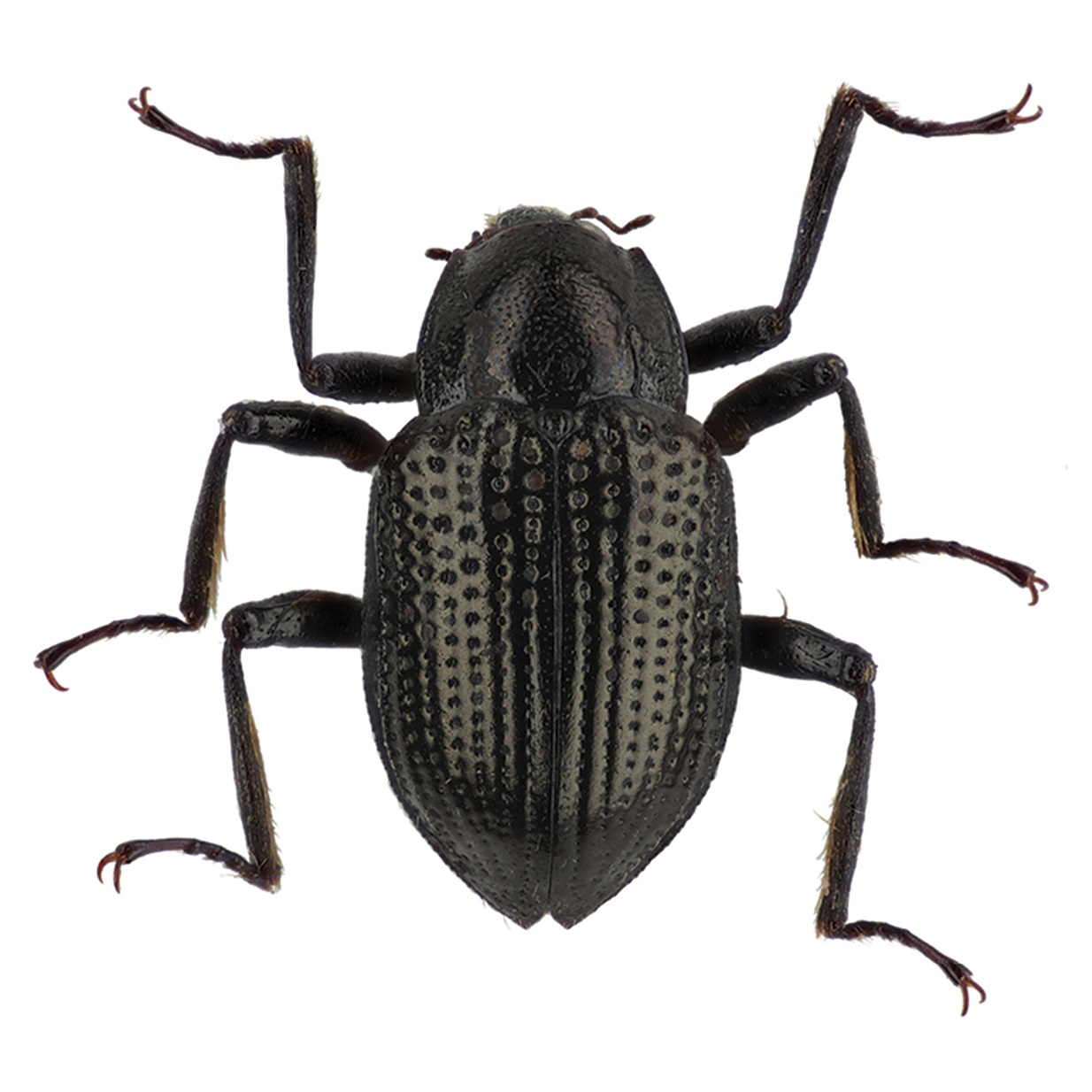
- Dorsal view of male holotype

Scientific classification
- Kingdom: Animalia
- Phylum: Arthropoda
- Clade: Pancrustacea
- Class: Insecta
- Order: Coleoptera
- Suborder: Polyphaga
- Infraorder: Elateriformia
- Family: Elmidae
- Genus: Grouvellinus
- Species: G. leonardodicaprioi

Binomial name
- Grouvellinus leonardodicaprioi Freitag, Pangantihon & Njunjić, 2018

= Grouvellinus leonardodicaprioi =

Species of beetle

Grouvellinus leonardodicaprioi is a species of riffle beetle in the superfamily Byrrhoidea. The beetle was discovered by citizen scientists working with a group of scientists from Taxon Expeditions. G. leonardodicaprioi belongs to the family Elmidae, and it is endemic to Malaysia.

== Etymology ==
The species was named after actor and environmentalist Leonardo DiCaprio to acknowledge his work in "promoting environmental awareness and bringing the problems of climate change and biodiversity loss into the spotlight". The species description received media coverage by news outlets such as The Guardian, USA Today, and Forbes due to its name.

== See also ==
- List of organisms named after famous people (born 1950–1974)
- Spintharus leonardodicaprioi, a spider named after DiCaprio
