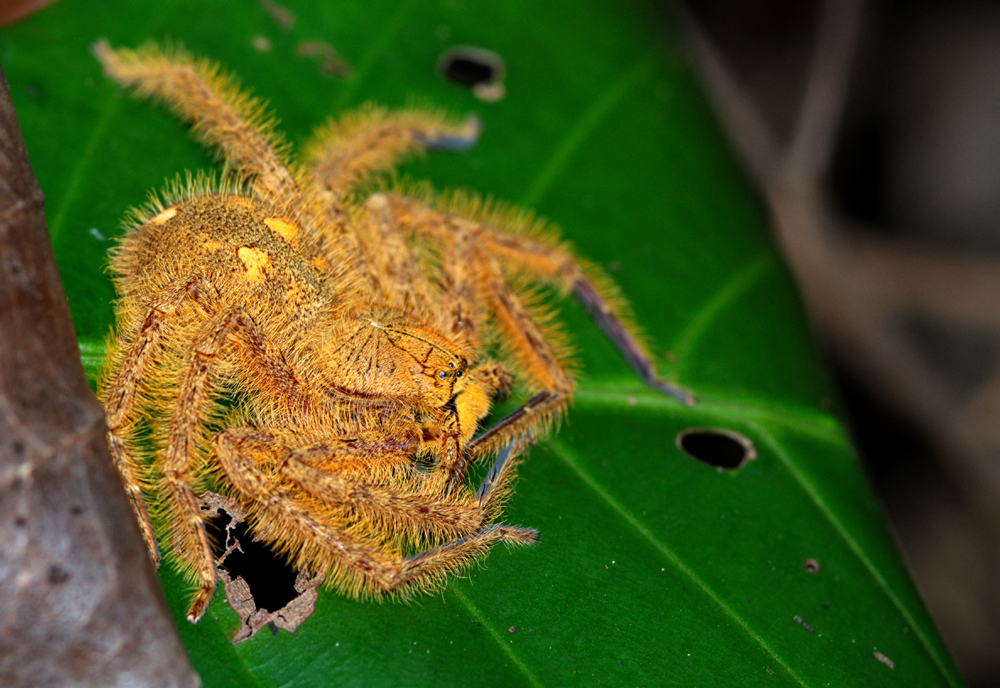
- Individual seen in Singapore

Scientific classification
- Kingdom: Animalia
- Phylum: Arthropoda
- Subphylum: Chelicerata
- Class: Arachnida
- Order: Araneae
- Infraorder: Araneomorphae
- Family: Sparassidae
- Genus: Heteropoda
- Species: H. davidbowie

Binomial name
- Heteropoda davidbowie Jäger, 2008

= Heteropoda davidbowie =

Species of spider

Heteropoda davidbowie is a species of huntsman spider of the genus Heteropoda. It was described from the Cameron Highlands District in peninsular Malaysia and named in honour of singer David Bowie.

== Taxonomy ==
Heteropoda davidbowie was first described by Peter Jäger in 2008, based on a specimen collected by G. Ackermann in 2007 in the Cameron Highlands of peninsular Malaysia. The species name honours David Bowie, with particular reference to songs such as "Glass Spider" (from the 1987 album Never Let Me Down), as well as the 1972 album The Rise and Fall of Ziggy Stardust and the Spiders from Mars, and the resemblance of the frontal view of the spider to the singer's painted face in his early career.

== Description ==
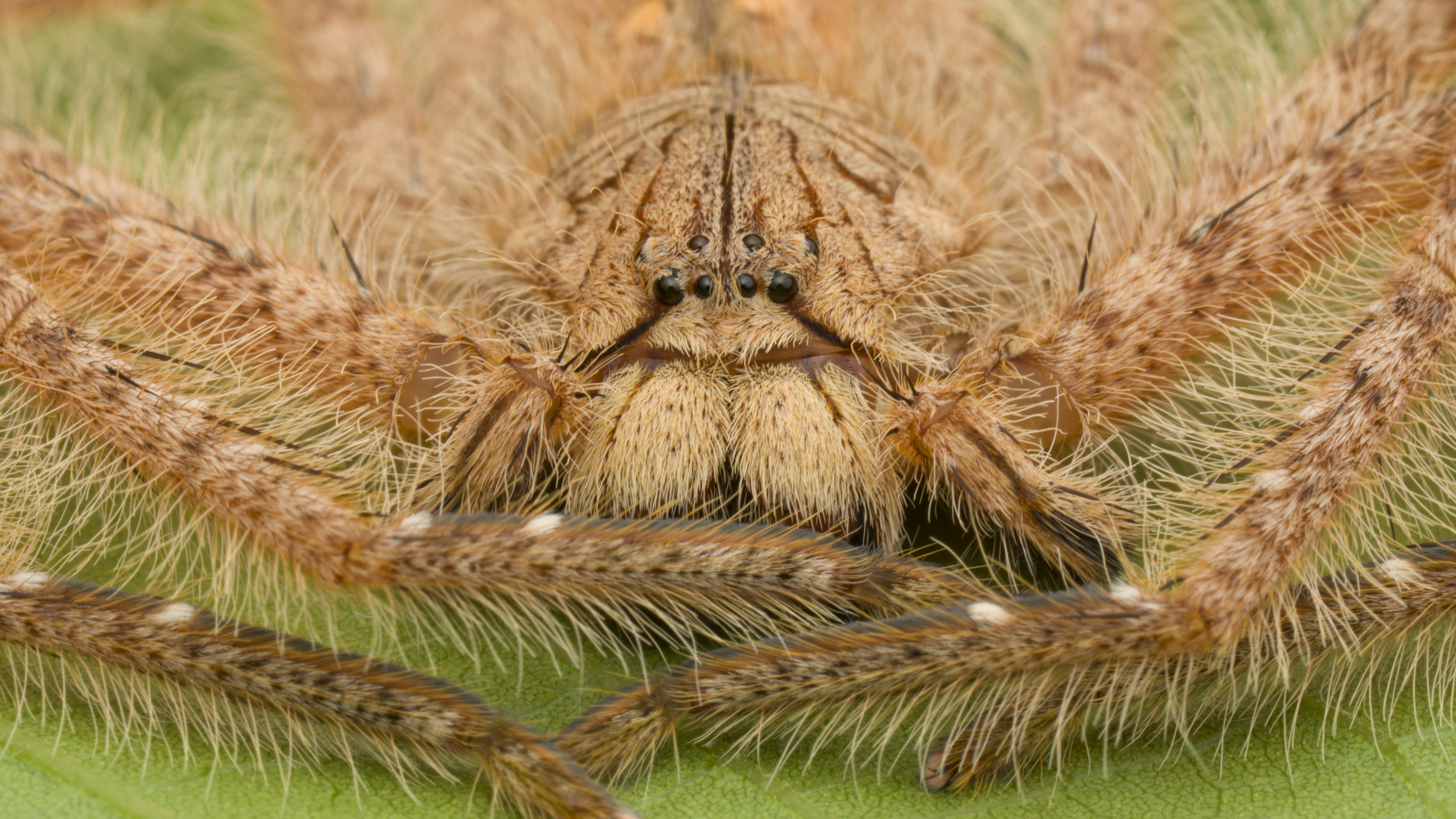
Front view of spider

The eye arrangement of spiders in the genus Heteropoda

They are sexually dimorphic and body length ranges from medium to large: the male 15.3–18.2 millimetres (0.60–0.72 in); the female 21.3–25.3 mm (0.84–1.00 in). Males have an overall reddish brown dorsum with distinct brightly colored hairs forming patches and lines. The body has short dense hair, prominently interspersed with long bright orange hairs. The posterior half of body has a distinct red line surrounded by red hairs. The pedipalps are black, and the legs lack any distinct pattern. Females are similar to males, but the female's dorsum coloration may vary from greyish to reddish brown. Their legs are annulated with dark spots on bright regions, and there is a prominent triangular patch on the venter between the epigastric furrow and spinnerets.

== Distribution ==
Heteropoda davidbowie is found in West Malaysia (Cameron Highlands), Singapore, Sumatra and possibly southern Thailand.

== Natural history and ecology ==
Adults are often seen on tree bark. Juveniles have been found on leaf litter and leaves on shrubs.

== See also ==
- Bowie (spider)
- Spintharus davidbowiei
- List of organisms named after famous people (born 1925–1949)
