= Bowie corniger =

Scientific classification
- Kingdom: Animalia
- Phylum: Arthropoda
- Subphylum: Chelicerata
- Class: Arachnida
- Order: Araneae
- Infraorder: Araneomorphae
- Family: Ctenidae
- Genus: Bowie
- Species: B. corniger

Binomial name
- Bowie corniger (F. O. Pickard-Cambridge, 1898)

Synonyms
- Ctenus corniger F. O. Pickard-Cambridge, 1898

Species of spider

Bowie corniger is a species of spider in the family Ctenidae. It is endemic to South Africa.

== Etymology ==
The species name corniger means "horn-bearing" in Latin, likely referring to morphological features of the species.

== Distribution ==
Bowie corniger is found only in South Africa, specifically in KwaZulu-Natal province, though no exact locality is known.

== Habitat and ecology ==
The species is a free-running ground dweller.

== Description ==
Bowie corniger is known only from males. Although drawings were provided by Benoit in 1979, species identification remains problematic.

== Conservation ==
Bowie corniger is listed as Data Deficient for taxonomic reasons. Too little is known about the location, habitat and threats of this taxon for a proper assessment to be made. More sampling is needed as well as redescription of type material.

== Taxonomy ==
The species was originally described by Frederick Octavius Pickard-Cambridge in 1898 from Natal. In 2022, it was transferred from the genus Ctenus to the newly erected genus Bowie by Jäger. It was revised by Pierre Benoit in 1979.
