= Bowie ceylonensis =

Scientific classification
- Kingdom: Animalia
- Phylum: Arthropoda
- Subphylum: Chelicerata
- Class: Arachnida
- Order: Araneae
- Infraorder: Araneomorphae
- Family: Ctenidae
- Genus: Bowie
- Species: B. ceylonensis

Binomial name
- Bowie ceylonensis (F. O. Pickard-Cambridge, 1897)

Synonyms
- Ctenus ceylonensis F. O. Pickard-Cambridge, 1897; Ctenus cuspidatus F. O. Pickard-Cambridge, 1902

Species of spider

Bowie ceylonensis, is a species of spider of the genus Bowie. It is endemic to Sri Lanka.
