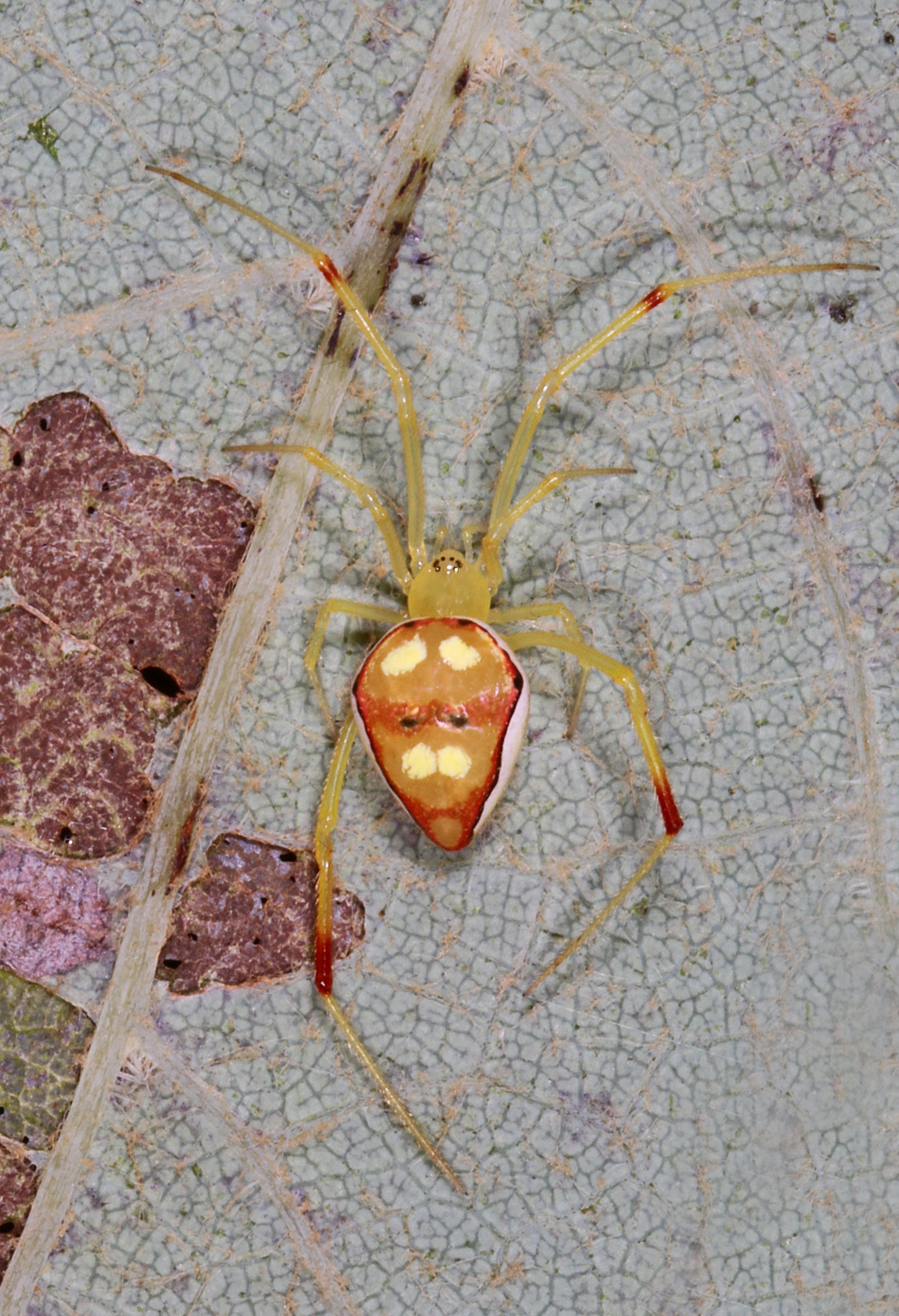
- S. flavidus from Maryland.

Scientific classification
- Kingdom: Animalia
- Phylum: Arthropoda
- Subphylum: Chelicerata
- Class: Arachnida
- Order: Araneae
- Infraorder: Araneomorphae
- Family: Theridiidae
- Genus: Spintharus; Hentz, 1850

Type species
- Spintharus flavidus Hentz, 1850

Species
- See text.

Diversity
- c. 18 extant species; 1 fossil species

= Spintharus =

Spintharus Temporal range: Neogene–present

Genus of spiders

The spider genus Spintharus occurs from the northeastern United States to Brazil. Nicholas Marcellus Hentz circumscribed the genus in 1850, initially as a monospecific genus containing his newly described species S. flavidus.

It is very similar to the genus Thwaitesia, and both are similar to Episinus. Unlike Argyrodes, they have two setae in place of a colulus.

Specimens of S. flavidus are variable in structure. Only some have an elevated eye region or humps on the anterior of the abdomen.

Females of S. gracilis are 3.7mm long, males 2.3mm.

A revision of the genus by Ingi Agnarsson and colleagues printed in 2018 included the description of fifteen new species, as well as the removal of S. argenteus. Some of the new specific names were named in honor of political figures, artists, and celebrities. As of 2017, when the electronic pre-print was published, Spintharus was the spider genus with the most species named after celebrities.

An earlier revision of the genus was by Herbert Walter Levi; his taxonomy recognized two species: S. flavidus and S. gracilis.

== Species ==
Female S. flavidus (w/o legs).

As of 2020, the World Spider Catalog (WSC), largely following Agnarsson and colleagues, accepts the following extant species:

- Spintharus barackobamai Agnarsson & Van Patten, 2018 – Cuba
- Spintharus berniesandersi Agnarsson & Sargeant, 2018 – Cuba
- Spintharus davidattenboroughi Agnarsson & Van Patten, 2018 – Jamaica
- Spintharus davidbowiei Agnarsson & Chomitz, 2018 – Mexico
- Spintharus dayleae Sargeant & Agnarsson, 2018 – Saint Lucia, Grenada
- Spintharus flavidus Hentz, 1850 (type species) – USA, Central and South America
- Spintharus frosti Van Patten & Agnarsson, 2018 – Dominican Republic
- Spintharus giraldoalayoni Agnarsson & Chomitz, 2018 – Cuba
- Spintharus goodbreadae Chomitz & Agnarsson, 2018 – Cuba
- Spintharus gracilis Keyserling, 1886 – Brazil
- Spintharus greerae Sargeant & Agnarsson, 2018 – Mexico
- Spintharus jesselaueri Sargeant & Agnarsson, 2018 – Dominica
- Spintharus leonardodicaprioi Van Patten & Agnarsson, 2018 – Dominican Republic
- Spintharus leverger LeMay & Agnarsson, 2020 – Brazil
- Spintharus manrayi Chomitz & Agnarsson, 2018 – Cuba
- Spintharus michelleobamaae Agnarsson & Sargeant, 2018 – Cuba
- Spintharus rallorum Chomitz & Agnarsson, 2018 – Puerto Rico, Saint Kitts and Nevis
- Spintharus skelly Van Patten & Agnarsson, 2018 – Dominican Republic

The WSC also recognizes one fossil species in the genus:

- † Spintharus longisoma Wunderlich, 1988 — Dominican amber

Formerly accepted species in Spintharus include:

- Spintharus minutus Petrunkevitch, 1926 (= Theridion antillanum Simon, 1894)
- Spintharus hentzi Levi, 1955 (= Spintharus flavidus Hentz, 1850)
- Spintharus argenteus Dyal, 1935 (nomen dubium)
