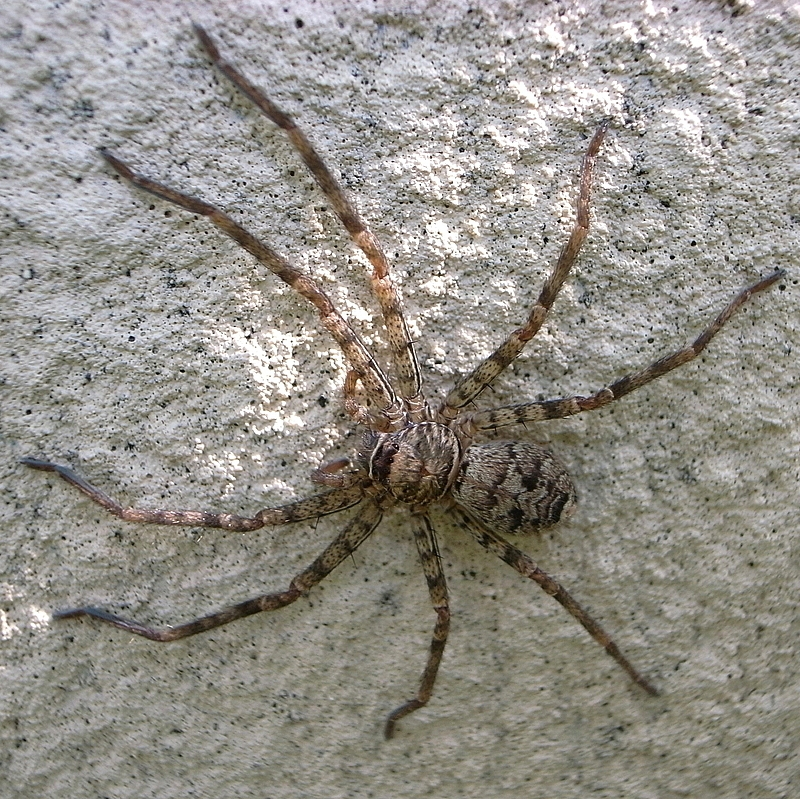

Scientific classification
- Kingdom: Animalia
- Phylum: Arthropoda
- Subphylum: Chelicerata
- Class: Arachnida
- Order: Araneae
- Infraorder: Araneomorphae
- Family: Sparassidae
- Genus: Sinopoda
- Species: S. forcipata

Binomial name
- Sinopoda forcipata (Karsch, 1881)

= Sinopoda forcipata =

Species of spider

Sinopoda forcipata is a species of spider in the family Sparassidae (huntsman spiders). It was described by Ferdinand Karsch in 1881.
