= Giant Laotian harvestman =

Scientific classification
- Kingdom: Animalia
- Phylum: Arthropoda
- Subphylum: Chelicerata
- Class: Arachnida
- Order: Opiliones
- Family: Sclerosomatidae
- Genus: Possibly Gagrella
- Species: Undescribed

Binomial name
- Undescribed

Species of harvestman/daddy longlegs

The Giant Laotian harvestman is the unofficial name for an as-yet undescribed species of Opiliones belonging to the family Sclerosomatidae. The species was discovered in April 2012 near a cave in the southern province of Khammouan, by Dr. Peter Jäger of the Senckenberg Research Institute in Frankfurt, Germany, whilst shooting a television documentary about the wildlife of Laos.

== Physical description ==
The Giant Laotian harvestman dwells inside the caves of Laos, and has a leg span stretching just over 330 millimeters (13 inches), thus making it the second largest harvestman discovered so far – surpassed only by another species in South America.

== Predators ==
Predators of the giant Laotian harvestman most likely include the larger but not as lengthy giant huntsman spider (Heteropoda maxima), the centipede Thereuopoda longicornis, other larger arthropods in terms of body mass (such as other predatory centipedes, huntsman spiders and larger arachnids), and small cave mammals.

== Binomial nomenclature ==
As of 2012, the Giant Laotian harvestman is still undescribed, lacking a scientific name. Opiliones taxonomist Dr. Ana Lúcia Tourinho concluded that it likely belongs to the genus Gagrella; additional samples have been collected and preserved in ethanol to allow their DNA to be sequenced to test this.
