= Sinopoda scurion =

Scientific classification
- Kingdom: Animalia
- Phylum: Arthropoda
- Subphylum: Chelicerata
- Class: Arachnida
- Order: Araneae
- Infraorder: Araneomorphae
- Family: Sparassidae
- Genus: Sinopoda
- Species: S. scurion

Binomial name
- Sinopoda scurion Jäger, 2012

Species of spider

Sinopoda scurion is a species of huntsman spider discovered in 2012 in a Laotian cave. It has a leg span of about 6 centimetres (2.4 in) and a body span of about 12 millimetres (0.47 in). It is the first recorded huntsman spider to lack eyes. Due to its dark cave habitat, it has no requirement of vision for hunting.

== Discovery and naming ==
Sinopoda scurion was found in a cave in Laos, around 100 km away from the Xe Bang Fai cave.

The eyeless huntsman spider was named after the Swiss company Scurion that makes headlamps for cavers.
