= Brignoliella ratnapura =

Scientific classification
- Kingdom: Animalia
- Phylum: Arthropoda
- Subphylum: Chelicerata
- Class: Arachnida
- Order: Araneae
- Infraorder: Araneomorphae
- Family: Tetrablemmidae
- Genus: Brignoliella
- Species: B. ratnapura

Binomial name
- Brignoliella ratnapura Shear, 1988

Species of spider

Brignoliella ratnapura is a species of spider of the genus Brignoliella. It is endemic to Sri Lanka. B. ratnapura was first described from specimens recovered in the Ratnapura region, hence the spider's specific name.
