= Spintharus davidbowiei =

Scientific classification
- Kingdom: Animalia
- Phylum: Arthropoda
- Subphylum: Chelicerata
- Class: Arachnida
- Order: Araneae
- Infraorder: Araneomorphae
- Family: Theridiidae
- Genus: Spintharus
- Species: S. davidbowiei

Binomial name
- Spintharus davidbowiei Agnarsson & Chomitz, 2018

Species of spider

Spintharus davidbowiei is a species of comb-footed spider in the family Theridiidae. It is found in Mexico. It is one of 15 new species described in 2018. About its naming, the authors wrote: "The species epithet honours the great artist David Bowie who passed away prematurely in 2016, but whose music will continue to inspire the generations to come."

== See also ==
- Bowie (spider)
- Heteropoda davidbowie
- List of organisms named after famous people (born 1925–1949)
