= Gagrella =

Scientific classification
- Kingdom: Animalia
- Phylum: Arthropoda
- Subphylum: Chelicerata
- Class: Arachnida
- Order: Opiliones
- Family: Sclerosomatidae
- Subfamily: Gagrellinae
- Genus: Gagrella; Stoliczka, 1869

Genus of harvestmen/daddy longlegs

Gagrella is a large genus of harvestmen in the family Sclerosomatidae from Asia.

== Species ==
- Gagrella aenescens Thorell, 1889
- Gagrella aenigra Roewer, 1954
- Gagrella albertisii Thorell, 1876
- Gagrella albicoxata Roewer, 1954
- Gagrella albifrons Roewer, 1915
- Gagrella albipunctata Suzuki, 1977
- Gagrella amboinensis (Doleschall, 1857)
- Gagrella annapurnica J. Martens, 1987
- Gagrella annulatipes Roewer, 1912
- Gagrella aorana Roewer, 1954
- Gagrella apoensis Suzuki, 1977
- Gagrella argentea Roewer, 1913
- Gagrella armillata Thorell, 1889
- Gagrella arthrocentra Roewer, 1910
- Gagrella asperula (Roewer, 1955)
- Gagrella atra (Roewer, 1929)
- Gagrella atrata Stoliczka, 1869
- Gagrella atrorubra Simon, 1901
- Gagrella aura
- Gagrella aurantiaca (Roewer, 1929)
- Gagrella aureolata Roewer, 1915
- Gagrella aurispina Roewer, 1954
- Gagrella auromaculata Roewer, 1954
- Gagrella auroscutata Roewer, 1954
- Gagrella beauforti Roewer, 1911
- Gagrella bella Roewer, 1954
- Gagrella bengalica Roewer, 1954
- Gagrella biarmata Roewer, 1954
- Gagrella bicolor (Roewer, 1915)
- Gagrella bicolorispina Roewer, 1954
- Gagrella binotata Simon, 1887
- Gagrella biseriata Simon, 1901
- Gagrella biseriata (Roewer, 1912) (Homonym)
- Gagrella borneoensis Roewer, 1954
- Gagrella brunnea Roewer, 1954
- Gagrella buruana Roewer, 1954
- Gagrella caerulea Roewer, 1910
- Gagrella cana Roewer, 1954
- Gagrella carinia Roewer, 1936
- Gagrella ceramensis Roewer, 1911
- Gagrella cerata Roewer, 1913
- Gagrella cervina Simon, 1887
- Gagrella ceylonensis Karsch, 1891
- Gagrella cinctipes (Banks, 1930)
- Gagrella cinerascens Roewer, 1910
- Gagrella concinna Thorell, 1891
- Gagrella coriacea Roewer, 1910
- Gagrella corrugata Roewer, 1954
- Gagrella crassitarsis Suzuki, 1970
- Gagrella cruciata Roewer, 1923
- Gagrella cuprea Roewer, 1910
- Gagrella cuprinitens Roewer, 1954
- Gagrella curuanica S. Suzuki, 1982
- Gagrella curvispina Roewer, 1913
- Gagrella cyanargentea Roewer, 1915
- Gagrella cyanatra Roewer, 1954
- Gagrella delicatula Roewer, 1954
- Gagrella denticulata S.Suzuki, 1976
- Gagrella denticulatifrons Roewer, 1954
- Gagrella diluta (Roewer, 1929)
- Gagrella disticta Thorell, 1889
- Gagrella dubia Giltay, 1930
- Gagrella duplex Roewer, 1915
- Gagrella elegans Simon, 1877
- Gagrella ephippiata Thorell, 1891
- Gagrella erebea Thorell, 1889
- Gagrella feae Thorell, 1889
- Gagrella figurata (Roewer, 1923)
- Gagrella flava Roewer, 1910
- Gagrella flavimaculata With, 1903
- Gagrella fokiensis Roewer, 1954
- Gagrella foveolata Roewer, 1923
- Gagrella fragilis With, 1903
- Gagrella franzi J. Martens, 1987
- Gagrella fulva Roewer, 1910
- Gagrella fuscipes Roewer, 1910
- Gagrella godavariensis Suzuki, 1970
- Gagrella gracilis (Roewer, 1910)
- Gagrella grandissima Mello-Leitão, 1944
- Gagrella grandis (Roewer, 1910)
- Gagrella granobunus Roewer, 1954
- Gagrella granulata (Roewer, 1954)
- Gagrella gravelyi Roewer, 1912
- Gagrella grisea Roewer, 1911
- Gagrella guttata Karsch, 1881
- Gagrella hainanensis Roewer, 1911
- Gagrella hansenii With, 1903
- Gagrella hasseltii Thorell, 1891
- Gagrella heinrichi Roewer, 1954
- Gagrella hirta With, 1903
- Gagrella histrionica Thorell, 1889
- Gagrella impressata (Roewer, 1955)
- Gagrella indochinensis Roewer, 1927
- Gagrella infuscata Roewer, 1911
- Gagrella insculpta Pocock, 1897
- Gagrella insulana Roewer, 1954
- Gagrella iwamasai Suzuki, 1977
- Gagrella javana (Roewer, 1954)
- Gagrella kanaria (Roewer, 1929)
- Gagrella laciniipes (Roewer, 1955)
- Gagrella lateitia Roewer, 1954
- Gagrella leopoldi Giltay, 1930
- Gagrella lepida Thorell, 1889
- Gagrella leucobunus Roewer, 1912
- Gagrella leucobunus (Roewer, 1954) Homonym
- Gagrella lineatipes Roewer, 1911
- Gagrella longipalpis Thorell, 1891
- Gagrella longipes S. Suzuki, 1982
- Gagrella longispina Roewer, 1913
- Gagrella luteofrontalis Roewer, 1910
- Gagrella luteomaculata S. Suzuki, 1982
- Gagrella luzonica Loman, 1902
- Gagrella maculipes (Banks, 1930)
- Gagrella magnifica Roewer, 1910
- Gagrella maindroni Simon, 1897
- Gagrella malabarica Roewer, 1954
- Gagrella malkini Suzuki, 1977
- Gagrella marginata Roewer, 1954
- Gagrella matherania (Roewer, 1915)
- Gagrella melanobunus Suzuki, 1977
- Gagrella mertoni Strand, 1911
- Gagrella mindanaoensis Suzuki, 1977
- Gagrella minuta Roewer, 1954
- Gagrella mjobergi (Banks, 1930)
- Gagrella moluccana (Roewer, 1954)
- Gagrella monticola Thorell, 1891
- Gagrella natuna Roewer, 1912
- Gagrella neocera Forster, 1949
- Gagrella nigerrima (Roewer, 1910)
- Gagrella nigra (Roewer, 1955)
- Gagrella nigrescens Roewer, 1954
- Gagrella nigripalpis Roewer, 1910
- Gagrella nigripes (Banks, 1930)
- Gagrella niponica Roewer, 1954
- Gagrella nobilis With, 1903
- Gagrella nocticolor Thorell, 1889
- Gagrella obscura Simon, 1877
- Gagrella ochracea (Roewer, 1954)
- Gagrella ochroleuca Roewer, 1954
- Gagrella opaca Roewer, 1954
- Gagrella orientalis (Roewer, 1954)
- Gagrella ornata Roewer, 1910
- Gagrella ovata (Sato & Suzuki, 1938)
- Gagrella pahangia (Roewer, 1954)
- Gagrella palawanica Suzuki, 1977
- Gagrella parallela Roewer, 1931
- Gagrella patalungensis Simon, 1901
- Gagrella paupera With, 1905
- Gagrella peguana (Roewer, 1955)
- Gagrella perfecta (Roewer, 1954)
- Gagrella plebeja (Thorell, 1889)
- Gagrella prasina Roewer, 1911
- Gagrella pretiosa (Banks, 1930)
- Gagrella promeana Roewer, 1954
- Gagrella pullata Thorell, 1891
- Gagrella pumilio Karsch, 1881
- Gagrella punctata Roewer, 1954
- Gagrella quadrimaculata Roewer, 1954
- Gagrella quadriseiata Roewer, 1954
- Gagrella quadrivittata Simon, 1887
- Gagrella reticulata Suzuki, 1977
- Gagrella reunionis (Roewer, 1954)
- Gagrella rorida Roewer, 1954
- Gagrella rubra (Roewer, 1910)
- Gagrella rufa Roewer, 1954
- Gagrella rugosa (Roewer, 1955)
- Gagrella sadona Roewer, 1954
- Gagrella sampitia Roewer, 1954
- Gagrella sarasinorum Roewer, 1913
- Gagrella sarawakensis With, 1905
- Gagrella satarana Roewer, 1954
- Gagrella satoi (Roewer, 1955)
- Gagrella scabra Roewer, 1912
- Gagrella scintillans Roewer, 1910
- Gagrella scorbiculata Thorell, 1891
- Gagrella scutaurea Roewer, 1954
- Gagrella semangkokensis Suzuki, 1972
- Gagrella semigranosa Simon, 1901
- Gagrella serrulata Roewer, 1910
- Gagrella sexmaculata Suzuki, 1970
- Gagrella sherriffsi Roewer, 1954
- Gagrella signata Stoliczka, 1869
- Gagrella similaris (Roewer, 1955)
- Gagrella similis (Roewer, 1911)
- Gagrella similis Suzuki, 1977 (Homonym)
- Gagrella sinensis Roewer, 1954
- Gagrella speciosa (Roewer, 1912) (Homonym)
- Gagrella speciosa Roewer, 1911
- Gagrella spinacantha Roewer, 1936
- Gagrella spinoculata Roewer, 1931
- Gagrella spinulosa Thorell, 1889
- Gagrella splendens With, 1903
- Gagrella strinatii (Silhavý, 1974)
- Gagrella subfusca Roewer, 1910
- Gagrella sulphurea Roewer, 1912
- Gagrella suluana Roewer, 1954
- Gagrella sumatrana (S. Suzuki, 1982)
- Gagrella sumba Roewer, 1954
- Gagrella tenuipalpis Suzuki, 1977
- Gagrella testacea Roewer, 1954
- Gagrella thaiensis S. Suzuki, 1982
- Gagrella thienemanni (Roewer, 1931)
- Gagrella thorelli (Banks, 1930)
- Gagrella tibialis Roewer, 1931
- Gagrella tinjurae J. Martens, 1987
- Gagrella transversalis (Roewer, 1912)
- Gagrella triangularis With, 1903
- Gagrella tricolor Roewer, 1954
- Gagrella tristis (Thorell, 1889)
- Gagrella trochanteralis (Roewer, 1955)
- Gagrella tuberculata Roewer, 1913
- Gagrella turki Roewer, 1954
- Gagrella unicolor (Roewer, 1912)
- Gagrella unispinosa With, 1903
- Gagrella varians With, 1903
- Gagrella victoria Roewer, 1954
- Gagrella viridalba Roewer, 1954
- Gagrella viridargentea Roewer, 1954
- Gagrella vittata (Roewe, 1910)
- Gagrella vulcanica (Doleschall, 1857)
- Gagrella wangi (Zhu & Song, 1999)
- Gagrella werneri Suzuki, 1977
- Gagrella withi Mello-Leitão, 1944
- Gagrella yuennanensis (Roewer, 1910)
- Gagrella yodoensis Roewer, 1954
