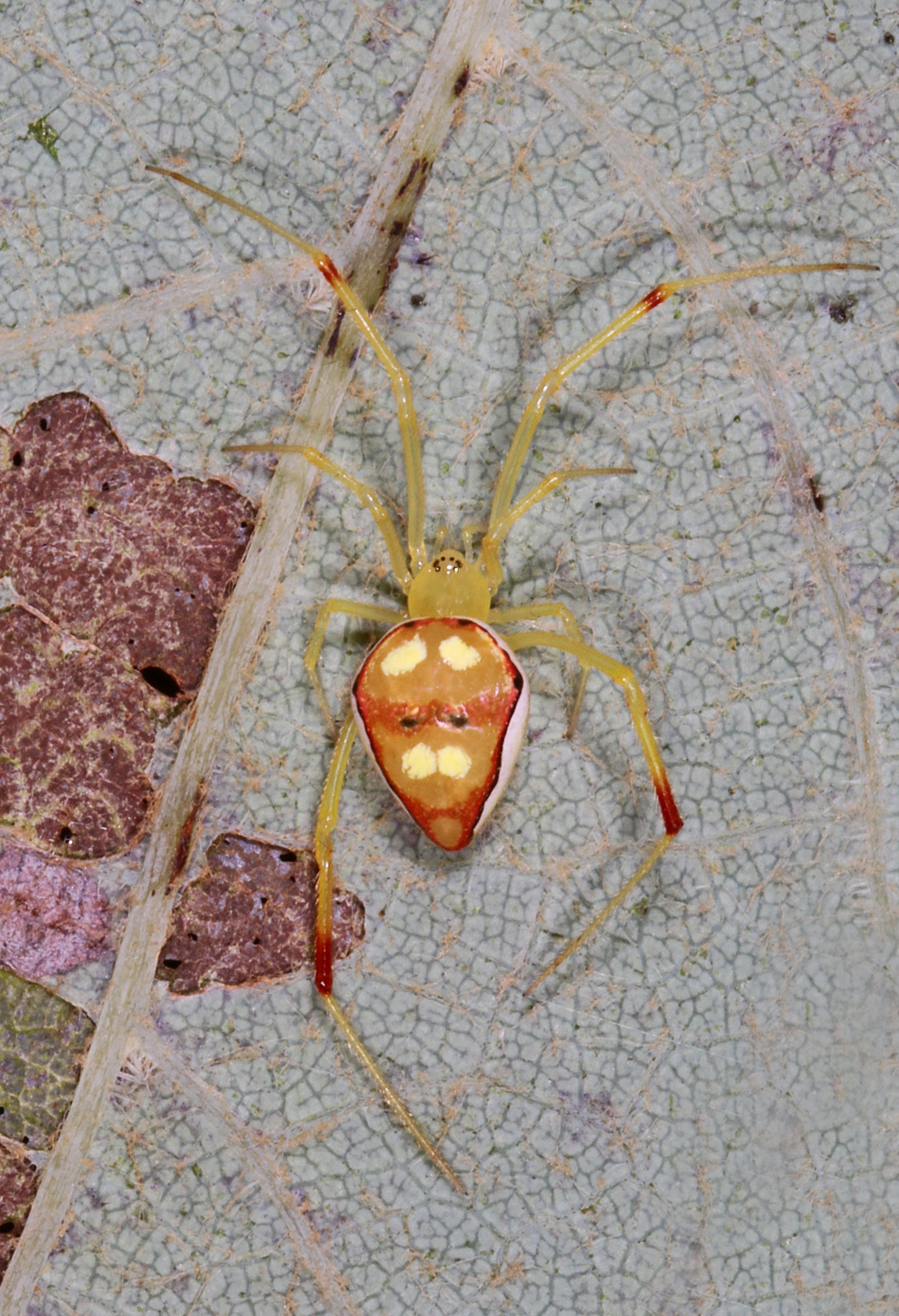

Scientific classification
- Domain: Eukaryota
- Kingdom: Animalia
- Phylum: Arthropoda
- Subphylum: Chelicerata
- Class: Arachnida
- Order: Araneae
- Infraorder: Araneomorphae
- Family: Theridiidae
- Genus: Spintharus
- Species: S. flavidus

Binomial name
- Spintharus flavidus Hentz, 1850

= Spintharus flavidus =

Species of spider

Spintharus flavidus is a species of cobweb spider in the family Theridiidae. It is found in a range from the United States to Bolivia and Brazil.
