= Peter Jäger =

German arachnologist

- Born: Paderborn, Germany
- Education: University of Mainz
- Scientific career
- Fields: Arachnology
- Author abbrev. (zoology): Jäger

Peter Jäger is a German arachnologist, and current Head of Arachnology at the Senckenberg Research Institute and Natural History Museum in Frankfurt, Germany.

He has named several spiders after celebrities; in 2008, he named Heteropoda davidbowie after British singer David Bowie, and Heteropoda ninahagen after German singer Nina Hagen. In 2012, he discovered a new species in a cave in Laos, known colloquially at the time as the Giant Laotian harvestman. In 2013, he named Ctenus monaghani (currently in the genus Bowie) after actor Dominic Monaghan, to honor his work in the documentary series Wild Things with Dominic Monaghan.

In 2020, Jäger named a new genus and species of huntsman spiders from Madagascar after Greta Thunberg. The new spider is named Thunberga greta.

In 2022, he named 54 species of huntsman spiders from across Asia under the new genus Bowie in commemoration of the musician David Bowie 75th's birthday, the second time the musician's name was honored.
