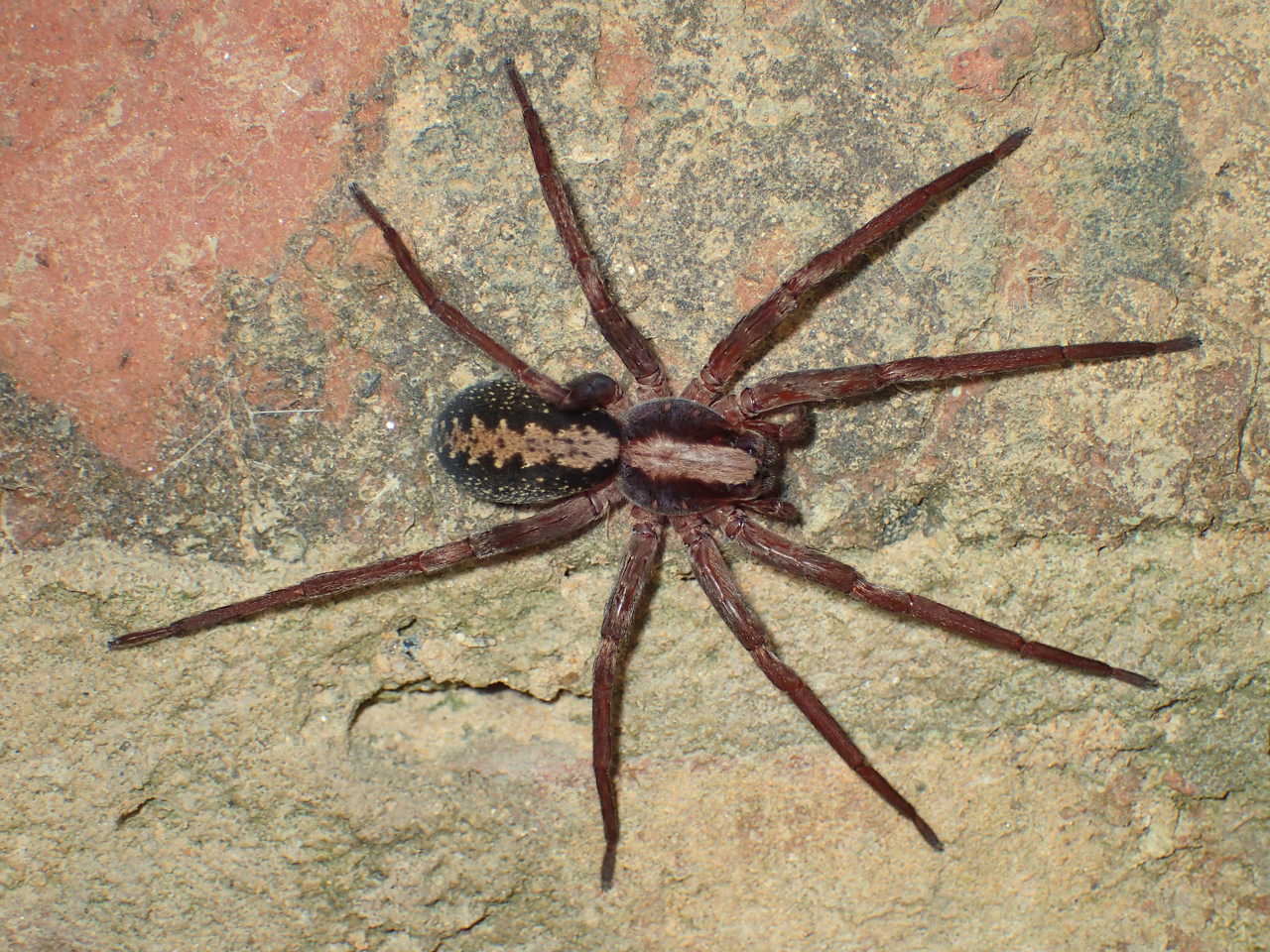

Scientific classification
- Kingdom: Animalia
- Phylum: Arthropoda
- Subphylum: Chelicerata
- Class: Arachnida
- Order: Araneae
- Infraorder: Araneomorphae
- Family: Ctenidae
- Genus: Ctenus
- Species: C. hybernalis

Binomial name
- Ctenus hybernalis Hentz, 1844

= Ctenus hibernalis =

Species of spider

Ctenus hybernalis, Alabama wandering spiders, are wandering spiders (Ctenidae) native to the southeastern United States, primarily Alabama.

== Taxonomy and nomenclature ==
The species was originally described by Nicholas Marcellus Hentz in 1844 as Ctenus hybernalis. In a subsequent work, Nathan Banks (1898) altered the spelling to Ctenus hibernalis without providing a justification for the change; this constitutes an unjustified emendation under zoological nomenclature. The original spelling (*hybernalis*) was occasionally retained, for example by Bishop and Crosby (1926).

Later influential treatments, notably those by Willis J. Gertsch (1935) and William B. Peck (1981), explicitly cited Hentz's original spelling in their taxonomic histories but nevertheless adopted the emended spelling (*hibernalis*) in usage. As a result, *hibernalis* became the prevailing spelling in much of the later literature and in several online databases. As of the mid-2020s, efforts to restore the original spelling (*hybernalis*) have begun to appear in online platforms and curated databases.

== Evolution ==
Molecular phylogenetic analyses indicate that Ctenus hybernalis belongs to a well-supported clade of North American species that is distinct from other members of the genus. This clade includes Ctenus hybernalis (Alabama), Ctenus exlineae (Arkansas), Ctenus captiosus (Florida), Ctenus valverdiensis (Texas), and Ctenus mitchelli (Mexico). Phylogenomic studies consistently recover these taxa as a monophyletic group, suggesting a single colonization event of the genus into the United States.

== Distribution ==
The species is found in the southeastern United States and is known almost exclusively from Alabama, with a small number of records from neighboring Georgia.

== Habitat ==
Ctenus hybernalis is typically observed in rocky mixed woodlands, often near streams or other sources of water. It has occasionally been recorded entering human structures, based on observation data.
