= C. mitchellii =

C. mitchelli may refer to:

- Charaxes mitchelli, a butterfly species in the genus Charaxes
- Crotalus mitchellii, a snake species
- Ctenus mitchelli, Gertsch, 1971, a spider species in the genus Ctenus and the family Ctenidae found in Mexico

== See also ==
- Mitchellii
