= Ctenus vespertilio =

Scientific classification
- Domain: Eukaryota
- Kingdom: Animalia
- Phylum: Arthropoda
- Subphylum: Chelicerata
- Class: Arachnida
- Order: Araneae
- Infraorder: Araneomorphae
- Family: Ctenidae
- Genus: Ctenus
- Species: C. vespertilio

Binomial name
- Ctenus vespertilio Cândido Firmino de Mello-Leitão, 1941

Species of spider

Ctenus vespertilio is a species of spider from the family Ctenidae. The scientific name of this species was first published in 1941 by Cândido Firmino de Mello-Leitão, found in Colombia.
