= Ctenus spectabilis =

Tropical Wolf Spider

Conservation status
- Least Concern (SANBI Red List)

Scientific classification
- Kingdom: Animalia
- Phylum: Arthropoda
- Subphylum: Chelicerata
- Class: Arachnida
- Order: Araneae
- Infraorder: Araneomorphae
- Family: Ctenidae
- Genus: Ctenus
- Species: C. spectabilis

Binomial name
- Ctenus spectabilis Lessert, 1921

Species of spider

Ctenus spectabilis is a species of spider in the family Ctenidae. It occurs in eastern Africa and is commonly known as the tropical wolf spider.

== Distribution ==
Ctenus spectabilis is found in Tanzania, Uganda, the Democratic Republic of the Congo, and South Africa. In South Africa, the species is known only from the Northern Cape province at Benfontein Nature Reserve.

== Habitat and ecology ==
The species is a free-living ground dweller that was sampled with pitfall traps from the Grassland biome, at an altitude of 1,172 m above sea level.

== Description ==
Ctenus spectabilis is known from both sexes.

== Conservation ==
Ctenus spectabilis is listed as Least Concern by the South African National Biodiversity Institute due to its wide geographical range. The species is protected in Benfontein Nature Reserve.

== Taxonomy ==
The species was originally described by Roger de Lessert in 1921 from Tanzania. It was revised by Pierre Benoit in 1979.
