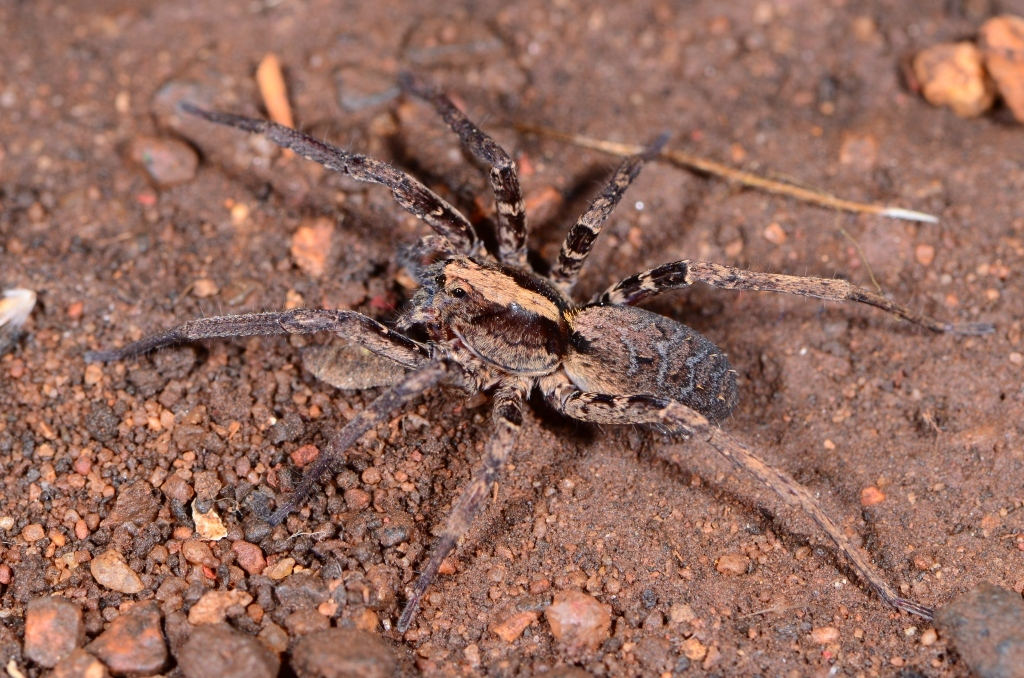
- Female
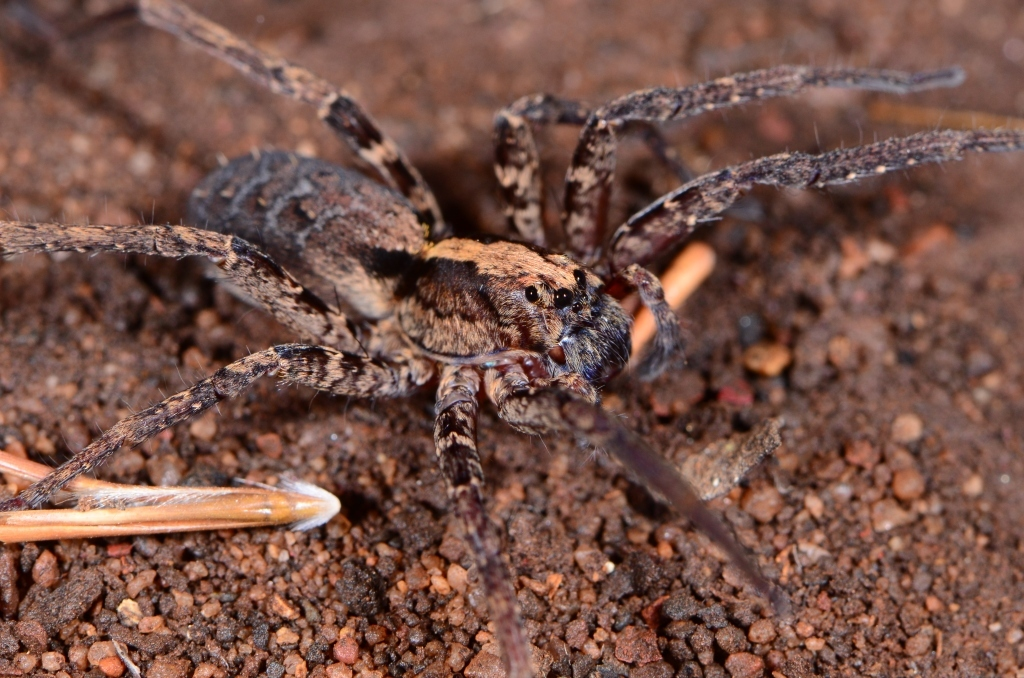
- Female

Scientific classification
- Kingdom: Animalia
- Phylum: Arthropoda
- Subphylum: Chelicerata
- Class: Arachnida
- Order: Araneae
- Infraorder: Araneomorphae
- Family: Ctenidae
- Genus: Ctenus
- Species: C. transvaalensis

Binomial name
- Ctenus transvaalensis Benoit, 1981

= Ctenus transvaalensis =

Transvaal Tropical Wolf Spider

Species of spider

Ctenus transvaalensis is a species of spider in the family Ctenidae. It is endemic to South Africa and is commonly known as the Transvaal tropical wandering spider (or Transvaal tropical wolf spider but which may confuse with distant relatives in the family Lycosidae).

== Distribution ==
Ctenus transvaalensis is found only in South Africa across the provinces Gauteng, KwaZulu-Natal, Limpopo, and Mpumalanga. The species has been recorded from six protected areas including Kruger National Park and Lekgalameetse Nature Reserve.

== Habitat and ecology ==
The species is a ground dweller living in burrows without trapdoors in the Savanna and Grassland biomes, at altitudes ranging from 256 to 1,516 m above sea level.

== Description ==
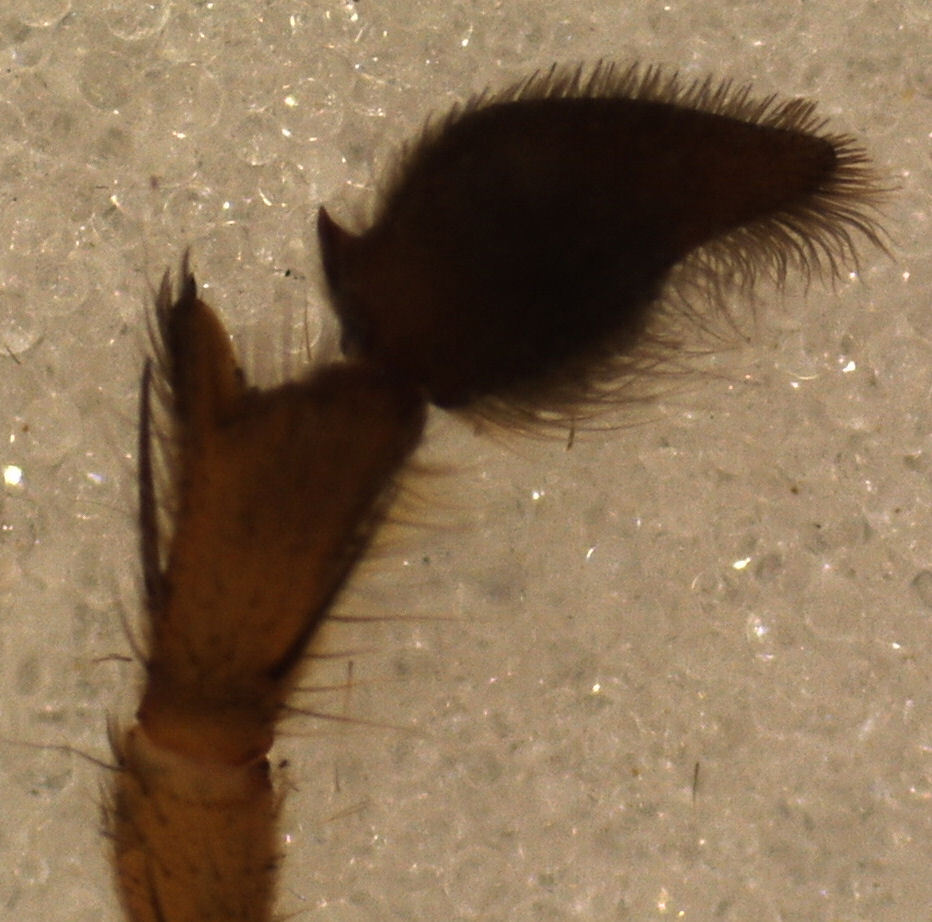

== Conservation ==
Ctenus transvaalensis is listed as Least Concern by the South African National Biodiversity Institute due to its wide geographical distribution. The species is protected in six protected areas including Lekgalameetse Nature Reserve, Kruger National Park, and Blouberg Nature Reserve.

== Taxonomy ==
The species was originally described by Pierre Benoit in 1981 from a male collected at Woodbush in Limpopo. This is possibly the male of Ctenus gulosus Arts, 1912.
