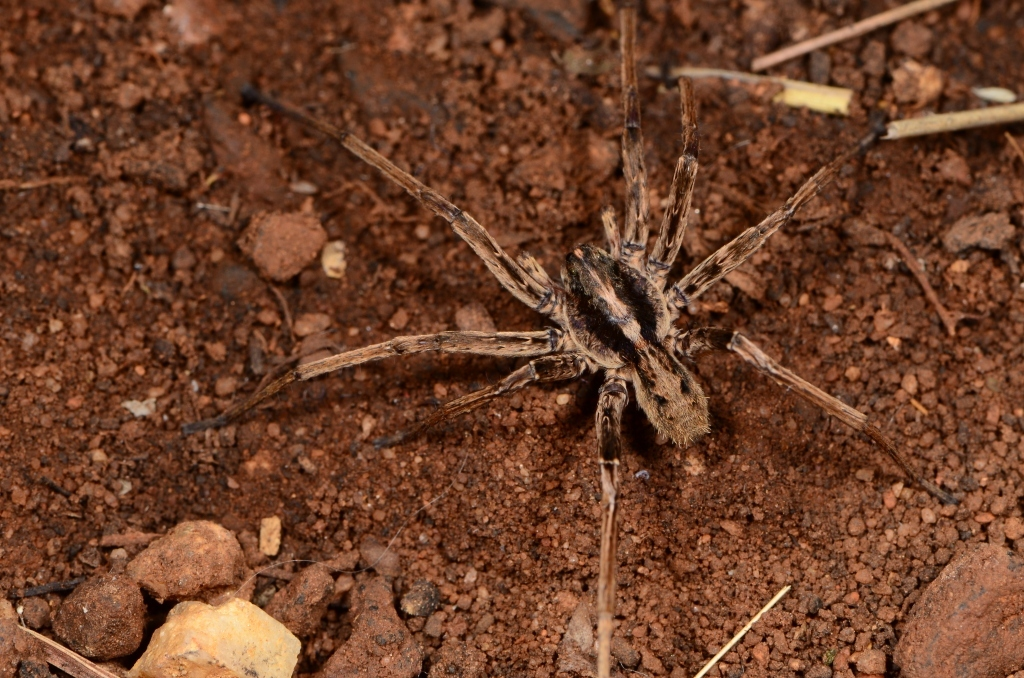
- Male
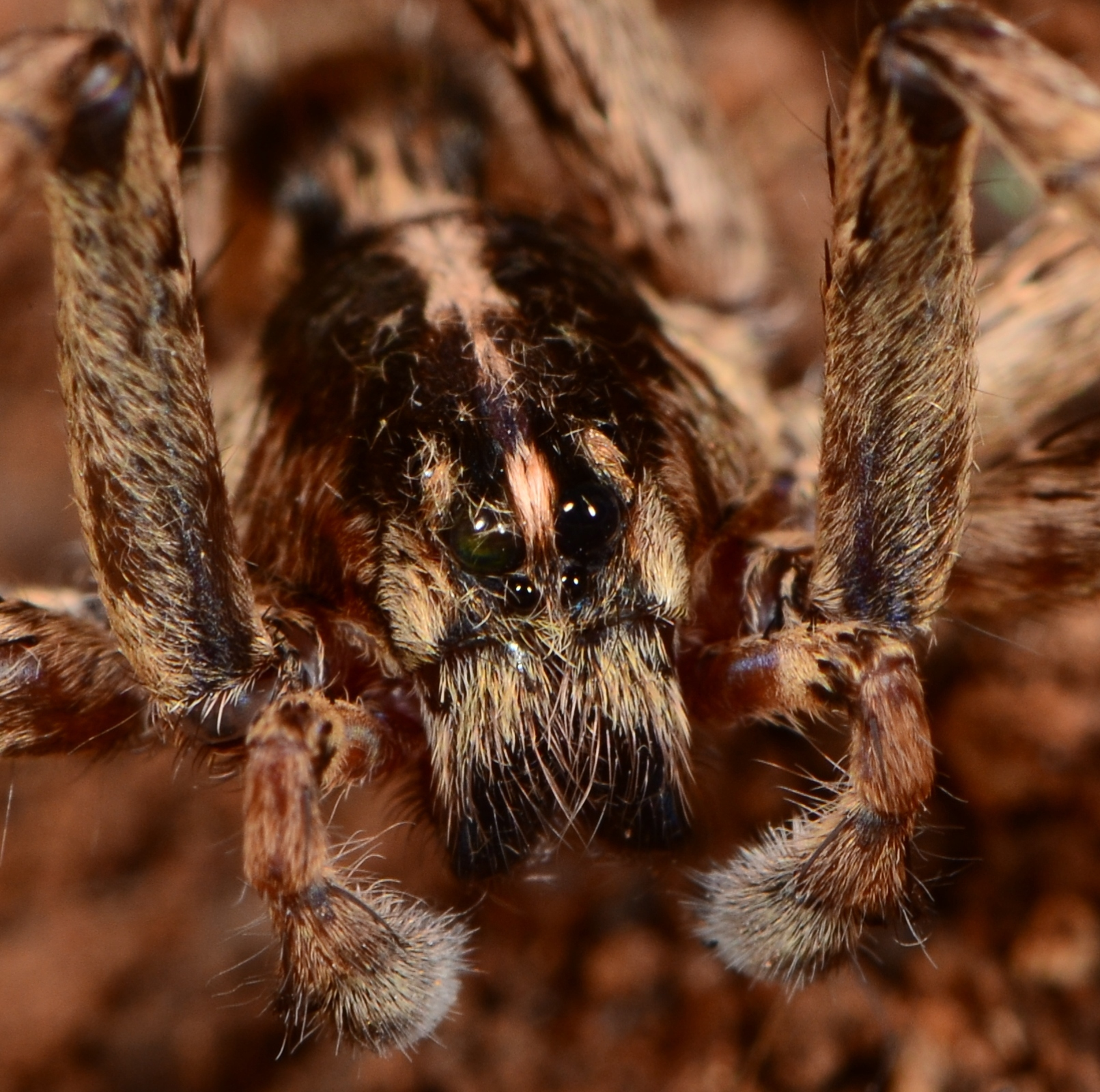
- Male

Scientific classification
- Kingdom: Animalia
- Phylum: Arthropoda
- Subphylum: Chelicerata
- Class: Arachnida
- Order: Araneae
- Infraorder: Araneomorphae
- Family: Ctenidae
- Genus: Ctenus
- Species: C. caligineus

Binomial name
- Ctenus caligineus Arts, 1912

Synonyms
- Anahita kiwuensis Strand, 1916

= Ctenus caligineus =

Zaire Tropical Wolf Spider

Species of spider

Ctenus caligineus is a species of spider in the family Ctenidae. It is found in central and southern Africa and is commonly known as the Zaire tropical wolf spider.

== Distribution ==
Ctenus caligineus is found in the Democratic Republic of the Congo, Burundi, and South Africa. In South Africa, the species has been recorded from Limpopo province, including the Lekgalameetse Nature Reserve.

== Habitat and ecology ==
The species is a free-running ground dweller known from the Savanna biome, at altitudes ranging from 574 to 1,002 m above sea level.

== Description ==
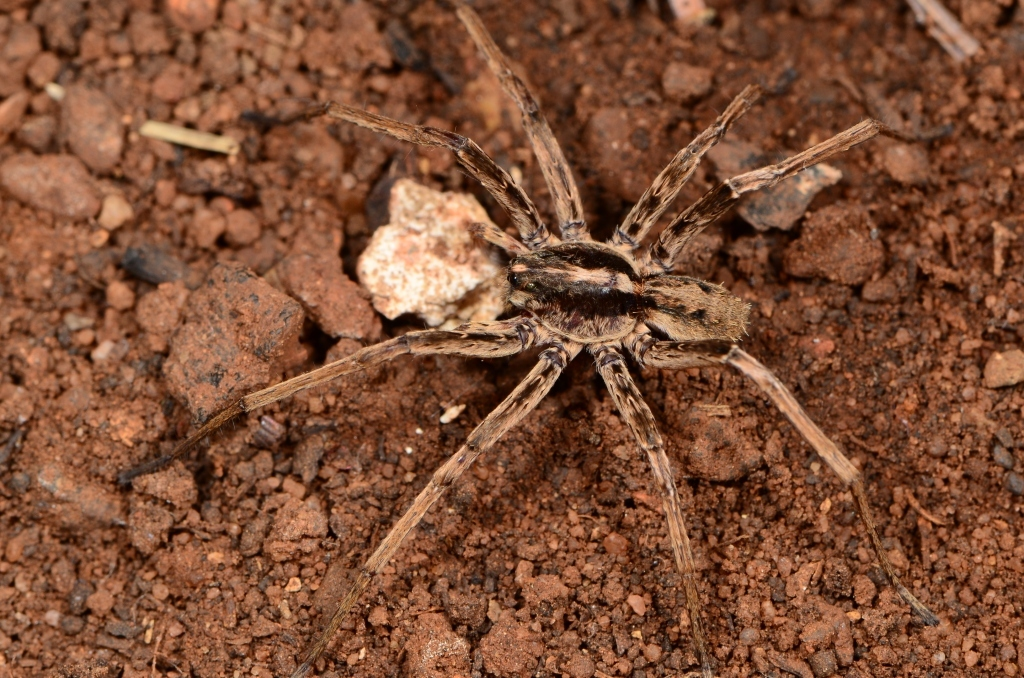
male

Ctenus caligineus is known from both sexes. It belongs to the genus Ctenus, which is characterized by strong and stout legs with spines, anterior tibiae with 3–6 pairs of ventral spines, and tarsi with two claws.

== Conservation ==
Ctenus caligineus is listed as Least Concern by the South African National Biodiversity Institute due to its wide geographical range. The species receives some protection in the Lekgalameetse Nature Reserve.

== Taxonomy ==
The species was originally described by L. des Arts in 1912 from Zaïre. It was later revised by Pierre Benoit in 1977, who synonymized Anahita kiwuensis Strand, 1916 with this species.
