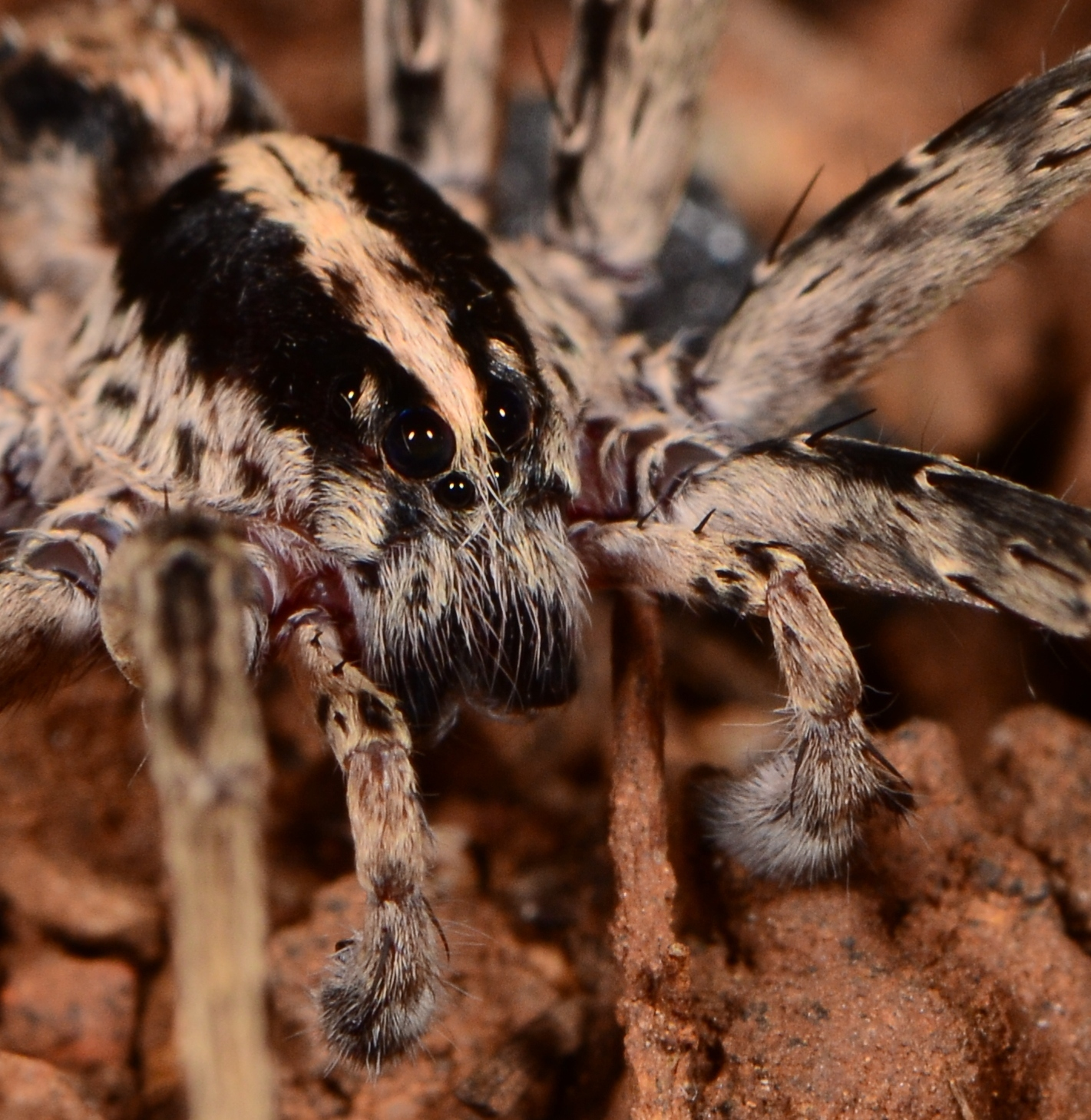
- Male
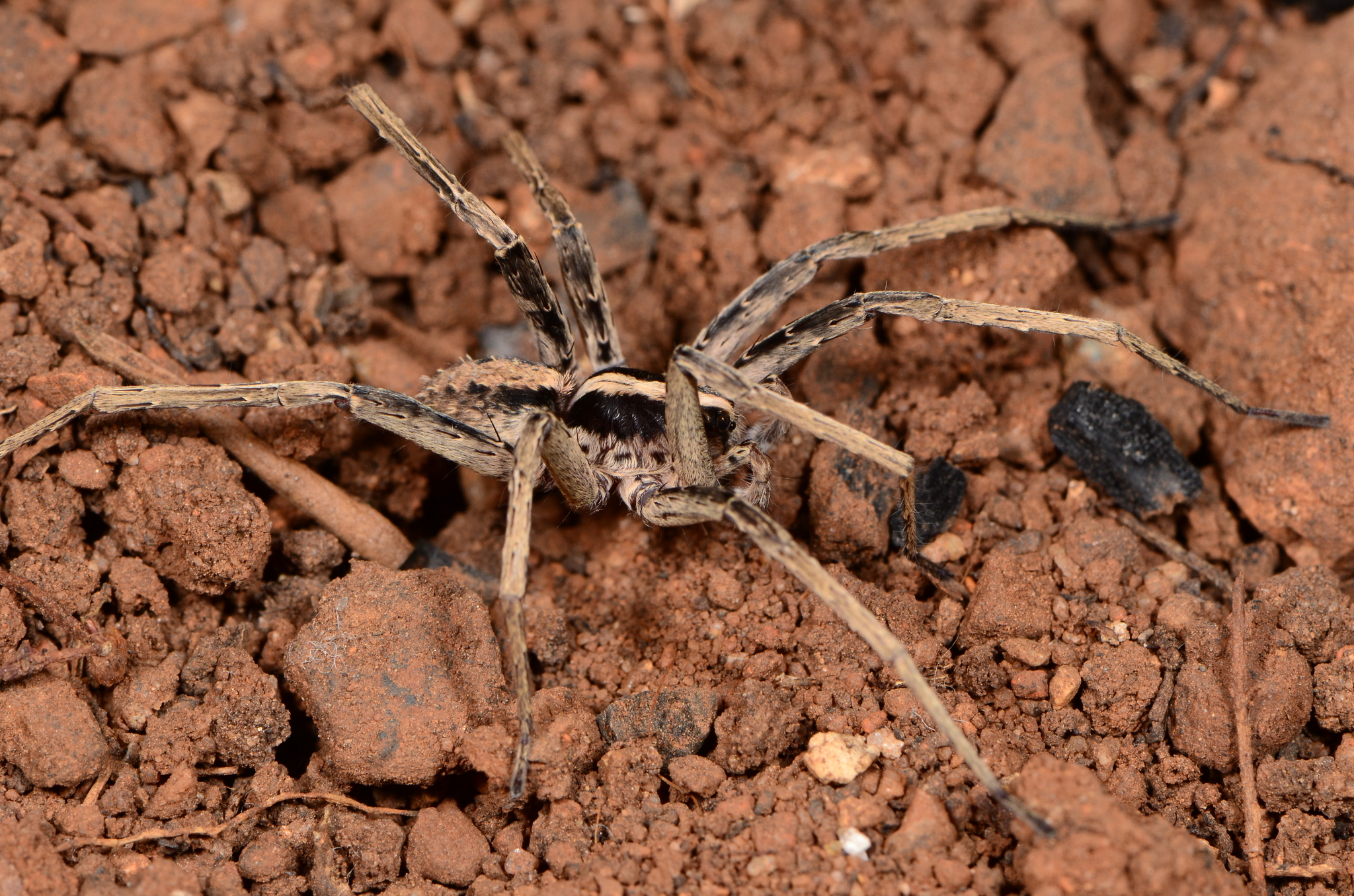

Scientific classification
- Kingdom: Animalia
- Phylum: Arthropoda
- Subphylum: Chelicerata
- Class: Arachnida
- Order: Araneae
- Infraorder: Araneomorphae
- Family: Ctenidae
- Genus: Ctenus
- Species: C. gulosus

Binomial name
- Ctenus gulosus Arts, 1912

Synonyms
- Ctenus adumbratus Arts, 1912; Ctenus frivolus Arts, 1912

= Ctenus gulosus =

Species of spider

Ctenus gulosus is a species of spider in the family Ctenidae. It is endemic to South Africa.

== Distribution ==
Ctenus gulosus is found only in South Africa across four provinces: Eastern Cape, KwaZulu-Natal, Mpumalanga, and Limpopo. The species has been recorded from numerous protected areas including Addo Elephant National Park, Kruger National Park, and Tembe Elephant Park.

== Habitat and ecology ==
The species is a ground dweller sampled in pitfall traps from the Forest, Indian Ocean Coastal Belt, and Savanna biomes, at altitudes ranging from 17 to 1,551 m above sea level.

== Description ==
Ctenus gulosus is known only from females. This species is possibly the female of Ctenus transvaalensis Benoit, 1981.

== Conservation ==
Ctenus gulosus is listed as Least Concern by the South African National Biodiversity Institute due to its wide geographical range. The species is protected in ten protected areas including Ndumo Game Reserve, Addo Elephant National Park, and Kruger National Park.

== Taxonomy ==
The species was originally described by L. des Arts in 1912 from Durban. Pierre Benoit in 1979 synonymized Ctenus adumbratus Arts, 1912 and C. frivolus Arts, 1912 with this species.
