= Ctenus parvoculatus =

Cave Tropical Wolf Spider

Conservation status
- Least Concern (SANBI Red List)

Scientific classification
- Kingdom: Animalia
- Phylum: Arthropoda
- Subphylum: Chelicerata
- Class: Arachnida
- Order: Araneae
- Infraorder: Araneomorphae
- Family: Ctenidae
- Genus: Ctenus
- Species: C. parvoculatus

Binomial name
- Ctenus parvoculatus Benoit, 1979

Species of spider

Ctenus parvoculatus is a species of spider in the family Ctenidae. It is endemic to South Africa and is commonly known as the cave tropical wolf spider.

== Distribution ==
Ctenus parvoculatus is found only in South Africa across five provinces: Eastern Cape, KwaZulu-Natal, Limpopo, Mpumalanga, and Western Cape. Notable locations include Table Mountain National Park, Kosi Bay Nature Reserve, and various cave systems.

== Habitat and ecology ==
The species is known from caves and forest areas in the Fynbos, Forest, Grassland, Indian Ocean Coastal Belt, Savanna, and Thicket biomes, at altitudes ranging from 7 to 1,583 m above sea level.

== Description ==
Ctenus parvoculatus is known only from females.

== Conservation ==
Ctenus parvoculatus is listed as Least Concern by the South African National Biodiversity Institute due to its wide geographical distribution. There are no known threats to the species. The species is protected in three protected areas: Table Mountain National Park, Nkandla Forest, and Kosi Bay Nature Reserve.

== Taxonomy ==
The species was originally described by Pierre Benoit in 1979 from the Table Mountain Echo Hall Caves.
