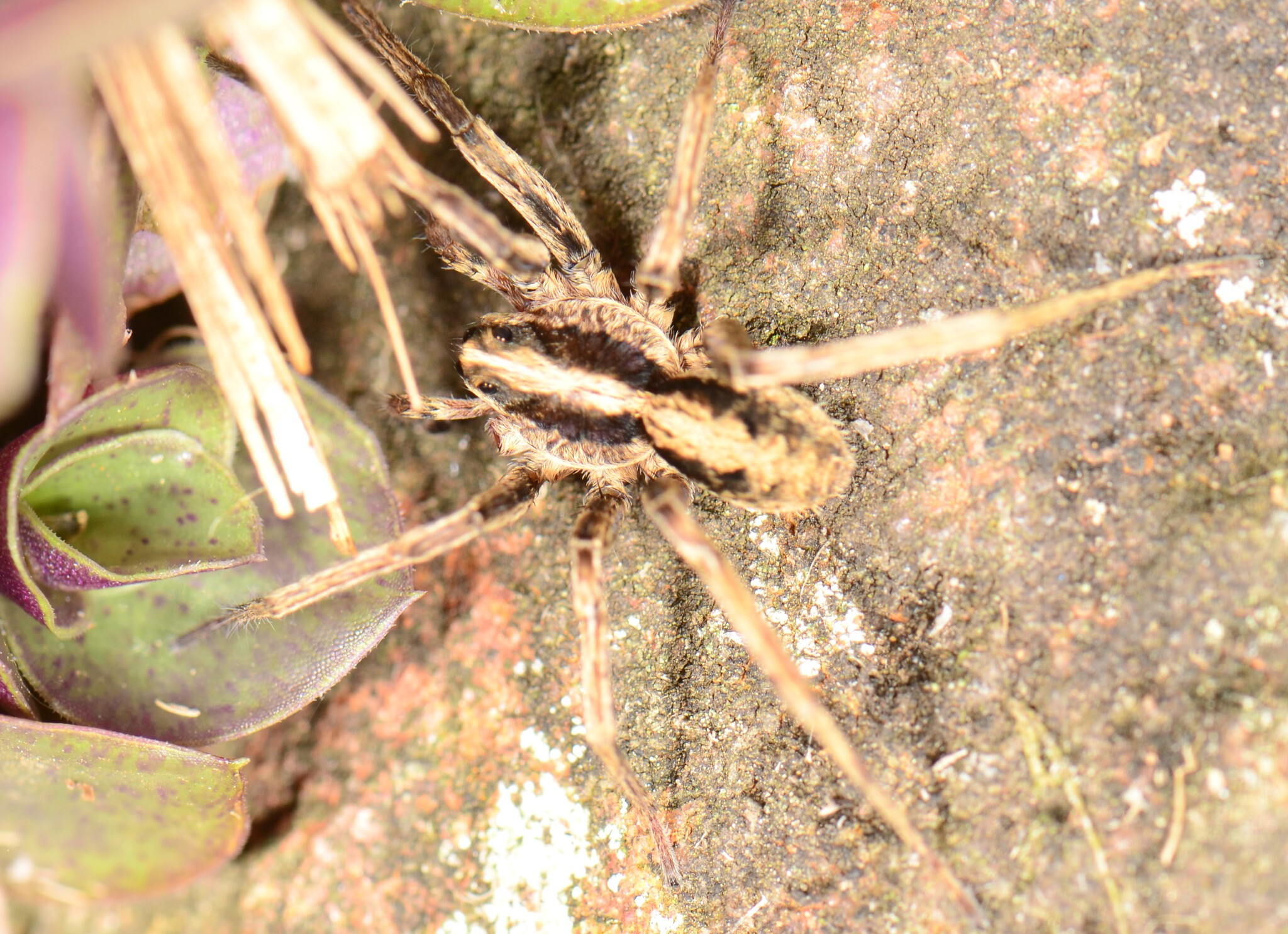
- Male
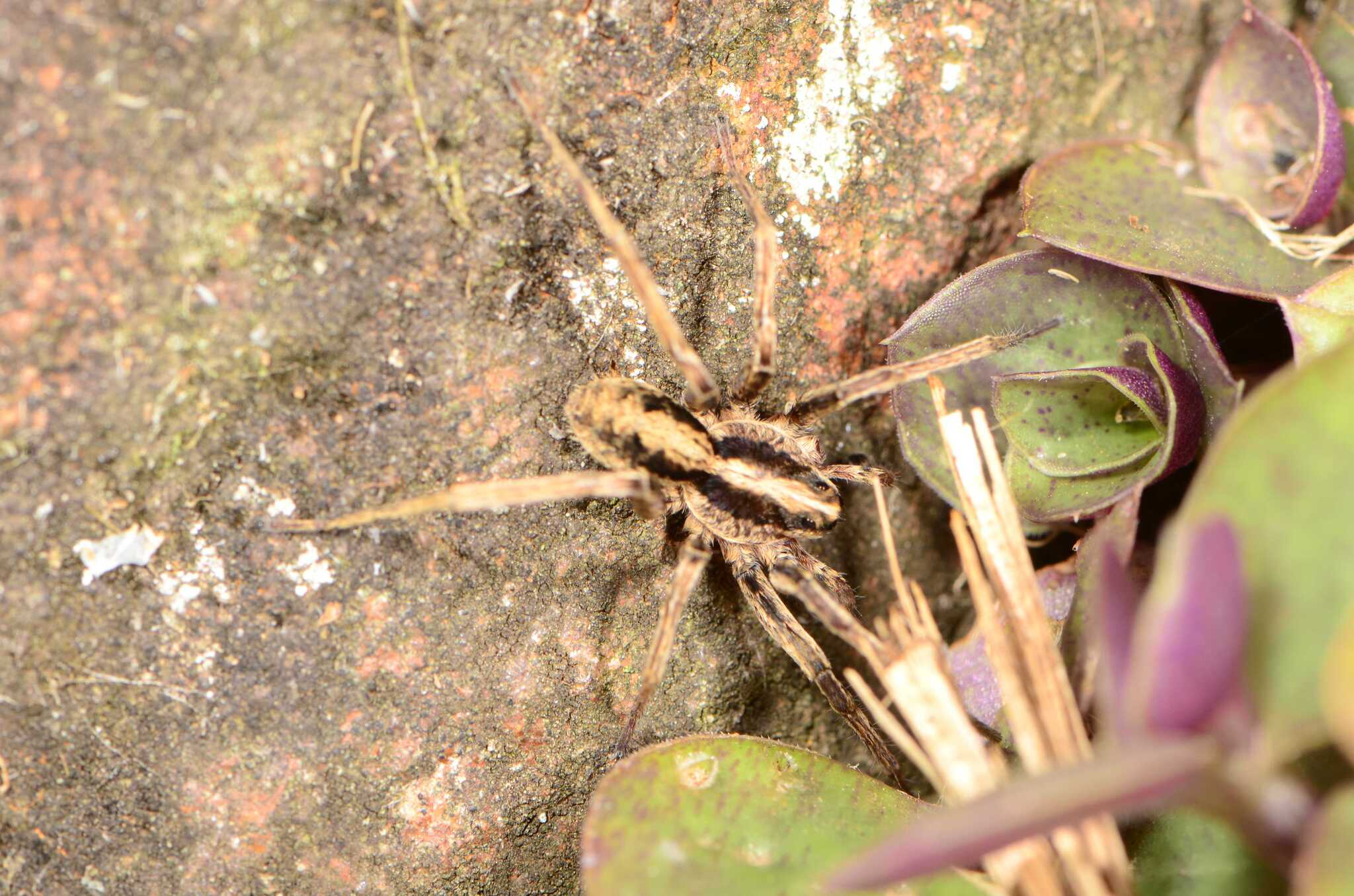
- Male

Scientific classification
- Kingdom: Animalia
- Phylum: Arthropoda
- Subphylum: Chelicerata
- Class: Arachnida
- Order: Araneae
- Infraorder: Araneomorphae
- Family: Ctenidae
- Genus: Ctenus
- Species: C. pulchriventris

Binomial name
- Ctenus pulchriventris (Simon, 1897)

Synonyms
- Ctenus spenceri F. O. Pickard-Cambridge, 1898; Ctenus herbigradus Arts, 1912; Ctenus spenceri herbigradus Lawrence, 1947

= Ctenus pulchriventris =

Tropical Wolf Spider

Species of spider

Ctenus pulchriventris is a species of spider in the family Ctenidae. It occurs in southern Africa and is commonly known as the tropical wolf spider.

It is the dominant wandering spider found in Afromontane forests in KwaZulu-Natal.

== Distribution ==
Ctenus pulchriventris is found in Zimbabwe and South Africa. In South Africa, the species has been recorded from the provinces Eastern Cape, Limpopo, Mpumalanga, and KwaZulu-Natal.

== Habitat and ecology ==
The species is a ground dweller sampled in pitfall traps in the Forest, Indian Ocean Coastal Belt, Savanna, and Thicket biomes, at altitudes ranging from 7 to 1,583 m above sea level. It has also been collected in agricultural crops such as citrus, maize, pine plantations, and strawberries.

== Description ==
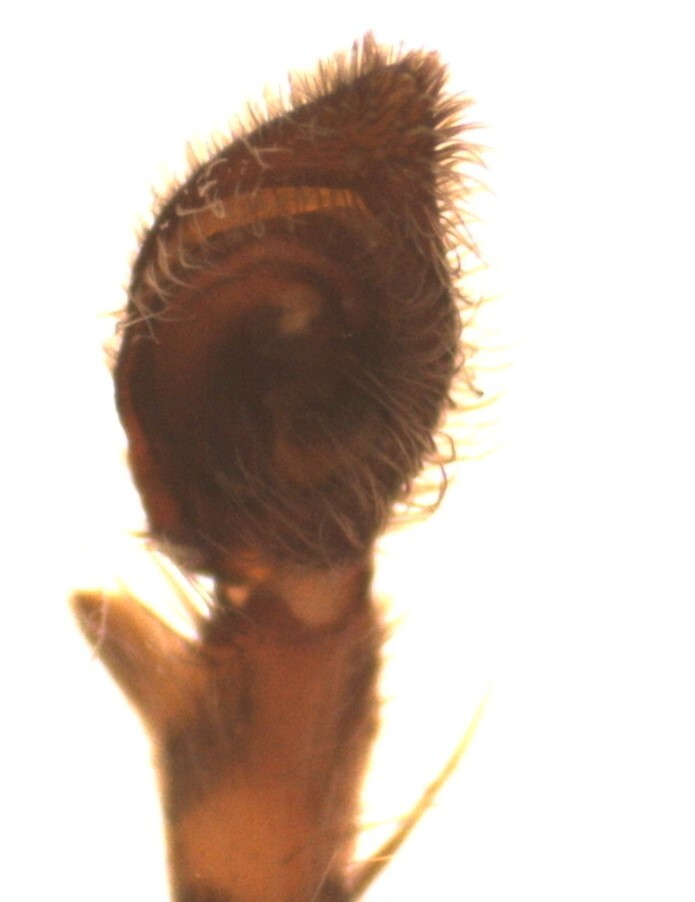

== Conservation ==
Ctenus pulchriventris is listed as Least Concern by the South African National Biodiversity Institute due to its wide geographical range. The species is protected in areas such as Lekgalameetse Nature Reserve and Blouberg Nature Reserve.

== Taxonomy ==
The species was originally described by Eugène Simon in 1897 from Zimbabwe. Pierre Benoit in 1979 synonymized Ctenus spenceri F. O. Pickard-Cambridge, 1898 and C. spenceri herbigradus Lawrence, 1947 with this species.
