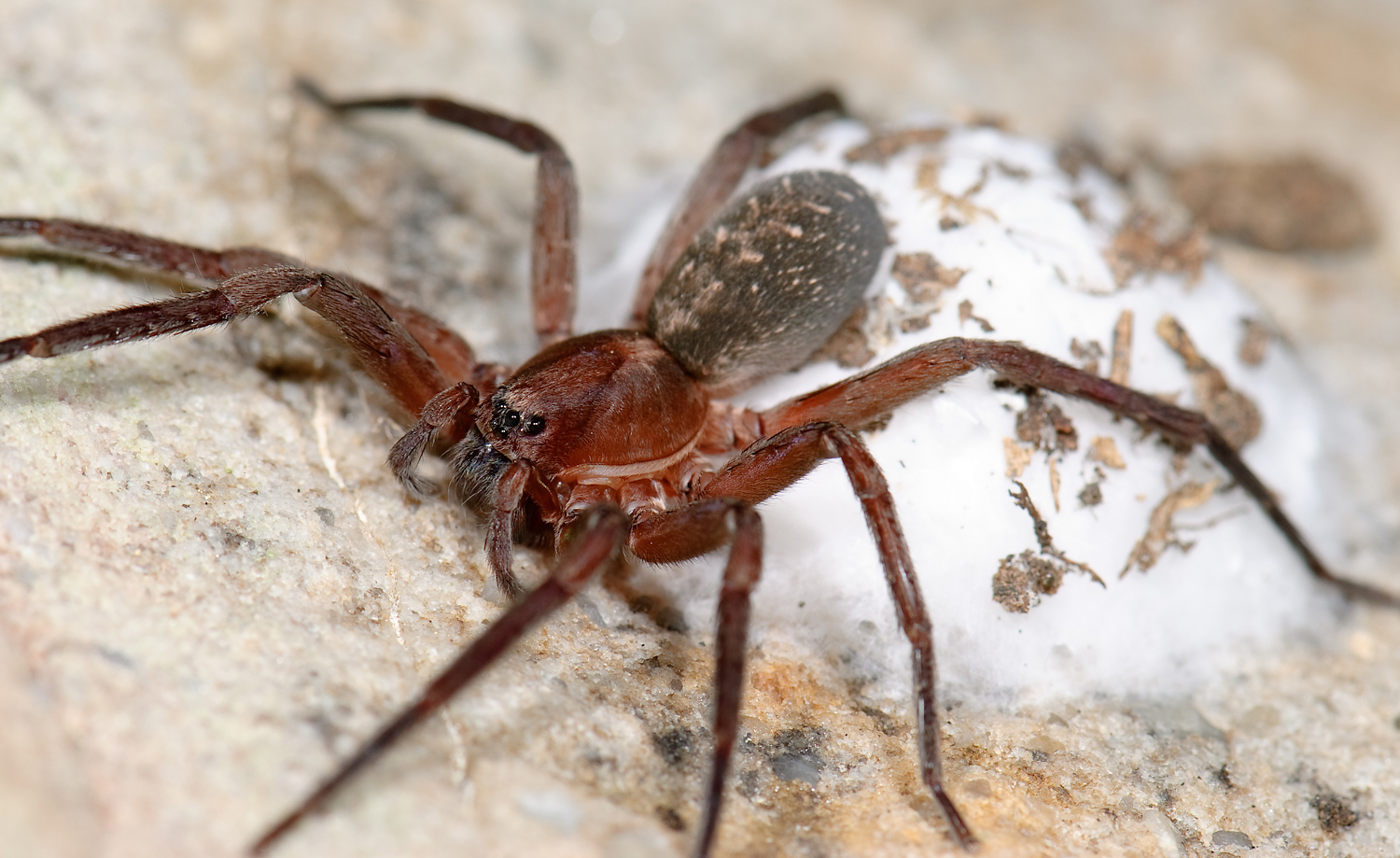

Scientific classification
- Domain: Eukaryota
- Kingdom: Animalia
- Phylum: Arthropoda
- Subphylum: Chelicerata
- Class: Arachnida
- Order: Araneae
- Infraorder: Araneomorphae
- Family: Ctenidae
- Genus: Ctenus
- Species: C. exlineae

Binomial name
- Ctenus exlineae Peck, 1981

= Ctenus exlineae =

Species of spider

Ctenus exlineae is a species of wandering spider in the family Ctenidae. It is found in the United States.

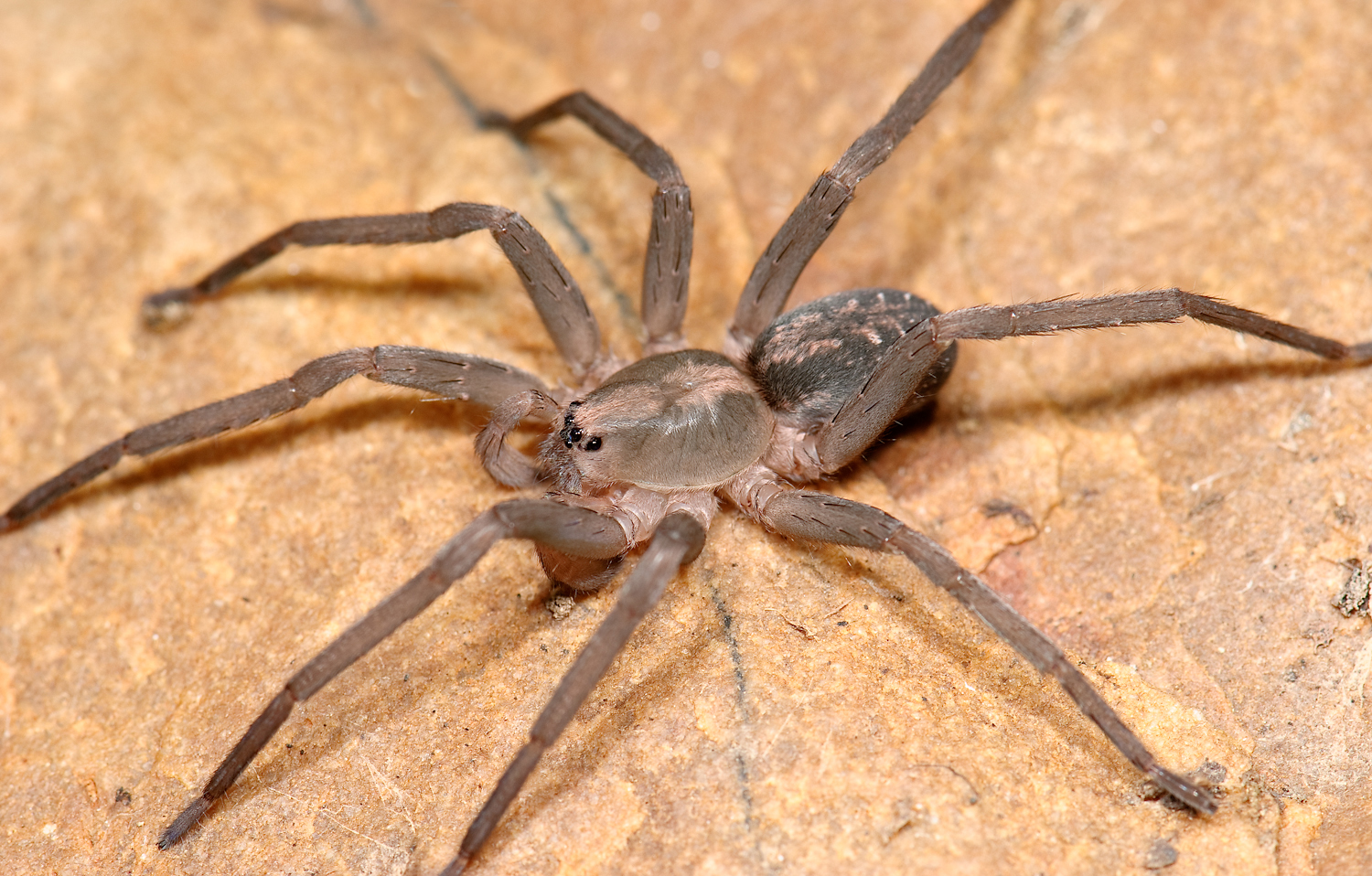
