= Ctenus captiosus =

Scientific classification
- Kingdom: Animalia
- Phylum: Arthropoda
- Subphylum: Chelicerata
- Class: Arachnida
- Order: Araneae
- Infraorder: Araneomorphae
- Family: Ctenidae
- Genus: Ctenus
- Species: C. captiosus

Binomial name
- Ctenus captiosus Gertsch, 1935

Species of spider

Ctenus captiosus, known generally as the Florida false wolf spider or tropical wolf spider, is a species of wandering spider in the family Ctenidae. It is found in the United States, and is one of two species of Ctenidae occurring in Florida. Little is known about the biology of this species.

== Description ==
The body length (excluding legs) of a male is 10–14 mm (0.39–0.55 in), and for females 10–15 mm (0.39–0.59 in). The leg span may be as long as 75 mm (3.0 in). The abdomen is a yellow-gray except for a pale median band consisting of a series of connected triangles edged by brown. The dorsal surface of the legs are dark like the carapace, but the underside of the legs and sternum are much paler, almost yellow. They prefer mesic habitats, and are most commonly seen in the springtime, presumably as they are searching for mates as the weather warms. Generally, C. captiosus can be found in both oak and pine trees, leaf litter, and caves. Ctenus captiosus has also appeared in large numbers in summer in pond pine and sand pine scrub, and in the fall in flatwoods.

== Toxicology ==
A study conducted by researchers at Lewis & Clark College on a single female C. captiosus found that it carried a total venom protein of 604.25. It has been reported that a bite from this species is described as a needle-like puncture with subsequent swelling about the site, nausea, dizziness, and flulike symptoms that persist for several days. Another case implicated a cause of a necrotic bite, although evidence was circumstantial and an assay of the venom did not find Sphingomyelin phosphodiesterase D.

While there have been reports of bites being harmful to humans, there is no substantial research or evidence that supports this.
