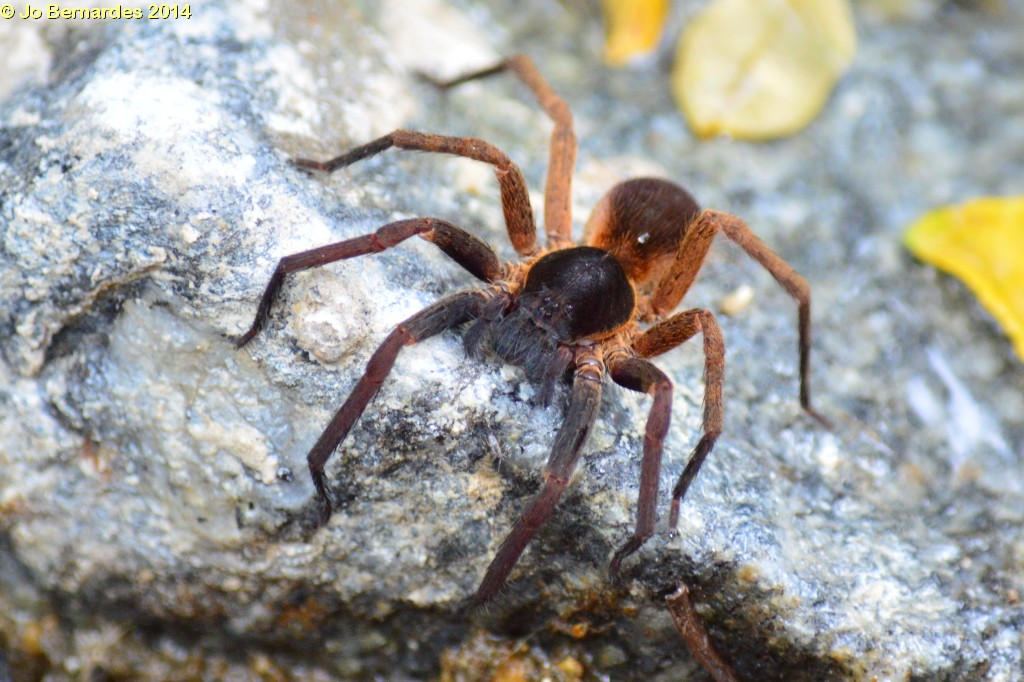
- Ctenus medius
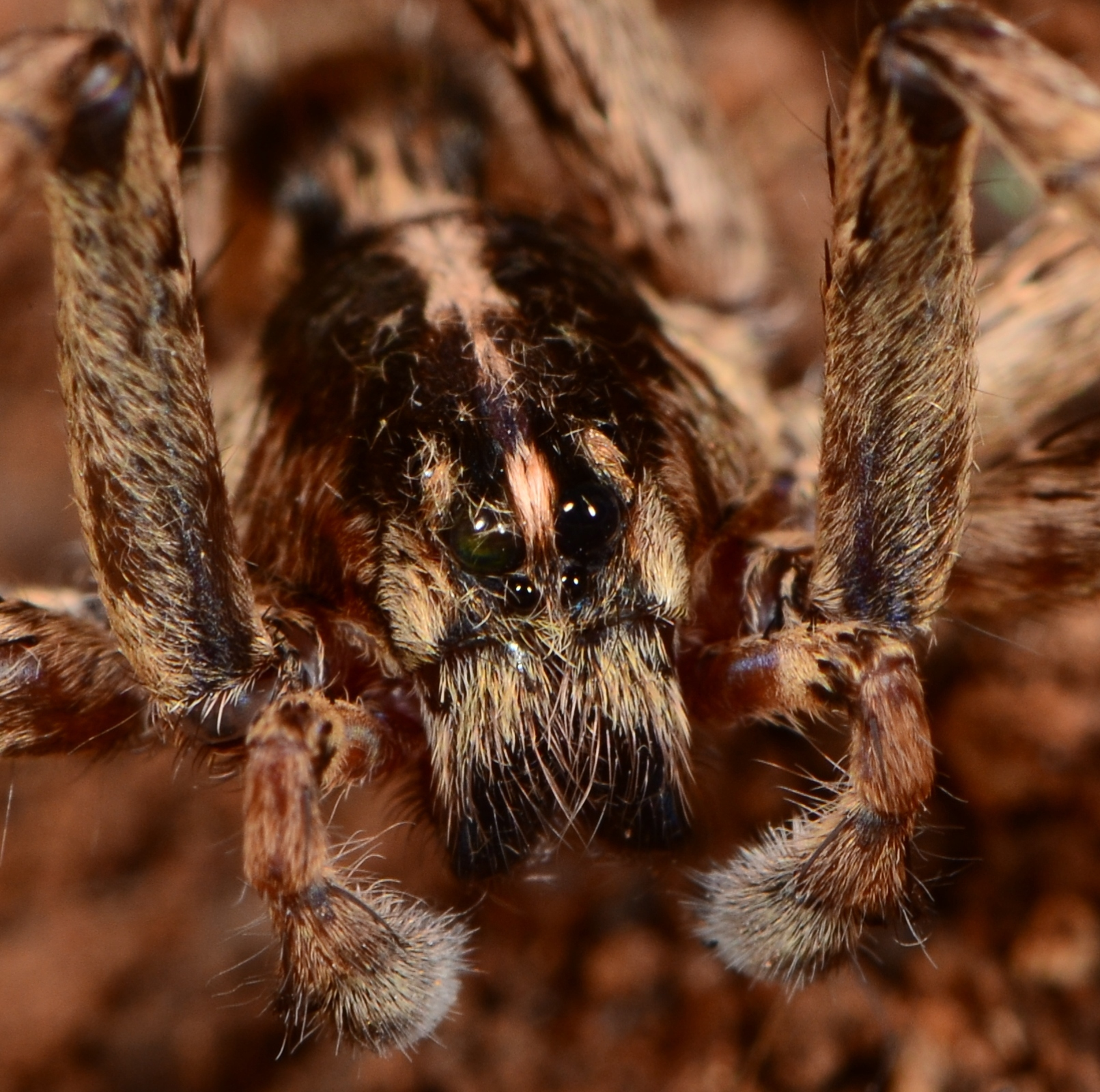
- Male C. caligineus

Scientific classification
- Kingdom: Animalia
- Phylum: Arthropoda
- Subphylum: Chelicerata
- Class: Arachnida
- Order: Araneae
- Infraorder: Araneomorphae
- Family: Ctenidae
- Genus: Ctenus; Walckenaer, 1805

Type species
- C. dubius Walckenaer, 1805

Species
- 157, see text

Synonyms
- Oligoctenus Simon, 1887

= Ctenus =

Genus of spiders

Ctenus is a genus of wandering spiders first described by Charles Athanase Walckenaer in 1805. It is widely distributed, from South America through Africa to East Asia.

== Venom ==
Little is known about the toxic potential of the genus Ctenus; however, Ctenus medius has been shown to share some toxic properties with Phoneutria nigriventer, such as proteolytic, hyaluronidase and phospholipase activities, in addition to producing hyperalgesia and edema.

The venom of C. medius also interferes with the complement system in concentrations in which the venom of P. nigriventer is inactive, indicating that some species in the genus may have a medically significant venom. The venom of C. medius interferes with the complement component 3 (C3) of the complement system; it affects the central factor of the cascades of the complement, and interferes with the lytic activity of this system, which causes stronger activation and consumption of the complement components. Unlike C. medius, the venom of P. nigriventer does not interfere with lytic activity.

== Species ==
As of October 2025, this genus includes 155 species.

These are species with an article on Wikipedia:

- Ctenus caligineus Arts, 1912 – DR Congo, Burundi, South Africa
- Ctenus captiosus Gertsch, 1935 – United States
- Ctenus exlineae Peck, 1981 – United States
- Ctenus gulosus Arts, 1912 – South Africa
- Ctenus parvoculatus Benoit, 1979 – South Africa
- Ctenus pulchriventris (Simon, 1897) – Zimbabwe, South Africa
- Ctenus spectabilis Lessert, 1921 – DR Congo, Uganda, Tanzania, South Africa
- Ctenus transvaalensis Benoit, 1981 – South Africa
- Ctenus vespertilio Mello-Leitão, 1941 – Colombia
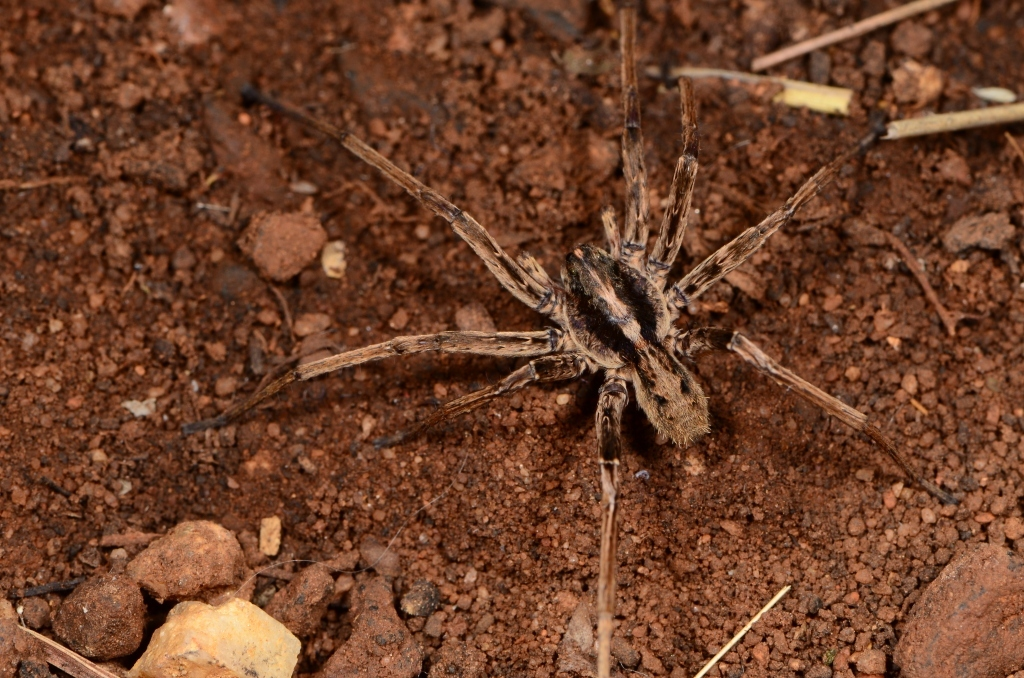
male C. caligineus

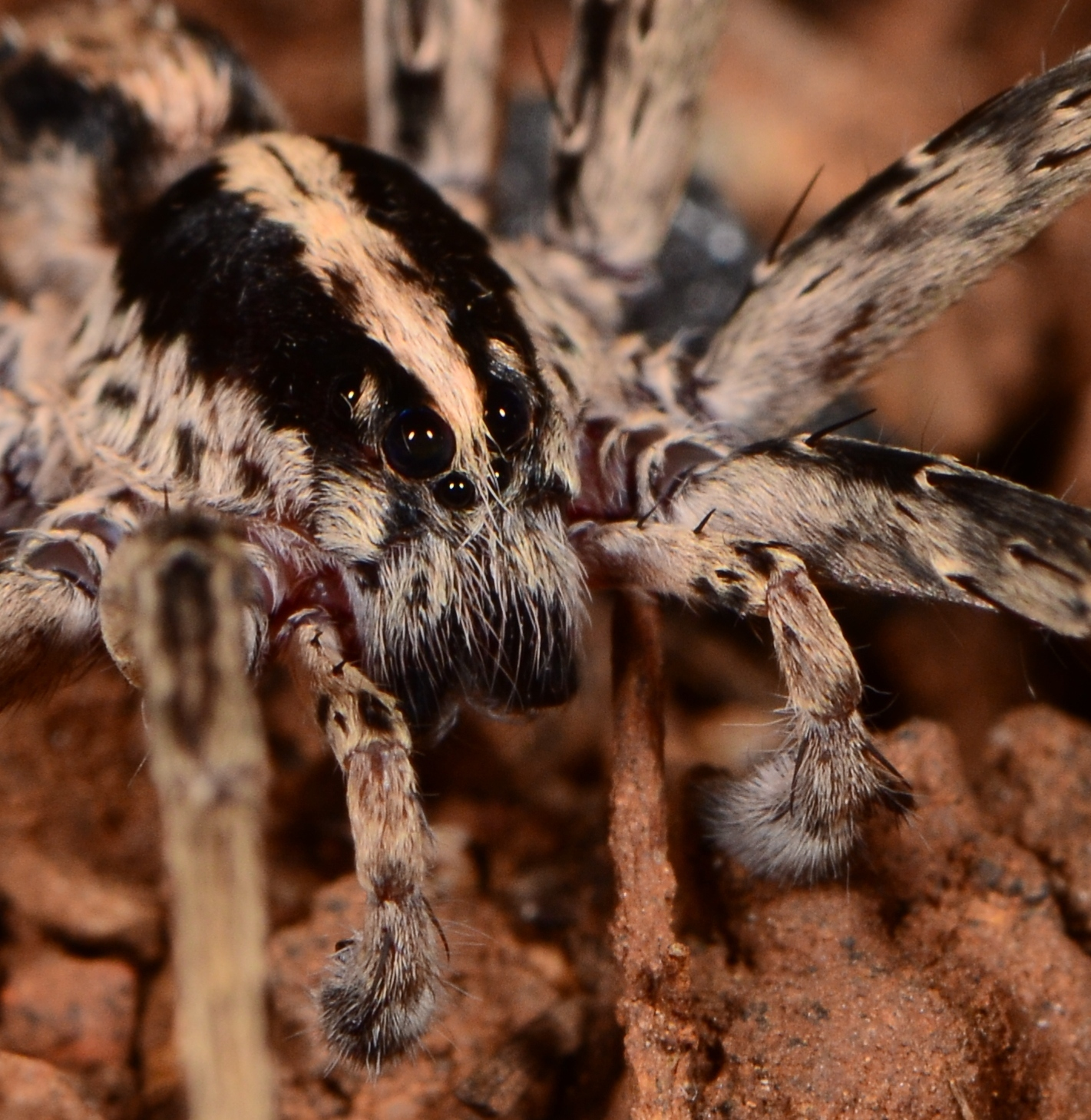
male C. gulosus

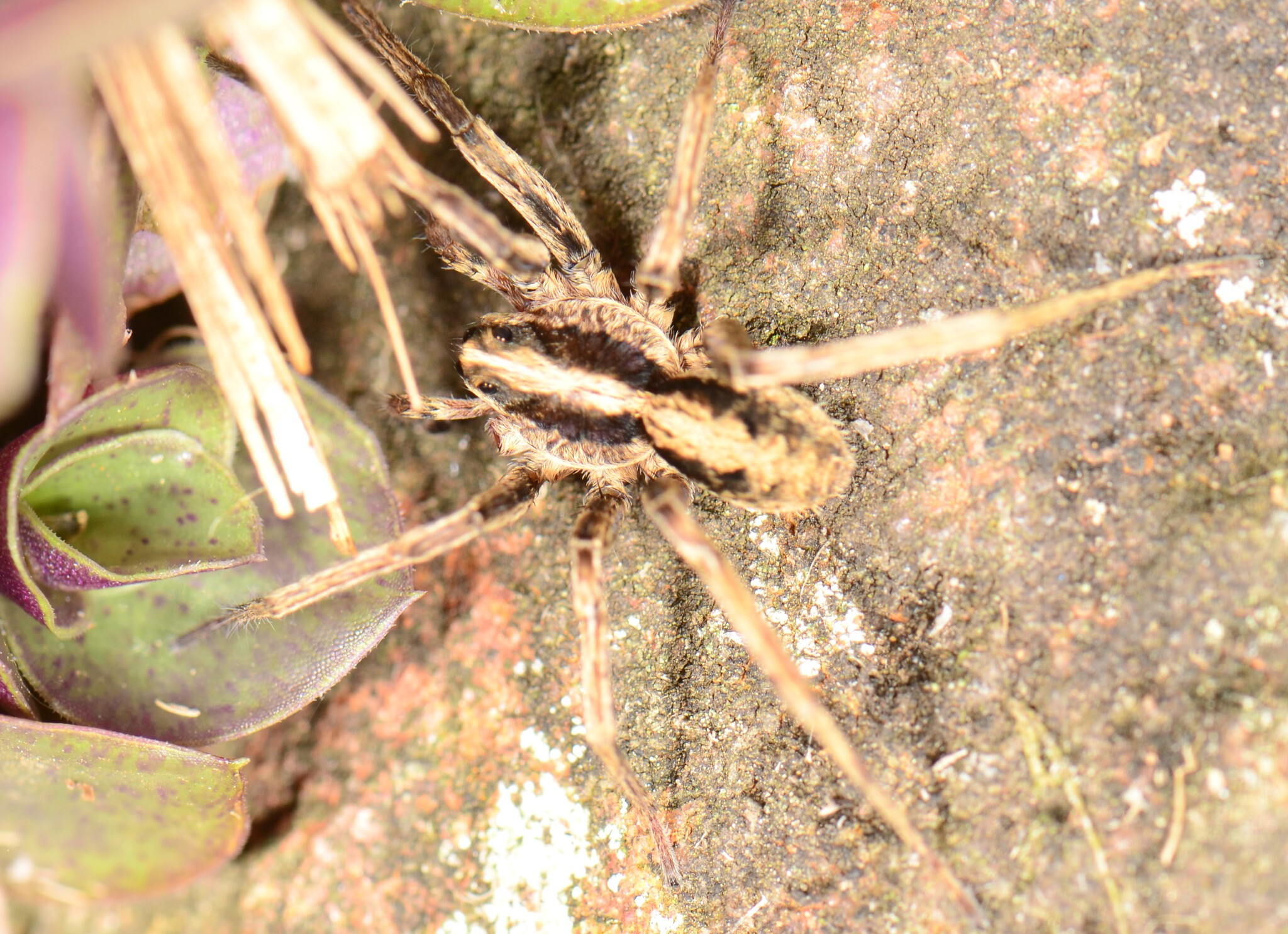
male C. pulchriventris

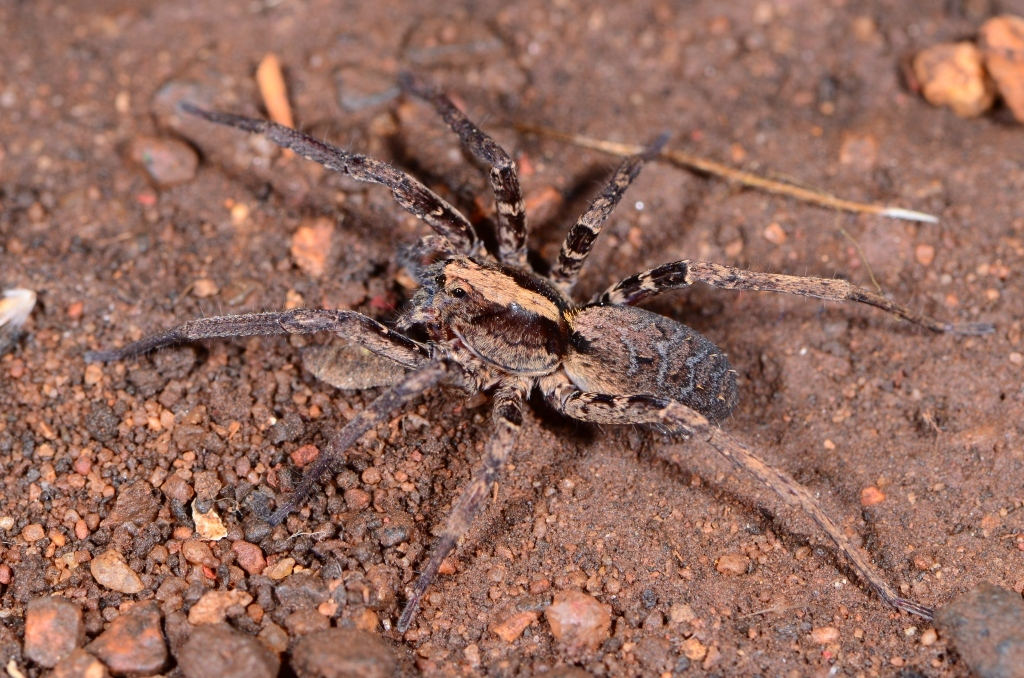
female C. transvaalensis

Complete list of species
- C. abditus Arts, 1912 – DR Congo, Tanzania
- C. adustus (Keyserling, 1877) – Colombia
- C. agroecoides (Thorell, 1881) – Australia (Queensland)
- C. albofasciatus F. O. Pickard-Cambridge, 1897 – Brazil
- C. alienus F. O. Pickard-Cambridge, 1900 – Guatemala
- C. amanensis Strand, 1907 – Kenya, Tanzania
- C. amphora Mello-Leitão, 1930 – Colombia, Brazil, Guyana
- C. anahitaeformis Benoit, 1981 – Burundi
- C. anahitiformis Strand, 1909 – Brazil
- C. auricomus Arts, 1912 – DR Congo, Rwanda
- C. avidus Bryant, 1948 – Haiti
- C. bahamensis Strand, 1907 – Bahamas
- C. bigibbosus Benoit, 1980 – DR Congo
- C. bilobatus F. O. Pickard-Cambridge, 1900 – Mexico
- C. blumenauensis Strand, 1909 – Brazil
- C. bolivicola Strand, 1907 – Bolivia
- C. bueanus Strand, 1916 – Cameroon
- C. calcaratus F. O. Pickard-Cambridge, 1900 – Guatemala
- C. calderitas Alayón, 2002 – Mexico
- C. caligineus Arts, 1912 – DR Congo, Burundi, South Africa
- C. captiosus Gertsch, 1935 – United States
- C. capulinus (Karsch, 1879) – Cameroon, Equatorial Guinea, Gabon, DR Congo
- C. catherine Polotow & Brescovit, 2012 – Jamaica
- C. cavaticus Arts, 1912 – DR Congo, Angola
- C. celisi Benoit, 1981 – DR Congo
- C. coccineipes Pocock, 1903 – Cameroon, DR Congo, Rwanda, Burundi
- C. colombianus Mello-Leitão, 1941 – Colombia
- C. colonicus Arts, 1912 – Kenya, Tanzania
- C. complicatus Franganillo, 1946 – Cuba
- C. constrictus Benoit, 1981 – DR Congo
- C. convexus F. O. Pickard-Cambridge, 1900 – Mexico to Costa Rica
- C. cruciatus Franganillo, 1930 – Cuba
- C. crulsi Mello-Leitão, 1930 – Brazil
- C. darlingtoni Bryant, 1948 – Haiti
- C. datus Strand, 1909 – Ecuador
- C. decemnotatus Simon, 1909 – Guinea-Bissau
- C. decorus (Gerstaecker, 1873) – Kenya
- C. delesserti (Caporiacco, 1947) – Guyana
- C. denticulatus Benoit, 1981 – DR Congo
- C. dilucidus Simon, 1909 – Gabon
- C. doloensis Caporiacco, 1940 – Ethiopia
- C. drassoides (Karsch, 1879) – Colombia
- C. dreyeri Strand, 1906 – Cameroon
- C. dubius Walckenaer, 1805 – French Guiana (type species)
- C. efferatus Arts, 1912 – DR Congo
- C. elgonensis Benoit, 1978 – Kenya
- C. ellacomei F. O. Pickard-Cambridge, 1902 – Suriname
- C. embolus Benoit, 1981 – DR Congo
- C. ensiger F. O. Pickard-Cambridge, 1900 – Mexico
- C. esculentus Arts, 1912 – Cameroon, DR Congo
- C. excavatus F. O. Pickard-Cambridge, 1900 – Mexico
- C. exlineae Peck, 1981 – United States
- C. facetus Arts, 1912 – DR Congo
- C. falcatus F. O. Pickard-Cambridge, 1902 – St. Lucia
- C. falciformis Benoit, 1981 – DR Congo
- C. falconensis Schenkel, 1953 – Venezuela
- C. fasciatus Mello-Leitão, 1943 – Brazil
- C. fernandae Brescovit & Simó, 2007 – Brazil
- C. feshius Benoit, 1979 – DR Congo
- C. guantanamo (Alayón, 2001) – Cuba
- C. gulosus Arts, 1912 – South Africa
- C. haina Alayón, 2004 – Dominican Rep.
- C. haitiensis Strand, 1909 – Haiti
- C. hiemalis Bryant, 1948 – Haiti
- C. holmi Benoit, 1978 – Kenya
- C. humilis (Keyserling, 1887) – Nicaragua
- C. hybernalis Hentz, 1844 – United States
- C. hygrophilus Benoit, 1977 – DR Congo
- C. idjwiensis Benoit, 1979 – DR Congo
- C. igatu Polotow, Cizauskas & Brescovit, 2022 – Brazil
- C. inaja Höfer, Brescovit & Gasnier, 1994 – Colombia, Peru, Bolivia, Brazil
- C. insulanus Bryant, 1948 – Dominican Rep.
- C. jaminauensis Mello-Leitão, 1936 – Brazil
- C. jaragua Alayón, 2004 – Dominican Rep.
- C. kenyamontanus Benoit, 1978 – Kenya
- C. kipatimus Benoit, 1981 – Tanzania
- C. lacertus Benoit, 1979 – DR Congo
- C. latitabundus Arts, 1912 – Cameroon, DR Congo
- C. lejeunei Benoit, 1977 – DR Congo
- C. leonardi Simon, 1909 – Guinea-Bissau, Ghana, Cameroon
- C. levipes Arts, 1912 – Tanzania
- C. longicalcar Kraus, 1955 – El Salvador
- C. lubwensis Benoit, 1979 – DR Congo
- C. macellarius Simon, 1909 – Gabon
- C. maculatus Franganillo, 1931 – Cuba
- C. maculisternis Strand, 1909 – Bolivia, Brazil
- C. magnificus Arts, 1912 – Guinea-Bissau, Ivory Coast, Togo, Nigeria, Cameroon, DR Congo
- C. malvernensis Petrunkevitch, 1910 – Jamaica
- C. manauara Höfer, Brescovit & Gasnier, 1994 – Brazil
- C. manni Bryant, 1948 – Haiti
- C. medius Keyserling, 1891 – Panama, Brazil
- C. minimus F. O. Pickard-Cambridge, 1897 – North America
- C. minor F. O. Pickard-Cambridge, 1897 – Brazil
- C. mitchelli Gertsch, 1971 – Mexico
- C. modestus Simon, 1897 – Tanzania (Zanzibar), Kenya
- C. monticola Bryant, 1948 – Haiti
- C. musosanus Benoit, 1979 – DR Congo
- C. naranjo Alayón, 2004 – Dominican Rep.
- C. nigritarsis (Pavesi, 1897) – Ethiopia
- C. nigritus F. O. Pickard-Cambridge, 1897 – Brazil
- C. nigrolineatus Berland, 1913 – Panama, Ecuador
- C. nigromaculatus Thorell, 1899 – Togo, Cameroon, Gabon, DR Congo, South Sudan, Rwanda, Burundi
- C. noctuabundus Arts, 1912 – Kenya
- C. obscurus (Keyserling, 1877) – Colombia
- C. oligochronius Arts, 1912 – Tanzania
- C. ornatus (Keyserling, 1877) – Brazil
- C. ottleyi (Petrunkevitch, 1930) – Puerto Rico
- C. paranus Strand, 1909 – Brazil
- C. parvoculatus Benoit, 1979 – South Africa
- C. parvus (Keyserling, 1877) – Colombia
- C. paubrasil Brescovit & Simó, 2007 – Brazil
- C. pauloterrai Brescovit & Simó, 2007 – Brazil
- C. peregrinus F. O. Pickard-Cambridge, 1900 – Guatemala, Costa Rica
- C. pilosus Franganillo, 1930 – Cuba
- C. pogonias Thorell, 1899 – Cameroon
- C. potteri Simon, 1901 – Eritrea, Ethiopia, Equatorial Guinea (Bioko)
- C. pulchriventris (Simon, 1897) – Zimbabwe, South Africa
- C. racenisi Caporiacco, 1955 – Venezuela
- C. ramosi Alayón, 2002 – Cuba
- C. ravidus (Simon, 1886) – Argentina
- C. rectipes F. O. Pickard-Cambridge, 1897 – Brazil, Guyana
- C. renivulvatus Strand, 1906 – Ghana
- C. rivulatus Pocock, 1900 – Cameroon, Gabon
- C. rubripes Keyserling, 1881 – Panama, Ecuador
- C. rwandanus Benoit, 1981 – Rwanda
- C. saltensis Strand, 1909 – Argentina, Bolivia
- C. satanas Strand, 1909 – Ecuador
- C. serratipes F. O. Pickard-Cambridge, 1897 – Venezuela, Guyana, Brazil
- C. serrichelis Mello-Leitão, 1922 – Brazil
- C. sexmaculatus Roewer, 1961 – Senegal
- C. siankaan Alayón, 2002 – Mexico
- C. sigma (Schenkel, 1953) – Venezuela
- C. silvaticus Benoit, 1981 – DR Congo
- C. similis F. O. Pickard-Cambridge, 1897 – Brazil
- C. somaliensis Benoit, 1979 – Somalia
- C. spectabilis Lessert, 1921 – DR Congo, Uganda, Tanzania, South Africa
- C. spiculus F. O. Pickard-Cambridge, 1897 – Colombia
- C. spiralis F. O. Pickard-Cambridge, 1900 – Costa Rica
- C. supinus F. O. Pickard-Cambridge, 1900 – Costa Rica
- C. tenuipes Denis, 1955 – Guinea
- C. torvus Pavesi, 1883 – Ethiopia
- C. transvaalensis Benoit, 1981 – South Africa
- C. trinidensis (Alayón, 2001) – Trinidad
- C. uluguruensis Benoit, 1979 – Tanzania
- C. undulatus Steyn & Van der Donckt, 2003 – Ivory Coast
- C. unilineatus Simon, 1898 – St. Vincent
- C. vagus Blackwall, 1866 – south-east equatorial Africa
- C. validus Denis, 1955 – Guinea
- C. valverdiensis Peck, 1981 – United States
- C. vatovae Caporiacco, 1940 – Ethiopia
- C. vehemens Keyserling, 1891 – Brazil
- C. vespertilio Mello-Leitão, 1941 – Colombia
- C. villasboasi Mello-Leitão, 1949 – Colombia, Ecuador, Brazil
- C. vividus Blackwall, 1865 – East of central Africa
- C. w-notatus Petrunkevitch, 1925 – Panama
